= Fairy (disambiguation) =

A fairy is a type of mythical being or legendary creature in European folklore.

fairy (faery, faerie or faërie) may also refer to:

== Tradition and mythology ==
- Fairyland
- The Faerie faith, a neopagan tradition
- The Fairy Flag, a Scottish heirloom
- Feri Tradition, a neopagan tradition
- Diwata, fairies and minor gods in Philippine mythology
- Xian, fairies and immortals in Buddhism and Taoism in East Asian culture
- Tooth fairy, Western-influenced childhood folkloric figure

== Animals and plants ==
- Calypso (plant) or fairy slipper, a species of orchid
- Fairy hummingbirds, in the genus Heliothryx
- Fairy tern, a bird
- Fairyfly, a wasp
- Little penguin, formerly known as "fairy penguin"

== Arts, entertainment, and media ==
=== Fictional entities ===
- Faerie (DC Comics), comic book fictional place
- The Shobijin, the little sisters, or the name of the moth they ride in Mothra

=== Music ===
- The Fairies, translation of Die Feen, opera by Richard Wagner
- The Fairies (British band), a 1960s British R&B band
- Fairies (Japanese group), a Japanese girl group
  - Fairies (album), 2014

=== Other uses in entertainment ===
- Faeries (1999 film), a 1999 animated film
- Faeries (1981 film), a 1981 animated special
- Faeries (anthology), an anthology of fantasy and science fiction short stories
- Fairy chess piece, an unorthodox piece in a chess variant
- The Fairies (TV series), an Australian live-action children's television series
- Faeries (book), by Brian Froud and Alan Lee
- Faeries (Ars Magica), a supplement for the role-playing game Ars Magica

== Homosexual context ==
- Fairy (gay slang), a slang term for gay men
- Radical Faeries, an organization composed mostly of gay men

== Other uses ==
- Fairy (brand), a detergent brand owned by Procter and Gamble
- Fairy (steamboat), a small wooden sidewheel-driven steamship
- Fairy, Texas, an unincorporated community in Hamilton County, Texas
- Fairy, codename of Special Operations Executive Agent Yvonne Cormeau (1909–1997)

== See also ==
- Fairey (disambiguation)
- Fairy tale (disambiguation)
- Fairyland (disambiguation)
- Ferry (disambiguation)
- Fay (disambiguation)
- Fey (disambiguation)
- List of beings referred to as fairies
