= Faye (given name) =

Faye is a given name in various cultures. In the West, the given name is usually feminine. Faye is derived from Middle English "faie", meaning "fairy", or possibly from the Old French word meaning loyalty or belief.

== Women with the name ==
- Faye Glenn Abdellah (1919–2017), American pioneer in nursing research, first woman Deputy Surgeon General and rear admiral
- Faye Adams, stage name of American R&B singer Fanny Tuell (1923–2016)
- Faye Brookes (born 1987), English actress
- Faye Blackstone (1915–2011), American rodeo star
- Faye Copeland (1921–2003), American convicted multiple murderer
- Faye Dancer (1925–2002), American baseball player
- Faye Daveney (born 1993), British actress
- Faye D'Souza, Indian TV anchor
- Faye Dunaway (born 1941), American actress
- Faye Emerson (1917–1983), American actress
- Faye Grant (born 1957), American actress
- Faye Hirsch (born 1956), American writer, art critic, editor, and educator
- Faye Kellerman (born 1952), American writer of mystery novels
- Faye Marsay (born 1986), English actress
- Faye Resnick (born 1959), American actress
- Faye S. Taxman (born 1955), American scholar
- Faye Tozer (born 1975), British singer who found fame in UK pop band Steps
- Faye Urban (1945–2020), Canadian tennis player
- Faye Wattleton (born 1943), American activist for women's rights
- Faye Webster (born 1997), American indie folk musician, singer, and photographer
- Faye Wei Wei (born 1994), English painter
- Faye White (born 1978), English former footballer
- Faye Winter (born 1995), English television personality
- Faye Wong (born 1969), Chinese singer, songwriter and actress
- Faye Yager (1948–2024), American community activist

== Men with the name ==
- Faye Abbott (1895–1965), American football player
- Faye Balla (born 1994), Senegalese footballer
- Gary Gilmore (born Faye Robert Coffman; 1940–1977), American murderer
- Faye Njie (born 1993), Finnish-born Gambian judoka
- Faye Throneberry (1931–1999), American professional baseball player

== Fictional characters ==
- Faye Chamberlain in the TV series The Secret Circle (TV series)
- Faye Dolan in the film That Thing You Do!
- Faye Lamb in the British soap opera Emmerdale
- Dr. Faye Miller in the TV show Mad Men
- Faye Morton in the British TV series Holby City
- Faye Moskowitz, Frasier Crane's recurring love interest in Frasier season 6
- Faye Valentine in the anime Cowboy Bebop
- Faye Yeager in the anime Attack on Titan
- Faye Whitaker in the webcomic Questionable Content
- Faye Windass (née Butler) in the UK TV series Coronation Street
- Faye in the video game Fire Emblem Echoes: Shadows of Valentia, and mobile game Fire Emblem Heroes
- Faye in Freebird Games' video game "Finding Paradise"
- Faye, a character in video game franchise God of War
- Faye Lau, a character in video games Tom Clancy's The Division and Tom Clancy's The Division 2
- Faye, the protagonist in Rachel Cusk's Outline novels

== See also ==
- Fay (given name)
- Faye (surname)
- Faye (disambiguation)
