= Fay (disambiguation) =

A fay is a fairy.

Fay or FAY may also refer to:

== People ==
- Fay (given name)
- Fay (surname)

== Places ==
France

- Fay, Orne
- Fay, Sarthe
- Fay, Somme

Iran

- Alavoneh-ye Fay, or Fāy, a village in Khuzestan Province

United States

- Fay, Missouri
- Fay, Oklahoma

== Storms ==
- Hurricane Fay, 2014
- Tropical Storm Fay (2002), 2002 tropical cyclone
- Tropical Storm Fay (2008), 2008 tropical cyclone
- Tropical Storm Fay (2020), 2020 tropical cyclone

== Other uses ==
- Fay (TV series), television series broadcast from 1975–76
- Fayetteville Regional Airport, serving Fayetteville, North Carolina, United States
- Fayetteville station, Amtrak code FAY
- Fay, Islamic property right mentioned in Surah 4:6 of the Qur'an
- Fay School, an independent, coeducational junior-prep school located in Southborough, Massachusetts, United States
- the Hebrew letter fe
- Fay is a novel by Larry Brown published in 2000

== See also ==
- Fays (disambiguation)
- Faye (disambiguation)
- Fey (disambiguation)
- Fairy (disambiguation)
- Justice Fay (disambiguation)
