= Feys =

Feys is a surname. Notable people with the surname include:

- Debbrich Feys (born 1984), Belgian tennis player
- Matthias Feys (born 1985), Belgian footballer
- Robert Feys (1889–1961), Belgian logician and philosopher
- Wim Feys (born 1971), Belgian cyclist

== See also ==
- Fays (disambiguation)
- Fey (disambiguation)
