= Fay (given name) =

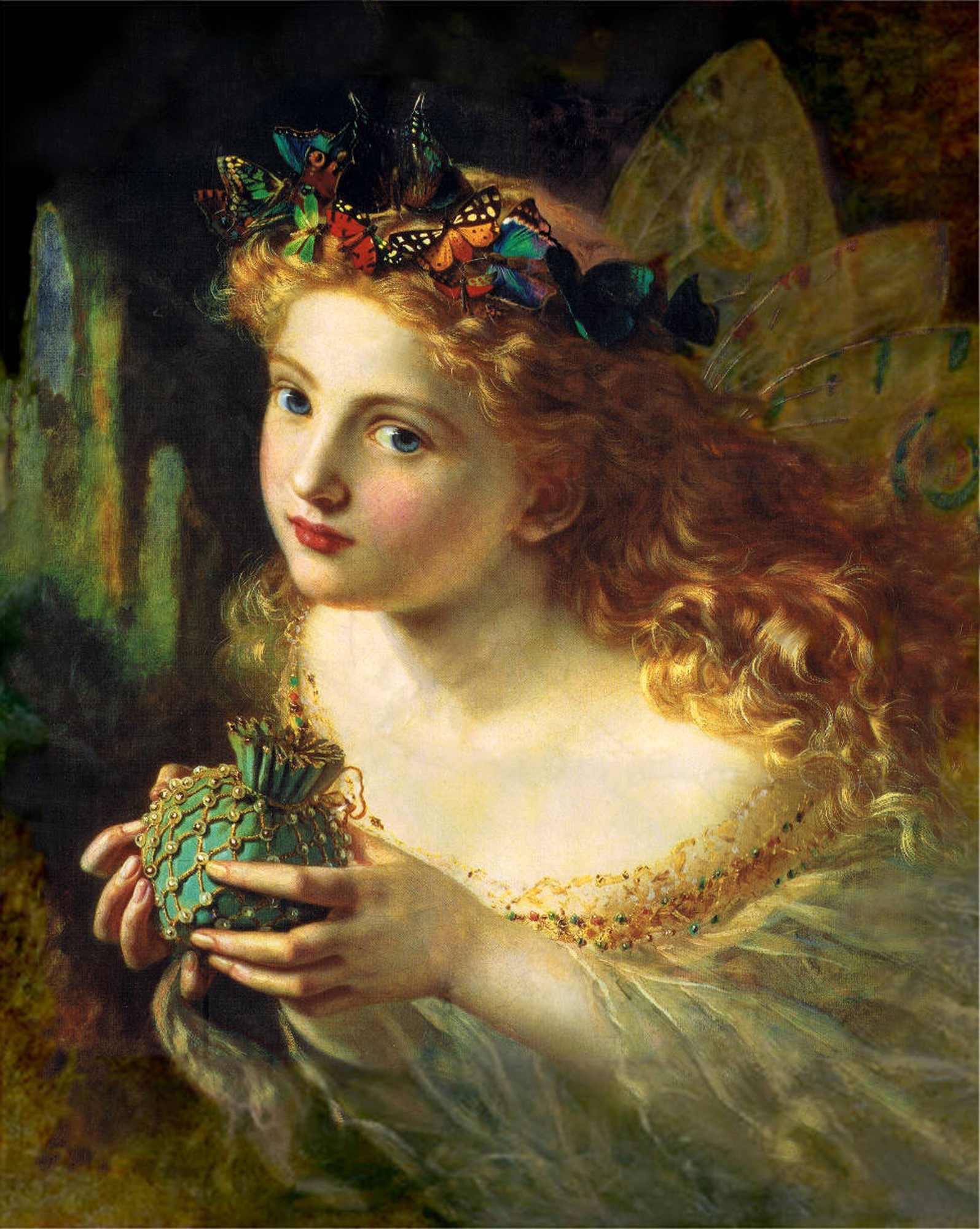
- Take the Fair Face of Woman, and Gently Suspending, With Butterflies, Flowers, and Jewels Attending, Thus Your Fairy is Made of Most Beautiful Things by Sophie Gengembre Anderson. The name Fay can mean fairy, as depicted in the painting.
- Pronunciation: /ˈfeɪ/
- Gender: Unisex
- Language: English

Origin
- Origin: English
- Meaning: fairy or short form of Faith
- Region of origin: England

Other names
- Variant forms: Faye; Fae
- Related names: Faith, Fayette, Lafayette

Fay is a unisex English given name meaning fairy. Alternately, it is a diminutive of Faith. It has been in use in English-speaking countries since the 1800s.

It may refer to:

== Women with the name ==
- Fay Babcock (1895–1970), American film set director
- Fay Bainter (1893–1968), American actress
- Fay Baker (1917–1987), American actress
- Fay Chung (born 1941), Zimbabwean educator
- Fay Compton (1894–1978), English actress
- Fay Crocker (1914–1983), Uruguayan golfer
- Fay Davis (1873–1945), American actress
- Fay Dowker (21st century), British theoretical physicist
- Fay Farnum (1888–1977), American mathematician
- Fay Gale (1932–2008), Australian cultural geographer
- Fay Godwin (1931–2005), British photographer
- Fay Holden (1893–1973), American actress
- Fay Holderness (1881–1963), American actor
- Fay Jones (born 1985), British politician
- Fay Kanin (1917–2013), American screenwriter
- Fay Kelton (21st century), Australian actress
- Fay King, Multiple people
- Fay Kleinman (1912–2012), American painter
- Fay Lanphier (1905–1959), American model
- Fay Lemport (20th century), American actress
- Fay Masterson (born 1974), English actress
- Fay McAlpine (born 1960), New Zealand designer, typographer and academic at Massey University
- Fay McKay (1930–2008), American entertainer
- Fay McKenzie (1918–2019), American actor
- Fay Peck (1931–2016) was an American Expressionist artist.
- Fay Bellamy Powell (1938–2013), American civil rights activist
- Fay Presto (born 1948), British magician
- Fay Ripley (born 1966), English actress
- Fay Rusling (21st century), British comedy writer
- Fay Spain (1932–1983), American actress
- Fay Taylour (1904–1983), Irish motorcycle racer
- Fay Templeton (1865–1939), American actress
- Fay Tincher (1884–1983), American actress
- Fay Webb-Gardner (1885–1969), American political hostess
- Fay Weldon (1931–2023), English author
- Fay Gillis Wells (1908–2002), American aviator
- Fay Wray (1907–2004), American actress
- Fay Zwicky (1933–2017), Australian poet

== Men with the name ==
- Fay Alexander (1924–2000), American stunt man and circus acrobat
- Fay B. Begor (1916–1943), American physician
- Fay Boozman (1946–2005), American ophthalmologist and politician
- Fay W. Brabson (1880–1970), U.S. Army officer and historian
- Fay G. Child (1908–1965), American politician and newspaper editor
- Fay Chong (1912–1973), Chinese-American artist and educator
- Fay Marvin Clark (1907–1991), American real-estate developer, entrepreneur and politician
- Fay-Cooper Cole (1881–1961), American professor of anthropology
- Fay Coyle (1933–2007), Northern Irish footballer
- Fay Cravens (1872–1955), American politician and newspaper editor
- Fay Devlin (21st century), Irish footballer
- Fayette Fay Oliver Farwell (1858–1935), American inventor
- Fay Harper (1866–1950), English footballer
- Fay Hempstead (1847–1934), American lawyer, author, and poet
- Fay Jackson (1888–1959), Canadian politician
- Fay King, Multiple people
- Fay Moulton (1876–1945), American sprinter
- Fay Na (19th century), King of Champasak
- Fay Allen Des Portes (1890–1944), American ambassador
- Fay B. Prickett (1893–1982), U.S. Army major general
- Fay Roope (1893–1961), American actor
- Fay Thomas (1903–1990), American baseball player
- Fay Vincent (born 1938), American film studio executive
- Lafayette Fay Washington (1915–1975), American baseball player
- Fay Wood (disambiguation), multiple people
  - Fay Wood (American football), American football player and coach
  - Fay Wood (politician) (1889–1959), American politician from Nebraska
- Fay Young (1884–1957), American journalist

== Fictional characters ==
- Fay Marvin, a character in the 1991 American comedy movie What About Bob?

== See also ==
- Fay (surname)
- Faye (given name)
- Fay-Ann
- Fay-Cooper
