= Fairy tale (disambiguation) =

A fairy tale is a story featuring folkloric characters.

Fairy Tale(s), Faerie Tale(s), Faery Tale(s), or Fairytale(s) may also refer to:

== Films ==
- Fairytale (film), a 2022 experimental film
- Fairy Tales (film), a 1978 sex comedy
- FairyTale: A True Story, a 1997 film based on the story of the Cottingley Fairies

== Games ==
- Fairy Tale (game), a card game
- A Fairy Tale (video game), a 2009 puzzle video game created by Reflexive Entertainment
- The Faery Tale Adventure, a 1987 adventure video game

== Literature ==
- Faerie Tale, a 1988 fantasy novel by Raymond E. Feist
- Fairy Tales (Cummings book), a book of fairy tales by e.e. cummings
- Fairy Tales (Jones book), a book of children's stories by Terry Jones
- Fairy Tale (novel), a 2022 novel by Stephen King
- Fairytale fantasy, a subgenre of fantasy that uses of folklore motifs and plots
- Several collections of fairy tales with distinguished illustrations by John Dickson Batten, published by Joseph Jacobs

== Music ==
- Fairy Tale (Suk), an orchestral suite by Josef Suk

=== Albums ===
- Fairy Tale (Mai Kuraki album), or the title song
- Fairy Tale (Michael Wong album), or the title song
- Fairy Tales (Divine album), 1998
- Fairy Tales (Mother Gong album), 1979
- Fairy Tales, a 2014 album by Futurecop!
- Fairytale (album), a 1965 album by Donovan
- Fairytales (Alexander Rybak album), or the title song (see below)
- Fairytales (Desirée Sparre-Enger album), or the title song

=== Songs ===
- "Fairytale" (Kalafina song)
- "Fairytale" (Pointer Sisters song), 1974
- "Fairytale" (Alexander Rybak song), the winning entry of the Eurovision Song Contest 2009
- "Fairytale" (Eneda Tarifa song), the Albanian entry for the Eurovision Song Contest 2016
- "Fairytales" (2 Brothers on the 4th Floor song), 1996
- "Fairytale", by Dana
- "Fairytale", by Edguy from Vain Glory Opera
- "Fairytale", by Enya from Enya
- "Fairytale", by Heavenly from Coming from the Sky
- "Fairytale", by Justin Bieber featuring Jaden Smith from Believe
- "Fairytale", by Sonata Arctica from The Ninth Hour
- "Fairytale", by Sara Bareilles from Careful Confessions and Little Voice
- "Fairytales" by Alice Deejay from Who Needs Guitars Anyway?
- "Fairytales", by Robbie Williams featuring Rod Stewart from The Christmas Present
- "Fairytales", by Serenity from Fallen Sanctuary
- "Fairy Tale", by Galneryus from Reincarnation
- "Fairy Tale", by Loona 1/3 from Love & Live
- "Fairy Tale", by Shaman from Ritual
- "Fairy Tales", by Anita Baker from Compositions

== Television ==
- Fairy Tale (Canadian TV series), a Canadian LGBT dating show
- Fairy Tale (Pakistani TV series), a 2023 Pakistani television series
- Fairy Tales (TV series), a 2008 British drama anthology series
- "Fairy Tale", the 12th episode in season 2 of the Disney Channel sitcom Wizards of Waverly Place
- "Fairytale" (The Crown), an episode of The Crown
- JJ Villard's Fairy Tales, an adult animated television series

== Other uses ==
- A Fairy Tale (ballet), a ballet by Marius Petipa and Richter
- Fairy Tale (color), a shade of pink

== See also ==
- Fairy godmother (disambiguation)
- Fairy Tail, a 2006 manga by Hiro Mashima
- Tooth Fairy (disambiguation)
