= Faye =

Faye may refer to:

== Places ==
- Faye, Loir-et-Cher, France, a village
- Faye-d'Anjou, France, a village
- La Faye, France, a village
- Faye, Kentucky, an unincorporated community in Elliott County, Kentucky, United States
- Faye (crater), a lunar impact crater in the southern highlands of the Moon

== People and fictional characters ==
- Faye (given name), including a list of people and fictional characters
- Faye (surname), including a list of people
- Faye (musician), stage name of Swedish singer, songwriter, and model Fanny Matilda Dagmar Hamlin (born 1987)
- Faye (Taiwanese singer), member of the Taiwanese band F.I.R.

== Other uses ==
- Faye (film), a 2024 American documentary film
- Hurricane Faye (1975)
- 4P/Faye, a periodic comet discovered in 1843 by Hervé Faye

== See also ==
- Fay (disambiguation)
- Fey (disambiguation)
