= Bobridge =

Bobridge is a surname. Notable people with the surname include:

- Jack Bobridge (born 1989), Australian cyclist
- Rhys Bobridge (born 1981), Australian singer, dancer, and make-up artist
