= Fiey =

Fiey is a surname most commonly found in Belgium. Notable people with the surname include:

- Fabien Fiey (born 1994), or KioShiMa, French Counter-Strike player
- Jean Maurice Fiey (1914–1995), French Dominican Father and prominent Church historian and Syriacist

== See also ==
- Fey (name)
