= Princeton, Minnesota =

City in Minnesota, United States

- City
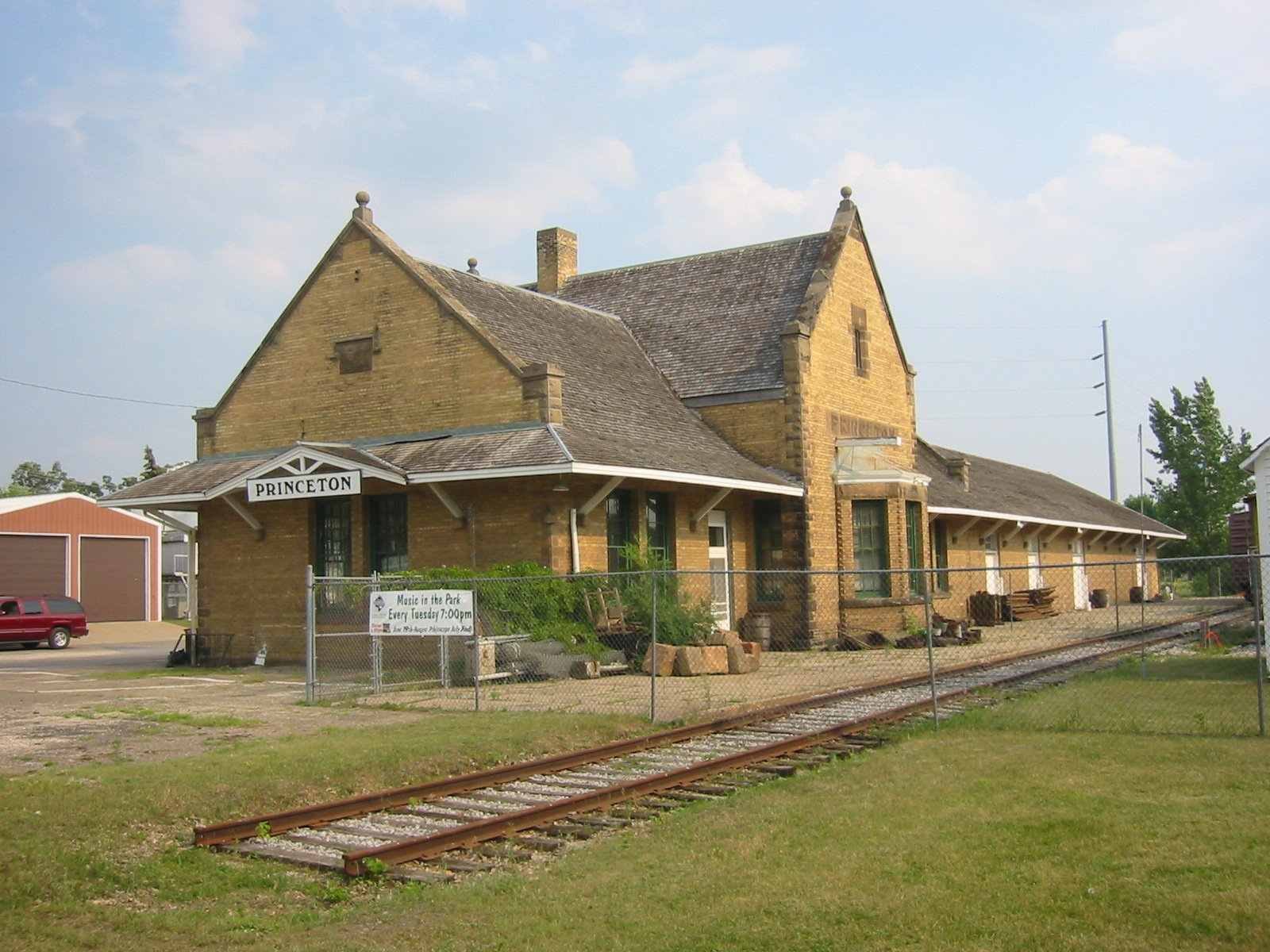
- The Great Northern Depot served Princeton on the Great Northern Railway until 1976.
- Motto: "A Growing Community on the Rum River"
- Location within Mille Lacs County in the state of Minnesota
- Coordinates: 45°34′06″N 93°35′24″W
- Country: United States
- State: Minnesota
- Counties: Mille Lacs, Sherburne
- Incorporated: March 3, 1877

Government
  - Mayor: Thom Walker

Area
  - Total: 5.15 sq mi (13.3 km^{2})
  - Land: 4.93 sq mi (12.8 km^{2})
  - Water: 0.22 sq mi (0.57 km^{2})
- Elevation: 981 ft (299 m)

Population (2020)
  - Total: 4,819
  - Estimate (2022): 5,311
  - Density: 1,076.8/sq mi (415.8/km^{2})
- Time zone: UTC-6 (Central)
  - Summer (DST): UTC-5 (CDT)
- ZIP code: 55371
- Area code: 763
- FIPS code: 27-52522
- GNIS feature ID: 2396279
- Website: www.princetonmn.org

Princeton is a city in Mille Lacs and Sherburne counties in the U.S. state of Minnesota, at the junction of the Rum River and its West Branch. It is 50 miles (80 km) north of Minneapolis and 30 miles (48 km) east of St. Cloud, at the intersection of Highways 169 and 95. The population was 4,819 at the 2020 census and an estimated 5,311 in 2022. A majority of its residents live in Mille Lacs County.

== History ==
In the winter of 1855 Samuel Ross, Jame W. Gillian, Dorilus Morrison, John S. Prince and Richard Chute platted the town of Princeton. The plat was officially recorded on April 19, 1856.

=== Lumbering ===
Princeton's location near the junction of the Rum River and its West Branch was critical to the town's development. In 1847, Daniel Stanchfield led an expedition to explore the Rum River. The group discovered vast white pine forests upstream from Princeton's future site along the Rum River, the West Branch Rum River, and their tributaries. Three sawmills were built in Princeton between 1856 and 1867. Lumbermen floated logs down the Rum River to the Princeton mills, though most of the logs passed through Princeton to mills in Minneapolis.

=== Brickmaking ===
Brick-making was another important industry in the Princeton area. The industry developed about two miles northeast of Princeton near beds of clay. A community known as Brickton formed in the location. From 1889 through the late 1920s several brickyards operated in Brickton, collectively producing as many as 20 million bricks per year. When the brick industry declined, Brickton ceased to exist. "Years after the last brick had been shipped from Brickton, specifications in contracts for construction of public buildings often stated that it should be of Princeton brick or of equally good quality."

=== Other ===
Other important industries in Princeton's early years included wheat farming (before potatoes became primary), potato farming, starch production, dairy, and distilled spirits production, in which the town's distillery continues to play a key role.

== Geography ==
Princeton is at the southern end of Mille Lacs County and extends south into the northeast corner of Sherburne County. The city center is about three-quarters of a mile north of the county border. U.S. Highway 169 passes through the west side of the city on a four-lane bypass, leading north 14 miles (23 km) to Milaca, the Mille Lacs county seat, and south 19 miles (31 km) to Elk River, the Sherburne county seat. State Highway 95 passes through the north side of the city, leading east 18 miles (29 km) to Cambridge and west to St. Cloud.

According to the U.S. Census Bureau, Princeton has a total area of 5.15 square miles (13.34 km^{2}); 4.93 square miles (12.77 km^{2}) are land and 0.22 square miles (0.57 km^{2}), or 4.31%, are water. The Rum River and its West Branch join in the northeast part of the city. The Rum River continues south along the east side of the city and ultimately joins the Mississippi River at Anoka.

== Demographics ==
Historical population
Census	Pop.	Note	%±
1880	587		—
1890	816		39.0%
1900	1,319		61.6%
1910	1,555		17.9%
1920	1,685		8.4%
1930	1,636		−2.9%
1940	1,865		14.0%
1950	2,108		13.0%
1960	2,353		11.6%
1970	2,531		7.6%
1980	3,146		24.3%
1990	3,719		18.2%
2000	3,933		5.8%
2010	4,698		19.5%
2020	4,819		2.6%
2022 (est.)	5,311		10.2%
U.S. Decennial Census; 2020 Census

=== 2020 census ===
As of the 2020 census, Princeton had a population of 4,819. The median age was 40.1 years. 21.1% of residents were under the age of 18 and 23.3% of residents were 65 years of age or older. For every 100 females there were 91.0 males, and for every 100 females age 18 and over there were 86.9 males age 18 and over.

99.4% of residents lived in urban areas, while 0.6% lived in rural areas.

There were 2,104 households in Princeton, of which 27.0% had children under the age of 18 living in them. Of all households, 36.5% were married-couple households, 18.9% were households with a male householder and no spouse or partner present, and 35.1% were households with a female householder and no spouse or partner present. About 36.3% of all households were made up of individuals and 19.4% had someone living alone who was 65 years of age or older.

There were 2,190 housing units, of which 3.9% were vacant. The homeowner vacancy rate was 0.8% and the rental vacancy rate was 4.5%.

Racial composition as of the 2020 census
Race	Number	Percent
White	4,365	90.6%
Black or African American	28	0.6%
American Indian and Alaska Native	58	1.2%
Asian	21	0.4%
Native Hawaiian and Other Pacific Islander	0	0.0%
Some other race	49	1.0%
Two or more races	298	6.2%
Hispanic or Latino (of any race)	128	2.7%

=== 2010 census ===
As of the census of 2010, there were 4,698 people, 1,926 households, and 1,176 families living in the city. The population density was 947.2 inhabitants per square mile (365.7/km^{2}). There were 2,044 housing units at an average density of 412.1 per square mile (159.1/km^{2}). The racial makeup of the city was 96.5% White, 0.4% African American, 0.7% Native American, 0.3% Asian, 0.2% from other races, and 2.0% from two or more races. Hispanic or Latino of any race were 1.7% of the population.

There were 1,926 households, of which 31.7% had children under the age of 18 living with them, 41.1% were married couples living together, 14.6% had a female householder with no husband present, 5.3% had a male householder with no wife present, and 38.9% were non-families. 32.3% of all households were made up of individuals, and 16.2% had someone living alone who was 65 years of age or older. The average household size was 2.35 and the average family size was 2.92.

The median age in the city was 38.7 years. 24.5% of residents were under the age of 18; 8.5% were between the ages of 18 and 24; 24.9% were from 25 to 44; 22.7% were from 45 to 64; and 19.4% were 65 years of age or older. The gender makeup of the city was 46.7% male and 53.3% female.

=== 2000 census ===
As of the census of 2000, there were 3,933 people, 1,624 households, and 998 families living in the city. The population density was 887.7 inhabitants per square mile (342.7/km^{2}). There were 1,670 housing units at an average density of 376.9 per square mile (145.5/km^{2}). The racial makeup of the city was 98.27% White, 0.13% African American, 0.38% Native American, 0.28% Asian, 0.03% Pacific Islander, 0.36% from other races, and 0.56% from two or more races. Hispanic or Latino of any race were 0.89% of the population.

There were 1,624 households, out of which 31.2% had children under the age of 18 living with them, 43.8% were married couples living together, 13.6% had a female householder with no husband present, and 38.5% were non-families. 33.0% of all households were made up of individuals, and 17.2% had someone living alone who was 65 years of age or older. The average household size was 2.33 and the average family size was 2.95.

In the city, the population was spread out, with 25.4% under the age of 18, 9.3% from 18 to 24, 26.8% from 25 to 44, 19.2% from 45 to 64, and 19.4% who were 65 years of age or older. The median age was 37 years. For every 100 females, there were 83.3 males. For every 100 females age 18 and over, there were 79.5 males.

The median income for a household in the city was $35,216, and the median income for a family was $42,558. Males had a median income of $31,684 versus $22,009 for females. The per capita income for the city was $18,381. About 2.7% of families and 6.7% of the population were below the poverty line, including 5.7% of those under age 18 and 12.8% of those age 65 or over.

== Notable people ==
- Bob Backlund (born 1949), World Wrestling Federation champion wrestler
- Jared Berggren (born 1990), professional basketball player
- Fay Cravens (1872–1955), Minnesota state senator
- Charles R. Davis (1945–2004), Minnesota state senator
- Kurt Daudt (born 1973), Speaker of the Minnesota House of Representatives
- Robert C. Dunn (1855–1918), Minnesota State Auditor
- Robert G. Dunn (1923–2017), Minnesota state senator
- Rod Grams (1948–2013), U.S. Senator from Minnesota
- Clarence C. Mitchell (1897–1986), Minnesota state senator
- Kevin Odegard (born 1950), guitarist on Bob Dylan's Blood on the Tracks
- Robert J. Odegard (1920–2013), Minnesota state representative
- Jerome P. Peterson (1936–2018), Minnesota state representative
- Paul Sather (born 1971), college basketball coach

== "Coke Geysers" world record attempt ==
The Princeton High School Student Council organized a community effort to break the world record for simultaneously erupting coke geysers on May 27, 2011. The record of 2,854 bottles was set in October 2010 in the Philippines. Hundreds of students participated, with a goal of setting off a series of 3,000 geysers, a figure they exceeded with 3,051 total simultaneous eruptions. But Guinness World Records personnel did not officiate the event and never made the record official. Students say the idea grew from a plan for a graduation prank into a way to put their small town on the map. A video of the attempt was broadcast on Minnesota NBC News affiliate KARE 11 and edited by a YouTube user named Physics314Nerd.

== Infrastructure ==
=== Transportation ===
Princeton is served by the Princeton Municipal Airport.

==== Major highways ====
The following routes are located within the city of Princeton:

- U.S. Highway 169
- Minnesota State Highway 95
