= Robert J. Odegard =

American politician

Robert J. Odegard (December 22, 1920 – September 20, 2013) was an American businessman and politician.

== Life and career ==
Born in Princeton, Minnesota, Odegard served in the United States Navy during World War II. He received his bachelor's degree in agricultural economics from University of Minnesota and later managed his family's business. He also served as the executive director of the University of Minnesota Foundation. Odegard served in the Minnesota House of Representatives in 1961 and 1962 as a Republican. He ran for the United States House of Representatives in 1962 and 1964 and lost the elections. He died Naples, Florida.
