= Fairey =

Fairey may refer to:

== People ==
- Charles Richard Fairey, British aircraft manufacturer
- David Fairey, English cricketer
- Francis Fairey (1887 - 1971), Canadian politician
- Jim Fairey, baseball player
- Mike Fairey, British businessman
- Shepard Fairey, American artist, designed the Barack Obama "Hope" poster

== Companies ==
- Fairey Aviation Company, British aircraft company
  - Avions Fairey, the Belgian-based subsidiary of the British Fairey Aviation Company
- Fairey Marine Ltd, a shipbuilding company based on the River Hamble, Southampton, England

== Aircraft ==
Many "Fairey" aircraft were made by the Fairey Aviation Company — see Aircraft

== Other ==
- Fairey Fireflash was the first British air-to-air missile
- Fairey Band is a brass band based in Heaton Chapel in Stockport, Greater Manchester
