= Victor Dandré =

Russian aristocrat (1870–1944)

Victor Emilyevich Dandré or D'André (Russian: Виктор Эмильевич Дандре; 1870 – 5 February 1944) was a Russian aristocrat and official who was a member of the Saint Petersburg City Duma. He left Russia and became the husband of the ballerina, Anna Pavlova, and a ballet impresario.

== Life ==
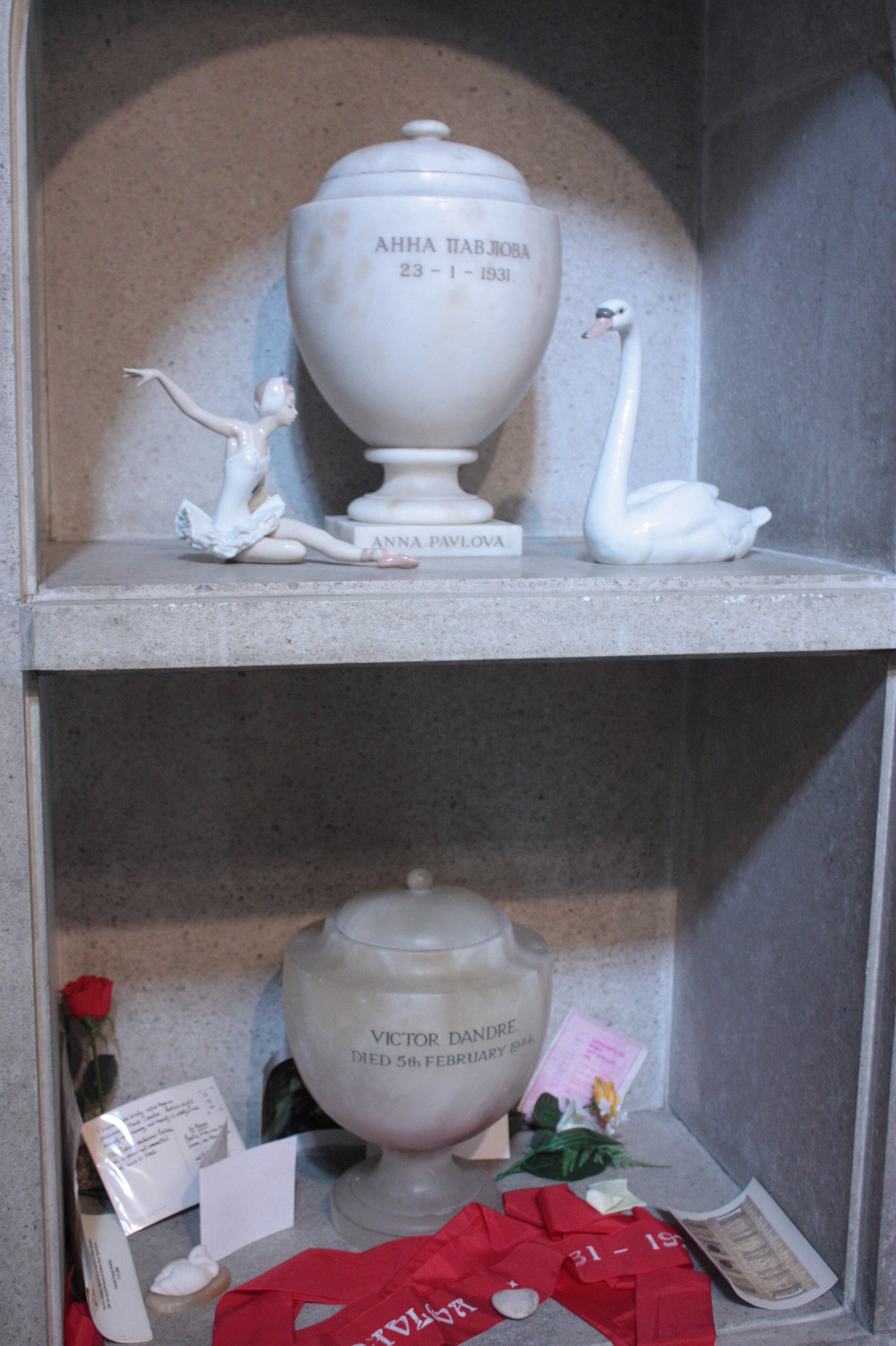
The ashes of Victor Dandre below the ashes of Anna Pavlova, Golders Green Columbarium

Victor Emmanuel Dandré was born in Saint Petersburg, Russia, in 1870. He was descended from the French aristocratic Dandré family, who had settled in Russia after the French revolution along with other French families. He was regarded as a French–Russian aristocrat, who had spent his early life mainly in Paris and Saint Petersburg. He was well educated and spoke four languages fluently. Before meeting Pavlova, he was a member of the Saint Petersburg City Duma and a speaker and whip in the Governing Senate.

He met Anna Pavlova in Paris in 1904 (some sources say 1900) and very soon became her manager. They married secretly in 1914. Their main residence from around 1912 was Ivy House in Golders Green, since 1830s a predominantly Jewish area of London. The residence later became famed for the ornamental lake with swans which symbolized Pavlova's most famous role in The Dying Swan. They ran a dance school from the house. Under his management, Pavlova's ballet troupe grew from six to sixty. Dandré's financial affairs, which included charges of fraud, prevented the couple from returning to Russia.

Following Pavlova's death in 1931, he continued to be involved in ballet and toured the world with groups of Russians. He wrote Anna Pavlovna in Art and Life (1932) in London. From 1938, he managed Colonel Wassily de Basil's Ballets Russes, later renaming them the Royal Covent Garden Russian Ballet Company.

He died in London on 5 February 1944.

== Publications ==
- "Anna Pavlova in Time" (1931)
- "Anna Pavlova in Art and Life" (1932)
