= Princeton Municipal Airport (Minnesota) =

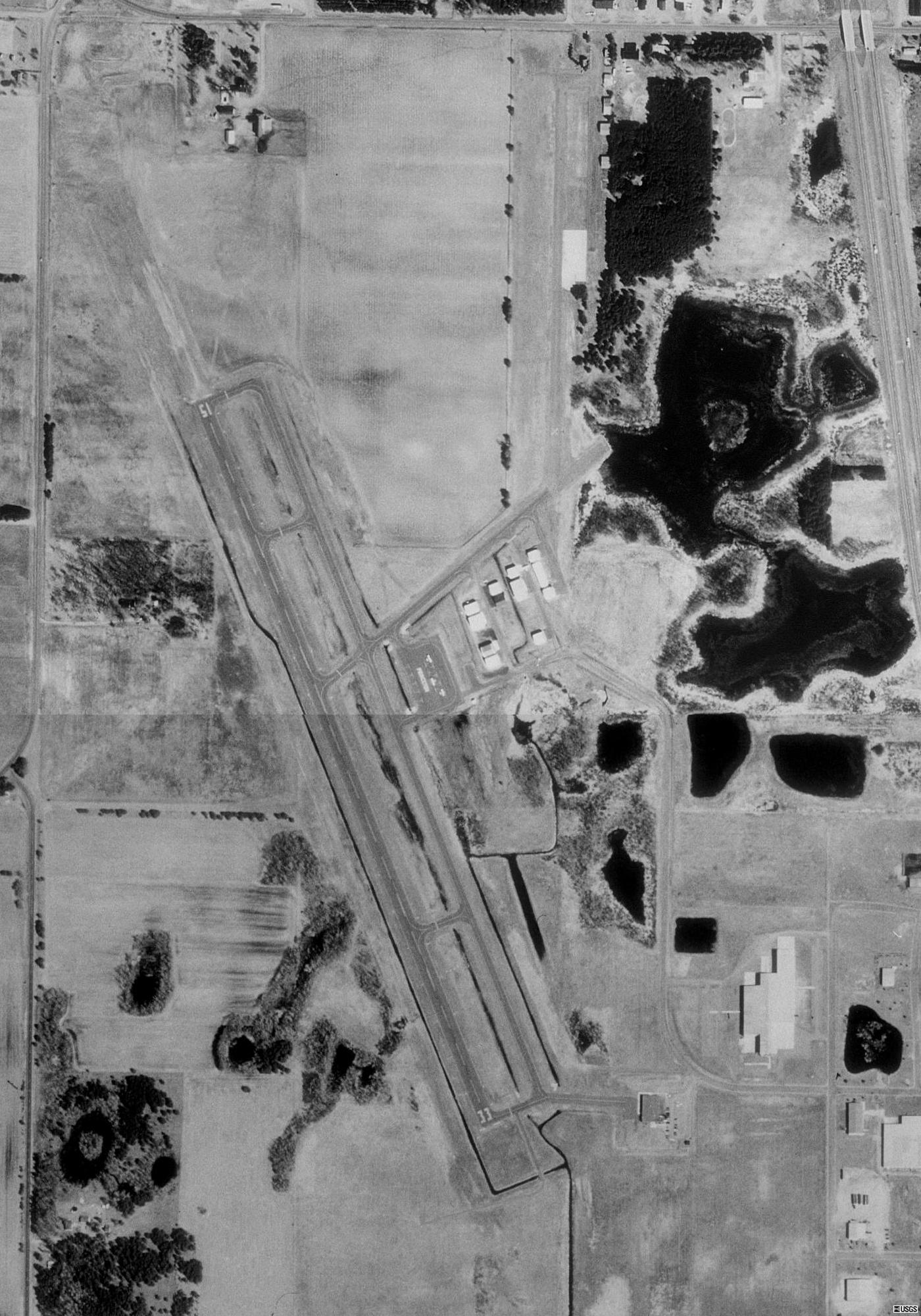
- USGS aerial image - 21 April 1991
- IATA: none; ICAO: KPNM; FAA LID: PNM

Summary
- Airport type: Public
- Owner: City of Princeton
- Serves: Princeton, Minnesota
- Elevation AMSL: 980 ft / 299 m
- Coordinates: 45°33′36″N 093°36′30″W

Map
- Location of airport in Minnesota/United States PNM (the United States)

Runways
Direction	Length		Surface
Direction	ft	m	Surface
15/33	3,900	1,189	Asphalt

Statistics (2005)
- Aircraft operations: 13,300
- Based aircraft: 34
- Sources: Minnesota DOT, FAA

Princeton Municipal Airport (ICAO: KPNM, FAA LID: PNM) is a city-owned public-use airport located one nautical mile (1.85 km) southwest of the central business district of Princeton, a city in Mille Lacs County, Minnesota, United States. This airport is included in the FAA's National Plan of Integrated Airport Systems 2015–2019, which categorizes it as a general aviation airport.

Although most U.S. airports use the same three-letter location identifier for the FAA and IATA, this airport is assigned PNM by the FAA but has no designation from the IATA.

== History ==
The Federal Aviation Administration relocated the flight service station (FSS) for Minnesota to Princeton in 1987. The airport was completely renovated in 1988.

== Facilities and aircraft ==
Princeton Municipal Airport covers an area of 304 acres (123 ha) at an elevation of 980 feet (299 m) above mean sea level. It has one runway designated 15/33 with an asphalt surface measuring 3,900 by 75 feet (1,189 x 23 m).

For the 12-month period ending August 31, 2005, the airport had 13,300 aircraft operations, an average of 36 per day: 98% general aviation and 2% military. At that time there were 34 aircraft based at this airport: 85% single-engine, 3% multi-engine, 3% helicopter and 8% ultralight.

== See also ==
- List of airports in Minnesota
