= Anna Pavlova =

Russian ballet dancer (1881–1931)

- Анна Павлова
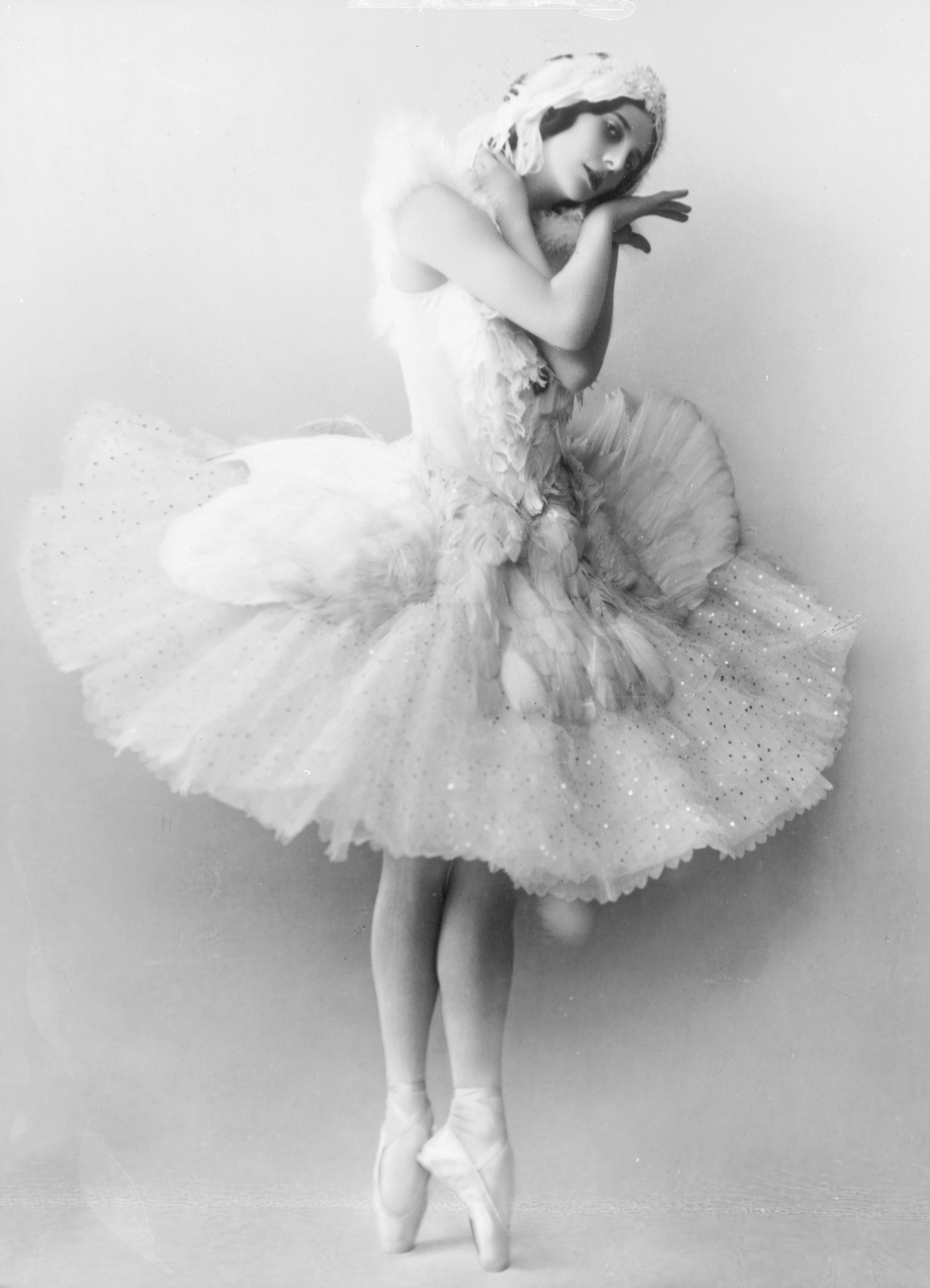
- Pavlova, c. 1905
- Born: Anna Matveyevna Pavlova; 12 February 1881; Saint Petersburg, Russia
- Died: 23 January 1931 (aged 49); The Hague, Netherlands
- Occupation: Ballet dancer
- Years active: 1899–1931
- Spouse: Victor Dandré (m. 1914)

Anna Pavlovna Pavlova (Note: In this name that follows East Slavic naming customs, the patronymic is Pavlovna and the family name is Pavlova.) (Note: /pævˈloʊvə/ pav-LOH-və, US also /pɑːv-/ pahv-, UK also /ˈpævləvə, ˈpɑːv-/ PA(H)V-lə-və; Russian: Анна Павловна Павлова, IPA: [ˈanːə ˈpavləvə].) (born Anna Matveyevna Pavlova; (Note: Russian: Анна Матвеевна Павлова.) 12 February [O.S. 31 January] 1881 – 23 January 1931) was a Russian prima ballerina. She was a principal artist of the Imperial Russian Ballet and the Ballets Russes of Sergei Diaghilev, but is most recognized for creating the role of The Dying Swan and, with her own company, being the first ballerina to tour the world, including South America, India, Mexico and Australia.

== Early life ==
Anna Matveyevna Pavlova was born in the Preobrazhensky Regiment hospital in 1881, Saint Petersburg where her father, Matvey Pavlovich Pavlov, served. Some sources say that her parents married just before her birth; others say it was years later. Her mother, Lyubov Feodorovna Pavlova, came from peasants and worked as a laundress at the house of a Russian-Jewish banker, Lazar Polyakov, for some time. When Anna rose to fame, Polyakov's son Vladimir claimed that she was an illegitimate daughter of his father; others speculated Matvey came from Crimean Karaites (there is a monument in one of Yevpatoria's kenesas dedicated to Pavlova), yet both legends find no historical proof. Anna Matveyevna changed her patronymic to Pavlovna when she started performing on stage.

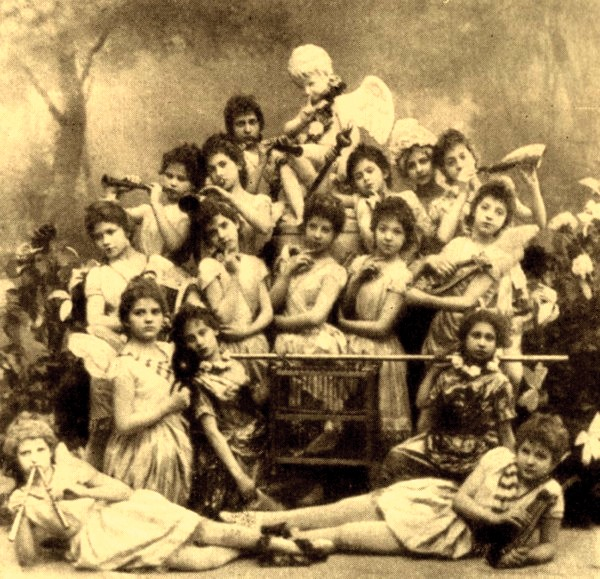
Students of the Imperial Ballet School, St. Petersburg, in Marius Petipa's Un conte de fées. A ten-year-old A Pavlova (kneeling on left, holding birdcage) appeared in her first ever ballet performance. 1891.

Pavlova was a premature child, regularly felt ill and was soon sent to the Ligovo village where her grandmother looked after her. Pavlova's passion for the art of ballet took off when her mother took her to a performance of Marius Petipa's original production of The Sleeping Beauty at the Imperial Maryinsky Theatre in 1890. The lavish spectacle made an impression on Pavlova. When she was nine, her mother took her to audition for the Imperial Ballet School. Because of her youth and sickly appearance, she was rejected, but, at age 10, in 1891, she was accepted. She appeared for the first time on stage in Petipa's Un conte de fées (A Fairy Tale), which the ballet master staged for the students of the school.

== Imperial Ballet School ==
Young Pavlova's years of classical ballet training were difficult. Her severely arched feet, thin ankles and long limbs clashed with the small, compact body favoured for the ballerina of the time. Her fellow students taunted her with such nicknames as The broom and La petite sauvage. Undeterred, she trained to improve her technique. She practised repeatedly after learning a step. She said: "No one can arrive from being talented alone. God gives talent, work transforms talent into genius." She took extra lessons from the noted teachers of the day—Christian Johansson, Pavel Gerdt, Nikolai Legat—and from Enrico Cecchetti, considered the greatest ballet virtuoso of the time and founder of the Cecchetti method, a very influential ballet technique used to this day. In 1898, she entered the classe de perfection of Ekaterina Vazem, former Prima ballerina of the Saint Petersburg Imperial Theatres.

During her final year at the Imperial Ballet School, Pavlova performed many roles with the principal company. She graduated in 1899 at age 18, chosen to enter the Imperial Ballet a rank ahead of corps de ballet as a coryphée. She made her official début at the Mariinsky Theatre in Pavel Gerdt's Les Dryades prétendues (The False Dryads). Her performance drew praise from the critics, particularly Nikolai Bezobrazov.

== Career ==
=== St. Petersburg ===
==== Marius Petipa ====
At the height of Petipa's strict academicism, the public was taken aback by Pavlova's style, a combination of a gift that paid little heed to academic rules: she frequently performed with bent knees, bad turnout, misplaced port de bras and incorrectly placed tours. Such a style, in many ways, harkened back to the time of the romantic ballet and the great ballerinas of old.

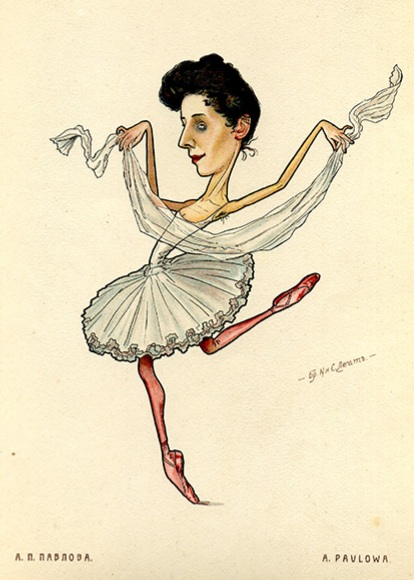
Caricature of Pavlova as Nikiya in La Bayadère by the brothers Nikolai Legat and Sergei Legat for their book The Russian Ballet In Caricatures. 1903

Pavlova performed in various classical variations, pas de deux and pas de trois in such ballets as La Camargo, Le Roi Candaule, Marcobomba and The Sleeping Beauty. Her enthusiasm often led her astray: once during a performance as the River Thames in Petipa's The Pharaoh's Daughter her energetic double pique turns led her to lose her balance and fall into the prompter's box. Her weak ankles led to difficulty while performing as the fairy Candide in Petipa's The Sleeping Beauty, leading the ballerina to revise the fairy's jumps en pointe, much to the surprise of the Ballet Master. She tried desperately to imitate the renowned Pierina Legnani, Prima ballerina assoluta of the Imperial Theatres. Once, during class, she attempted Legnani's famous fouettés, causing her teacher, Pavel Gerdt, to fly into a rage. He told her,

... leave acrobatics to others. It is positively more than I can bear to see the pressure such steps put on your delicate muscles and the severe arch of your foot. I beg you to never again try to imitate those who are physically stronger than you. You must realize that your daintiness and fragility are your greatest assets. You should always do the kind of dancing which brings out your own rare qualities instead of trying to win praise by mere acrobatic tricks.

Pavlova rose through the ranks quickly, becoming a favourite of the old maestro Petipa. From him she learned the title role in Paquita, Princess Aspicia in The Pharaoh's Daughter, Queen Nisia in Le Roi Candaule and Giselle. She was named danseuse in 1902, première danseuse in 1905 and prima ballerina in 1906 after a resounding performance in Giselle. Petipa revised many grand pas for her, as well as many supplemental variations. She was much celebrated by the fanatical balletomanes of Tsarist Saint Petersburg, her legions of fans calling themselves the Pavlovatzi.

When the ballerina Mathilde Kschessinska was pregnant in 1901, she coached Pavlova in the role of Nikiya in La Bayadère. Kschessinska, not wanting to be upstaged, was certain Pavlova would fail in the role, as she was considered technically inferior because of her small ankles and lithe legs. Instead, audiences became enchanted with Pavlova and her frail, ethereal look, which fit the role perfectly, particularly in the scene The Kingdom of the Shades.

==== Michel Fokine ====
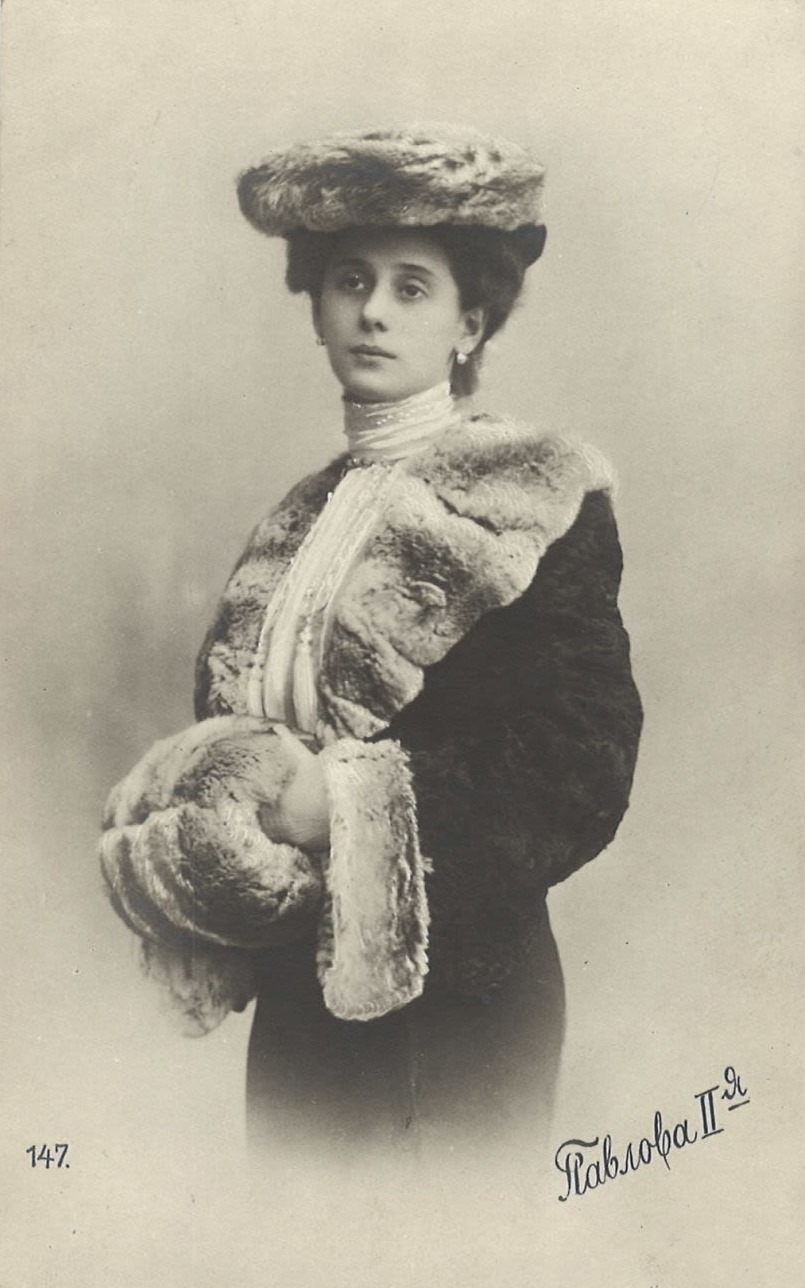
Anna Pavlova in 1905

Pavlova is perhaps most renowned for creating the role of The Dying Swan, a solo choreographed for her by Michel Fokine. The ballet, created in 1905, is danced to Le cygne from The Carnival of the Animals by Camille Saint-Saëns. She also choreographed several solos herself, one of which is The Dragonfly, a short ballet set to music by Fritz Kreisler. While performing it, she wore a gossamer gown with large dragonfly wings fixed to the back.

Pavlova had a rivalry with Tamara Karsavina. According to the film A Portrait of Giselle, Karsavina recalls a wardrobe malfunction during a performance; her shoulder straps fell, exposing her breasts and Pavlova helped embarrass her to tears.

=== Ballets Russes ===
In the first years of the Ballets Russes, Pavlova worked briefly for Sergei Diaghilev. Originally, she was to dance the lead in Mikhail Fokine's The Firebird, but refused the part, as she could not come to terms with Igor Stravinsky's avant-garde score, and the role was given to Tamara Karsavina. All her life, she preferred the melodious "musique dansante" of the old maestros such as Cesare Pugni and Ludwig Minkus, caring little for anything else which strayed from the salon-style ballet music of the 19th century.

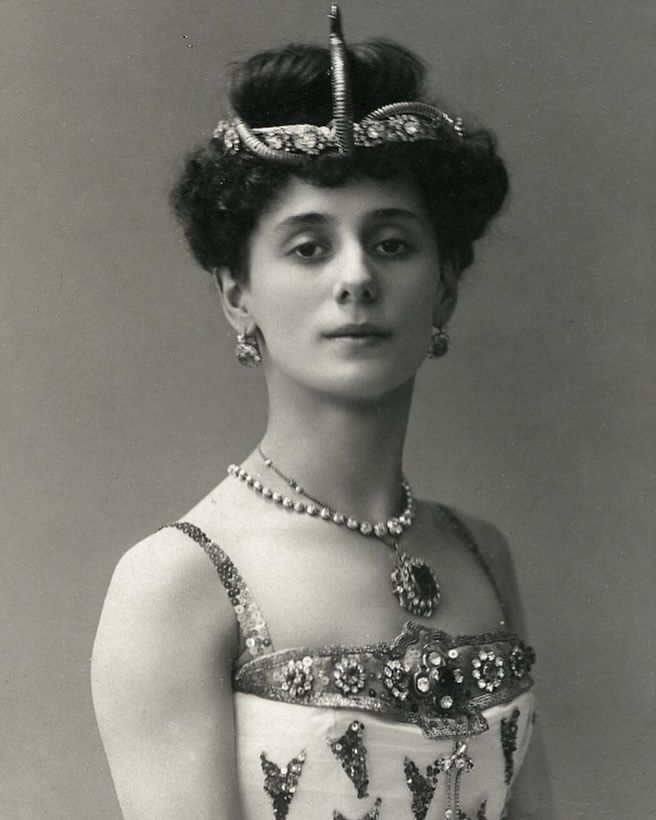
Photographic postcard of Anna Pavlova as the Princess Aspicia in Alexander Gorsky's version of the Petipa/Pugni The Pharaoh's Daughter for the Bolshoi Theatre. Moscow, 1908

=== Pavlova's ballet company ===
==== Touring the world ====
After the first Paris season of Ballets Russes, Pavlova left it to form her own company. It performed throughout the world, with a repertory primarily of abridgements of Petipa's works and pieces choreographed specially for her. Going independent was

"a very enterprising and daring act. She toured on her own... for twenty years until her death. She traveled everywhere in the world that travel was possible, and introduced the ballet to millions who had never seen any form of Western dancing."

Pavlova also performed many 'ethnic' dances, some of which she learned from local teachers during her travels. In addition to the dances of her native Russia, she performed Mexican, Japanese and East Indian dances. Supported by her interest, Uday Shankar, her dance partner in "Krishna Radha" (1923), went on to revive the long-neglected art of the dance in his native India. She also toured China.

In 1916, she produced a 50-minute adaptation of The Sleeping Beauty in New York City. Members of her company were largely English girls with Russianized names. In 1918–1919, her company toured throughout South America, during which time Pavlova exerted an influence on the young American ballerina Ruth Page.

In 1915, she appeared in the film The Dumb Girl of Portici, in which she played a mute girl betrayed by an aristocrat.

==== England ====
After leaving Russia, Pavlova moved to London, England, settling, in 1912, at the Ivy House on North End Road, Golders Green, north of Hampstead Heath, where she lived for the rest of her life. The house had an ornamental lake where she fed her pet swans, and where now stands a statue of her by the Scots sculptor George Henry Paulin. The house was featured in the film Anna Pavlova. It used to be the London Jewish Cultural Centre, but a blue plaque marks it as a site of significant historical interest being Pavlova's home. While in London, Pavlova was influential in the development of British ballet, most notably inspiring the career of Alicia Markova. The Gate public house (https://thegatearkley.co.uk) located on the border of Arkley and Totteridge (London Borough of Barnet), has a story, framed on its walls, describing a visit by Pavlova and her dance company.

There are at least five memorials to Pavlova in London, England: a contemporary sculpture by Tom Merrifield of Pavlova as the Dragonfly in the grounds of Ivy House, a sculpture by Scot George Henry Paulin in the middle of the Ivy House pond, a blue plaque on the front of Ivy House, a statuette sitting with the urn that holds her ashes in Golders Green Crematorium and the gilded statue atop the Victoria Palace Theatre. When the Victoria Palace Theatre in London, England, opened in 1911, a gilded statue of Pavlova had been installed above the cupola of the theatre. This was taken down for its safety during World War II and was lost. In 2006, a replica of the original statue was restored in its place.

In 1928, Anna Pavlova engaged St. Petersburg conductor Efrem Kurtz to accompany her dancing, which he did until her death in 1931. During the last five years of her life, one of her soloists, Cleo Nordi, another St Petersburg ballerina, became her dedicated assistant, having left the Paris Opera Ballet in 1926 to join her company and accompanied her on her second Australian tour to Adelaide, Brisbane and Sydney in 1929. On the way back on board ship, Nordi married Pavlova's British musical director, Walford Hyden. Nordi kept Pavlova's flame burning in London, well into the 1970s, where she tutored hundreds of pupils including many ballet stars.

Pavlova dancing The Dying Swan, 1905

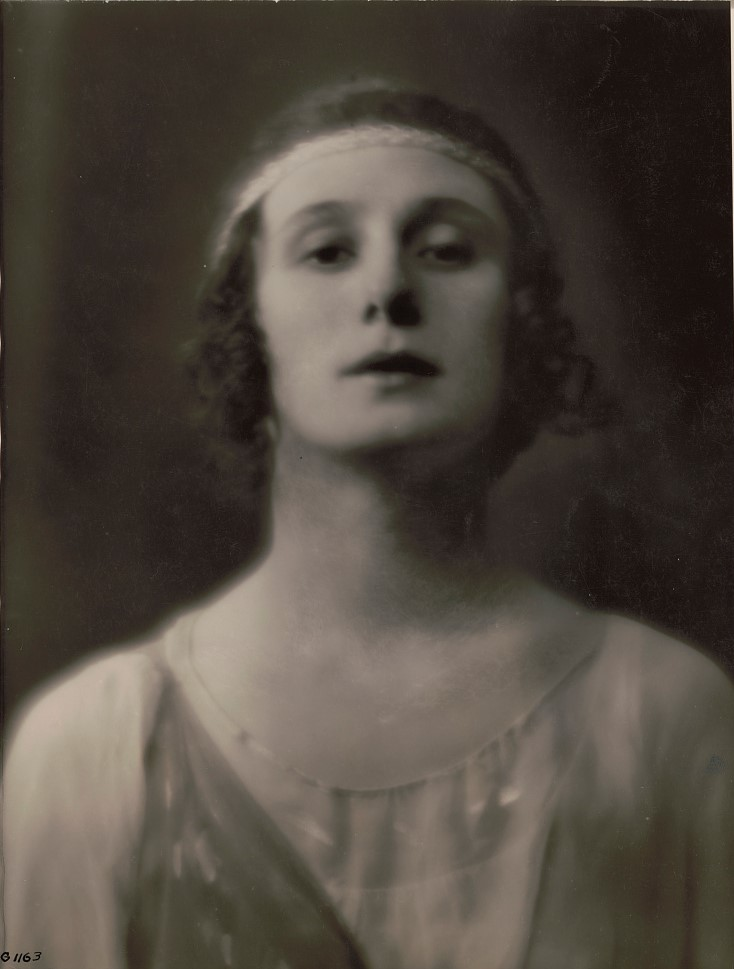
Arnold Genthe, Anna Pavlova, 1915, Library of Congress

==== United States ====
Between 1912 and 1926, Pavlova made almost annual tours of the United States, traveling from coast to coast.

"A generation of dancers turned to the art because of her. She roused America as no one had done since Elssler. ... America became Pavlova-conscious and therefore ballet-conscious. Dance and passion, dance and drama were fused."

Boston

Pavlova was introduced to audiences in the United States by Max Rabinoff during his time as managing director of the Boston Grand Opera Company from 1914 to 1917 and was featured there with her Russian Ballet Company during that period.

St. Louis

In 1914, Pavlova performed in St. Louis, Missouri, after being engaged at the last minute by Hattie B. Gooding, responsible for a series of worthy musical attractions presented to the St. Louis public during the season of 1913–14. Gooding went to New York to arrange with the musical managers for the attractions offered. Out of a long list, she selected those who represent the highest in their own special field and which she felt sure St. Louisans would enjoy. The list began with Madame Louise Homer, prima donna contralto of the Metropolitan Grand Opera Co., followed by Josef Hofmann, pianist, Pavlova with the Russian ballet. For the last, the expenses were $5,500.00 ($179,167 in 2025 dollars) for two nights, and the receipts $7,500.00 ($244,318 in 2025 dollars), netting a clear gain of $2,000.00 ($65,152 in 2025 dollars); her other evenings were proportionately successful financially. The advance sales were greater than any other city in the United States. At the Pavlova concert, when Gooding engaged, at the last hour, the Russian dancer for two nights, the New York managers became dubious and anxiously rushed four special advance agents to assist her. On seeing the bookings for both nights, they quietly slipped back to New York fully convinced of her ability to attract audiences in St. Louis, which had always, heretofore, been called "the worst show town" in the country.

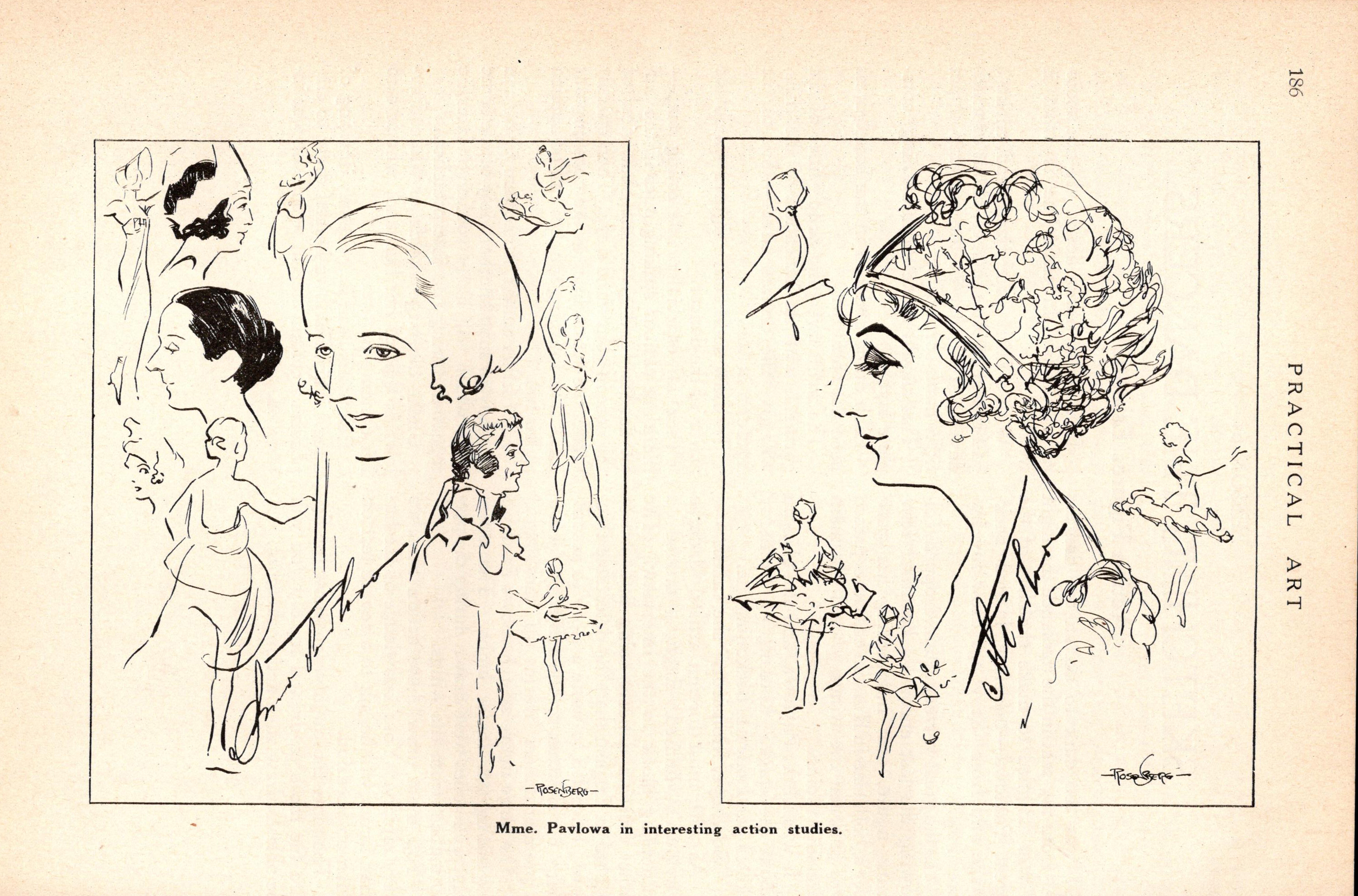
Anna Pavlova signed sketch by Manuel Rosenberg 1922

== Personal life ==
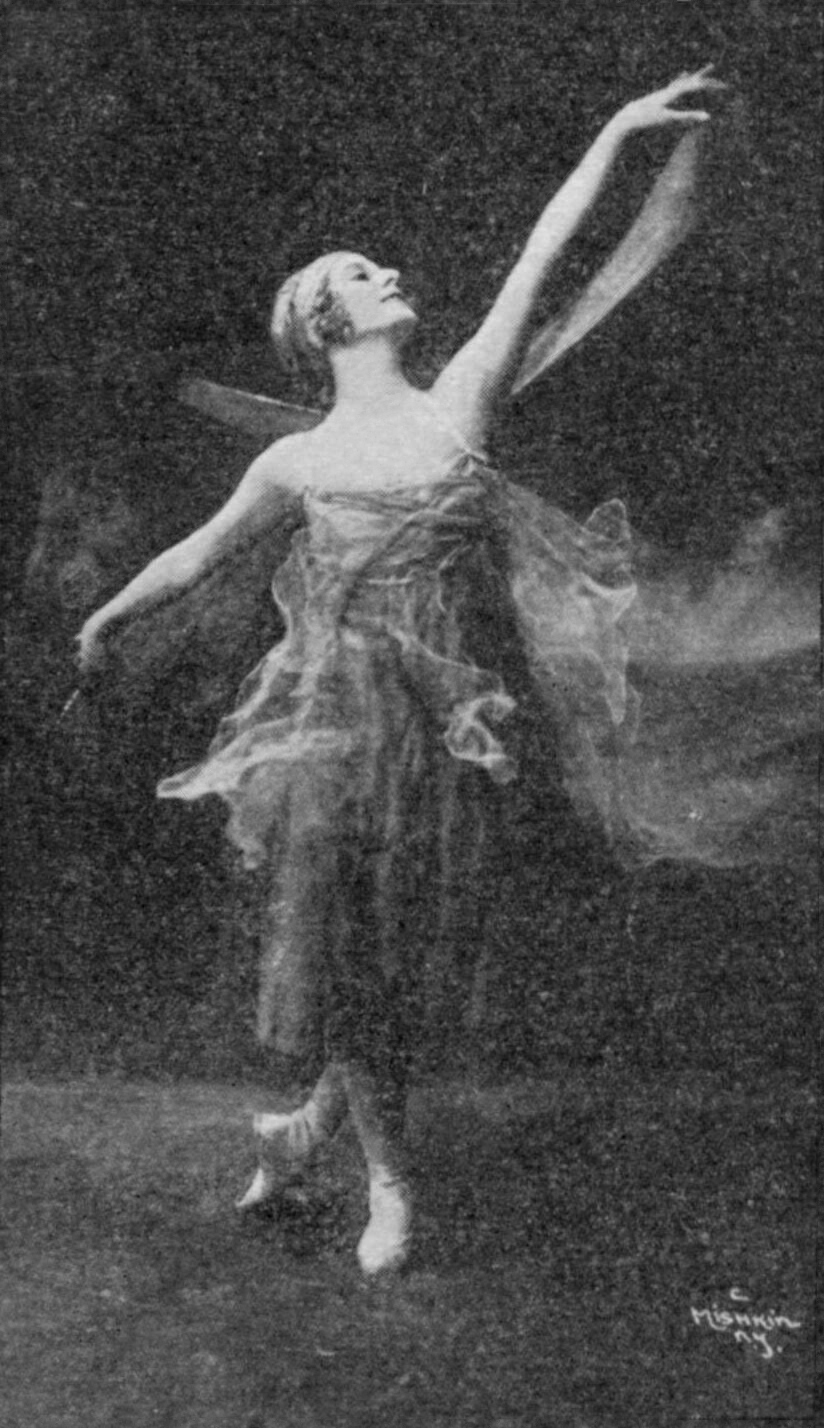
Pavlova dancing, mid-1910s

Victor Dandré, her manager and companion, said he was her husband in his biography of the dancer in 1932, Anna Pavlova: In Art and Life.(Dandré 1932, author's foreword) They had secretly married in 1914 after first meeting in 1904 (some sources say 1900). He died on 5 February 1944 and was cremated at Golders Green Crematorium and his ashes placed below those of Anna.

Dandré wrote of Pavlova's many charity dance performances and charitable efforts to support Russian orphans in post-World War I Paris

...who were in danger of finding themselves literally in the street. They were already suffering terrible privations and it seemed as though there would soon be no means whatever to carry on their education.

Fifteen girls were adopted into a home Pavlova purchased near Paris at Saint-Cloud, overseen by the Comtesse de Guerne and supported by her performances and funds solicited by Pavlova, including many small donations from members of the Camp Fire Girls of America, who made her an honorary member.

During her life, she had many pets, including a Siamese cat, various dogs and many birds, including swans. Dandré indicated she was a lifelong animal lover, corroborated by photographic portraits for which she sat, often with an animal she loved. A formal studio portrait was taken of her with Jack, her favourite swan.

== Death ==
Pavlova arriving in The Hague in 1927

While traveling from Paris to The Hague, Pavlova became ill, and her condition worsened after her arrival. She sent to Paris for her personal physician, Zalewski, to attend her. She died of pleurisy in the bedroom next to the Japanese Salon of the Hotel Des Indes in The Hague twenty days short of her 50th birthday.

Victor Dandré wrote that Pavlova died a half hour past midnight on Friday, 23 January 1931, with her maid Marguerite Létienne, Zalevsky and himself at her bedside. Her last words were, "Get my 'Swan' costume ready." Dandré and Létienne dressed her body in her favourite beige lace dress and placed her in a coffin with a sprig of lilac. At 7 am, a Russian Orthodox priest arrived to say prayers over her body. At 7:30 am, her coffin was taken to the mortuary chapel attaching the Catholic hospital in The Hague.

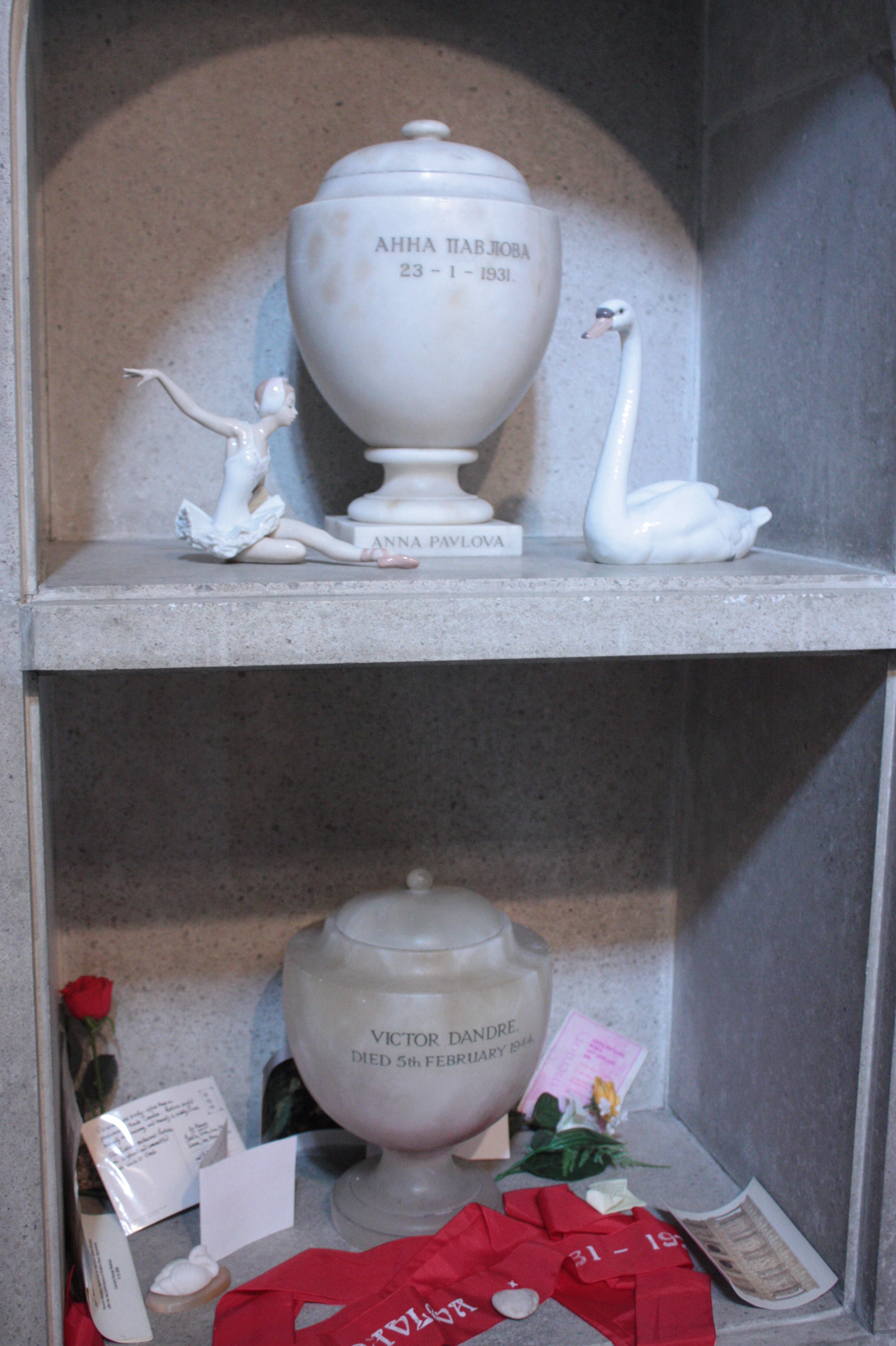
The ashes of Pavlova, above those of Victor Dandré, Golders Green Crematorium, London

In accordance with old ballet tradition, on the day she was to have next performed, the show went on, as scheduled, with a single spotlight circling an empty stage where Pavlova would have been. Memorial services were held in the Russian Orthodox Church in London. She was cremated and her ashes placed in a columbarium at Golders Green Crematorium, where her urn was adorned with her ballet shoes (which have since been stolen).

Pavlova's ashes have been a source of much controversy, following attempts by Valentina Zhilenkova and Moscow mayor Yury Luzhkov to have them flown to Moscow for interment in the Novodevichy Cemetery. These attempts were based on claims that it was Pavlova's dying wish that her ashes be returned to Russia following the fall of the Soviet Union. These claims were later found to be false, as there is no evidence to suggest that this was her wish at all. The only documented evidence that suggests that such a move would be possible is in the will of Pavlova's husband, who stipulated that, if Russian authorities agreed to such a move and treated her remains with proper reverence, then the crematorium caretakers should agree to it. Despite this clause, the will does not contain a formal request or plans for a posthumous journey to Russia.

The most recent attempt to move Pavlova's remains to Russia came in 2001. Golders Green Crematorium had made arrangements for them to be flown to Russia for interment on 14 March 2001 in a ceremony to be attended by various Russian dignitaries. This plan was later abandoned after Russian authorities withdrew permission for the move. It was later revealed that neither Pavlova's family nor the Russian Government had sanctioned the move and that they had agreed the remains should stay in London.

== Filmography ==
Year	Title	Role	Note
1916	The Dumb Girl of Portici	Fenella	
1925	The Dying Swan	Swan	Short film

== Legacy ==
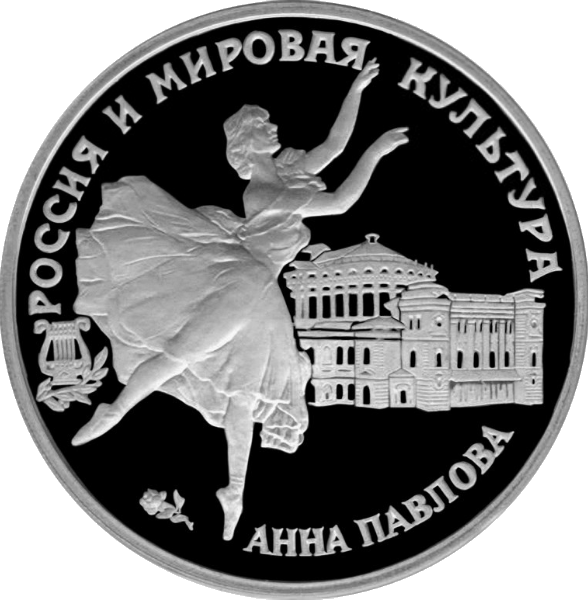
Commemorative coin, Central Bank of Russia

=== Inspirations to artists ===
- Pavlova inspired choreographer Frederick Ashton (1904–1988), who as a boy of 13, saw her dance in the Municipal Theatre in Lima, Peru.

=== Tributes in the names of objects and practices ===
- The Pavlova dessert is named after her.
- The Jarabe Tapatío, known in English as the "Mexican Hat Dance", gained popularity outside of Mexico when Pavlova created a staged version in pointe shoes, for which she was showered with hats by her adoring Mexican audiences. Afterward, in 1924, the Jarabe Tapatío was proclaimed Mexico's national dance.
- Botanist Roger William Butcher in 1952, circumscribed Pavlova which is a genus of algae, belonging to the family Pavlovaceae. This was named so, because "the movement of the type species, Pavlova gyrans, is positively balletic".
- In 1980, Igor Carl Faberge licensed a collection of 8-inch full-lead crystal wine glasses to commemorate the centenary of Pavlova's birth. The glasses were crafted in Japan under the supervision of The Franklin Mint. A frosted image of Pavlova appears in the stem of each glass. Originally each set contained 12 glasses.
- A McDonnell Douglas MD-11 of the Dutch airline KLM, with the registration PH-KCH carried her name. It was delivered on 31 August 1995.

=== Depictions in art ===
Film

- Pavlova's life was depicted in the 1983 film Anna Pavlova.
- Pavlova appears as a character, played by Maria Tallchief, in the 1952 film Million Dollar Mermaid.
- Pavlova appears as a character in Rosario Ferre's novel of 2001, Flight of the Swan.

TV

- Pavlova appears as a character in the fourth episode of the British series Mr Selfridge (2013), played by real-life ballerina Natalia Kremen.
- Nicole Volossetski portrays Pavlova in episode 9 of season 19 "Sugar Plum Murdoch" (1 December 2025) of the Canadian television period detective series Murdoch Mysteries.
- Anna Pavlova was featured in a Manga called The War of Greedy Witches (2020), as a fighter and one of the 32 participants.

Painting

- Pavlova's dances inspired many artworks of the Irish painter John Lavery. The critic of The Observer wrote on 16 April 1911: "Mr. Lavery's portrait of the Russian dancer Anna Pavlova, caught in a moment of graceful, weightless movement ... Her miraculous, feather-like flight, which seems to defy the law of gravitation".

Literature

- The Swiss author Robert Walser wrote a prose piece describing Pavlova when she was in Berlin, "On the Russian Ballet" (1909), which is included in the 2012 English-language collection Berlin Stories.

== Pointe shoes ==
Pavlova's feet were extremely arched, so she strengthened her pointe shoe by adding a piece of hard leather on the soles for support and flattening the box of the shoe. At the time, many considered this "cheating", for a ballerina of the era was taught that she, not her shoes, must hold her weight en pointe. In Pavlova's case, this was extremely difficult, as the shape of her feet required her to balance her weight on her big toes. Her solution became, over time, the precursor of the modern pointe shoe, as pointe work became less painful and easier for curved feet. According to Margot Fonteyn's biography, Pavlova did not like the way her invention looked in photographs, so she would remove it or have the photographs altered so that it appeared she was using a normal pointe shoe.

== Choreographic notation ==
At the turn of the 20th century, the Imperial Ballet began a project that notated much of its repertory in the Stepanov method of choreographic notation. Most of the notated choreographies were recorded while dancers were being taken through rehearsals. After the revolution of 1917, this collection of notation was taken out of Russia by the Imperial Ballet's former régisseur Nicholas Sergeyev, who utilized these documents to stage such works as The Nutcracker, The Sleeping Beauty and Swan Lake, as well as Marius Petipa's definitive versions of Giselle and of Coppélia for the Paris Opéra Ballet and the Vic-Wells Ballet of London (precursor of the Royal Ballet). The productions of these works formed the foundation from which all subsequent versions would be based to one extent or another. Eventually, these notations were acquired by Harvard University and are now part of the cache of materials relating to the Imperial Ballet known as the Sergeyev Collection that includes not only the notated ballets but rehearsal scores as used by the company at the turn of the 20th century.

The notations of Giselle and the full-length Paquita were recorded c. 1901–1902 while Marius Petipa himself took Anna Pavlova through rehearsals. Pavlova is also included in some of the other notated choreographies when she participated in performances as a soloist. Several of the violin or piano reductions used as rehearsal scores reflect the variations that Pavlova chose to dance in a particular performance, since, at that time, classical variations were often performed ad libitum, i.e. at the dancer's choice. One variation, in particular, was performed by Pavlova in several ballets, being composed by Riccardo Drigo for Pavlova's performance in Petipa's ballet Le Roi candaule that features a solo harp. This variation is still performed in modern times in the Mariinsky Ballet's staging of the Paquita grand pas classique.

== Repertoire ==
Pavlova's repertoire includes the following roles:

Date	Ballet	Role(s)	Location	Notes
1891	A Fairy Tale			
1905	The Dying Swan	Dying Swan	Saint Petersburg	
1921	La Péri (Dukas)	Peri	Paris	
	Giselle			
	La Camargo			
	Les Dryades prétendues		Saint Petersburg	
	Le Roi Candaule	Queen Nisia		
	Marcobomba			
	Paquita	Paquita		
	The Pharaoh's Daughter	Princess Aspicia, River Thames		
	The Sleeping Beauty			

== See also ==
- List of dancers
- List of Russian ballet dancers
- Women in dance

== Sources ==
- Dandré, Victor (1979). Anna Pavlova: In Art & Life. London: USA Arno Press NYC, reprint.
- Bernatas, E. E.; Vlasova, T. V. (2006). Anna Pavlova (in Russian). St Petersburg: Art Deco. ISBN 5-89576-013-9.
- Andreeva, Julia (2019). Театр – волшебное окно [Theatre – a Window to Wonders] (in Russian). 'Skifiya' Publishing house. ISBN 978-5-00025-170-6.
