= The Fairies (TV series) =

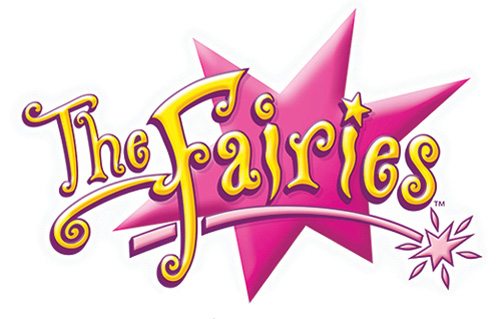
- Genre: Children's television Preschool; Live-Action
- Created by: Jenifer 'Jen' Watts (showrunner)
- Written by: Mandy Hancock-Varga (2009); Jenifer 'Jen' Watts (showrunner)
- Directed by: David Hancock (The Fairies/Fairy Hello!, A Fairy Merry Christmas and Farmyard Magic); Mark Evans (2007); Mat King (2005); Tait Muller (2009)
- Starring: Lindy Allen; Peppa Blackburn; Stuart Boag; Rhys Bobridge; Wally Carr; Joni Combe; Ruth Natalie Fallon; Adam Goodburn; Candice Moll; PJ Oaten; Jenifer 'Jen' Watts (showrunner)
- Theme music composer: Robert 'Rob' Pippan (TV series); Susan 'Sue' Scott (The Fairies/Fairy Hello!, A Fairy Merry Christmas, Farmyard Magic and A Magical Fairy Party album); Jenifer 'Jen' Watts (showrunner)
- Opening theme: The Fairies performed by Jenifer 'Jen' Watts (The Fairies/Fairy Hello! and A Fairy Merry Christmas); Hello from the Fairies performed by Jenifer 'Jen' Watts & Joni Combe (Farmyard Magic and A Magical Fairy Party album); The Fairies Theme Song performed by Candice Moll & Ruth Natalie Fallon (TV series)
- Ending theme: Now We Have To Go
- Composers: Susan 'Sue' Scott (The Fairies/Fairy Hello!, A Fairy Merry Christmas and Farmyard Magic); Jenifer 'Jen' Watts (showrunner)
- Country of origin: Australia
- Original language: English

Production
- Executive producer: Jenifer 'Jen' Watts (showrunner)
- Producer: David Hancock
- Production locations: Adelaide, South Australia
- Running time: 60 minutes 30 minutes
- Production company: South Australian Film Corporation

Original release
- Network: Direct-to-Video (1998, 2000); ABC for Kids (VHS, DVD and CD releases only); Seven Network (TV series)
- Release: 1998 – 2000; November 2005 – 2009 (TV series)

The Fairies is an Australian preschool live-action children's television series created by Jenifer 'Jen' Watts and is based on two fairies: Harmony and Rainbow Rhapsody (known in the TV series as just Rhapsody). They also have friends, including Elf the Fairy Cake Maker, Barnaby the Bizzy Buzzy Bee and Wizzy the Wizard. Each episode of the third TV series would contain songs and dance routines. Originally it was a direct-to-video film series released by PolyGram Filmed Entertainment Australia in 1998 (The Fairies and A Fairy Merry Christmas) and ABC Video in 2000, before becoming a TV series in 2005. ABC for Kids released the TV series on DVD in 2005–09 (along with Christmas Ballet: Stage Show released in 2011), with merchandise releasing in Australia and America throughout the program's run and tours.

== History ==
The history of the show started in 1996 with Harmony, Rhapsody, Barnaby, Elf and four tots. The producers of the series made three direct-to-video releases: two in 1998 (The Fairies/Fairy Hello! and A Fairy Merry Christmas) and one in 2000 (Farmyard Magic, along with re-releases of the first two videos from ABC). The creator of the show, Jenifer Karen 'Jen' Watts, was inspired by her daughter, Abigail Kate 'Abbie' (born 1994)'s obsession with glitter and fairies. Two different actors replaced the 1998 portrayers of Harmony and Elf (Watts and Stuart Boag). These two characters were replaced by Lindy Allen and Rhys Bobridge. The little tots were also reduced to three. These changes were done to boost the popularity of the show as a multi-million dollar 26 part television series that was in production.

In November 2005, The Fairies came to television for the first time, airing on the Seven Network in Australia, going into a 9am time slot. The Fairies was made more realistic and magical, making it more like a fantasy drama for children. New Zealand-based WETA Workshop (the outfit behind the special effects used in King Kong and The Lord of the Rings) designed the sets. Also, the actors were replaced, except for Elf. Harmony, who was the Golden Fairy, and Rhapsody, the Rainbow (hence her original/vintage name, Rainbow Rhapsody), were also changed into more 'girly' colours, pink and purple. Elf and Barnaby's costumes' were also changed. Elf looked more 'Elfy' and Barnaby lost two of his legs. The tots costumes and actors were also revamped, making them more cheeky, and dressing them to look more sophisticated. Wizzy, the Wizard, also debuted in the first TV series (along with his actual debut on the album A Magical Fairy Party (released in 2001)). The first TV series of the show repeated in April 2006 on the Seven Network, going back into the 9am time slot.

In 2007, the show's second TV series was produced, and aired on the Seven Network from 23 April. It also added two new characters, Bubbles the Beach Fairy and Twinkle the Tooth Fairy. Sales of the DVDs in Australia have topped 100,000 units.

The show's third TV series aired in 2009 and featured 4 new characters, Jethro the Jitterboy, Cordeline the Clever Pixie, Rainbow the Birthday Fairy and Fairy Princess Minuet the Dancing Fairy.

== Characters ==
=== Main characters ===
- Harmony: Jenifer 'Jen' Watts (The Fairies/Fairy Hello!, A Fairy Merry Christmas and A Magical Fairy Party album) and Lindy Allen (Farmyard Magic) as the Golden Fairy, then Candice Moll (TV series) and Tiffany Welden-Iley (Christmas Ballet: Stage Show and Carols in the Domain 2011) as the Purple Fairy
- Rhapsody: Joni Combe (Note: Daughter of singer-songwriter Peter Combe) (Note: Also known as a presenter of Here's Humphrey from 1995 to 2000) (The Fairies/Fairy Hello!, A Fairy Merry Christmas, Farmyard Magic and A Magical Fairy Party album) as Rainbow Rhapsody, then Ruth Natalie Fallon (TV series) and Lulu Freedman (Christmas Ballet: Stage Show and Carols in the Domain 2011) as just Rhapsody the Pink Fairy
- Barnaby the Bizzy Buzzy Bee: Wally Carr (The Fairies/Fairy Hello!, A Fairy Merry Christmas and Farmyard Magic), then PJ Oaten (A Magical Fairy Party album, TV series, Christmas Ballet: Stage Show and Carols in the Domain 2011)
- Elf the Fairy Cake Maker: Stuart Boag (The Fairies/Fairy Hello! and A Fairy Merry Christmas), then Rhys Bobridge (Farmyard Magic, 2005, 2007) and Paul Maybury (Christmas Ballet: Stage Show and Carols in the Domain 2011)
- Wizzy the Wizard: Adam Goodburn (A Magical Fairy Party album, TV series), then Kent Green (Christmas Ballet: Stage Show)
- Fairy Princess Minuet the Dancing Fairy: Peppa Blackburn (2009, Christmas Ballet: Stage Show and Carols in the Domain 2011)

=== Other Adult characters ===
- Tilly the Tooth Fairy: Selina Vistoli (The Fairies/Fairy Hello!)
- Santa Claus: John Skidmore (A Fairy Merry Christmas), then John Greene (Christmas Carols in Fairyland) and Kent Green (Christmas Ballet: Stage Show)
- Phoebe the Farmyard Fairy: Susan Kirk (Farmyard Magic)
- Hattie and Sam's parents: Sue McCoy and Duncan Young (Farmyard Magic)
- Gardener - Wally Carr (2005)
- Bubbles the Beach Fairy: Alice Darling (2007)
- Twinkle the Tooth Fairy: Melody Lian (2007)
- Cordeline the Clever Pixie: Monique Anderson (2009)
- Rainbow the Birthday Fairy: Zoe Komazec (2009)
- Jethro the Jitterboy: Tom Greenfield (2009)

=== Child characters ===
- Fairy & Elf Tots: April Hancock, Lewis Rankin, Cameron Sherman, Harlan Spaven, Samantha Stokes and Abigail 'Abbie' Watts (The Fairies/Fairy Hello!, A Fairy Merry Christmas and Farmyard Magic)
- Molly the Gumtree Tot: Alana Grimaldi (Farmyard Magic)
- Hugo the Gumtree Tot: Michael Hayes (Farmyard Magic)
- Melody the Fairyland Tot: Stephanie Antonopoulos (2005)
- Jingles the Fairyland Tot: Erin Dunn (2005)
- Treble the Fairyland Tot: Sam Trenwith (2005)
- Lilly-Belle the Baby Fairyland Tot: Georgia Riley (Fairy Magic)
- Buttercup the Fairyland Tot: Tayla Dantu-Hann (2007)
- Acorn the Fairyland Tot: Matthew Wilson (2007)
- Arabella the Top of the Garden Child: Benita Grimaldi (The Fairies/Fairy Hello!, A Fairy Merry Christmas and Farmyard Magic), and then Sasha Champion (2005)
- William the Top of the Garden Child: James Mercuri (The Fairies/Fairy Hello!, A Fairy Merry Christmas and Farmyard Magic), and then Harrison Dearing (2005)
- Emily the Top of the Garden Child: Joanna Reppucci (The Fairies/Fairy Hello!, A Fairy Merry Christmas and Farmyard Magic)
- Hattie the Farm Child/Twin: Emily Rocco (Farmyard Magic)
- Sam the Farm Child/Twin: Benjamin Schapel (Farmyard Magic)
- Baby Harmony: Lucinda 'Lucy' Watts (2005)
- Baby Rhapsody: Jemma Highet (2005)
- Emma the Top of the Garden Child: Abigail 'Abbie' Watts (2005, 2007)
- Jack the Top of the Garden Child: Harrison 'Harry' Watts (2007)
- Lily the Top of the Garden Child: Elisabeth Wellings (2007)
- Flower Fairy Tot - Claudia Fallon (2007)
- Fairy Dancing Girls: Momo Hoshino and Lucinda 'Lucy' Watts (2009) (Note: Momo and Lucinda 'Lucy' are the two main ones that first appeared in Fairy Dancing Girl (2008). There are 13 other Fairy Dancing Girls with the two making 15 all together in the show's third series.)

== Videography ==
=== Home video releases ===
- The Fairies (1998) (Note: Originally released through Polygram in 1998, it was re-released through ABC for Kids in 2000) (Note: The Fairies and Farmyard Magic were also re-released onto a double DVD through ABC for Kids in 2004)
- A Fairy Merry Christmas (1998)
- Farmyard Magic (2000)
- Fairy Magic (2005)
- Fairy Dancing (2005)
- Fairy Beach (2007)
- Fairy Fun, Fun, Fun (2007)
- Fairy Dancing Girl (2008)
- Nursery Rhymes (2009)
- Christmas Carols in Fairyland (2009)
- Christmas Ballet: Stage Show (2011)

=== Episode Compilations ===
- The Fairy Ring (2005)
- The Fairyland Band (2005)
- Fairyland Songs: Volume 1 (2005)
- The Top of the Garden: 5 episodes from Series 2 (2007)
- Barnaby Takes The Lead: 5 episodes from the TV Series (2007)
- Wizzy's Wonky Magic (2007)
- Fairyland Songs: Volume 2 (2007)
- Fun To Learn: With Harmony, Rhapsody and their Fairyland friends! (2009)
- Fairytales (2009)
- Learn to Dance: With Fairy Princess Minuet and The Fairies (2009)
- Sing and Dance: Hit Songs from 2009 (2009)
- The Best of The Fairies: Volume 1 (2010)

== Discography ==
- The Fairies (1998)
- A Fairy Merry Christmas (1998)
- Farmyard Magic (2000)
- A Magical Fairy Party (2001)
- Fairy Magic (2005)
- Fairy Dancing (2005)
- Fairy Beach (2007)
- Fairy Fun, Fun, Fun (2007)
- Best Party Songs (2007)
- Nursery Rhymes (2009)
- Princess Perfect (2009)
- Lullabies (2009)
- Christmas Carols in Fairyland (2009)
- Favourites (2010)
- Christmas Ballet: Stage Show (2011)

== iTunes releases ==
=== Albums ===
- Fairy Magic (2016)
- Fairy Dancing (2016)
- Lullabies (2016)
- Fairy Fun, Fun, Fun! (2016)
- Fairy Beach (2016)
- Fairy Besties (2016)
- Princess Perfect (2016)
- Party Songs (2016)
- Nursery Rhymes (2016)
- Fairy Merry Christmas (2016) (Note: Features songs from Christmas Carols in Fairyland and Christmas Ballet: Stage Show)
- Vintage Fairies (2017) (Note: Features songs from The Fairies/Fairy Hello! and A Magical Fairy Party album)
- Vintage Farmyard (2017)

=== Movies ===
- Fairy Hello! (1998)
- Fairy Merry Christmas (1998)
- Fairy Magic (2005)
- Fairy Dancing (2005)
- Fairy Beach (2007)
- Dancing Girl (2008)
- Nursery Rhymes (2009)
- Christmas Carols (2009)

== Awards and nominations ==
=== ARIA Music Awards ===
Year	Nominated works	Award	Result	Ref
2006	Fairy Magic	Best Children's Album	Nominated	
2007	Fairy Beach	Best Children's Album	Nominated	
2008	Fairy Fun, Fun, Fun	Best Children's Album	Nominated	
2009	Princess Perfect	Best Children's Album	Nominated	

=== Helpmann Awards ===
Year	Nominated works	Award	Result	Ref
2007	The Fairies Live on Stage	Best Presentation for Children	Nominated	

== See also ==
- South Australian Film Corporation
- Fairy (disambiguation)
