= Princeton station (Minnesota) =

- Great Northern Depot
- U.S. National Register of Historic Places
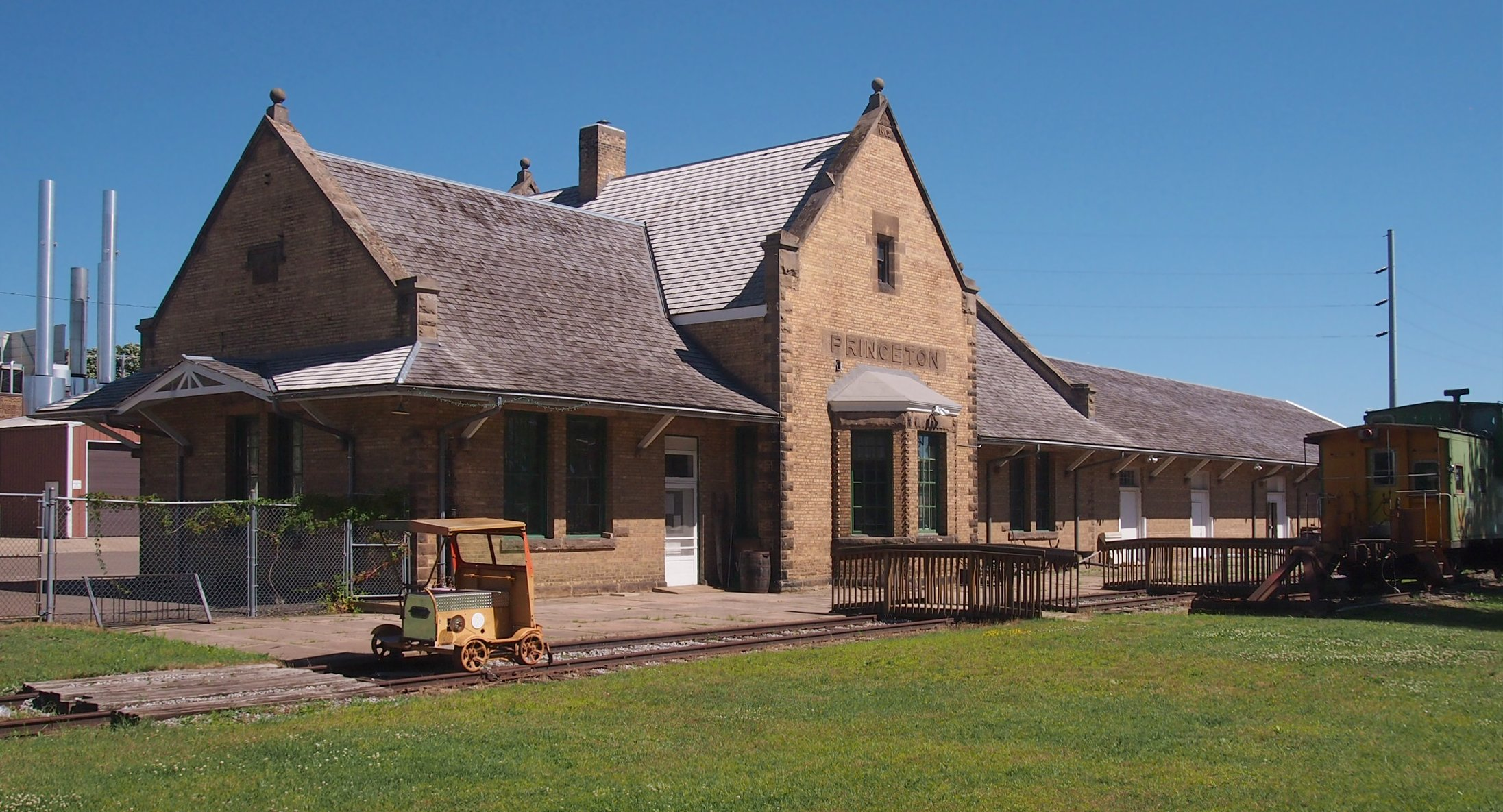
- The Princeton Depot from the northwest

- Location within Minnesota Location within the United States
- Location: 101 10th Ave S Princeton, Minnesota
- Coordinates: 45°34′9″N 93°35′17″W
- Architect: J. C. Patterson; Libby & Nelson
- Architectural style: Colonial, Queen Anne
- NRHP reference No.: 77000757
- Added to NRHP: November 23, 1977

Princeton station in Princeton, Minnesota, United States, is a former passenger and freight depot on the Great Northern Railway. The building is a combination of Queen Anne and Jacobean architectural styles, built of local brick with sandstone trim. It was listed on the National Register of Historic Places in 1977 as the Great Northern Depot.

== The Elk River-Milaca Line ==
The Great Northern Railway originally did not travel through Princeton, it ran from Minneapolis through Elk River and on to St. Cloud. Another line ran from St. Cloud through Milaca to Duluth. Great Northern mogul James J. Hill challenged local business owners to raise $50,000 to route the line through Princeton. The money was raised, and the Elk River-Milaca line was slated to be built.

Surveying for the route began in late March 1886, and the track-laying crew started building the new line from Elk River on October 24, 1886. With few obstacles to construction, the line was finished quickly, and rail service began on November 29, 1886. The new Princeton route actually shortened the distance between Minneapolis and Duluth.

Initially service was frequent, but in November 1899 the route to Duluth was relocated to a line passing further east, connecting through Coon Rapids, Cambridge and Brook Park (known as the Coon Creek Cutoff or the Bee Line). As a result, service on the Elk River-Milaca line went into a long, drawn-out decline, with luxury passenger cars being replaced with ordinary coaches in 1908, the U.S. Mail route being lost in 1930, and passenger service terminated altogether in 1952. Freight service continued until 1976, at which time the Elk River-Milaca line was abandoned.

== The New Depot ==
The Princeton depot was built in 1902 at a cost of $15,594, replacing a wooden-frame structure. The dedication ceremony was well-attended, with a crowd of at least 500 people. The size of the depot, at a length of 215 feet, a height of 35 feet, and a width exceeding 37 feet, made it the largest building in Princeton. The main products shipped from the depot were agricultural and forest commodities, along with a substantial amount of brick from a brickyard two miles north of Princeton.

The Preservation Alliance of Minnesota listed this depot on its 2010 list of the 10 Most Endangered Historic Places in Minnesota. The building has since received a grant from the Minnesota Historical Society and is being restored.

== Mille Lacs County Historical Society Depot Museum ==
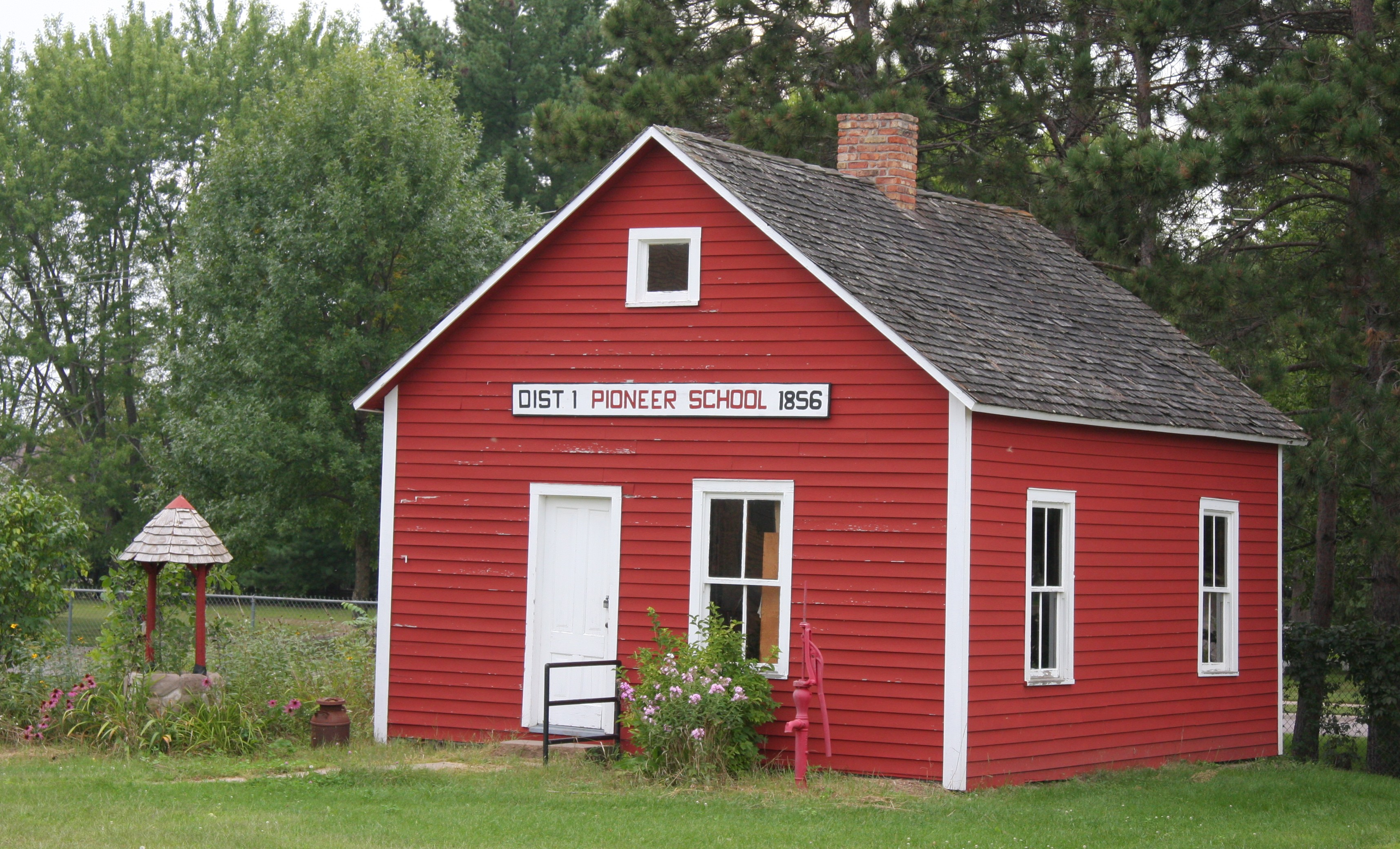
The pioneer schoolhouse at the museum in 2015

Today, the depot is the home of the Mille Lacs County Historical Society Depot Museum, with railroad cars and track placed next to the building. Railroad cars on-site include a 1963 Milwaukee Road insulated boxcar, a 1925 Wooden Milwaukee Road boxcar, a 1963 Burlington Northern wide-vision steel caboose, and a 1963 Great Northern flat car used for concerts in the summer. Also on site is the 1856 "District 1" one-room schoolhouse, which was the first school in Mille Lacs County.

== Three Sisters ==
The Princeton depot was one of three "sister" stations in the Great Northern system that had essentially the same design. One of her "sisters" was about 70 miles southwest of Princeton in Litchfield, Minnesota and the other one was about 1,700 miles to the west in Bellingham, Washington. Some of the materials and trim were different, but the design was almost identical. The other two "sisters" are long gone (the Bellingham depot burned in 1924, and Litchfield razed their depot in 1985). The Princeton Great Northern depot is the sole survivor.

Preceding station	Great Northern Railway	Following station
Long's Siding toward Milaca	Milaca – Minneapolis	Zimmerman toward Minneapolis
