= Judge Fay =

Judge Fay may refer to:

- Peter T. Fay (1929–2021), judge of the United States Court of Appeals for the Eleventh Circuit
- William M. Fay (1915–2000), judge of the United States Tax Court

== See also ==
- Justice Fay (disambiguation)
