= Fays =

Fays may refer to:

- places in France:
  - Fays, Haute-Marne, a commune in the Haute-Marne department
  - Fays, Vosges, a commune in the Vosges department
  - Fays-la-Chapelle, a commune in the Aube department
  - Les Deux-Fays, a commune in the Jura department
- places in Belgium
  - Fays, a hamlet in the commune Ciney
  - Fays, a hamlet in the commune Theux
- surname:
  - Raphaël Faÿs, a French guitarist

== See also ==
- Fay (disambiguation)
- Feys (surname)
