= La Faye =

- Commune
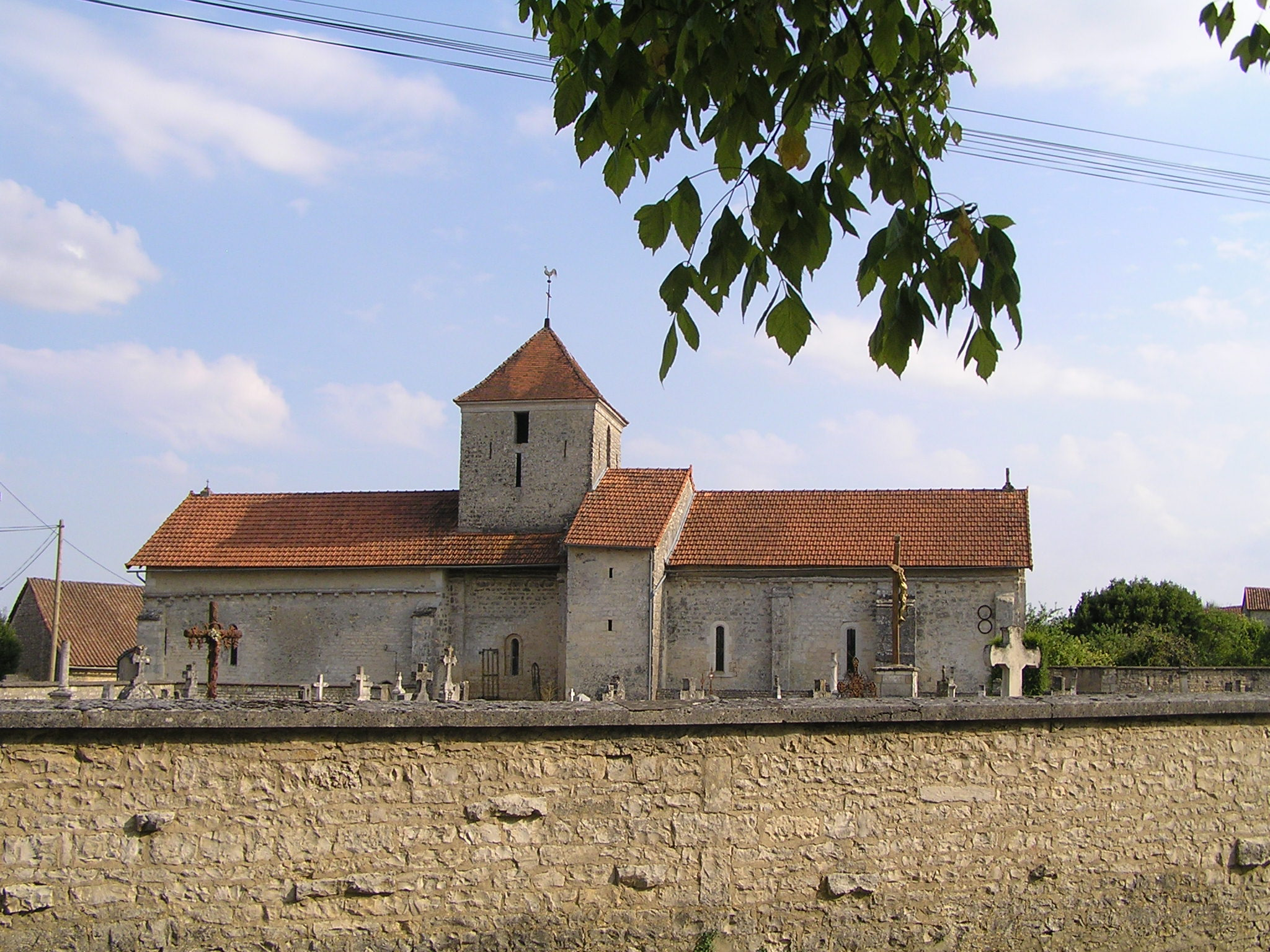
- The church in La Faye
- Location of La Faye
- Location within France Location within Nouvelle-Aquitaine
- Coordinates: 46°01′16″N 0°08′51″E
- Country: France
- Region: Nouvelle-Aquitaine
- Department: Charente
- Arrondissement: Confolens
- Canton: Charente-Nord
- Intercommunality: Val de Charente

Government
  - Mayor (2025–2026): Jean-Claude Thomas
- Area^{1}: 13.44 km^{2} (5.19 sq mi)
- Elevation: 134 m (440 ft)
- Highest elevation: 149 m (489 ft)
- Lowest elevation: 104 m (341 ft)
- Population (2023): 617
  - Density: 45.9/km^{2} (119/sq mi)
- Time zone: UTC+01:00 (CET)
  - Summer (DST): UTC+02:00 (CEST)
- INSEE/Postal code: 16136 /16700
- ^{1} French Land Register data, which excludes lakes, ponds, glaciers > 1 km^{2} (0.386 sq mi or 247 acres) and river estuaries.

La Faye is a commune in the Charente department in southwestern France.

== Population ==
Historical population
Year	Pop.	±% p.a.
1968	490	—
1975	547	+1.58%
1982	519	−0.75%
1990	539	+0.47%
1999	568	+0.58%
2007	600	+0.69%
2012	628	+0.92%
2017	596	−1.04%
2023	617	+0.58%
Source: INSEE

== See also ==
- Communes of the Charente department
