= Fay King =

Fay King may refer to:

- Fay King (American football) (1922–1983), American football player
- Fay King (cartoonist) (1889 – after 1954), American cartoonist
- Fay King Imhoff (1904–1989), American calligrapher
