= Fay Cravens =

American politician

Fay Cravens (November 11, 1872 – February 14, 1955) was an American politician and newspaper editor.

Cravens was born in Princeton, Minnesota and went to the Princeton public schools. He served in the Minnesota National Guard from 1915 to 1922 and with the Milaca Fire Department. He lived in Milaca, Minnesota with his wife and family. Cravens was the publisher of the Mille Lacs County Journal. Cravens served in the Minnesota House of Representatives in 1933 and 1934 and in the Minnesota Senate from 1935 to 1938. He died in Milaca, Minnesota.
