= Mike Fairey =

Michael Edward Fairey ( June 1948 - 20 November 2022 ) is the chairman of Hastings Insurance since June 2015. He was previously deputy chief executive of Lloyds TSB bank. He is the chairman of the trustees of the Lloyds TSB Pension Funds. He is non-executive chairman of OneSavings Bank plc, a position which he will leave in 2017.

In May 2017, he was appointed as non-executive director of Bibby Financial Services.
