= Fay Marvin Clark =

American real-estate developer, entrepreneur and politician

Fay Marvin Clark (born 1907, La Crosse, Wisconsin, died 1991) was a real-estate developer, entrepreneur and politician. He developed several plots of land in Hiawatha, Iowa, and became mayor of the town from 1950 to 1958, and again from 1961 to 1963. Clark was interested in spirituality and the paranormal, and reported many out of body experiences.
