= Fay, Missouri =

Unincorporated community in Missouri, U.S.

Coordinates: 36°33′19″N 92°20′37″W

Fay is an unincorporated community in southeastern Ozark County, in the Ozarks of south-central Missouri, United States. The community is located along Missouri Route J, approximately 2.5 miles south of U.S. Route 160. The Fay Cemetery lies just west of Route J and north of the Lick Creek - Sweeten Creek junction.

== History ==
A post office called Fay was established in 1892, and remained in operation until 1915. Besides the post office, the community had a school. The schoolhouse was named after the Fay family of settlers.
