= Fey =

Fey or FEY may refer to:

== Places ==
- Féy, Moselle, France
- Fey, Vaud, Switzerland

== People ==
- Fey (name), and persons with the name
- Fey (singer) (born 1973), vocalist

== Arts, entertainment, and media ==
=== Fictional entities ===
- Fey (Dungeons & Dragons), a fictional creature
- Fey, an alternative word for fairy or faerie
- The Fey clan, a fictional family in the Ace Attorney universe

=== Music ===
- Fey (album), a 1995 recording by the singer of the same name
- "Fèy", a traditional vodou folk song in Haiti

== Other uses ==
- Fey, an alternative spelling in English of the Hebrew letter fe

== See also ==
- Faye (disambiguation)
- Fay (disambiguation)
