= Faye Balla =

Senegalese footballer

Balla Faye
Personal information
- Full name: Balla Faye
- Date of birth: September 17, 1994 (age 32)
- Place of birth: Guediawaye, Senegal
- Height: 1.87 m (6 ft 2 in)
- Position: Defender

Team information
- Current team: Cortona Camucia

Youth career
- Spezia

Senior career*
Years	Team	Apps	(Gls)
2013–2014	Spezia	0	(0)
2014–2015	Olhanense	6	(0)
2015–2016	Fezzanese	7	(0)
2016–2017	Torres	13	(1)
2017–2018	Gallico Catona	5+	(3)
2018–2019	Nuorese	22	(0)
2019	Assisi Subasio	?	(?)
2019–	Cortona Camucia	1+	(1)
- * Club domestic league appearances and goals as of 18 October 2020

Balla Faye (born 17 September 1994) is a Senegalese footballer who plays for Cortona Camucia Calcio.
