= Fairyland (disambiguation) =

Fairyland is the land or home of the fairies.

Fairyland or Fairy Land may also refer to:

== Other uses ==
- Fairyland: A Kingdom of Fairies, a 1903 French short silent adventure film
- Fairyland bamboo (Phyllostachys aurea), a bamboo species
- Fairyland, a novel by science fiction writer Paul J. McAuley
- Fairyland (Gailit novel), a 1918 novel by August Gailit
- Fairyland (Elliott novel), a 1990 novel by Sumner Locke Elliott
- Fairyland (series), a 2011 novel series by Catherynne M. Valente
- Fairy-Land, an 1829 poem by Edgar Allan Poe
- Fairyland (horse), an Irish Thoroughbred racehorse
- Fairyland (film), a 2023 coming-of-age drama

== Places ==
=== Australia ===
- Fairyland, Queensland, a locality in the Western Downs Region
- Fairyland, Lane Cove River, a now disused leisure park located in bushland in North Ryde, Sydney, Australia

=== South Africa ===
- Fairyland, a suburb of the city of Paarl, South Africa

=== United States ===
- Children's Fairyland, a small children's amusement park in Oakland, California, and also the first theme park in the United States
- Fairyland Park, a Missouri amusement park operating from 1923 to 1977
- Fairyland Pond, Concord, Massachusetts

== Music ==
- Fairyland (band), a French power metal band
- Fairyland (album), an album by Larry Coryell
- "Fairyland" (song), a 2005 song by J-Pop singer Ayumi Hamasaki
- "Fairy Land", a 1969 song by Donnie Sutherland, one of the first stereo singles recorded in Australia

== See also ==
- Ferryland, Newfoundland and Labrador
- The Fairyland Story, a 1985 arcade game by Taito
