= Fairy Tale (Canadian TV series) =

2003 reality television series

- Genre: Reality television
- Created by: Myles Shane
- Country of origin: United States
- Original language: English
- No. of seasons: 2

Production
- Executive producers: Jonathan Hiltz; Naomi Hiltz
- Production company: Hiltz Squared Media Group

Original release
- Network: PrideVision
- Release: November 2, 2003

Fairy Tale is a Canadian LGBT dating television series.

Hosted by Nelson Tomé and produced by Canadian media company Hiltz Squared Media Group, with producer Eryn Billings, the program premiered on PrideVision in 2003, and aired for two seasons. One of the show's first contestants was comedian Trevor Boris, who was later also a writer for the series.
