= A Fairy Tale (ballet) =

1891 ballet by Marius Petipas

A Fairy Tale or A Magic Tale (French: Un Conte de fées), a ballet fantastique, was a ballet in one act choreographed by Marius Petipa to music by (?) Richter.

The ballet was first presented as an examination piece by students of the Imperial Ballet School on April 4/16 (Julian/Gregorian calendar dates), 1891, in the theatre of the Imperial Ballet School, St. Petersburg, Russia.

Anna Pavlova participated in this ballet when she was ten years old during her first year as a student at the Imperial Ballet School. It was the first ballet she ever danced in at the Mariinsky Theatre. (Her last performance at the Mariinsky would be as Nikiya in La Bayadère in 1914.)
