= Rhys Bobridge =

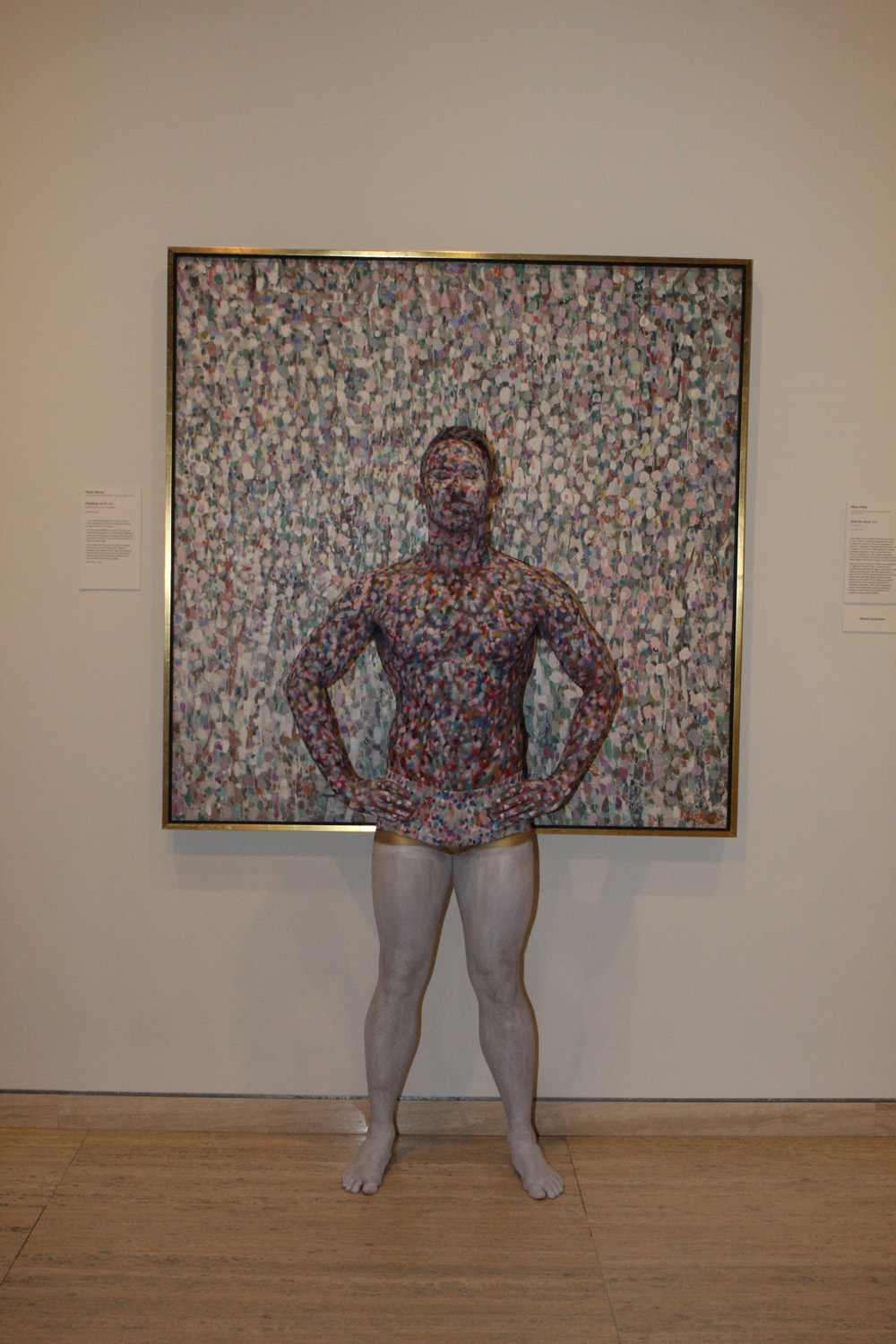
- Rhys Bobridge as living statue

Background information
- Also known as: Rhys
- Born: 24 December 1981 (age 44)
- Origin: Adelaide, Australia
- Genres: pop, dance
- Occupations: pop singer, dancer, make-up artist
- Instrument: vocals

Rhys Bobridge, also known as Rhys, is an Australian pop singer, dancer and make-up artist based in Sydney.

== Early life ==
Bobridge started gymnastics at seven years of age, which led him to attending classes at Johnny Young Talent School, alongside Australian Idol winner Wes Carr. In grade 10, Bobridge left Brighton Secondary School to attend Victorian College of the Arts, then went to work in a Taiwan theme park.

== Career ==
Bobridge appeared on the ABC TV and Seven Network's children's television program The Fairies as Elf from 2000 to 2007 and performed as a drag queen named "Regime Dettol".

He was runner up on Network 10's inaugural season of So You Think You Can Dance Australia in April 2008, and performed at the 18th Drag Industry Variety Awards (DIVAs) in August. On 24 November, after signing with Warner Music Australia, Bobridge released an altered cover version of the dance track "Hot Summer", originally performed by German pop band Monrose. "Hot Summer" was used on station promotions for Network Ten, and reached number 39 on the ARIA Top 50 Singles Chart.

Rhys has also taught dance at a number of organisations including the Sydney Dance Company studios.

== Discography ==
=== Singles ===
List of singles, with selected chart positions
| Title | Year | Peak chart positions | |
| Title | Year | AUS | NLD |
|---|---|---|---|
| "Hot Summer" | 2008 | 39 | 45 |
