= Justice Fay =

Justice Fay may refer to:

- David Fay (1761–1827), associate justice of the Vermont Supreme Court
- Jonas Fay (1737–1818), associate justice of the Vermont Supreme Court
- Thomas Fay (1940–2020), chief justice of the Rhode Island Supreme Court

== See also ==
- Judge Fay (disambiguation)
