= Fairy (steamboat) =

Steamship operated on Puget Sound

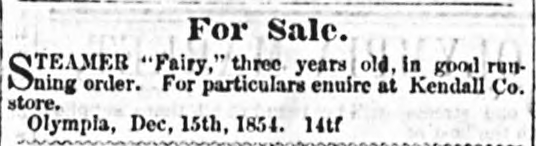
- Sale notice for Fairy

History
- Name: Fairy
- Route: Puget Sound
- In service: 1853

General characteristics
- Installed power: steam engine
- Propulsion: side wheels

Fairy was a small wooden sidewheel-driven steamship placed into service on Puget Sound in 1853. Fairy was the first steam-powered vessel to conduct regularly scheduled service on Puget Sound.

== Career ==
Fairy was built in San Francisco and brought to Puget Sound in November 1853 on the deck of the sailing ship Sarah Warren. The vessel was placed on the Olympia to Seattle run.
