= Faye (surname) =

Faye is a typical Serer surname.

People with the surname Faye include:

- Abdala Faye (born 1971), Senegalese mixed media artist
- Abdoulaye Faye (born 1978), Senegalese footballer
- Alice Faye, stage name of American actress and singer Alice Jeanne Leppert (1915–1998)
- Amdy Faye (born 1977), Senegalese footballer
- Andreas Faye (1802–1869), Norwegian priest, folklorist, and historian
- Bassirou Diomaye Faye (born 1980), Senegal's 5th President
- Fary Faye (born 1974), Senegalese retired footballer
- Fatou Lamin Faye (born 1954), Gambian politician
- Frances Faye (1912–1991), American singer and pianist
- Gaël Faye (born 1982), Rwandan-French singer and writer
- Gaynor Faye (born 1971), English actress and writer
- Guillaume Faye (1949–2019), French journalist and writer
- H. P. Faye (1859–1928), Norwegian-born businessman in the Kingdom of Hawaii
- Hervé Faye (1814–1902) French astronomer
- Ibou Faye (1969–2025), Senegalese hurdler
- Ibrahima Faye (born 1979), Senegalese footballer
- Jean-Pierre Faye (1925–2026), French philosopher and writer of fiction and prose poetry
- Jørgen Breder Faye (1823–1908), Norwegian banker and politician
- Julia Faye (1892–1966), American actress
- Lassana Faye (born 1998), Dutch footballer
- Mouhammad Faye (born 1985), Senegalese basketball player
- Pape Omar Faye (born 1987), Senegalese footballer
- Randall Faye (1892–1948), American screenwriter, film producer and director
- Safi Faye (1943–2023), Senegalese film director
- Sheikh Faye (1948–2013), Gambian high and long jumper
- Sheikh Omar Faye (born 1960), Gambian diplomat, former government minister and former athlete

== See also ==
- Faye family
- Fay (surname)
- Faye (disambiguation)
