= Tooth Fairy (disambiguation) =

The Tooth fairy is a mythical creature who gives out money in exchange for teeth.

Tooth Fairy may also refer to:

== Fictional entities ==
- The Tooth Fairy, alias of Francis Dolarhyde, a fictional serial killer in Thomas Harris' novel Red Dragon
- Tooth Fairy, a character from Rise of the Guardians
- Tooth Fairy, a character from The Fairly OddParents

== Films ==
- Tooth Fairy (2001), a short film which inspired Darkness Falls
- Tooth Fairy (2004 film), a 2004 short film
- Tooth Fairy (2010 film), a 2010 comedy film
  - Tooth Fairy 2, a direct-to-video 2012 sequel to the Tooth Fairy 2010 film
- The Tooth Fairy (film), a 2006 horror film starring Lochlyn Munro
- Tooth Pari: When Love Bites, an Indian horror comedy series

== Literature ==
- The Tooth Fairy (novel), a 1996 novel by Graham Joyce

== Television ==
Programs

- Tooth Fairy, Where Are You?, a 25-minute, made-for-TV animated short
- Tales of the Tooth Fairies

Episodes

- "Tooth Fairy" (Shaun the Sheep), an episode of Shaun the Sheep
- "The Tooth Fairy Tats 2000", an episode of South Park
