= Matthias Feys =

Belgian footballer

Personal information
- Full name: Matthias Feys
- Date of birth: 22 May 1985 (age 41)
- Place of birth: Bruges, Belgium
- Position: Defensive midfielder

Team information
- Current team: Ruddervoorde
- Number: 11

Youth career
- Cercle Brugge

Senior career*
Years	Team	Apps	(Gls)
2004–2007	Cercle Brugge	13	(0)
2007–2009	RC Waregem		
2009–2011	KVW Zaventem	58	(12)
2011–2014	Deinze	84	(16)
2014–2015	Izegem	32	(3)
2015–2017	Westhoek	3	(0)
2017–2022	Blankenberge		
2022–2023	Diksmuide	32	(2)
2023–	Ruddervoorde	29	(19)
- * Club domestic league appearances and goals as of 15:02, 23 June 2024 (UTC)

Matthias Feys (born 22 May 1985 in Bruges) is a Belgian footballer. He usually plays as defensive midfielder for KDC Ruddervoorde.

== Career ==
Like Frederik Boi, Bram Vandenbussche and Jan Masureel, Feys was a typical youth product of Cercle Brugge: he never played for any other team before achieving a place in the senior squad. Though on 30 June 2007, his contract expired and wasn't renewed. He was signed in the beginning of July 2007 by RC Waregem.
