= Faye S. Taxman =

- Born: January 1, 1955 (age 71)
- Education: University of Tulsa; Rutgers University
- Known for: Systems-of-care models, RNR Simulation Tool, community corrections reform
- Awards: Fellow of the American Society of Criminology (2018); ASC August Vollmer Award (2023)
- Scientific career
- Fields: Criminology, health services, behavioral health, corrections
- Workplaces: George Mason University; Virginia Commonwealth University; University of Maryland, College Park

Faye S. Taxman (born 1955) is an American scholar who is a University Professor at George Mason University (2008–present) in Fairfax, Virginia, United States and the Founding Director of the Center for Advancing Correctional Excellence (ACE!) at George Mason University. Her work is widely known for its influence on the redesign of aspects of the behavioral corrections system, specifically pertaining to the reduction of recidivism and mechanisms to achieve this such as offender rehabilitation, as showcased in her books Tools of the Trade: A Guide to Incorporating Science into Practice (National Institute of Justice, 2004) and Implementing Evidence-Based Practices in Community Corrections and Addiction Treatment (Springer, 2012). She has also been an Affiliate Professor with the College of Medicine at Howard University (Washington, D.C.) since 2012 and with Griffith University in Brisbane, Australia since 2013.

== Educational background ==
Taxman's interest in criminal justice can be seen throughout her studies. In 1977, Taxman graduated from the University of Tulsa with a Bachelor of Arts (with honors). Shortly after, she continued her studies at Rutgers University, graduating with her Ph.D. in criminal justice in 1982.

== Career ==
Taxman commenced work in 1977 as a research analyst for the Police Foundation, a non-profit organization "dedicated to advancing policing through innovation and independent scientific research." She continued work in criminology as she transitioned into a research assistantship at Rutgers University (1978–1981) and instructor at Rutgers (1980–1981) during her graduate studies.

Following her Ph.D., she continued to work in criminal justice at Applied Management Sciences before taking on the role as deputy director of the Criminal Justice Coordinating Commission (CJCC) in Montgomery County, Maryland in 1988. In this role, she monitored the administration of justice and the standard of law enforcement within the Montgomery County, taking over as acting director in 1992. While there, she also began work at the Institute for Law and Justice to work as a Principal Associate (1991–1994) and began work at the University of Maryland, College Park, eventually being hired as a full-time, tenure track faculty member (1994–2004) and Director of the Bureau of Governmental Research (BGR) there. She later took a second academic position at Virginia Commonwealth University, at the rank of Full Professor, and finally moved to George Mason University, appointed as a Full Professor and eventually being awarded the title of University Professor in 2009. There, she and Dr. Danielle Rudes founded the Center for Advancing Correctional Excellence (ACE!) in 2010. Today, she continues to direct ACE! and co-directs the Global Community Corrections Initiative with James Byrne (University of Massachusetts, Lowell).

== Research ==
Taxman has published more than 220 articles and several books. A few of her most well-known are described here.

=== Tools of the Trade: A Guide to Incorporating Science into Practice ===
One of Taxman's most prominent publications is Tools of the Trade: A Guide to Incorporating Science into Practice, which was published by the National Institute of Corrections in 2004. The guide outlines the factors that contribute to criminal behavior and the mechanisms that correctional facilities/programs can employ to prevent offender recidivism, which include attitude corrections, effective communication, obtaining information, using incentives, and categorizing individuals correctly.

==== Attitude corrections ====
The publication advises offender correction facilities employ various techniques to redress criminal behavior. Such techniques shall be evidenced through the actions of employees to accomplish the goals of the organization and decrease the prominence of criminal-related issues. This section defines behavioral management as a construct affected by a number of factors: society, corrections, psychology and law. The chapter details a humanistic approach towards offenders, so as not to ostracise criminals and treat them as incapable of making meaningful contributions to society. In this, offenders must take an active role in the construction of their rehabilitation guidelines.

==== Mechanisms for effective communication ====
According to Tools of the Trade, positive outcomes are more likely to arise when the offender is persuaded. As such, the examination process places strong emphasis on employee skills, specifically, communication and obtaining information relevant to the proper examination of offenders. Such information is then processed and used to construct “supervision plans” and “behavioral contracts”. In this, offenders receive constant feedback and have an obligation to improve their behavior. This translates the goal of the offender rehabilitation and reduction of criminal recidivism into an actionable and measurable plan. Such an approach requires open and effective communication between employees and offenders at all times so as to provide the opportunity for individuals to adopt the appropriate skillset to recognise and redress behavioral deficiencies.

Within the correctional facilities workplace environment, this process is more formally referred to as “staff-offender contacts”. It is paramount such communications are unambiguous so as to streamline the achievement of mutual offender and employee goals. The interview-style discussion adheres to a semi-structure of: introduction, middle and summary. In this, the conversation remains primarily goal-orientated while maintaining adaptability to employee methods.

==== Mechanisms to obtain information ====
In the attitude correction process, employees collate information concerning offenders under their guidance. Such information is sourced widely from “staff-offender contacts”, mandatory testing for illicit substances, polygraph test results and various monitoring systems such as electronic surveillance, Global Positioning Satellite systems and fingerprinting or biometric scanning. The advantage of such a wide source of information means employees almost always reserve the ability to pin point the location of offenders. Present day, the movement towards “community supervision” has taken the place of “office-based supervision”. This is based on indications interviews in the workplace environment neglect to provide employees with sufficient information required for the adequate supervision of criminals, specifically pertaining to high-risk offenders. In person meetings occur routinely, generally restricted to monthly or weekly sittings, therefore non optimal to the collation of offenders’ progress.

This constant monitoring enables behavioral correction employees to maintain a watchful-eye on the offender's reintegration into society and monitor whether or not the individual is acting in line with “supervision plans” and “behavioral contracts”. This allows staff to identify prominent members of offender's lives and foster appropriate employee-offender rapport. By extension of this, employees develop rapport with local home and business-owners who maintain the ability to a) offer information relevant to offenders and b) may be able to facilitate and support the offenders’ positive change. In this, both the community and technological surveillance as per the offenders’ risk level enables employees to adapt accordingly to counteract the recurrence of criminal behavior.

==== How to incentivize offenders ====
Given the extensive use of resources, information concerning noncompliance with conditions of parole, probation or rehabilitation is readily available for employees. By nature of the “behavior management model”, there are specific sanctions or rewards in place for both violations and compliant actions. Sanctions and rewards serve as mechanisms to ensure offenders act in line with behavioral contracts. This form of incentivisation occurs across a spectrum that progressively limits offenders’ freedoms, placing restrictions based upon their respective lifestyle. Such limitations can manifest in the form of increased staff-offender contact and short- or long-term imprisonment. Noncompliance are offset by heavier impositions and phases of compliance are rewarded by a decrease in restrictions on daily activities. In facilitating positive progression, offenders are made aware of the actions that warrant rewards and sanctions.

==== Categories of criminals ====
The degree to which offenders are supervised upon re-entering society is dependent upon their level of risk. Given this, criminals are classed according to the nature of their offence: aggressive and sex offenders, dealings in or use of illicit substances, white collar criminals and first-time offenders. However, all offenders must be supervised with respect to individual examination, communication, information and incentives. Proper examination method requires offenders be identified at the commencement of case planning. This ensures the correct guidelines are implemented based on the profile and description of the offender.

=== Implementing Evidence-Based Practices in Community Corrections and Addiction Treatment ===
Of her most recognised published works, Implementing Evidence-Based Practices in Community Corrections and Addiction Treatment (Springer, 2011), is part of the Springer Series on Evidence-Based Crime Policy (SSEBCP). This text offers a platform for evidence-based programs to be reintroduced and reapplied for the more adequate provision of justice in the real-world context. It outlines mechanisms for positive offender rehabilitation based on extensive research into internal factors within the organization, for example, faculty development and management buy-in and external factors, including stakeholder commitment and the allocation of resources and funding. This framework creates an actionable and measurable framework to ensure the implementation of evidence-based strategy in operational agencies.

According to Taxman and co-author Steven Belenko, factors influencing the effectiveness of outcomes pertaining to the behavioral corrections system are as follows:

1. Adaptability on the part of the broader community. This section of the book is mostly concerned with the skills and resources of officers whom are entrusted to enforce the law within behavioral corrections facilities. This section questions the ability of officers to adopt various innovative structural frameworks based on readiness to adapt, learning capabilities and the goal-orientation of the organization. Members of staff are required to be trained to a level deemed sufficient by the entity to ensure measurable achievement of organizational goals. This questions not only staff ability but overall success, insofar as the ability of the organization to both train and retain employees as well as the commitment of staff to manifesting the vision of the organization.
2. The next section enquires into the progress of the organization and how on track it is to achieve the intended outcome of the change. Here, Taxman and her co-writers link organizational success to commitment to its goals. Based on studies undergone to construct the text, it is concluded the overall ineffectiveness of goal implementation when the organization demonstrated a lack of commitment to the integration of such innovations. Thus, organizational commitment to its vision and values is a mechanism to improve overall success. The process by which such outcomes are measured can be seen through a decline in offender recidivism and substance abuse.
3. Taxman and Belenko outline the mechanisms employed by an organization to ensure the effective implementation of its goals and visions to innovate, counteract issues and engage in problem-solving behavior. This is an ongoing methodology adopted for the overall enhancement of behavioral corrections systems. The process involves the monitoring of complaints on behalf of both officer and offenders and investigation into such complaints. Records must also be kept as issues arise as a means of measuring achievement goals. In addition, the organization must prioritise issues based on merit and the overall level of their disruption to the organizations a) day-to-day life and culture and; b) goals and vision.

== Awards and honors ==
Taxman has received numerous prestigious awards, including:

- Vollmer Award from the American Society of Criminology (2023)
- Outstanding Scholarship Award from the Schar School of Policy and Government (2023)
- Mission Award from the Society for Implementation Research Collaboration (SIRC) (2022), the inaugural award, with faculty from Michigan State and the University of Central Florida
- Lifetime Achievement Award from the American Society of Criminology's Division of Sentencing and Corrections (2019)
- Fellow of the American Society of Criminology (2018)
- Joan McCord Award from the Academy of Experimental Criminology/Division of Experimental Criminology (2017)
- Caron Foundation Award for Research (2015)
- Ted Palmer and Rita Warren Differential Intervention Award from the American Society of Criminology (2013)
- Distinguished Scholar Award from the American Society of Criminology's Division on Sentencing and Corrections (2013)
- Best Research Abstract Award from the Association for Medical Education and Research in Substance Abuse (2011), for work on collaborative behavioral management to reduce drug-related crimes and substance abuse
- Distinguished Scholar Award from the American Society of Criminology's Division on Sentencing and Corrections (2008)
- University of Cincinnati Award from the American Probation and Parole Association (2002)

She has also been acknowledged among the most productive criminology scholars on several occasions, including in the Journal of Criminal Justice Education among all criminologists and as a standout among female scholars published in elite criminology journals. Her grant acquisition was also recognized among the most successful in the field in 2009.
