= Fey (name) =

Fey is a German or Irish name found as both a given name and surname.

== Persons ==
=== Surname ===
- Barry Fey (1930–2013), American rock concert promoter
- Tina Fey or Elizabeth Stamatina "Tina" Fey (born 1970), American writer, comedian and actress
- Queen Goodfey, a supporting character the 2017 TV show Mysticons in which her eldest daughter Arkayna Goodfey was chosen as the new Dragon Mage.
- William Fey (1942-2021), American-Papua New Guinea Roman Catholic bishop

=== Given name ===
- Fey (singer) (born María Fernanda Blásquez Gil in 1973), Latin Grammy Award-nominated Mexican pop artist

== Fictional characters ==
- Fey Truscott-Sade, also known as Fey or Feyde, a fictional character who appeared in the Doctor Who Magazine comic strip
- Fey Sommers, a character in the television show Ugly Betty
- The Fey Family from the Ace Attorney series
