= Viire Valdma =

Estonian actress

- Born: 29 August 1960 (age 65); Paldiski, then part of Estonian SSR, Soviet Union
- Occupation: Actress
- Years active: 1975–present
- Spouse: Toomas Urb (m. 1982; div. 1987)
- Children: Maria Urb (born 1983); Tom-Olaf Urb (born 1985)
- Awards: Order of the White Star, IV Class

Viire Valdma (born 29 August 1960) is an Estonian stage, television and film actress.

== Early life and education ==
Viire Valdma was born in the port town of Paldiski in Harju County. She has two sisters and a half-sister from her mother's second marriage after her parents divorced. The family was forced to move when Paldiski became a heavily fortified closed city after a Soviet Navy nuclear submarine training centre was constructed in 1962.

Valdma is a 1982 graduate of the Tallinn State Conservatory (now, the Estonian Academy of Music and Theatre) in Tallinn, having studied acting under instructor Aarne Üksküla. Among her graduating classmates were Anu Lamp, Margus Oopkaup, Jaan Rekkor, Laine Mägi, Sulev Teppart, and Andrus Vaarik.

== Stage career ==
In 1982, shortly after graduation, Viire Valdma began an engagement at the Vanalinnastuudio (Old Town Studio theatre) in Tallinn. She would remain with at the Vanalinnastuudio until 1996. She made her debut at the theatre in role of Alvetina Ivanova in a production of the Semyon Zlotnikov play A Man Came To A Woman in 1982. During her years at the Vanalinnastuudio she would appear in roles in productions of works by such authors and playwrights as: Shakespeare, Eduardo De Filippo, Oskar Luts, August Strindberg, Joseph Kesselring, Jean Genet, Félicien Marceau, Achille Campanile, Sławomir Mrożek, Johnnie Mortimer and Brian Cooke, Willy Russell, Neil Simon, George Gershwin, Ray Cooney, and Marc Camoletti, among others.

In 1996, Valdma joined the Eesti Draamateater (Estonian Drama Theatre) in Tallinn, where she is still currently engaged. During her years on the stage at the Eesti Draamateater, she has appeared in notable productions of works by such international authors and playwrights as: Shakespeare, Ibsen, Beckett, Feydeau, Corneille, Turgenev, Caryl Churchill, David Henry Hwang, Terry Pratchett, Alan Bennett, Evgeny Schwartz, Roland Schimmelpfennig, Peter Shaffer, Antti Tuuri, Juan Rulfo, and Jane Bowles, among many others. Roles in productions of Estonian playwrights and authors at the theatre include works by: Oscar Luts, Andrus Kivirähk, Paul-Eerik Rummo, Kristel Leesmend, Uku Uusberg, Egon Rannet, Mati Unt, Ervin Õunapuu, and Madis Kõiv.

== Television career ==
In 1975, at age 15, Viire Valdma made her first appearance on Estonian television in a small part in the Sulev Nõmmik-directed family-adventure film Mishuk. In 1982, she had a starring role as Lea in the Eesti Televisioon historical drama Musta katuse all based in the 1959 novel Lea by Juhan Smuul. In 1983, Valdma appeared as the character Leesi Tulp in the Ago-Endrik Kerge-directed satirical comedy television film Püha Susanna ehk meistrite kool, starring Ita Ever and Tiit Lilleorg, for Eesti Telefilm. The film was loosely based on a play by writer Enn Vetemaa with the same title. This was followed by a small role as a theatre director in the 2005 Rainer Sarnet-directed television comedy film Libahundi needus.

She has also appeared in a number of Estonian television series; most notably as Comrade Vokk in the 2011–2012 comedy series ENSV: Eesti Nõukogude Sotsialistlik Vabariik, which humorously chronicles life in the Estonian Soviet Socialist Republic in the early 1980s. In 2012, she played the role of Kaire Saar on the Kanal 2 series Saare Sosinad. She has also made appearances on the TV3 crime-comedy Kättemaksukontor in 2012 and the Kanal 2 crime drama Viimane võmm in 2014.

Valdma is possibly best known on television for her role as Tiina Püvi on the long-running ETV drama series Õnne 13; a role which she played from 2010 to 2016.

In 2016, she was cast in the title role of Doktor Silva in the TV3 medical comedy series penned by Martin Algus and Ergo Kuld which takes place in a fictional health care centre in the small village of Järva-Jaani in Järva County.

== Film career ==
In 1981, Vire Valdma made her feature film debut as Reet Pärn in the Peeter Simm directed drama Ideaalmaastik. The film was based on a novel by Karl Helemäe in which a member of the Young Communist League arrives at a collective farm and has to decide whether to follow the wisdom of the villagers, or the orders of Communist party authorities. This was followed by the role of Milla in the 1983 Kaljo Kiisk directed Nipernaadi for Tallinnfilm; the film was an adaptation of August Gailit's 1928 influential novel Toomas Nipernaadi.

In 1989, she had a small role in the Leia Laius directed drama Varastatud kohtumine, about a mother who was released from a Soviet prison camp and tries to reconcile with her son. The same year, she appeared in the Mikk Mikiver directed drama Doktor Stockmann. In 1990, she appeared as the character Liivi in the Aimée Beekman and Vladimir Beekman penned, Kaljo Kiisk directed drama Regina. Following her appearance in Regina, Valdma would concentrate on her stage career and not appear in another film until a small role in 2002's Marko Raat directed political thriller Agent Sinikael, starring Mait Malmsten and Kersti Heinloo.

In 2003, she appeared in the role of Imbi in the Rando Pettai directed, Peep Pedmanson penned comedy Vanad ja kobedad saavad jalad alla (English release title: Made in Estonia). The film was based on the popular Estonian radio-serial and television comedy series Vanad ja kobedad.

In 2007, she returned to film as Liina in the Andres Maimik and Rain Tolk directed road movie comedy Jan Uuspõld läheb Tartusse; a film that portrays Estonian actor Jan Uuspõld as a down-on-his-luck caricature of himself trying to hitchhike from Tallinn to Tartu to perform in a role at the Vanemuine theatre. That same year she played the role of Kärt in the Rainer Sarnet directed drama Kuhu põgenevad hinged, starring Ragne Veensalu. The film was produced by Exitfilm and based on the novel Mis sinuga juhtus, Ann? by Aidi Vallik about a troubled teenage girl whose brother is born with a heart defect. In 2018, she appeared as Imbi, the mother of a young woman who abandons her infant in the Liina Triškina-Vanhatalo-directed Allfilm drama Võta või jäta.

Valdma has also appeared in a number of film shorts and student films.

== Personal life ==
Viire Valdma married to actor and singer Toomas Urb in 1982. The couple had two children: daughter Maria Urb, born in 1983, and son Tom-Olaf Urb, born in 1985. Valdma and Urb divorced in 1987. Tom-Olaf Urb would become a musician and actor. Valdma's former nephew and her children's first cousin is actor Johann Urb.

Valdma currently resides in Tallinn and has been in a long-term relationship with former swimming champion and water polo player Olav Lukin for many years.
