= Margus Oopkaup =

Estonian actor and playwright (1959–2025)

- Born: 11 March 1959; Kuressaare, Saare County, then part of Estonian SSR, Soviet Union
- Died: 6 January 2025 (aged 65)
- Occupations: Actor; playwright
- Years active: 1980–2025

Margus Oopkaup (11 March 1959 – 6 January 2025) was an Estonian stage, film and television actor and playwright who was engaged at the Endla Theatre from 1982 to 2000. In 1983, he was awarded the Best Young Actor award for his performance in the film Nipernaadi.

== Early life and education ==
Margus Oopkaup was born in Kuressaare on the island of Saaremaa, on 11 March 1959. His father was a school teacher and his mother was a medical professional. He graduated from secondary school in Kuressaare in 1977 and studied at the Tallinn State Conservatory (now, the Estonian Academy of Music and Theatre) from 1978 until 1982 under instruction from Aarne Üksküla. Among his graduating classmates were Anu Lamp, Jaan Rekkor, Laine Mägi, Sulev Teppart, Andrus Vaarik, and Viire Valdma. He also studied psychology at the University of Tartu from 1985 until 1989.

== Acting career ==
Shortly after graduating from the Tallinn State Conservatory in 1982, Oopkaup was engaged at the Endla Theatre. There, he appeared in numerous stage productions until his departure in 2000. Among his more memorable roles in theater were in works by: Leo Tolstoy, A. H. Tammsaare, Aleksis Kivi, Mika Waltari, August Strindberg, August Kitzberg, Ödön von Horvath, Gerhart Hauptmann, Sławomir Mrożek, Ivan Turgenev, Franz Pocci and Brian Friel.

In 1981 he made his screen debut in the Mark-Toomas Soosaar directed Tallinnfilm drama Jõulud Vigalas (Christmas in Vigala) as Anton Kolumbus. This was followed by the role of Päärn Anders in the 1981 Arvo Kruusement directed film adaptation of the 1938 August Gailit novel Karge meri, which chronicles the lives of seal hunters living on the coast of the Baltic Sea. In 1983, Oopkaup appeared in the role of Joonatan in the Kaljo Kiisk directed film Nipernaadi (English release tite: The Adventurer), based on the 1928 novel Toomas Nipernaadi by Estonian writer August Gailit. For his role in the film, Oopkaup was given the Best Young Actor award for 1983. In 1991, he appeared as the title character Otto Almar in the Ingo Normet directed television film Otto Almari nägemus, based on the 1907 story Uurimisel, by A. H. Tammsaare.

In 2004, Margus Oopkaup (with Raivo Kuusk) penned his first book: Mõtle endasse. The following year he penned the children's Christmas play Jõuluvana kodu jõulud, published by Tänapäev.

== Illness and career decline ==
In 2000, Oopkaup was fired from the Endla Theatre after eighteen years. Following his departure, Oopkaup's mental and physical health began to decline. He was diagnosed with crippling rheumatoid arthritis in his legs and suffered from severe bouts of depression for which he had to be hospitalised. As his health declined, he worked a series of odd-jobs, including work as an undertaker, a shop salesperson and a security guard, among others. In 2005, he began working at the Pärnu rehabilitation center for people with special needs and the Pärnu Hospital of Psychiatry Day Centre as a drama instructor.

On 22 January 2015, Estonian weekly newspaper Maaleht interviewed Oopkaup, where he revealed that he was nearly destitute and surviving on € 227 euros a month; only allotting himself three euros a day for meals.

== Career revitalization ==
The response by the Estonian public to the news of Oopkaup's health and career downturn brought numerous offers of work for the actor. During a follow-up interview with Maaleht on 31 December 2015, Oopkaup revealed he was offered and accepted stage work as Klaus, a character from Lotte from Gadgetville at Lottemaa; a Lotte from Gadgetville theme park in Häädemeeste Parish; accepted an offer to become the Pärnu Association of the Blind's drama instructor and was hired to become the director of the Raeküla Rahva Theater in Pärnu.

In 2015, Oopkaup also returned to television in several episodes of the TV3 series Kättemaksukontor as the character of Magnus. Also in 2015 a play, Heldur ja Naised (Fantaasia publishing) and Iseendale (Hea Tegu publishing), a collection of poetry, were published.

Oopkaup died on 6 January 2025, at the age of 65.

== Acknowledgements ==
- Order of the White Star, V Class (2019)
- Estonian Red Cross Badge of Merit, V Class (2019)
