= Ülle Kaljuste =

Estonian actress (born 1957)

- Born: Ülle Side; 10 April 1957 (age 69); Tallinn, then part of Estonian SSR, Soviet Union
- Occupation: Actress
- Years active: 1980–present
- Spouse: Tõnu Kaljuste (divorced)
- Awards

Ülle Kaljuste (born Ülle Side; 10 April 1957) is an Estonian stage, film, television and radio actress.

== Early life ==
Born Ülle Side in Tallinn, she attended Tallinn Secondary School No. 2 (Estonian: Tallinn Reaalkool), graduating in 1975. Afterward, she attended the Tallinn State Conservatory of Performing Arts Department (now, the Estonian Academy of Music and Theatre), under the instruction of Merle Karusoo and graduating in 1980. Graduating classmates included actors Roman Baskin, Guido Kangur, Arvo Kukumägi, Ain Lutsepp, Anne Veesaar, and Paul Poom.

== Stage career ==
Shortly after graduation, she began an engagement at the Vanalinnastuudio which lasted from 1980 until 1989. Since 1998, she has been a performer at the Estonian Drama Theatre in Tallinn. Among her more memorable international roles in theatre were in works by: William Shakespeare, Eugene O'Neill, Edward Albee, Henrik Ibsen, Bertolt Brecht, Anton Chekhov, Neil Simon, Tennessee Williams and Tom Stoppard, among many others. Roles Estonian playwrights and authors include works by: Andrus Kivirähk, Paul-Eerik Rummo, Jaan Kross, Madis Kõiv and Hendrik Toompere.

== Film and television ==
Ülle Kaljuste made her film debut in the 1981 Estonian television movie Onu Tik-Taki seiklused, directed by Virve Koppel. In 1985, she made her screen debut in the 1985 musical comedy Savoy Ball, directed by Ago-Endrik Kerge. In 1992 Kaljuste was cast in the role of Emma in the Mati Põldre-directed biographical drama Need vanad armastuskirjad which explored the life of Raimond Valgre, an Estonian composer of the 1930s and the 1940s. In 1990, she played the title role in the Aimée Beekman and Vladimir Beekman penned and Kaljo Kiisk directed feature film drama Regina for Tallinnfilm. She would go one to appear in numerous films and television series. From 2006 until 2009 she appeared on the Kanal 2 television series Kelgukoerad as the character Signe.

== Personal life ==
In 1980, she married conductor Tõnu Kaljuste; the couple later divorced. She currently resides in Tallinn and Laulasmaa.

== Awards ==
- 1986 annual award of the Estonian Theatre Association
- 1996 Best Actress Award of 1993 (Hedda Gabler)
- 1996 Best Supporting Actress for Estonian Film Week, Pärnu (Noorelt õpitud and Need vanad armastuskirjad)
- 2000 Little Ants, Estonian Drama Theatre Prize
- 2001 2001 Drama Festival (role of Judith, Aristocrats)
- 2002 Big Ants, Estonian Drama Theatre Prize
- 2005 Big Ants, Estonian Drama Theatre Prize
- 2006 Estonian Theatre Award
- 2008 Big Ants, Estonian Drama Theatre Prize
- 2009 Radio Theatre Actor Award
- 2011 Order of the White Star, IV Class
- 2011 Little Ants, Estonian Drama Theatre Prize

== Selected filmography ==
- Äratus (Awakening, 1989)
- Need vanad armastuskirjad (Those Old Love Letters, 1992)
- Vana daami visiit (The Visit of the Old Lady, 2006)
- Ruudi (2006)
- Idioot (The Idiot, 2011)
- Surnuaiavahi tütar (Graveyard Keeper's Daughter, 2011)
- Goodbye Soviet Union (2020)
- Our Erika (2026)
