= Salme Reek =

Estonian actress (1907–1996)

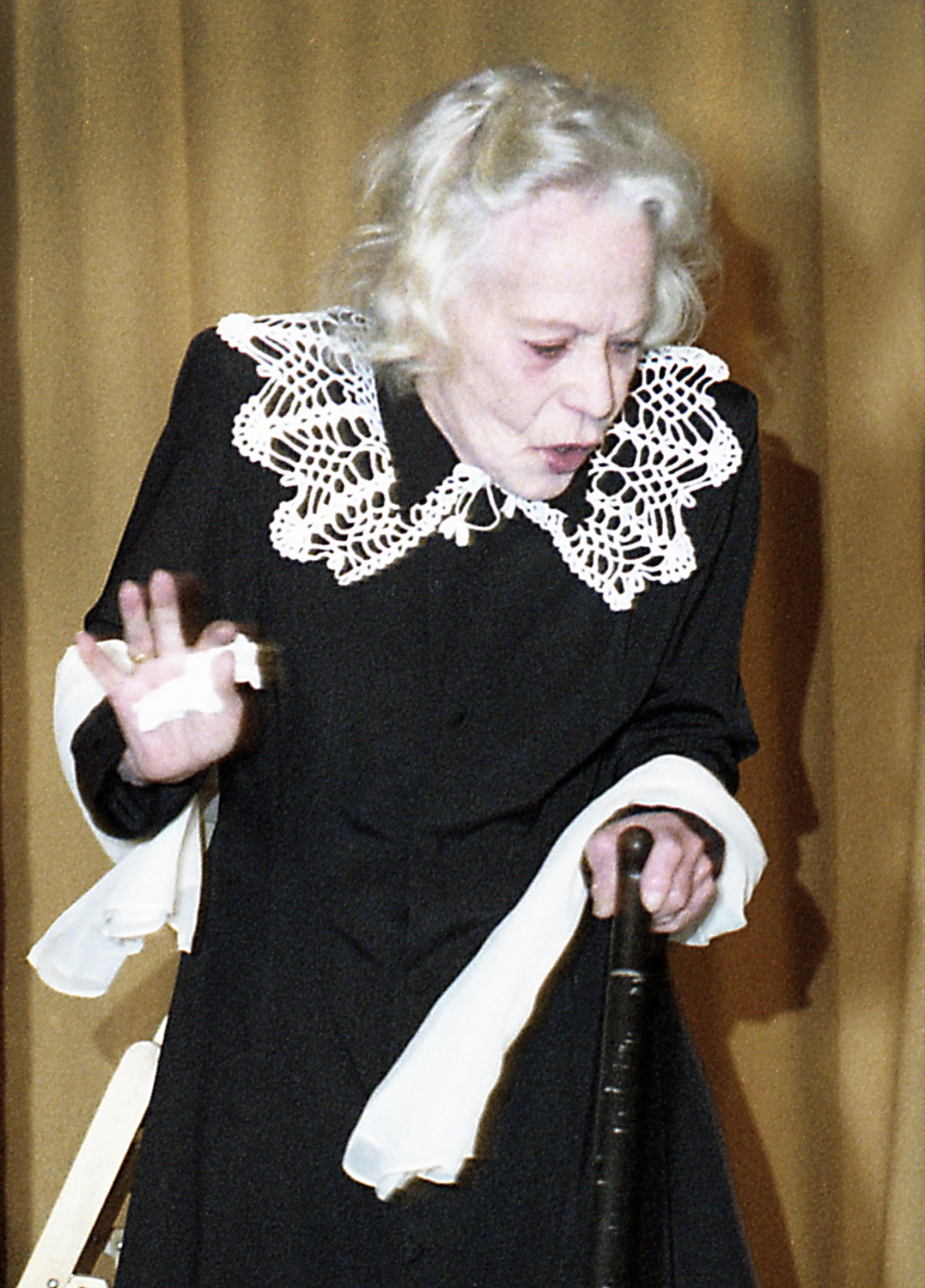
- Reek in 1993
- Born: Salme Helene Reek; 10 November 1907; Pärnu, Governorate of Livonia, Russian Empire
- Died: 9 June 1996 (aged 88); Tallinn, Estonia
- Occupation: Actress
- Years active: 1929–1996
- Spouse: Päären Raudvee (m. 1930; div. 1939)

Salme Helene Reek (10 November 1907 – 9 June 1996) was an Estonian stage, film, radio, and television actress and stage director whose career spanned nearly seventy years; sixty-six of which were spent as an actress at the Estonian Drama Theatre.

== Early life and education ==
Salme Helene Reek was the oldest of three siblings born to paper pulp factory worker Juhan Reek and housewife Julia Reek (née Erberg) in Pärnu. Her younger siblings were Hilda (1911–1990), and Oskar (1922–1939) who died at age seventeen. During Reek's early years, the family lived in near-poverty in a one-room apartment on Suur-Kuke Street, later moving into a two-room studio apartment. Both of Reek's parents were keenly interested in music; her father Juhan played the piano and the harmonium and her mother Julia sang as a first soprano in the family's Lutheran church choir. Both parents were also theatre enthusiasts and Reek often attended theatre productions at Pärnu's Endla Theatre during her early childhood.

Reek began her primary school studies in Pärnu before the family relocated to Tallinn, then returning to Pärnu approximately four years later. The family subsequently returned once more to Tallinn, where Reek attended secondary school at Tallinn 2nd Girls' Gymnasium (now, Tallinn Kristiine Gymnasium), graduating in 1927. Reek performed well in history and language classes and excelled in gymnastics.

Just after graduation in 1927, Reek enrolled in studies at the Drama Theatre Studio School in Tallinn, founded in 1920 by actor and theatre pedagogue Paul Sepp, graduating in 1930. From 1929 until 1933, Reek studied dance with Estonian choreographer and dance teacher Gerd Neggo who, because of Reek's difficult financial situation, taught Reek without charge.

== Career ==
=== Stage ===
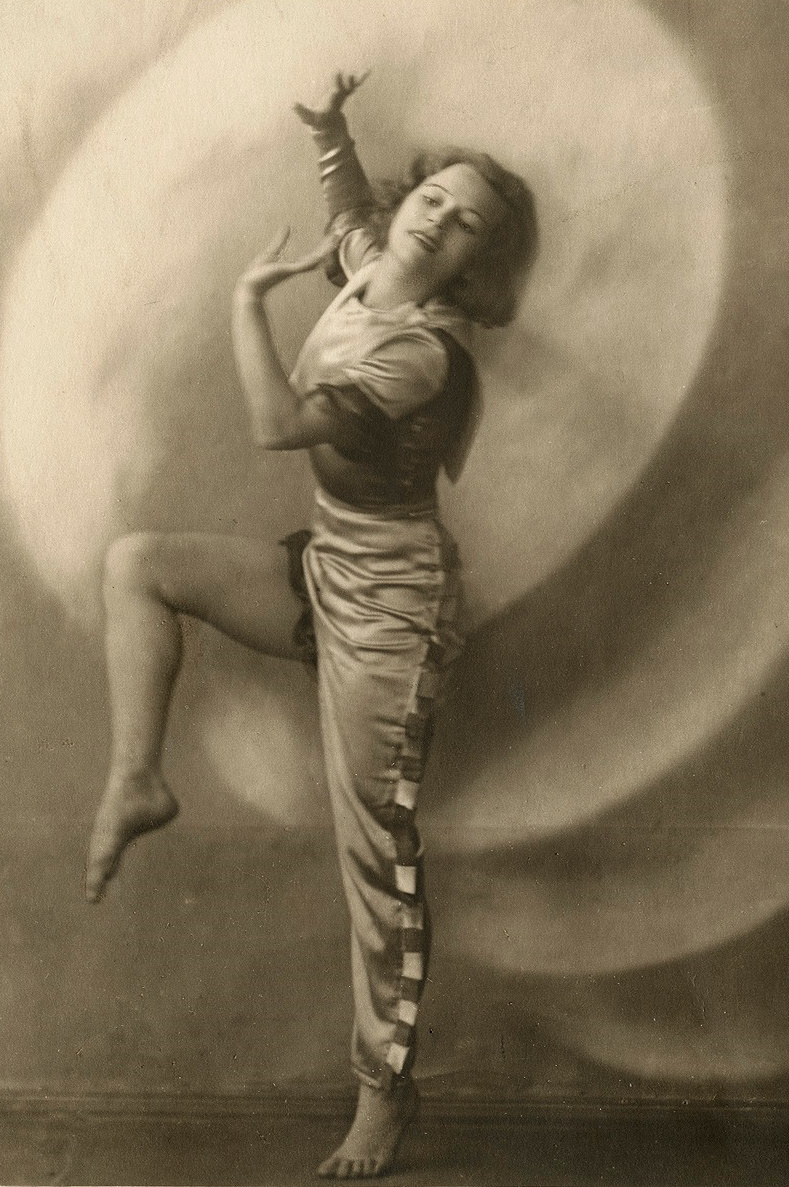
Reek at Gerd Neggo's Dance Studio in 1933

Reek's first prominent stage role at the Drama Theatre School was in the role of the young boy Ubbe in a production of Otto Ernt's Ortrun and Ilsebill in 1929. Following graduation from the Drama Theatre School in 1930, Reek would join the theatre as an actress. In 1937, the theatre would be renamed the Estonian Drama Theatre. She was renowned for her versatility as an actress, and often performed in stage roles as young boys. Reek's portrayals of young boys onstage and in radio theatre were numerous throughout her career and proved to be both publicly popular and critically praised.

Reek's engagement at the theatre would last sixty-six years, from age twenty-two in early 1930 until her death in at age eighty-eight in 1996, appearing in roles in nearly four hundred stage plays, making her one of Estonia's most prolific stage actresses. Her many years with the Estonian Drama Theatre spanned the interwar period of Estonia following independence the Russian Empire, World War II and the Soviet occupation and annexation in 1940, the German occupation of 1941 until 1944, the Soviet occupation from 1944 until 1991 when Estonia regained its independence.

Salme Reek became a member of the Estonian Actors' Union in 1934 and a member of the Estonian Theater Union in 1949.

=== Radio ===
In 1949, Reek made her radio theatre debut as Charley in a production of Valentina Lyubimova's 1948 play The Snowball. Between 1949 and 1993, Reek would appear in approximately one hundred and forty radio plays and radio monologues. As with her stage roles, Reek displayed a great versatility, often performing in voice roles as children (particularly young boys), elderly women, and young female protagonists.

=== Film ===
Reek made her feature film debut in a small role in the 1969 Soviet-Estonian comedy-drama Hullumeelsus, directed by Kaljo Kiisk for Tallinnfilm. This was followed by the role of Epp in the Kiisk directed drama Tuuline rand in 1971, also for Tallinnfilm. In 1972, she played the role of Amanda in the Veljo Käsper directed and Enn Vetemaa penned World War II drama Väike reekviem suupillile. Reek also appeared in a number of other small roles in films during the 1970s, including the Veljo Käsper directed dramaTuulevaikus in 1971 and the Kaljo Kiisk directed romantic-drama Maaletulek in 1973. In 1976, she made an appearance in the Veljo Käsper directed drama film Aeg elada, aeg armastada.

In 1981, Reek appeared in the role of the character Tuiska's wife in the Arvo Kruusement directed period drama Karge meri; a film adaptation of the 1938 novel of the same name by August Gailit about the lives of seal hunters in a small village on the Baltic Sea. In 1984, she appeared in the Helle Karis directed fantasy-family film Karoliine hõbelõng. In 1989, she appeared in the Igor Voznesensky directed Russian language science fiction film Idealnoe prestuplenie, and in 1991 appeared in a small role in another Russian language film, the Aleksandr Polynnikov directed adventure-comedy Obnazhyonnaya v shlyape.

Other films include the 1992 Jüri Sillart directed period drama film Noorelt õpitud, the 1992 Lembit Ulfsak directed family-comedy film Lammas all paremas nurgas, and the 1993 Ilkka Järvi-Laturi directed dark comedy Tallinn pimeduses. Throughout her career, Reek also appeared in a number of short films.

=== Television ===
Salme Reek appeared in a large number of teleplays and television films beginning in the 1970s. Her television debut was in the role of Lady Jedburgh in a Raivo Trass directed teleplay production of Oscar Wilde's Lady Windermere's Fan that aired on Eesti Televisioon (ETV) in 1974. Other teleplay productions included roles in works by such authors and poets including: Eduard Vilde, Juhan Smuul, Emil Braginsky, Mira Lobe, Michael Frayn, and Jean Sarment. Reek's last teleplay performance was in 1993 as Dolores in the Enn Vetemaa penned dark comedy Kas te armastate papagoisid, directed by Vilja Palm.

In 1973, Reek appeared in the Sulev Nõmmik directed and Jaan Rannap penned comedy television film Mishuk. In 1981, she appeared as Liina in the Ago-Endrik Kerge directed comedy television film Pisuhänd, followed by the role of Juula in the 1982 Ago-Endrik Kerge directed Musta katuse all, adapted from the 1960 Juhan Smuul penned drama Lea; and the same year in the Leo Karpin directed musical-comedy romantic television film Teisikud. In 1983, she appeared in the comedy television film Püha Susanna ehk meistrite kool, penned by Enn Vetemaa and again directed by Ago-Endrik Kerge. In 1988, Reek played the role of Siina Aunvärk in the Vladimir Beekman penned and Kerge directed comedy Narva Kosk.

In 1993, Reek had a small role in the Maximilian Schell directed American television drama film Candles in the Dark. This would be Reek's only appearance in an American television film. In 1995, she appeared in another small role in the German television drama film Nadja - Heimkehr in die Fremde, directed by Thorsten Näter, which would be Reek's last television film role.

== Personal life, death, and legacy ==
Salme Reek married stage designer and actor Päären Raudvee in 1930. The couple divorced in 1939. In 1941, Reek began a long-term relationship with actor and theatre director Oskar Põlla which lasted until Põlla's death in 1955. Reek never had children. In her later years, she lived with her sister Hilda until Hilda's death in 1990. Afterwards, she lived alone in Tallinn where she died in 1996 at age 88. She was buried in Tallinn's Metsakalmistu cemetery.

In 2016, Estonian authors Lea Arme and Eike Värk wrote a biography titled Salme Reek. Noor Vana Daam (English: Salme Reek. Young Old Lady), published by Tänapäev in 2017.

In 1997, actor and director Rein Oja established the Salme Reek Award; a theatre award granted by a jury to stage directors, actors, and artists who create or excel in performances of remarkable artistic and child-friendly works.

== Acknowledgements ==
- Merited Artist of the ESSR (1964).
- People's Artist of the ESSR (1969).
