= Laine Mägi =

Estonian actress and dancer (born 1959)

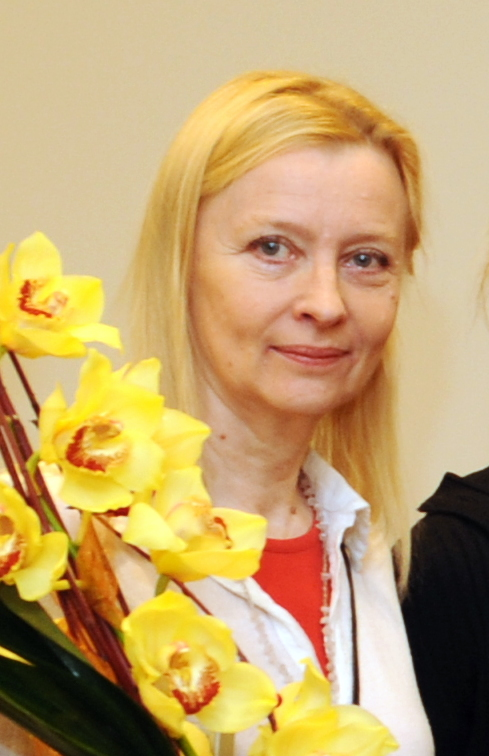
- Born: Laine Mihelson-Adamson; 3 February 1959 (age 67); Kehra, then part of Estonian SSR, Soviet Union
- Education: Estonian Academy of Music and Theatre
- Occupations: Actress, choreographer, dancer
- Years active: 1976–present
- Spouse: Tõnis Mägi (m. 1980; div. 1988)
- Children: Liis-Katrin Mägi
- Relatives: Terje Pennie-Kolberg (first cousin)
- Awards

Laine Mägi (born Laine Mihelson-Adamson; 3 February 1959) is an Estonian stage, film and television actress, dancer, choreographer and dance pedagogue who began her career as a teenager. She is the founder of the Laine Mägi School of Dance, based in Pärnu.

== Early life ==
Laine Mihelson-Adamson was born in Kehra to Peeter and Elli-Anniki Mihelson-Adamson (née Pennie). She has one brother, who is two years younger. Her first cousin is the actress Terje Pennie-Kolberg. She became interested in ballet at an early age and began taking lessons at the Tallinn Ballet School at age nine, taking the train from Kehra to Tallinn. She made her debut at the Estonia Theatre at the age of ten in a stage production of Astrid Lindgren's Pippi Longstocking. She later had to abandon ballet classes in 1973 due to poor health. From 1976 until 1981, she performed as a dancer in various venues throughout Tallinn.

She attended secondary school in Tallinn, graduating in 1977, then enrolling in the Tallinn State Conservatory (now, the Estonian Academy of Music and Theatre) to study acting under the instruction of Aarne Üksküla, graduating in 1982. Among her graduating classmates were Margus Oopkaup, Jaan Rekkor, Anu Lamp, Sulev Teppart, Andrus Vaarik, and Viire Valdma.

== Stage career ==
In 1982, shortly after graduation from the Tallinn State Conservatory, she began an engagement at the Endla Theatre in Pärnu that would last until 1999. She made her stage debut in the role of Susan at the Endla in a production of Stephen Poliakoff's City Sugar in 1982. Other notable roles at the Endla have been in works by: August Strindberg, Selma Lagerlöf, Oskar Luts, Alexandre Dumas, Jean-Paul Sartre and Brian Friel. Since 1999, she has been engaged as an actress and choreographer at the Estonian Drama Theatre in Tallinn. Prominent roles as an actress at the Estonian Drama Theatre have been in works by: William Shakespeare, A. H. Tammsaare, Enn Vetemaa, Madis Kõiv, Oskar Luts, Peter Shaffer, Juan Rulfo and Jane Bowles.

She has also appeared in stage productions at the R.A.A.A.M. theatre and the Vanalinnastuudio in Tallinn, as well as smaller theatres throughout Estonia.

== Dance ==
Since 1982, Mägi has been teaching dance; initially with a small number of students. In 1989, Mägi founded the dance troupe Lancy. In 1996, she founded the Laine Mägi Dance School (Laine Mägi Tantsukool) where she acts as an instructor. Based in Pärnu, the school grew to over three hundred students and another school was opened in Tallinn.

Since 1993, she has been a faculty member at the Estonian Drama Theatre's school of dance and choreography and an associate professor at the school since 1998.

Mägi has also worked as a choreographer for stage productions at the Endla Theatre, Estonian Drama Theatre, Vanalinnastuudio, Vanemuine, Ugala and smaller theatres.

== Film and television ==
Laine Mägi made her television film debut as Miili in the 1987 Peeter Simm directed historical drama Tants aurukatla ümber, based on the 1971 novel of the same name by Estonian author Mats Traat. This was followed by the role of Mimi in the Peeter Urbla directed drama Ma pole turist, ma elan siin in 1989; the role of Lagle in the 1991 Roman Baskin directed drama Rahu tänav; and in the Rao Heidmets directed comedy Kallis härra Q in 1998.

Some of Mägi's more prominent film roles were in Ilmar Raag's 2007 film Klass as Laine, the teacher, which explores school bullying and violence; and a starring role as Anne in Ilmar Raag's 2012 drama Eestlanna Pariisis (French: Une Estonienne à Paris), which paired Mägi opposite French actress Jeanne Moreau. Mägi's performance in Une Estonienne à Paris garnered her a Best Actress award at the 2012 Le Festival International des Jeunes Réalisateurs de Saint-Jean-de-Luz.

Some of her more notable television appearances have been the recurring role of Eve in the popular ETV dramatic series Õnne 13 in 2003; as Sirje Kadak in the historical comedy ENSV, which reflects on life during the 1980s in the Estonian Soviet Socialist Republic; and as Helve in the 2015 Kanal 2 drama series Restart.

== Personal life ==
Laine Mägi was married to musician and actor Tõnis Mägi from 1980 until they divorced in 1988; they have one daughter, Liis-Katrin, born in 1983, who is married to actor Märt Avandi. She is a grandmother.

== Acknowledgments ==
- Estonian Theatre Award (2000)
- 2000 Helmi Tohvelmann award (2000)
- Pärnu Women's award (2000)
- Väike Ants, Estonian Drama Theatre Prize (2008)
- Order of the White Star, Class IV (2012)
- Le Festival International des Jeunes Réalisateurs de Saint-Jean-de-Luz Best Actress Award (2012)
- Foreign Ministry of Culture award (2012)
- Cultural Endowment of Estonia (2012)
- Pärnu Coat of Arms (2012)
- Väike Ants, Estonian Drama Theatre Prize (2014)
- Order of Merit of Pärnu (2022)
