= Anu Lamp =

Estonian actress

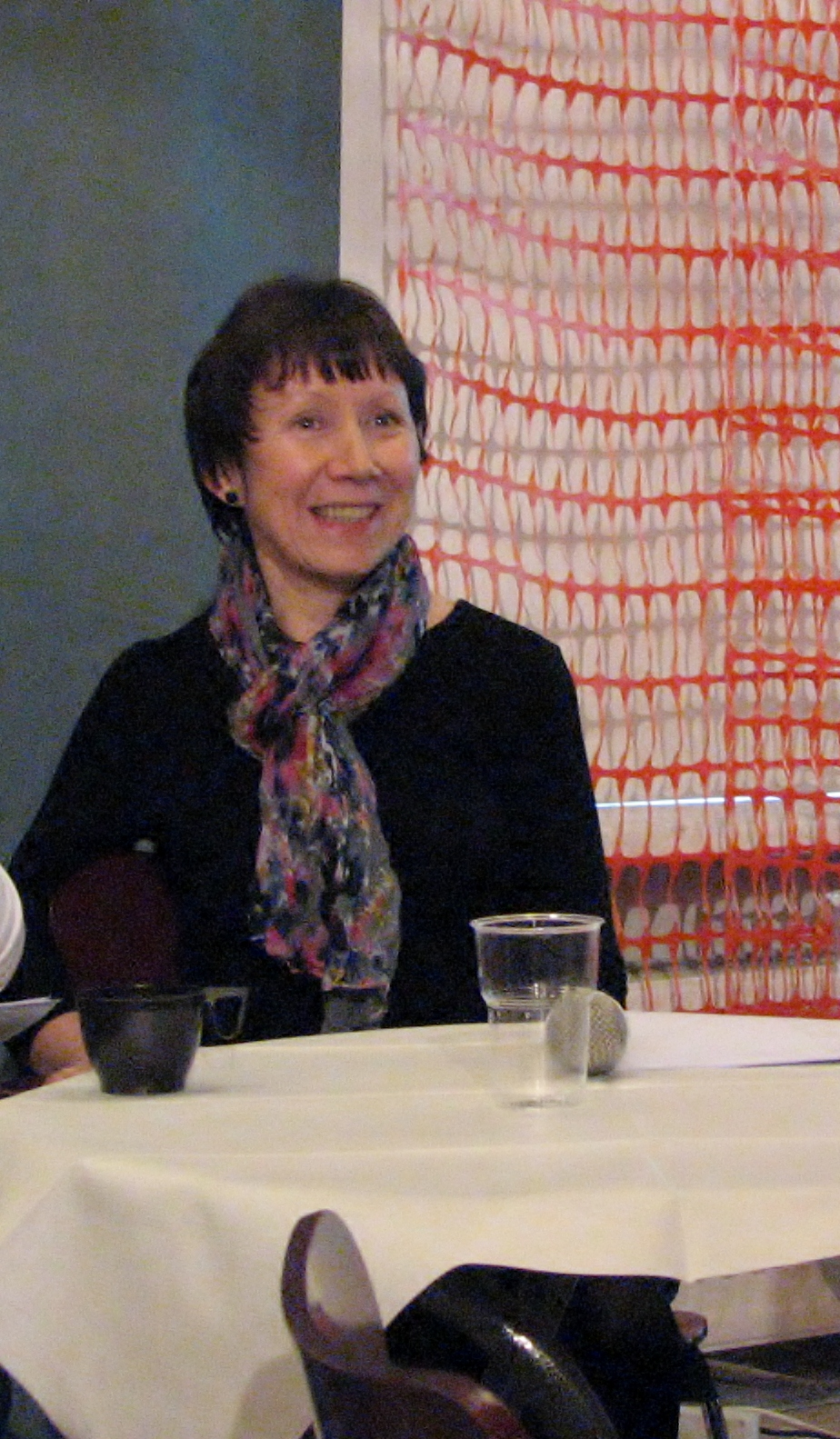
- Born: 29 March 1958 (age 68); Tallinn, then part of Estonian SSR, Soviet Union
- Occupations: Actress, teacher
- Years active: 1982-present
- Spouse: Sulev Teppart (divorced)
- Children: Tõnn Lamp, Jaak Prints, Juhan Teppart
- Awards: Order of the White Star; National Order of Merit

Anu Lamp (born 29 March 1958) is an Estonian stage, film, television and voice actress, stage director, translator and instructor.

== Early life and education ==
Anu Lamp was born in Tallinn. She graduated from secondary school in 1976 at the Tallinn 7th Secondary School (now, the Tallinn English College). From 1976 until 1978, she studied philology at University of Tartu before studying acting under instruction of Aarne Üksküla at the Tallinn State Conservatory (now, the Estonian Academy of Music and Theatre), graduating in 1982. Among her graduating classmates were Margus Oopkaup, Jaan Rekkor, Laine Mägi, Sulev Teppart, Andrus Vaarik, and Viire Valdma.

In June 2016, she graduated from the Institute of Theology of the Estonian Evangelical Lutheran Church with a master's degree in theology.

== Career ==
=== Stage ===
Shortly after graduation in 1982, she became engaged as an actress at the Estonian SSR State Youth Theatre (now, the Tallinn City Theatre). Lamp is still currently engaged as an actress at the theatre. From 2006 until present, she is also the theatre's literary director. She made her stage debut as a student in 1979 and made her stage debut as an actress in a 1982 production of George Bernard Shaw's Saint Joan. Throughout her long career at the Tallinn City Theatre, she has appeared in numerous productions; memorable roles include those in stage productions of works by such varied authors and playwrights as: Shakespeare, Dostoyevsky, Brecht and Weill, Dumas, Chekhov, Molière, Ibsen, Jean Genet, Jean-Paul Sartre, August Gailit, A. H. Tammsaare, Jean-Luc Lagarce, Samuel Beckett and Tom Stoppard, among others.

Lamp has also performed at the Estonian Drama Theatre, Ugala, Rakvere Theatre, Kuressaare City Theatre and the Vanalinnastuudio as well as directed plays at the Estonian Drama Theatre and translated several works from French to Estonian.

She is a member of the Estonian Theatre Association and since 1994 has been a performing faculty member of the Estonian Academy of Music and Theatre.

=== Film and television ===
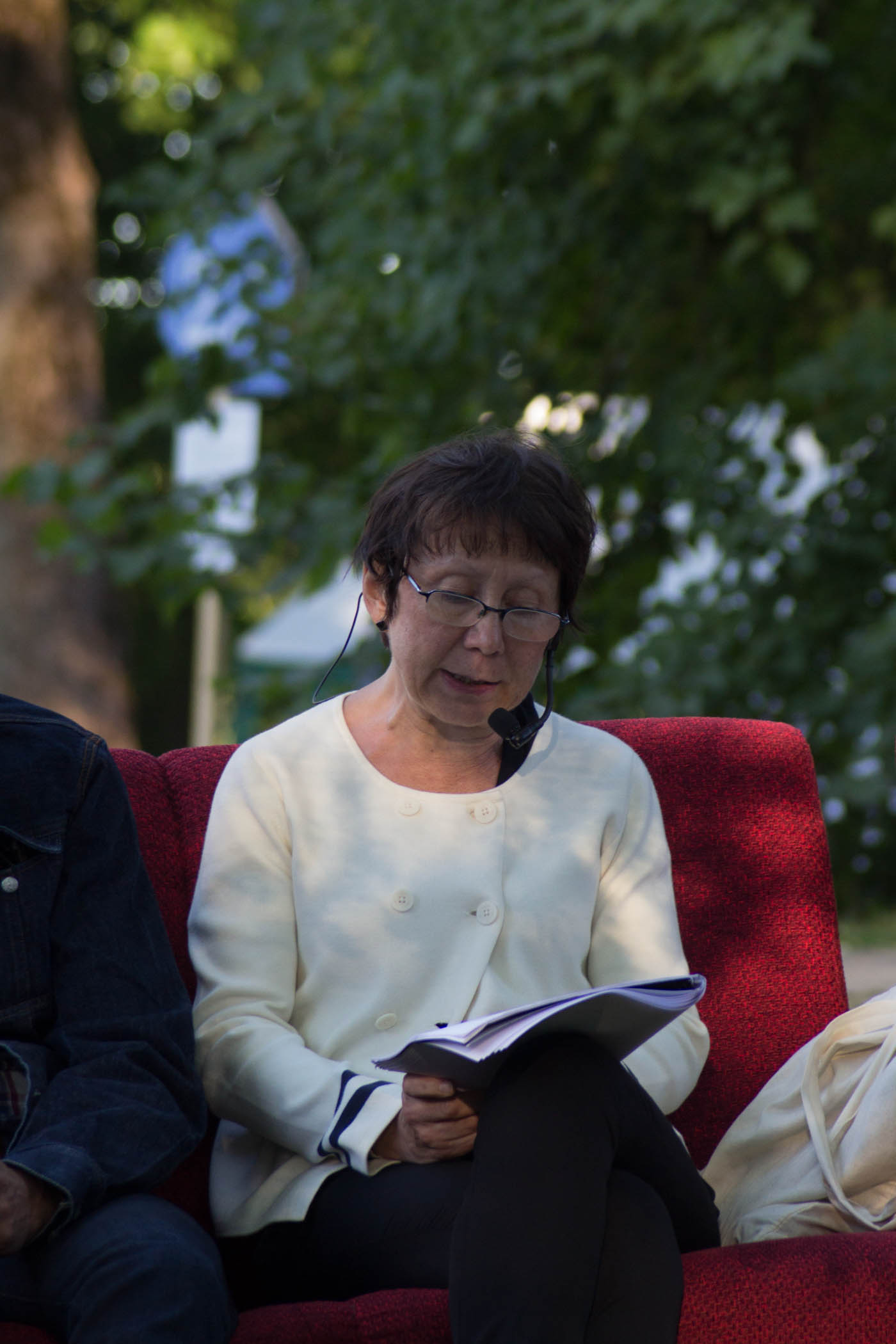
Lamp at Arvamusfestival in 2015

Anu Lamp made her television debut on the ETV comedy series Kitsas king in 1982. From 1995 until 1998 she appeared as Liisi on the comedy television series M Klubi; from 2001 until 2003, she appeared in the role of Vaike on the long-running ETV dramatic series Õnne 13; and in 2012, as Kersti Kotkas in the ETV crime-mystery series Alpimaja. Her first feature-length television film was role was in the 1988 Mikk Mikiver directed drama Doktor Stockmann, for Tallinnfilm.

Lamp's film debut was in the Jaan Kolberg directed short film Õnnelik lapsepõlv in 1988. Her first feature-length film role was as Mrs. Murumägi in the 1992 family film Lammas all paremas nurgas, directed by Lembit Ulfsak. Other notable films include: Ma olen väsinud vihkamast (1995), Kirjad idast (1995), Vedma (2006), Elavad pildid (2013), Supilinna Salaselts (2015) and Perekonnavaled (2016).

Beginning in 1997, with the release of the animated children's film Tom ja Fluffy, Lamp has also built a career as a voice actress. She has voiced characters in several of the animated Estonian Lotte films; including the first Lotte film, Lotte Goes South (2000); Lotte from Gadgetville (2007); Lotte and the Moonstone Secret (2011); and Lotte and the Lost Dragons (2019). She has also provided the Estonian language dubbing for such foreign language animated films as: Ice Age, Ice Age: The Meltdown and Shrek 2.

== Personal life ==
Anu Lamp currently resides in Tallinn. She was married to actor Sulev Teppart; however, the two later divorced. Lamp and Teppart have three sons: Tõnn Lamp, Jaak Prints and Juhan Teppart. Tõnn Lamp and Jaak Prints are also actors. She is a grandmother.

== Awards and honors ==
- Ants Lauter Award(1989)
- Aleksander Kurtna Estonian Theatre Prize (1993)
- Estonian Cultural Endowment of the Arts Foundation (1995 and 1997)
- Order of the White Star, V Class
- Aleksander Kurtna Estonian Theatre Prize (2002)
- Karl Ader Prize (2003)
- Priit Põdroos Estonian Theatre Award (2006)
- Radio Theatre Actor Award (2007)
- Tallinn City Theatre Prize, Best Female Colleague (2010)
- Tallinn City Theatre's Audience Prize (2012)
- Eesti Päevaleht Prize (2013)
- National Order of Merit of France; Chevalier (2015)
- Estonian Theatre Association's Supporting Actress Award (Ara in the play A Baltic Tragedy, 2022)
