= Jaan Rekkor =

Estonian theater, film, and television actor

- Born: 3 April 1958 (age 68); Hõreda, then part of Estonian SSR, Soviet Union
- Occupation: Actor
- Years active: 1980 – present
- Spouse: Anu Lembra
- Children: 3

Jaan Rekkor (born 3 April 1958) is an Estonian stage, film and television actor.

== Early life and education ==
Jaan Rekkor was born in the small village of Hõreda in Rapla County. He attended schools in Märjamaa, graduating from the Ants Lauter Märjamaa Secondary School in 1976 (now, Märjamaa Gymnasium). Between 1976 and 1979, he studied journalism at the University of Tartu. He then studied acting at the Tallinn State Conservatory's Performing Arts Department (now, the Estonian Academy of Music and Theatre), graduating in 1982. Among his graduating classmates were Margus Oopkaup, Anu Lamp, Laine Mägi, Sulev Teppart, Andrus Vaarik, and Viire Valdma.

== Stage career ==
Following his graduation from the Tallinn State Conservatory, Rekkor began an engagement as a stage actor at the Endla Theatre in Pärnu in 1982 where, to date, he has appeared in approximately one hundred stage roles and productions. In 2005, he began an engagement at the Estonian Drama Theatre in Tallinn. His first appearance at the Estonian Drama Theatre was a small role of a Native-American in a production of J. M. Barrie's Peter Pan in 1980. However, his first role at the Estonian Drama Theatre as an actor engaged at the theatre was as Othello in William Shakespeare's Othello in 2005. Rekkor is currently still engaged as an actor at both theatres and divides his time between the two.

During his many years onstage as a theatre actor, Rekkor has received a number of awards and acknowledgements, among them:

- Estonian Theatre Award for Best Male Actor (1988)
- Estonian Theatre Association's annual award for Best Male Actor of 1989 (1989)
- Ants Lauter Award (1990)
- Annual Award of the Estonian Cultural Foundation (1994)
- Endla Audience Favorite (1996, 1998, 2001, and 2005)
- Colleague Award (1999, and 2001)
- Estonian Theatre Award for Best Supporting Actor (2002 and 2003)

== Film career ==
Rekkor's first significant film role came in 1983 as the character Jaanus Roog in the Kaljo Kiisk directed film Nipernaadi, based on the 1928 novel Toomas Nipernaadi by Estonian writer August Gailit. This was followed in 1986 by the role of Jaan Kreuks in the Kaljo Kiisk directed and Mati Unt penned Tallinnfilm biographical drama Saja aasta pärast mais about leading Estonian Communist Party politician Viktor Kingissepp. In 1989, he played the role of Peeter Kängsepp in the Jüri Sillart directed historical drama Äratus, which chronicled "Operation Priboi"; the 25 to 28 March 1949 Soviet mass deportation of more than 90,000 Estonians, Latvians and Lithuanians labeled as enemies of the people to forced settlements in inhospitable areas of the Soviet Union.

In 1992, Jaan Rekkor was cast in the role of Muna in the Mati Põldre directed biographical drama Need vanad armastuskirjad which explored the life of Raimond Valgre, an Estonian songwriter of the 1930s and the 1940s. In 1997, he appeared in the Hardi Volmer directed historical comedy Minu Leninid. This was followed by a role in the 1998 René Vilbre directed short film Perekondlik sündmus.

During the 2000s, Rekkor appeared in several films; most memorably as Roland in the 2005 René Vilbre comedy-family film Röövlirahnu Martin, starring Ott Sepp and Madis Ollikainen; as Coach in the 2006 Laila Pakalniņa directed comedy-drama Koer, lennuk ja laulupidu; a small role in the gritty 2008 René Vilbre directed drama Mina olin siin, which was adapted from the 2005 novel Mina olin siin. Esimene arest by Sass Henno; and as Carabas Barabas in the musical-comedy Buratino, directed by Rasmus Merivoo.

In 2013, Rekkor appeared in the role of Bonifacius in the René Vilbre directed fantasy-film Väikelinna detektiivid ja valge daami saladus. In 2016, he appeared in the Anu Aun directed Luxfilm romantic-drama Polaarpoiss. In 2018, he appeared in the Anu Aun directed family-Christmas film Eia jõulud Tondikakul. In 2022, he appeared as the character Keterlyn's father in the Elmo Nüganen directed historical mystery thriller Apteeker Melchior. Timuka tütar, based on the 2011 novel Apteeker Melchior ja timuka tütar by Indrek Hargla

During his career, Rekkor has also appeared in a number of short films.

== Television career ==
Jaan Rekkor's television debut was the role of Mister Saul in the 1995 Vilja Palm directed Eesti Televisioon (ETV) period drama mini-series Wikmani poised, adapted from the 1988 semi-autobiographical Jaan Kross novel of the same name. Between 1995 and 1998 he appeared on the comedy series M Klubi. In 2013, he appeared in the role of Mart in the Finnish television romantic-drama miniseries Vaarallista kokea. Rekkor would go on to perform in a number of roles in Estonian television series. He is possibly best recalled for his role as Rein Pihelgas in the ETV crime series Ohtlik lend from 2006 to 2007, and as the same character as in the Ain Prosa directed TV3 comedy-crime series Kättemaksukontor from 2010 until 2013. Carmen Mikiver played Rein Pihelgas' wife Ivi in both series.

In 2021, he appeared as the character Risto Kurm in the Priit Pius directed television drama series Süü.

== Personal life ==
Jaan Rekkor is married to Anu Lembra. The couple have three children; the eldest is daughter Lyssi-Ann, and sons Tuudur-Jaan, and Reuben-Jaan. The family reside in Pärnu, while Rekkor divides his time between Pärnu and Tallinn.

Rekkor has been publicly open about his past history of alcoholism. He is now sober and has not drank alcohol in many years.
