= Kersti Heinloo =

Estonian actress

- Born: 26 September 1976 (age 49); Tartu, then part of Estonian SSR, Soviet Union
- Occupation: actor
- Years active: 1994–present
- Spouse: Janek Joost
- Children: 2

Kersti Heinloo (born 26 September 1976) is an Estonian stage, film and television actress who began her career in radio.

== Early life and education ==
Born in Tartu, Kersti Heinloo received her secondary education at the Pärnu Koidula Gymnasium, graduating in 1994. From 1995 until 1996, she studied radio direction at the Tallinn Pedagogical University (now, Tallinn University) before applying and being accepted to the performing arts department of the Estonian Academy of Music and Theatre in Tallinn, where she graduated from in 2000. Among her graduating classmates were actors Maarja Jakobson, Margus Prangel, Eva Püssa, Katrin Pärn, Tambet Tuisk, Piret Simson and directors Urmas Lennuk, Tiit Ojasoo and Vahur Keller. From 2005 to 2006, she took a one-year course in motion picture production at the Brighton Film School in the U.K.

== Stage career ==
In 2000, Heinloo began a five year engagement at the Vanemuine theatre in Tartu; she made her stage debut in a production of Henry Fielding's The History of Tom Jones, a Foundling. She would perform in a variety of roles in works by such international playwrights and authors as: William Shakespeare, Mikhail Bulgakov, Roberto Zucco, Jerry Bock, Emily Brontë, Anton Chekhov, August Strindberg, Henrik Ibsen and Willy Russell, among others. Roles in works by Estonian authors and playwrights at the Vanemuine include: Mati Unt, August Gailit, Juhan Smuul, Johann Voldemar Jannsen, Jaan Kaplinski, Urmas Vadi, Loone Ots, Ivar Põllu, Kauksi Ülle and others.

For two years after leaving the Vanemuine, Heinloo was a freelance actress. In 2007, she began an engagement as an actress at the Estonian Drama Theatre (Eesti Draamateater) where she made her stage debut in the role of Annikki in Antti Tuuri's A River Flows Through the City. Other prominent roles at the Estonian Drama Theatre were in works by Lauri Lagle, Anton Chekhov, Shakespeare, Tennessee Williams, Enda Walsh, Madis Kõiv, Fyodor Dostoyevsky, Eugene O'Neill and Andrus Kivirähk.

Heinloo has also performed onstage at the Tallinn City Theatre, Tartu New Theatre, MTÜ Tuulekell and Kell Kümme theatres.

== Film and television ==
Kersti Heinloo made her film debut in a small role in the 1998 Sulev Keedus directed drama Georgica. This was followed by a starring role as Monika, opposite actor Mait Malmsten, in the 2002 Marko Raat directed action-adventure Agent Sinikael (English release title: Agent Wild Duck). Other starring roles include that of Tuule in the Marko Raat directed 2010 drama Nuga and the 2011 TTV six-part satirical comedy television mini-series Teise mehe pea, directed by Roman Baskin and co-starring Jan Uuspõld. Heinloo is possibly best recalled by television audiences as the character Maria in the Kanal 2 drama eries Pilvede all, a role she played from 2010 until 2015. In 2016, she appeared in the Anu Aun directed drama film Polaarpoiss. In 2023, she appeared as Ülle in the Mart Kivastik penned and directed comedy feature film Taevatrepp. In 2017, she provided the voice of Mother in the Sulev Keedus directed drama film Mehetapja/Süütu/Vari and in 2019, had a starring role in the Urmas Eero Liiv-directed horror film Kiirtee põrgusse.

In 2024, she appeared as Liise in the Jaak Kilmi directed and Indrek Hargla penned period crime drama feature film Vari; a fictionalized account of poet Juhan Liiv.

== Personal life ==
Kersti Heinloo currently resides in Tallinn. She is married to actor Janek Joost and the couple have two sons.

== Awards ==
- Voldemar Panso Prize (1998)
- Best Female Colleague award, Vanemuise (2000)
- Väike Ants, Estonian Drama Theatre Prize (2010)
- Ants Lauter Award (2011)
- Suur Ants, Estonian Drama Theatre Prize (2011)
- Estonian Theatre Award, Best Female Leading role (Julie; Preili Julie) (2014)
