= Purpurne surm =

1924 novel by August Gailit

- Author: August Gailit
- Language: Estonian
- Publication date: 1924
- Publication place: Estonia

Purpurne surm (Estonian for Purple Death) is a novel by Estonian author August Gailit. It was first published in 1924.
