= Kaljuste =

Kaljuste is an Estonian surname. Notable people with the surname include:

- Tõnu Kaljuste (born 1953), Estonian conductor
- Ülle Kaljuste (born 1957), Estonian actress
