= Ivan Orav =

Ultra-patriotic fictional character created by Estonian writer Andrus Kivirähk

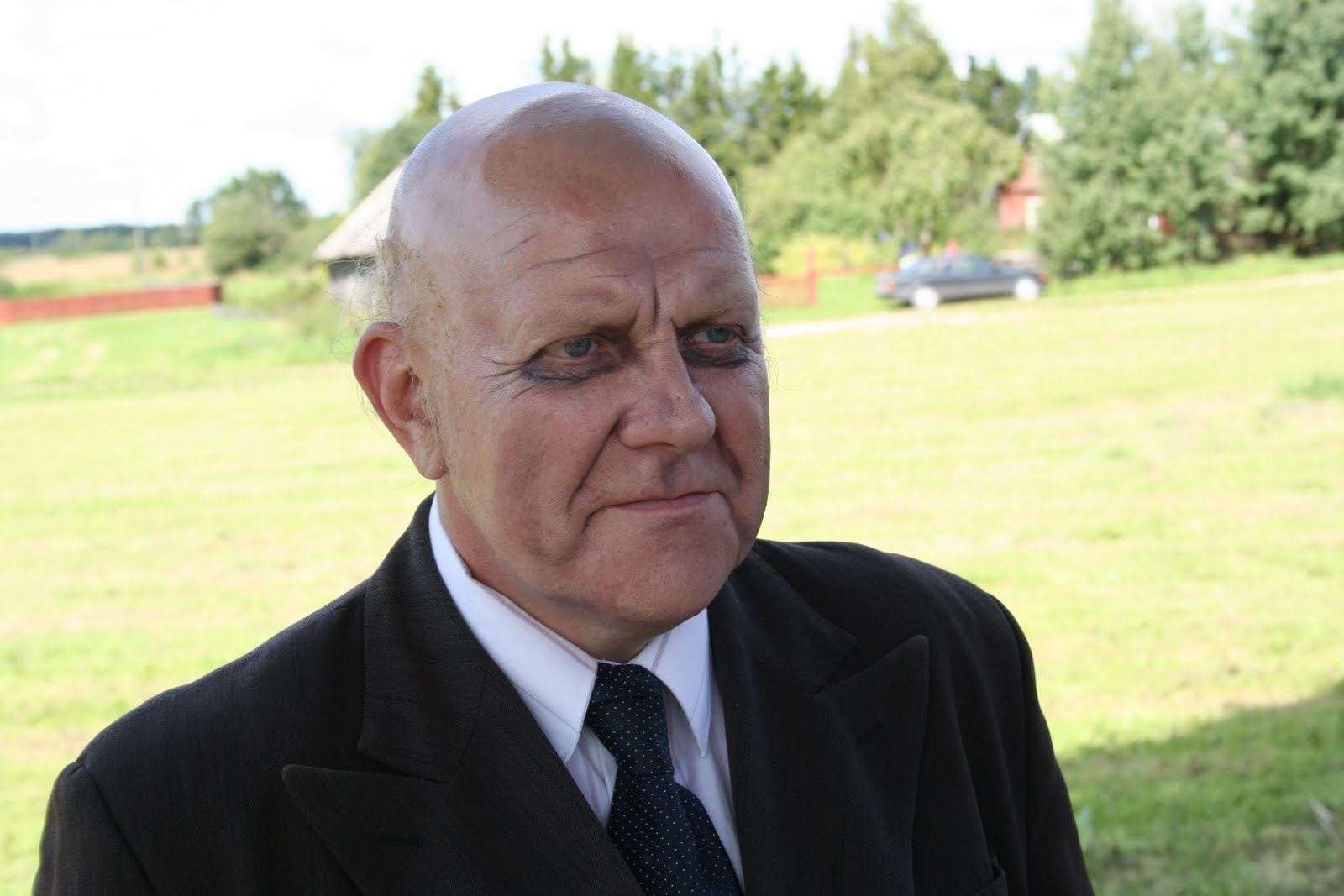
Ivan Orav played by Andrus Vaarik.

Ivan Orav (September 1, 1908 – June 19, 2009) is a fictional character created by Estonian writer Andrus Kivirähk, who published a book "Memoirs of Ivan Orav or the Past as Azure Mountains" (Ivan Orava mälestused, ehk, Minevik kui helesinised mäed) in 1995. The book mocks popular stereotypes about the interbellum period of Estonian independence.

Over time, the character was fleshed out (through publications in Eesti Päevaleht newspaper), anticipated and celebrated his 100th anniversary. His biography was finalised in his obituary next year.

During 1994 and 1995 a TV series Vabariigi valvur was aired with Andrus Vaarik as Ivan Orav.

In the summertime of 2004 the Estonian State Archives joined the joke by uncovering and publishing a birth register of the Tõhela-Murru Eastern Orthodox Church which said that Ivan Orav and his wife Jelisaveta had daughter Lyudmila. Also, before the coming of the Soviet tiblas he changed his name to Jaan in 1939.
