= Martin Algus =

Estonian actor, screenwriter, playwright and translator

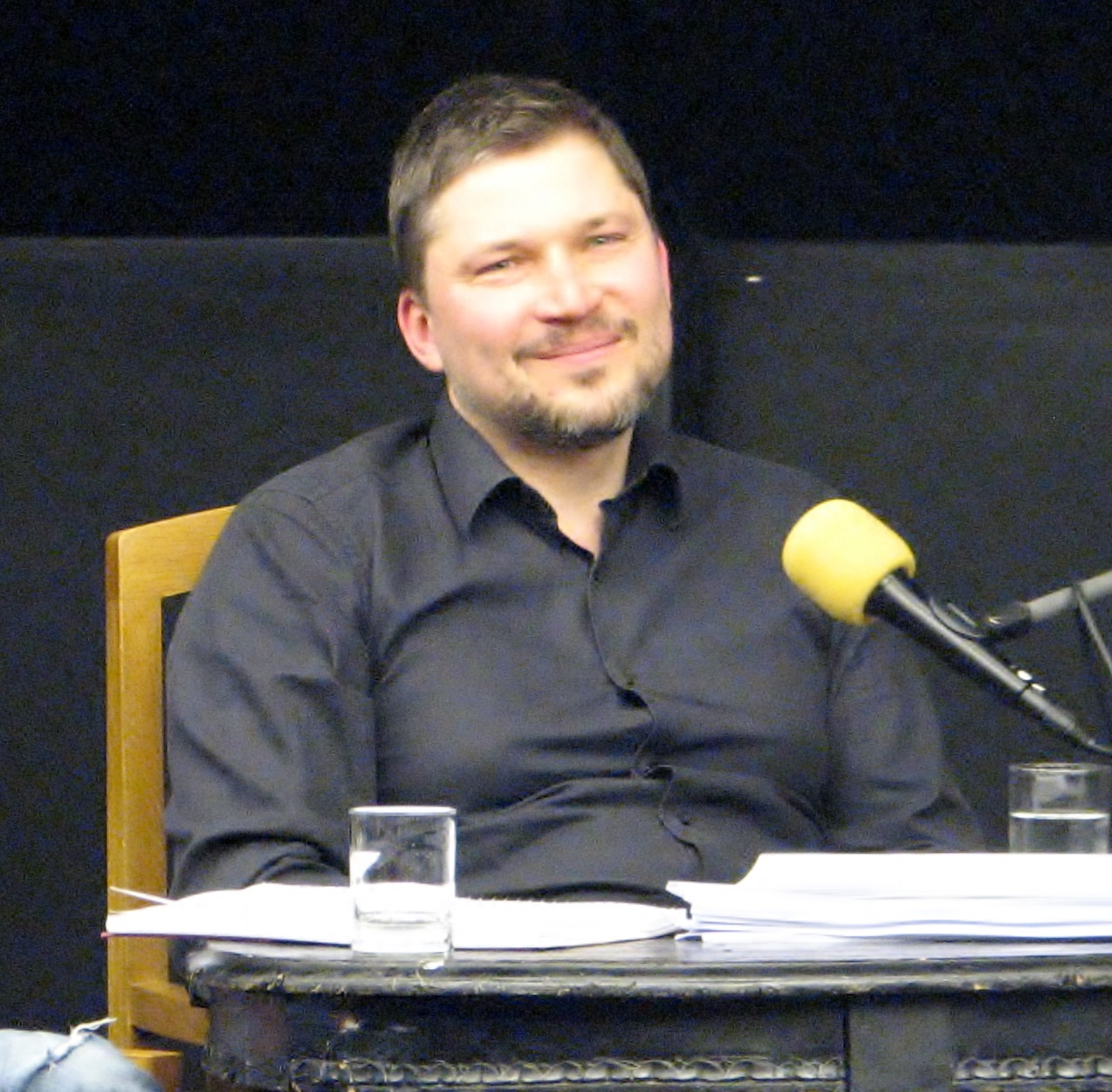
Martin Algus in 2014

Martin Algus (born 25 December 1973) is an Estonian actor, screenwriter, playwright and translator.

Algus was born in Jõgeva. He worked as a stage actor at the Ugala from 1997 to 2005, and has been working in the field of advertising and translation since 2005. He has also appeared in a number of films and in television roles.

In 2018 his debut novel was published. It was titled Midagi tõelist ('Something Real').

== Awards ==
- 2018: Cultural Endowment of Estonia's Award for Prose

== Selected filmography ==
- 1995: Ma olen väsinud vihkamast (feature film; role: Jüri)
- 2017: Sangarid (feature film; screenwriter; in the role: Estonian investigator)
- 2018: Klassikokkutulek 2: Pulmad ja matused (feature film; screenwriter; in the role: (Estonian: Kopterimees))
- 2019: Klassikokkutulek 3: Ristiisad (feature film; screenwriter; in the role: physician)
- 2019: Talve (feature film; screenwriter)
- 2021: Soo (feature film; producer, screenwriter)
- 2023: Tähtsad ninad (feature film, screenwriter)
- 2026: Midagi tõelist (feature film, screenwriter; in the role of probation officer)
