= Virve Koppel =

Estonian television and film director

Virve Koppel (7 October 1931 in Tallinn – 26 May 2016) was an Estonian television and film director.

== Education and career ==
In 1956 she graduated from Lunacharsky State Institute for Theatre Arts (GITIS). 1956-1989 she worked as an editor and director at Eesti Televisioon.

== Awards ==
- 1975: Estonian SSR merited cultural personnel

== Filmography ==
Filmography:

- Pööripäev (1964)
- Reportaaž telefoniraamatu järgi (with Mati Põldre, 1966)
- Meestele (1967)
- Mina ise (1969)
- Kivikasukas (1969)
- Poiste saar (1977)
- Maa keset merd (1981)
