= Fairyland (Gailit novel) =

1918 novel by August Gailit

Muinasmaa
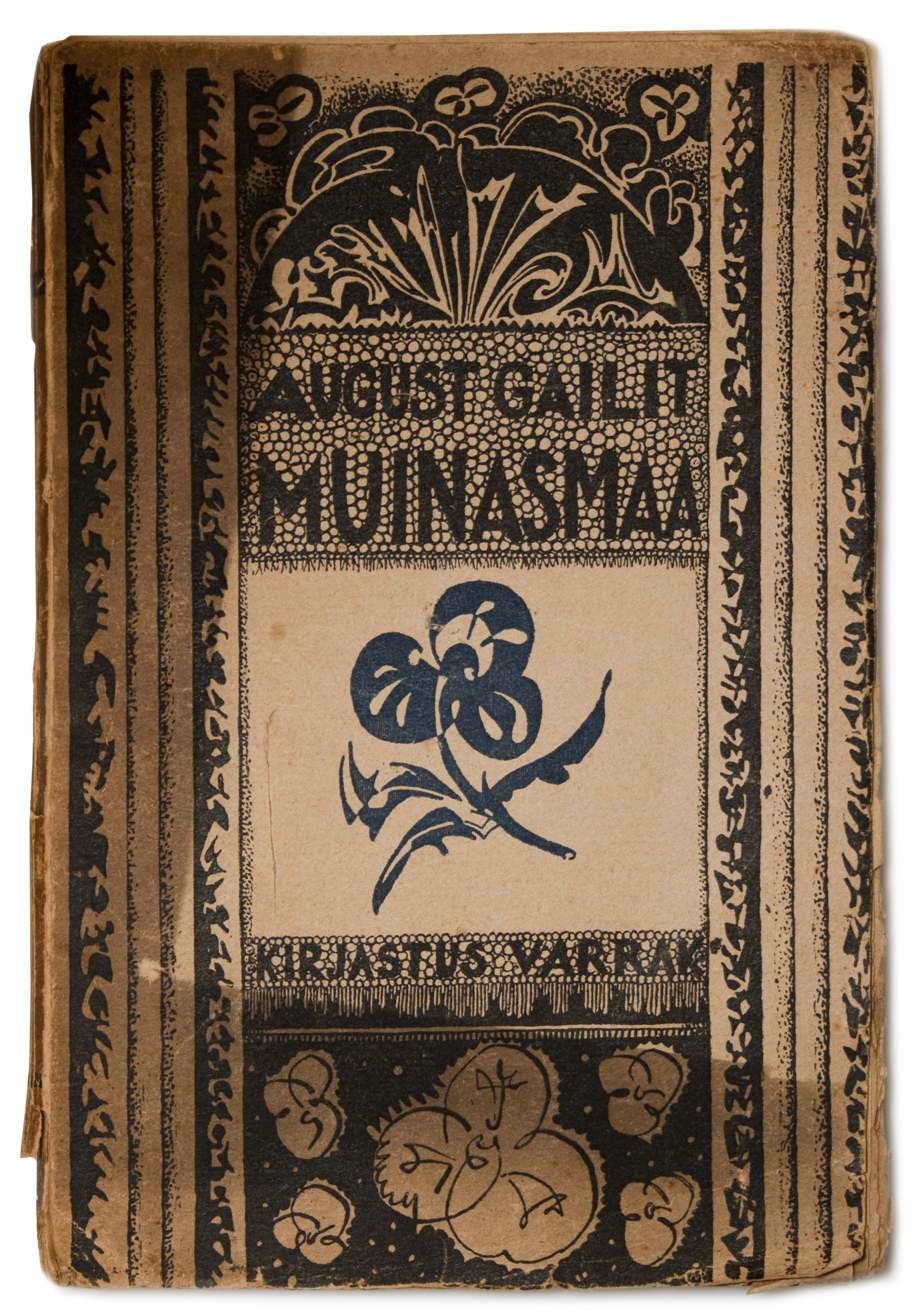
- Cover of 1920 published version.
- Language: Estonian
- Publication place: Estonia

Fairyland (Estonian: Muinasmaa) is a novel by Estonian author August Gailit. It was completed in 1914 and first published in 1918, and it was Gailit's first novel.

Fairyland is a story about the adventures of two bohemians, the writer Morin and the painter Bruno Erms, in Estonia during the summer. It is a romantic story in which love and passion alternate with descriptions of the natural beauty in summer and portrayals of village life, combined with humor. The main plot of Fairyland takes place on the Meigaste farm, where both Morin and Erms fall in love with the family’s daughter.

The novel was republished in Sweden in 1965, with a preface by Arvo Mägi and illustrations by Endel Kõks, to mark the 75th anniversary of Gailit's birth.

== See also ==
- Estonian literature
