= Hüvasti, kollane kass =

1963 novel by Mati Unt

- Cover of 1967 published version.
- Language: Estonian
- Publication place: Estonia

Hüvasti, kollane kass (Farewell, Yellow Cat) is the debut novel by the Estonian author Mati Unt. It was first published in 1963.
