= Gerd Neggo =

Estonian music educator, choreographer and dancer (1891–1974)

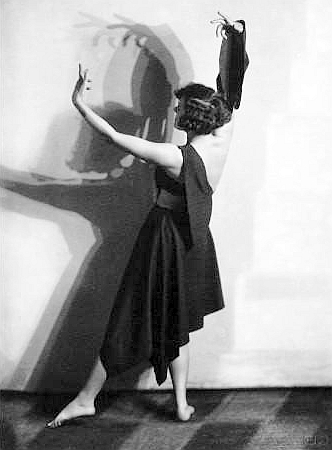
- Neggo in 1928
- Born: 9 November 1891; Kuressaare, Governorate of Livonia
- Died: 1 September 1974 (aged 82); Stockholm, Sweden
- Occupation: Portrait photography
- Known for: Dancer, teaching dance and choreography
- Notable work: Founder of Estonian modern dance and mime

Gerd Neggo (9 November 1891 – 1 September 1974) was an Estonian dancer, dance teacher and choreographer. She studied the musical response methods of É. Jaques-Dalcroze, trained under Rudolf von Laban in Hamburg, Germany, and in 1924 established her own dance studio at Tallinn, Estonia, and promoted modern dance and mime based on classical ballet. During the Soviet occupation of Estonia, she and her husband Paul Olak migrated to Sweden. Her contributions to the cultural heritage of Estonia, as the founder of modern dance and mime in her country, is recognised via a scholarship, awarded annually since 2011.

== Biography ==
Gerd Neggo was born in Kuressaare, Estonia, in 1891. She initially studied the Émile Jaques-Dalcroze methodology in Stockholm, then studied modern dance and mime under Rudolf von Laban, a Hungarian with an education in classical ballet, in his dance studio in Hamburg.

After specializing in the art of modern dance, Neggo returned to Tallinn and established her own dance school in 1924. Here, she started teaching students adopting Laban's modern dance technique. She organized many solo and group dances, including pantomimes. She and her group held performances at the Estonian Drama Theatre in plays for children and young people with modern dance interludes, promoting intellectual, expressive, and creative development. Among the many famous artists who trained in her school were Ida Urbel (1900–83; she later founded the Vanemuine dance company in 1935 and was its director until 1973); actress Salme Reek; Helmi Tohvelman; Edith Oltrop; Ida Urbel; Oskar Põlla; and Adele Kalmet.

In 1925, she married Paul Olak, a theatre manager, journalist and dramaturge. In 1944, following the Soviet occupation and annexation of Estonia, she and her husband migrated to Sweden, initially staying in refugee camps, and sought job opportunities through correspondence with other Estonians living in Swedish camps. They were instrumental in creating a cultural life for Estonians living in the camps. Olak died in December 1949. In 1952 she performed with other Estonian expatriates at the Royal Swedish Opera in Stockholm. Neggo died in Stockholm in 1974.

In recognition of her contributions in founding modern dance in Estonia and promoting it as a national cultural heritage, the Estonian Cultural Endowment for Folk Culture of the Government of Estonia instituted an annual scholarships award, in 2011, to artists who promote modern dance as dance teachers. The scholarship is awarded through the Estonian Dance Education Union. It carries a cash prize to meet training costs within Estonia or €1000 for training abroad.

== Citations and references ==
=== Cited sources ===
- Nagy, Peter; Rouyer, Philippe (3 October 2014). World Encyclopedia of Contemporary Theatre: Volume 1: Europe. Routledge. ISBN 978-1-136-11804-3.
