= Tibla =

Estonian insult for a disrespectful Russian-speaker

Tibla (tiblad in plural) is an insult in the Estonian language, which typically refers to a Russian-speaking citizen of the former Soviet Union (USSR) who is hostile towards other cultures and countries. Tibla was a censored word during the 1944–1991 Soviet occupation of Estonia.

== Origin ==
There are several hypotheses about the origin of the word.

Estonian journalist Voldemar Kures in the 1962 Väliseestlase kalender ("Calendar for Estonians Abroad", lit. "An Expat Estonian's Calendar") suggests, that the word comes from the name of the Vitebsk Governorate, in reference to Russian construction workers during World War I, who mostly came to Estonia from Vitebsk and were considered rather dumb. They were called tipski (a corruption of Vitebski – "one of Vitebsk"; tipskid in plural), which later became tibla. A similar version is the corruption of viteblyane/vitiblyane (витебляне) – "people of Vitebsk" or "people from Vitebsk". The 1937 Eesti Entsüklopeedia (Estonian Encyclopedia) is also believed to have such a reference.

Tibla was already in widespread use during the Estonian War of Independence (1918–1920), as documented by then-current war correspondence between officers and higher-ups. At the time, the word was used to denote non-local Russians (more specifically males and low-ranking soldiers), independent of their affiliation during the concurrent Russian Civil War.

The 1936–1937 war memories journal Vabadussõja lood ("Stories of the War of Independence") featured the word more widely both in soldiers' recollections, war songs and anecdotes. Of the soldier's songs, two used the titular word in their lyrics: Vabariigi pealinnas ("In the Capital City of the Republic", alternately titled "Linda"; the former title was used in print, and the latter appeared in folklore), which indicated the worry of Estonian soldiers that young women would choose to bide their time with men of other nationalities during the absence of Estonian men themselves; and Tibla seltsimees ("The Comrade of a Tibla", or "The Tibla Comrade").

Another hypothesis is that the word comes from the Russian profane addressing ty, blyad, ты, блядь ("you bitch", and the like) or, truncated, ty, blya, ты, бля.

== Modern definition ==
The Estonian Press Council offers an opinion that the term tibla is mostly applied to a Homo Sovieticus kind of person: lacking culture, uneducated, with imperialist worldview; one who does not respect the host country's language, culture, and its native inhabitants.

The word began to be actively used in Estonian media since the 1990s by "Ivan Orav", a fictional character created by Andrus Kivirähk. According to "Orav", the word tibla has nothing to do with Russians, but that tiblad are instead small pink creatures that first appeared in Estonia in June 1940.

The 2006 European Network Against Racism report mentions the recent use of the word tibla in Estonian-language media as an example of inappropriate language.

== Controversies ==
In 2002, the Estonian Press Council settled the case when the newspaper Eesti Päevaleht printed an advertisement: "Don't you read the Päevaleht? You must be a tibla then. Be a true Estonian and become the reader."

In 2008 the usage of the word in media caused a controversy, when Estonian TV aired the film Airheads, in which the slur "retards" was translated as tibla (a completely different meaning). When confronted, the translator, a well-known linguist, apologised, saying that she was careless.

== See also ==
- Katsap
- Rashism
- Vatnik

== Notes ==
1. While the word blyad literally means "slut", "bitch", and "whore", in this context it is used as a non-personal offensive interjection; especially its truncated form 'blya', which is never used in its literal meaning of "whore".
