= Ela Tomson =

Estonian journalist, screenwriter and politician (born 1945)

Ela Tomson (born Ela Liimeon; 16 February 1945) is an Estonian television journalist, editor, screenwriter, and politician. She was a member of X Riigikogu.

== Early life and career ==
Tomson was born in Pärnu. She is a 1967 graduate of Tartu State University, with a degree in journalism. During her studies, she worked as an assistant to theatre director Kaarel Ird at the Vanemuine theatre in Tartu. Later, she worked as an editor and screenwriter at Eesti Telefilm. From 1972 until 1992, she worked as an editor at Eesti Televisioon before taking a position as an editor-in-chief at Pärnu Raadio from 1992 until 1994. In 1994, she returned to Eesti Television as the editor-in-chief; a position she held until 2000. Afterward, she taught secondary school in Pärnu until 2003, when she became involved in politics.

She has been a member of Res Publica Party. In 2003, she was elected to the X Riigikogu.

== Personal life ==
Tomson is married to film director and cinematographer Mati Põldre. From 1965 until 1973, she was married to writer and theatre director Mati Unt.
