= Those Old Love Letters =

1992 film

- Directed by: Mati Põldre
- Written by: Mati Põldre; Alexander Borodyansky; Lilian Põldre
- Produced by: Carl Levoll; Arvo Mihkelson; Teet Taumi
- Starring: Rain Simmul
- Cinematography: Alexander Razumov
- Edited by: Kersti Miilen
- Music by: Tõnis Kõrvits
- Production company: Freyja Film
- Release date: 4 August 1992
- Running time: 127 minutes
- Country: Estonia
- Language: Estonian

Those Old Love Letters (Estonian: Need vanad armastuskirjad) is a 1992 Estonian drama film directed by Mati Põldre. The film was selected as the Estonian entry for the Best Foreign Language Film at the 65th Academy Awards, but was not accepted as a nominee.

== Cast ==
- Rain Simmul as Raimond Valgre
- Liis Tappo as Alice
- Ülle Kaljuste as Emma
- Marika Korolev as Eva
- Kärt Tomingas as Lily
- Lii Tedre as Mother
- Marina Levtova as Niina
- Jaan Rekkor as Muna
- Tõnu Kilgas as Leo
- Andres Lepik as Ants
- Vladimir Laptev as Captain
- Sulev Teppart as Nauding
- Guido Kangur as Kaarel

== See also ==
- List of submissions to the 65th Academy Awards for Best Foreign Language Film
- List of Estonian submissions for the Academy Award for Best Foreign Language Film
