= Agent Wild Duck =

2002 film by Marko Raat

- Estonian: Agent Sinikael
- Directed by: Marko Raat
- Written by: Marko Raat; Andres Maimik
- Produced by: Peeter Urbla; Veiko Õunpuu
- Starring: Mait Malmsten; Kersti Heinloo
- Cinematography: Arko Okk
- Edited by: Raimo Jõerand
- Music by: Janek Murd
- Distributed by: Exitfilm; Suhkur Film
- Release date: 19 September 2002
- Running time: 78 minutes
- Country: Estonia
- Languages: Estonian, English

Agent Wild Duck (Estonian: Agent Sinikael) is a 2002 Estonian action film directed and written by Marko Raat with Andres Maimik. The film premiered on 19 September 2002 in Tallinn and starred Mait Malmsten.

== Cast ==
Mait Malmsten as Agent Hans

- Mait Malmsten as Hans
- Kersti Heinloo as Monika
- Florian Feigl as Florian
- Andrus Vaarik as Raul
- Kaido Veermäe as Solicitor
- Mihkel Smeljanski as Mine's director
- Aleksander Eelmaa as AÜ chairman
- Toomas Suuman as Land-jobber
- Sten Zupping as Land-jobber
- Viire Valdma as Barmaid
- Enn Klooren as Konfident Kapital employee
- Tiit Lilleorg as Konfident Kapital employee
- Tiit Ojasoo as Konfident Kapital employee
- Meelis Salujärv as Konfident Kapital employee
