= Üle rahutu vee =

1951 novel by August Gailit

- Author: August Gailit
- Language: Estonian
- Publication date: 1951
- Publication place: Estonia

Üle rahutu vee (Over Troubled Waters or Over the Restless Sea) is a novel by the Estonian author August Gailit. It was first published in 1951.
