= Jaak Prints =

Estonian actor and footballer

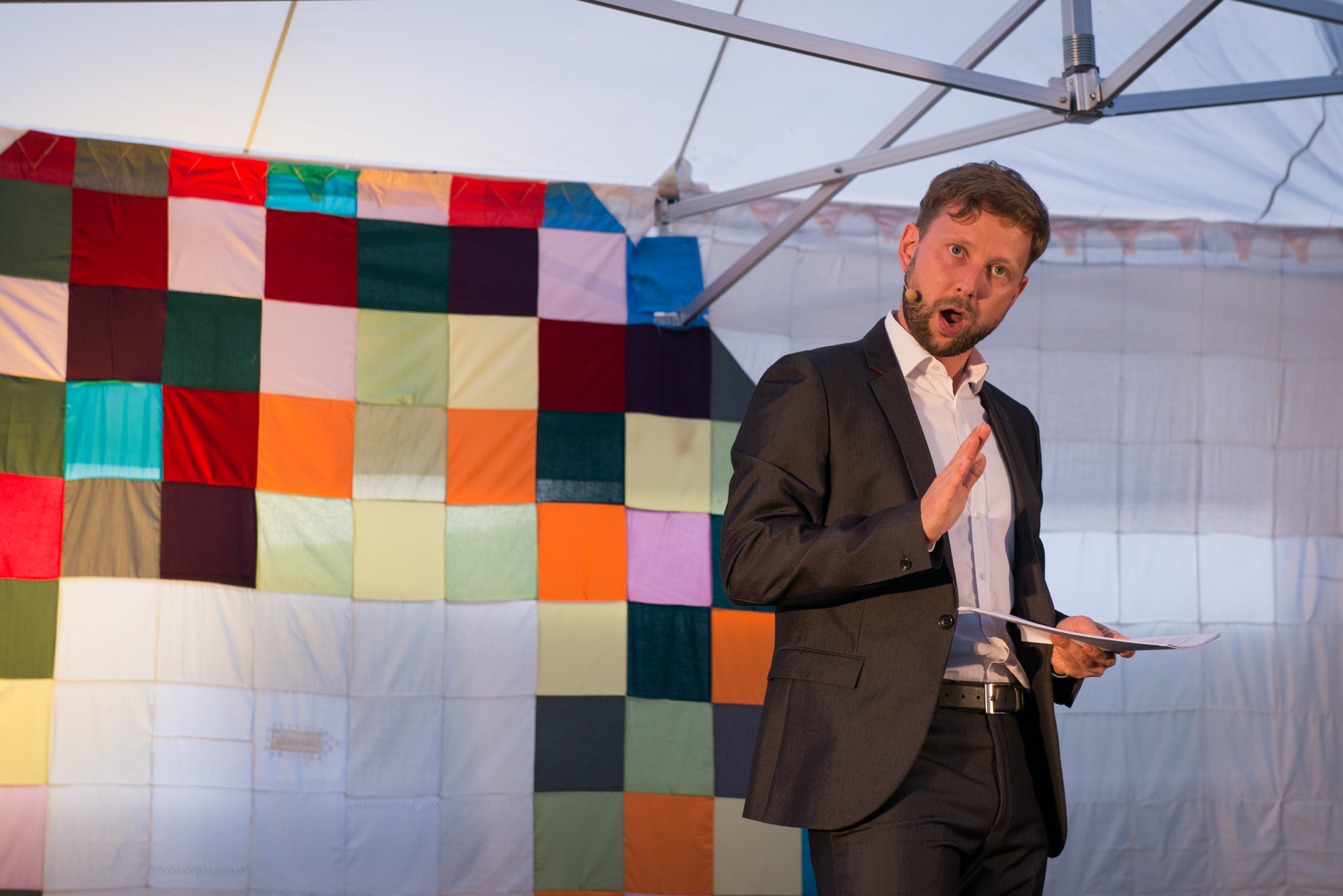
Prints in 2014

Jaak Prints (born Jaak Teppart; 7 May 1981) is an Estonian actor, director, television presenter and former footballer.

Prints was born in Tallinn to actors Sulev Teppart and Anu Lamp. His younger brother Tõnn Lamp is also an actor. In 2004, he graduated from Estonian Academy of Music and Theatre in acting speciality.

2004-2005 he was an actor at Vanemuine Theatre. 2005–2012, he was an actor at Theatre NO99.

He has also been a footballer. His last club was JK Viimsi II. Since 2018, he has been a lecturer and the chief coordinator of the Department of Drama of the Estonian Academy of Music and Theatre.

In 2021, he was awarded with Order of the White Star, IV class.
