= Marko Raat =

Estonian film director (born 1973)

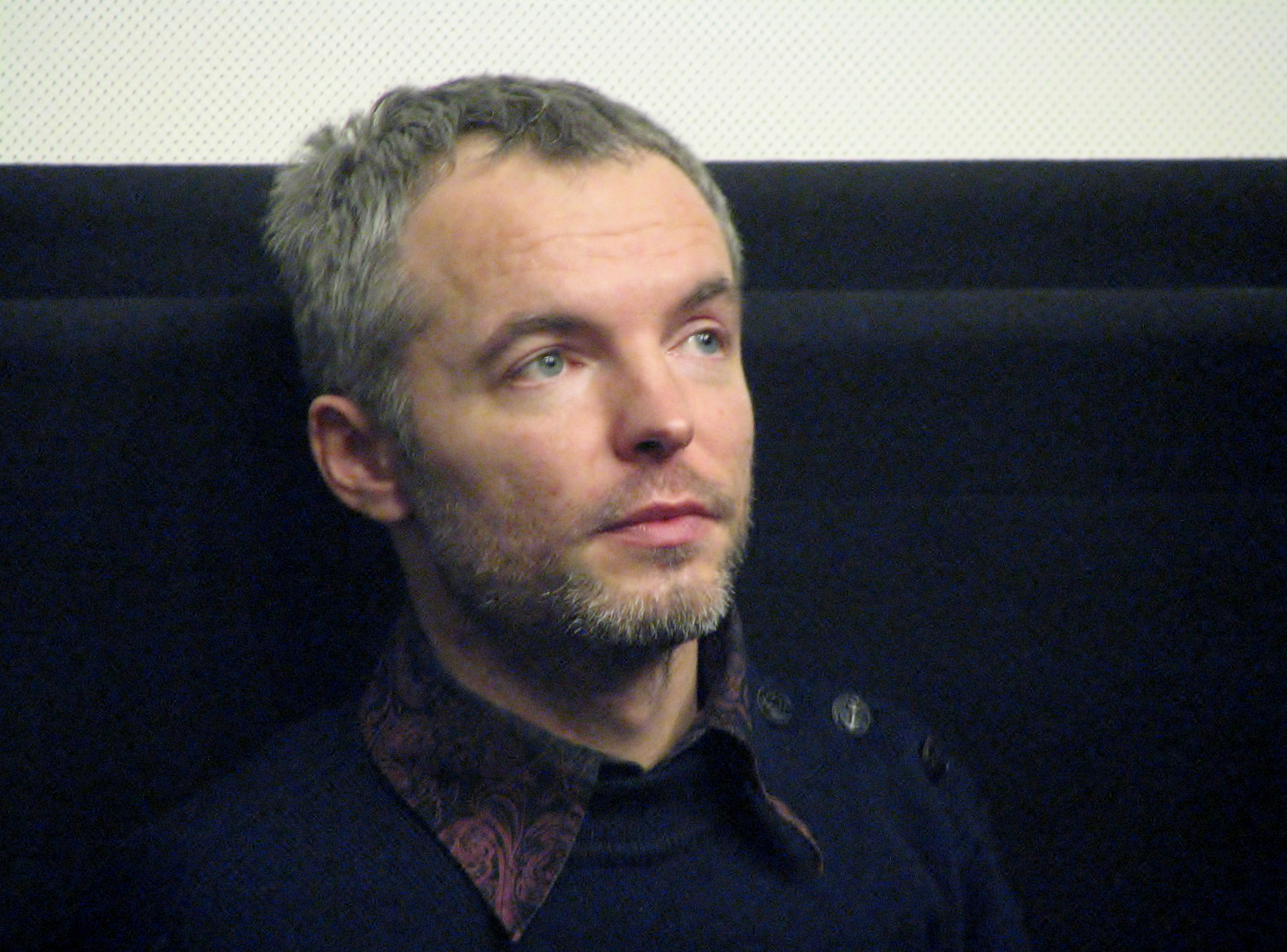
Marko Raat

Marko Raat (born 1 July 1973 in Tallinn) is an Estonian film director, scenarist and cameraman. He has made as author documentaries, full-length features, video art works, directed in theatre and has been involved in several art projects.

== Filmography ==
- 1999: For Aesthetic Reasons (documentary; director, cameraman)
- 2002: Agent Wild Duck (feature film; director, script)
- 2007: Knife (feature film; director, script, cameraman)
- 2008: Toomik's Movie (documentary; director, cameraman)
- 2010: The Snow Queen (feature film; director, script)
- 2015: Fast Eddy's Old News (documentary; director, cameraman)
- 2018: Kitchen Triptych (documentary; director)
- 2019: Funeral Diaries (documentary; director, cameraman)
- 2024: 8 Views of Lake Biwa (feature film; director)
