= Too Tired to Hate =

1995 film directed by Hannes Lintrop and Renita Lintrop

- Estonian: Ma olen väsinud vihkamast
- Directed by: Hannes Lintrop, Renita Lintrop
- Written by: Hannes Lintrop
- Produced by: Hannes Lintrop, Kari Paukkunen
- Starring: Jarl Karjatse, Martin Algus, Helen Kadastik, Marek Pavlov
- Music by: Ivo Vanem, Toomas Vanem
- Production company: Filmistuudio See
- Release date: 1995
- Running time: 90:00
- Country: Estonia
- Language: Estonian

Too Tired to Hate (Estonian: Ma olen väsinud vihkamast) is a 1995 Estonian action film directed by Hannes Lintrop and Renita Lintrop.

== Awards ==
- 1996: Baltic Pearl Film Festival (Riga, Latvia), best debut: Jarl Karjatse.
- 1996: Alexandria International Film Festival (Egypt), special prize by the jury.
- 1996: Carrousel international du film de Rimouski (Canada), Camério award to the best actor: Jarl Karjatse.

== Cast ==
- Jarl Karjatse - Siim
- Martin Algus - Jüri
- Helen Kadastik - Merike
- Marek Pavlov - Juku
