= Laatre =

Borough in Estonia

- Small borough
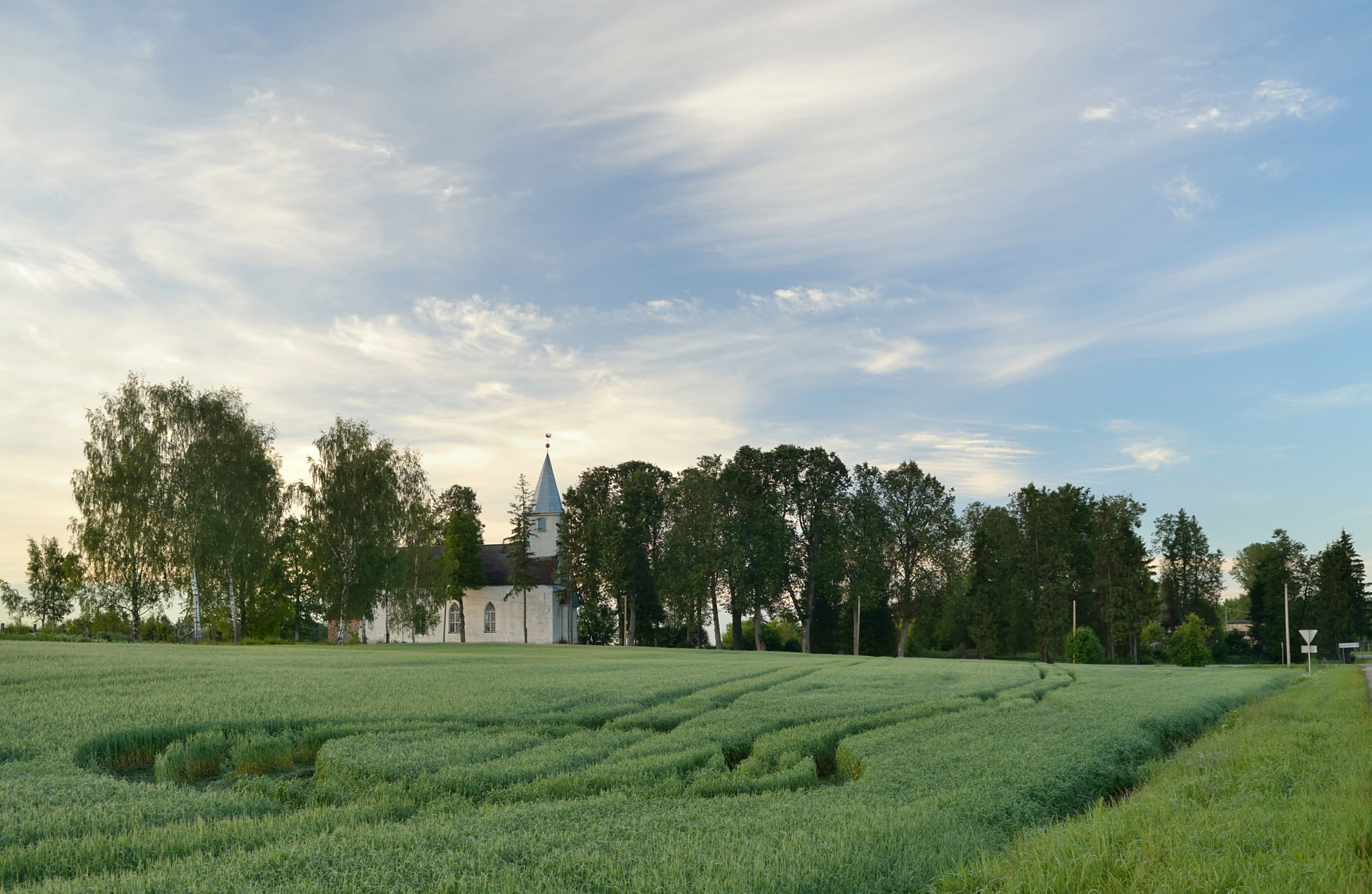

- Location in Estonia
- Coordinates: 57°52′06″N 26°14′54″E
- Country: Estonia
- County: Valga County
- Municipality: Valga Parish
- First mentioned: 1555

Area
  - Total: 2.024 km^{2} (0.781 sq mi)

Population (01.01.2011)
  - Total: 238
  - Density: 118/km^{2} (305/sq mi)

Laatre is a small borough (alevik) in Valga County in southern Estonia, located about 16 km northeast of the town of Valga. Between 1992 and 2017, until the 2017 administrative reform of Estonian local governments, Laatre was the administrative center of Tõlliste Parish. It is now part of Valga Parish. Laatre has a population of 238 (as of 2011) and an area of 2.024 km^{2}.

Laatre Manor (Välek, later Fölck) was first mentioned in 1555. The name Laatre is derived from one of the owners of the manor, the Platers.

There are two churches in Laatre: the Lutheran St. Lawrence's Church (Estonian: Laatre Püha Laurentsiuse kirik) and the Orthodox Laatre Holy Spirit Church (Estonian: Laatre Pühavaimu kirik).

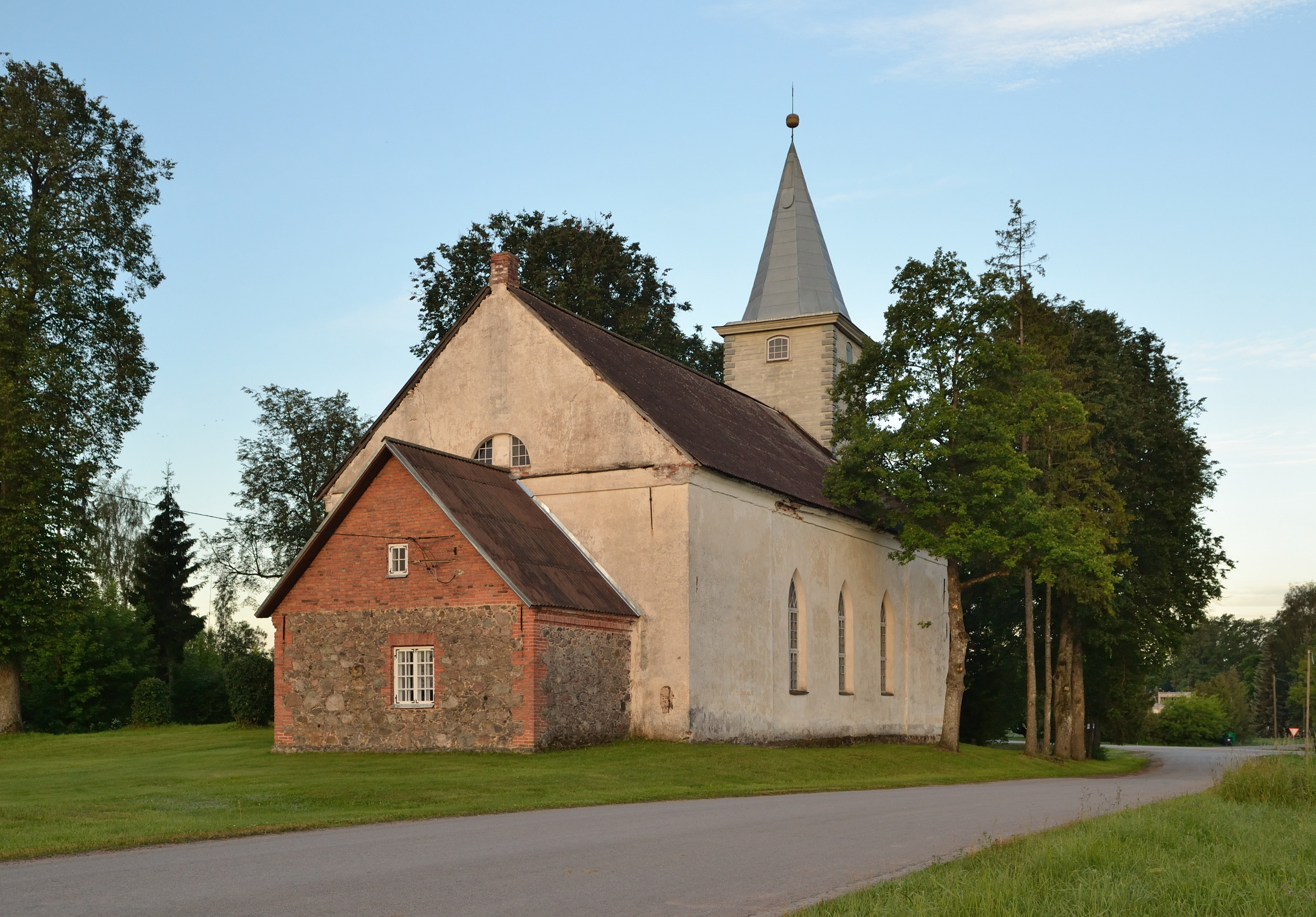
St. Lawrence's Church

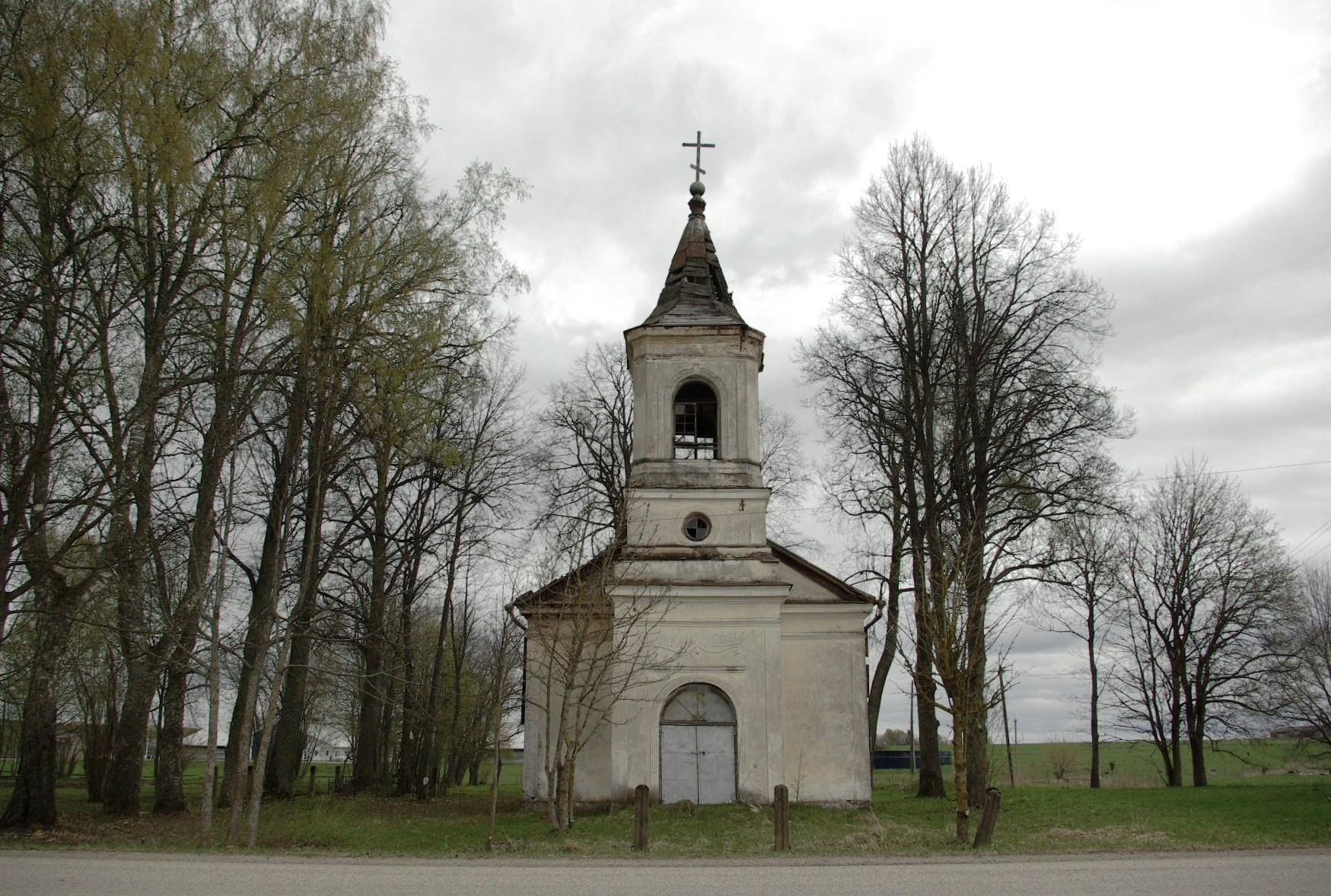
Laatre Holy Spirit Church
