= Mati Põldre =

Estonian film director (1936–2023)

Põldre in 2016

Mati Põldre (23 October 1936 – 7 February 2023) was an Estonian film director, scenarist and operator.

Põldre was born in Tallinn. From 1968 he worked at Eesti Telefilm. During the 1990s he worked at film production company Lege Artis Film.

Põldre was married to journalist, screenwriter and politician Ela Tomson. He died on 7 February 2023, at the age of 86.

== Filmography ==
- 1968: Meie Artur (documentary film; co-director, cinematographer and co-scenarist)
- 1969: Perpetuum mobile (TV short film; director)
- 1969: Mitte üksnes leivast (TV film; co-director)
- 1970: Echoes of the Past (feature film; co-scenarist)
- 1977: Igavesti Teie (TV film; director)
- 1984: Kevad südames (feature film; director and scenarist)
- 1992: Those Old Love Letters (feature film; director and scenarist)
- 2007: Georg (feature film; scenarist)
