= Aimée Beekman =

Estonian writer

- Born: Aimée Malla; 20 April 1933 (age 93); Tallinn, Estonia
- Education: Gerasimov Institute of Cinematography
- Occupation: Writer
- Spouse: Vladimir Beekman
- Writing career
- Language: Estonian
- Years active: since 1956
- Period: Contemporary
- Genres: Novel; children's; play; screenplay; travelogue; translations
- Subject: Modern society
- Notable works: The Mirjam Trilogy; An Opportunity for Choice
- Notable awards: Estonian SSR State Prize; Order of Friendship of Peoples
- Literary movement: Social realism

Aimée Beekman (née Malla; born 20 April 1933) is an Estonian writer noted in her country for several books said to present realistic depictions of modern life. Amongst her works is the controversial Valikuvõimalus (English: An Opportunity for Choice), which involves a woman's unconventional attempt at family life. She is a Merited Writer of the Estonian SSR (1978).

== Personal life ==
Born in Tallinn, she was married to Vladimir Beekman.

== Novels ==
- Väikesed inimesed (1964)
- Kaevupeegel (1966)
- Valgete vareste parv (1967)
- Kartulikuljused (1968)
- Väntorel (1970)
- Keeluala (1971)
- Vanad lapsed (1972)
- Kuradilill (1973)
- Viinakuu (1975)
- Sugupuu (1977)
- Valikuvõimalus (1978)
- Tihnik (1980)
- Vabajooks (1982)
- Loobumisvõimalus (1985)
- Peavari (1989)
- Proovielu (2008)
- Ulavere (2009)
