= Mati Unt =

Estonian writer and theatre director (1944–2005)

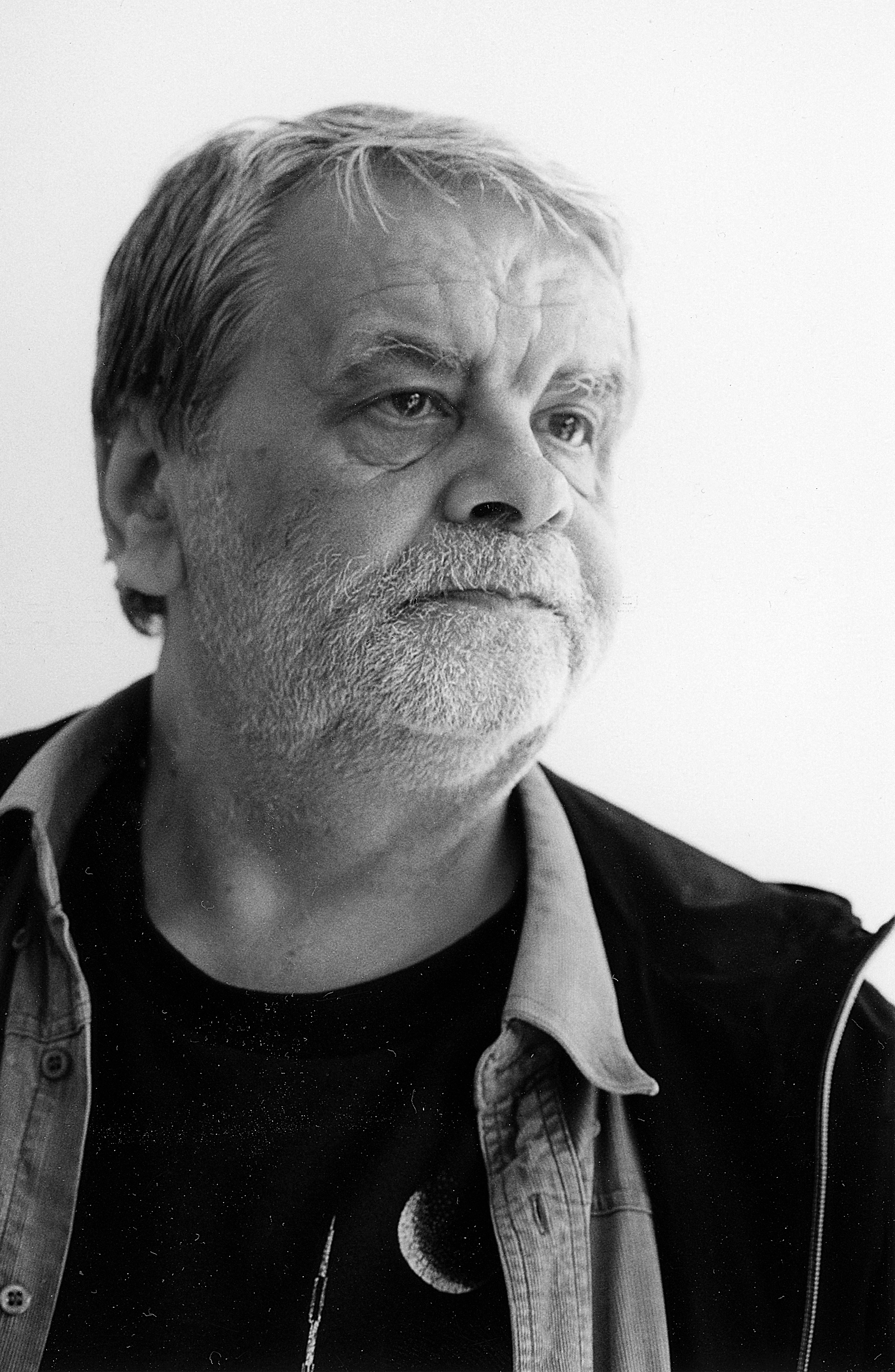
- Unt in 2001
- Born: 1 January 1944; Voore Parish, Estonia
- Died: 22 August 2005 (aged 61); Tallinn, Estonia
- Occupations: Writer; essayist; theatre director
- Known for: Sügisball
- Spouses: Ela Tomson (m. 1965; div. 1973): Lii Unt (his death)
- Partners: Kersti Kreismann

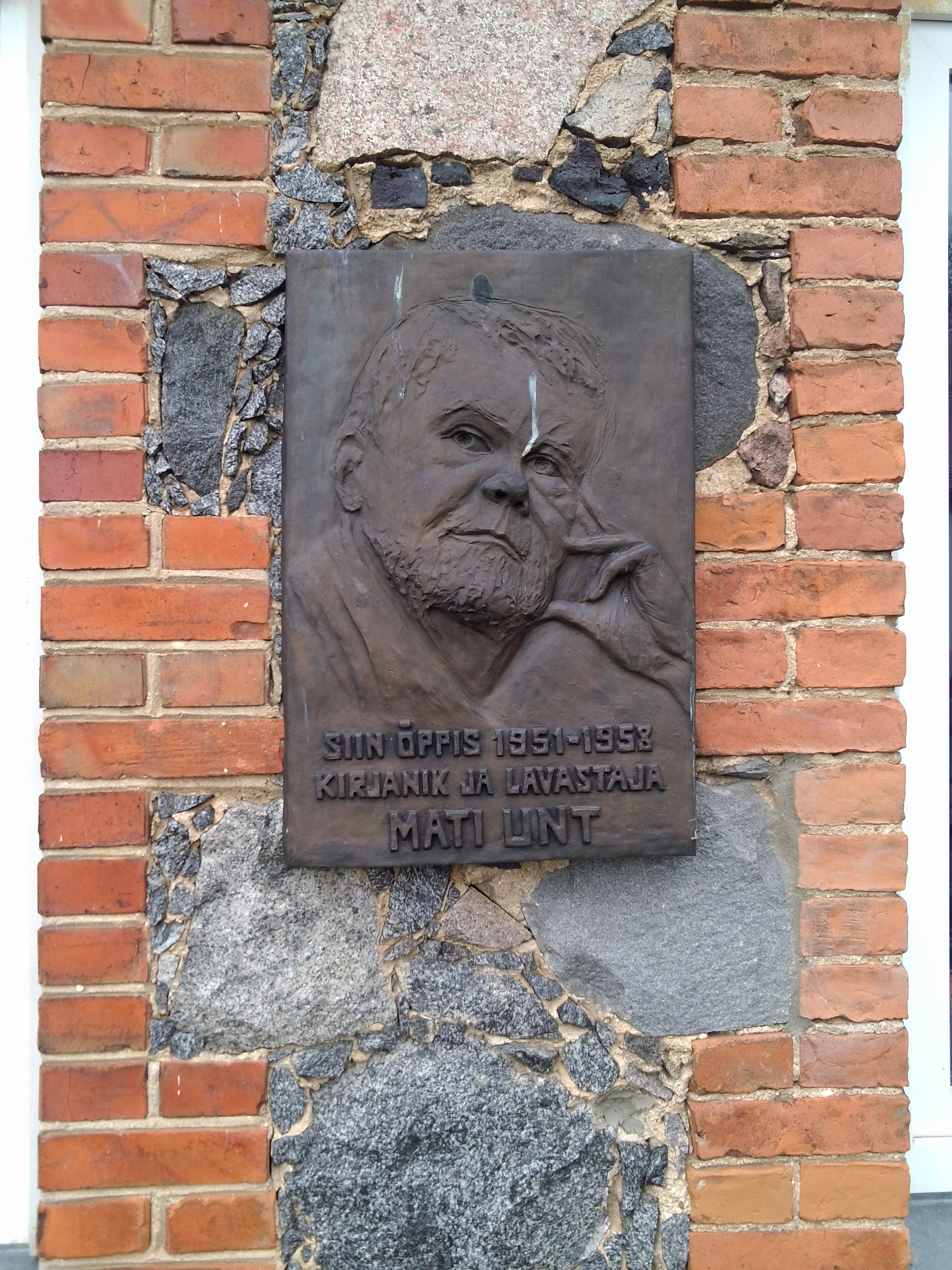
Plaque honoring Unt at his family home in Voore

Mati Unt (1 January 1944 in Linnamäe, Voore Parish [now Voore, Mustvee Parish], Jõgeva County – 22 August 2005 in Tallinn) was an Estonian writer, essayist and theatre director.

== Biography ==
His first novel, written at the age of 18 after having finished high school, was Hüvasti, kollane kass (Goodbye, Yellow Cat). He completed his education in literature, journalism, and philology at the University of Tartu. After that, he served as director of the Vanemuine Theatre from 1966 to 1972, held the same position at the Youth Theatre until 1991, and then at the Estonian Drama Theatre until 2003, when he became a freelance writer.

Unt was married to the television journalist and screenwriter Ela Tomson from 1965, until their divorce in 1973.

He joined the Estonian Writers' Union in 1966. In 1980, he was named an Honoured Writer of the Estonian SSR, and that same year he became one of the signatories to the Letter of 40 intellectuals. In 2000, he was awarded the Order of the White Star.

In 2005, not long before his death, he became a professor of liberal arts at the university. He is buried in Metsakalmistu cemetery in Tallinn.

== Works ==
Four successive novels, Võlg (The Debt, 1964), Elu võimalikkusest kosmoses (On the Possibility of Life in Space, 1967), Kuu nagu kustuv päike (The Moon like the Outgoing Sun, 1971), and Must mootorrattur (The Black Motorcyclist, 1976), established his reputation as a major writer. In addition, he was instrumental in bringing avant-garde theatre to post-Soviet Estonia.

Several of his novels have been adapted for film since his death, including Sügisball ("Autumn Ball") in 2007 by Veiko Õunpuu.

== English translations ==
- Things in the Night (Öös on asju, 1990) Translated by Eric Dickens. Normal, IL: Dalkey Archive Press, 2006. ISBN 978-1-56478-388-2, 1-56478-388-X
- Diary of a Blood Donor (Doonori meelespea, 1990) Translated by Ants Eert. Champaign, IL: Dalkey Archive Press, 2008. ISBN 978-1-56478-496-4
- Brecht at Night (Brecht ilmub öösel, 1996) Translated by Eric Dickens. Champaign, IL: Dalkey Archive Press, 2009. ISBN 978-1-56478-532-9
- "An Empty Beach" ("Tühirand," 1972) in The Dedalus Book of Estonian Literature. Edited by Jan Kaus and translated by Eric Dickens. Sawtry: Dedalus Books, 2011. ISBN 978-1-903517-95-6
