= Vladimir Beekman =

Estonian writer, poet and translator (1929–2009)

- Born: 23 August 1929; Tallinn, Estonia
- Died: 3 October 2009 (aged 80); Tallinn, Estonia
- Resting place: Rahumäe cemetery
- Spouse: Aimée Beekman (née Malla)

Vladimir Beekman (23 August 1929 – 3 October 2009) was an Estonian writer, poet and translator.

== Early life and education ==
After completing his primary education, he attended the Tallinn University of Technology and graduated in 1953 with a degree in chemistry. From 1953 to 1956, he was head of the fiction department at the Estonian State Publishing House, after which he decided to become a freelance writer.

== Career ==
After 1968, he served on the board of the Estonian Writers' Union, rising from Secretary to Chairman, in 1983. He was also involved in politics, being a member of the Presidium of the Supreme Soviet of Estonia and representing Estonia in the Supreme Soviet of the Soviet Union. In 1975, he was named an Honored Writer of the Estonian SSR.

== Personal life ==
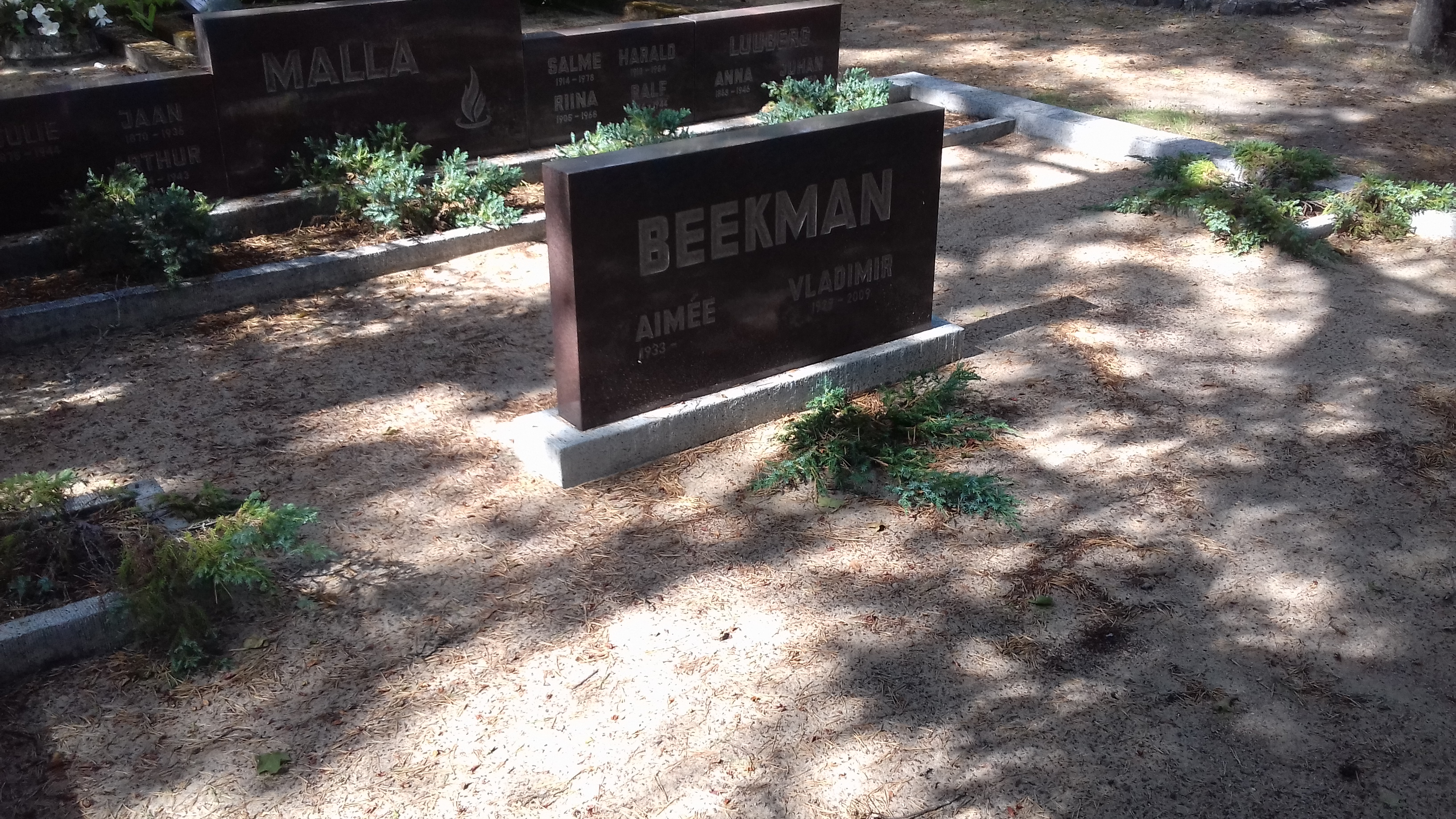
Grave of Vladimir Beekman at Rahumäe Cemetery in Tallinn in 2018

He was married to Aimée Beekman (née Malla), a graduate of the Gerasimov Institute of Cinematography, who was also a successful and widely translated author. They worked together on an important film, Fellow Villagers, that showed some freedom from Soviet control. The plot involved an unsuccessful espionage attempt from a Western country, but it did exhibit some Post-Stalinist freedoms. In particular, it explored the daily problems of fishermen who are portrayed as real people with alternative views which are not cast as either right or wrong.
