= Sulev Teppart =

Estonian actor

Sulev Teppart (born 13 September 1960 in Viljandi) is an Estonian actor.

In 1982 he graduated from the Tallinn State Conservatory's Performing Arts Department. From 1982 until 1985, he worked at the Estonian Youth Theatre, and from 1985 until 2006, at the Estonian Drama Theatre. Since 2006 he has been a freelance actor. Besides theatre roles he has played in films and on television. Teppart was married to actress Anu Lamp. The couple had three sons, including actors Jaak Prints and Tõnn Lamp. They later divorced

== Awards ==
- 1981: Voldemar Panso prize

== Filmography ==
- 1988: Õnnelik lapsepõlv
- 1992: Need vanad armastuskirjad
- 1994: Fallet Paragon (one episode)
- 2003: Pehmed ja karvased
- 2006: Meeletu
- 2007: Kelgukoerad (one episode)
- 2010: Oleg
- 2011: Üks mu sõber
- 2013: Elavad pildid
- 2013: Tuulepealne maa (one episode)
- 2014: Viimane võmm (one episode)
- 2016: Family Lies
- 2016: Perekonnavaled
- 2016-2018: Siberi võmm (2 episodes)
- 2011-2019: Kättemaksukontor (7 episodes)
- 2022: Kalev
