= Enn Vetemaa =

Estonian writer

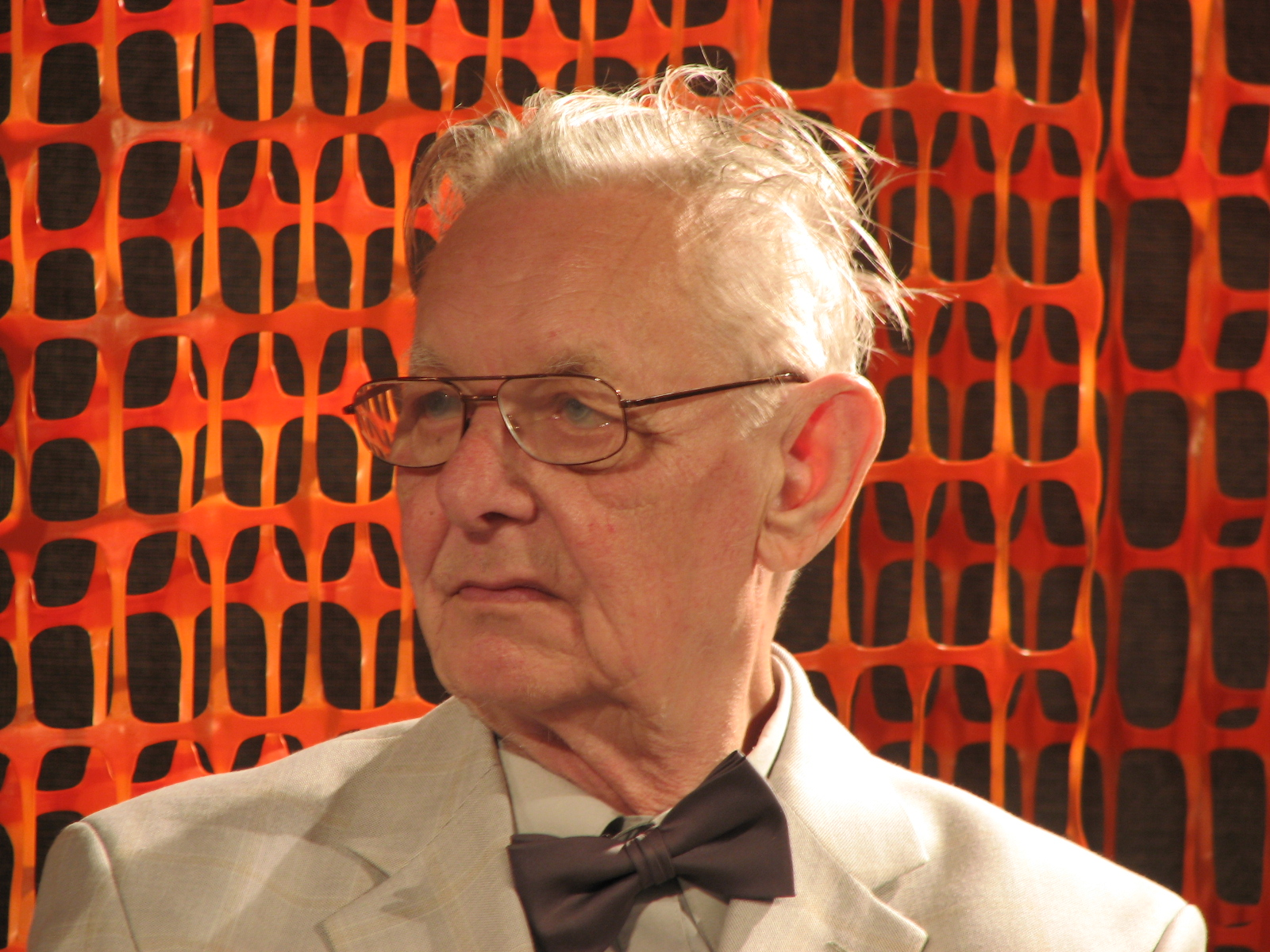
Enn Vetemaa in 2011

Enn Vetemaa (June 20, 1936 – March 28, 2017) was an Estonian writer sometimes referred to as a "forgotten classic", as well as "the unofficial master of the Estonian Modernist short novel".

== Biography ==
Vetemaa was born in Tallinn to the family of an architect. He graduated from Tallinn Polytechnic Institute in 1959 with a degree in chemical engineering. His choice of the subject was influenced by his grandfather, a pioneer photographer and radio-engineer, who started photography in 19th century and experimented with radio-transmitting two years after Alexander Popov.

Without working out the required three years Vetemaa abandoned his engineering career and entered Tallinn Conservatoire that he graduated from in 1965. Despite being a very successful student of music Vetemaa decided that he is not as strong as his classmates: now famous Arvo Pärt and Jaan Rääts. Vetemaa abandoned music and returned to writing poetry.

First publications of Vetemaa's poetry were in 1958. He published books of poetry Critical Age (Russian: Переломный Возраст) in 1962 and Game of snowballs (Russian: Игра в Снежки) in 1966. He became a notable figure among the young poets of Estonia, but his ironic and rational intellect forces to switch into prose.

In 1964 he finished and in 1966 published his arguably most-famous novel Monument. The novel already does something that is unusual in the context of Estonian literature: the narrator is a negative character. In this way Vetemaa makes his readers enter the mind of a character for whom they feel no empathy. The narrator, a young successful sculptor kandidat of architecture Sven Voore, returns from Moscow to Tallinn to work on a memorial to fallen Soviet soldiers. He is supposed to decorate the pedestal for the work of a young talented sculptor Ain Saarema, but the problem is that the monument eventually designed by Ain does not need any pedestals: it shows only arms that the dead soldiers rise from their graves through the ground. The narrator's intrigues eventually lead to the monument eventually finished by a Stalinist Magnus Tee, the narrator getting the job of the pedestal, promotion in the Estonian art unions and the wife of Ain Sarema. The resulting monument is done in the traditions of the socialist realism but has ghostly long arms (inherited from the project of Ain).

The novel was originally forbidden to be published but Vetemaa happened to meet the censor. After a few days of heavy drinking with Vetemaa, the censor found courage to allow the novel for publications. The novel was printed at the climax of the Khrushchev Thaw and was well received. Vetemaa won the USSR Writer's Union prize for the best novel. In 1978 the novel was adapted as a play directed by Valery Fokin in Moscow Sovremennik Theater. It is considered to be the best theater work of Konstantin Raikin.

After Monument Vetemaa published other "small novels": Tiredness (Усталость) (1967), Väike reekviem suupillile (written in 1967, printed in 1968), Munad hiina moodi (English: Chinese Eggs) (written – 1967–1969, printed – 1972). All together Vetemaa wrote ten "short novels"

Vetemaa continues to work as a playwright. His play Õhtusöök viiele (Dinner for Five), first performed in 1972, and the comedy Püha Susanna ehk Meistrite kool (Saint Susanna or the School of Masters), first performed in 1974, demonstrate Vetemaa's sharp eye and witty lines; texts without which Estonian theatre history would not be complete.

In 1983 Vetemaa prepared his most famous text compilation Eesti näkiliste välimäärja (The Reference Book of Estonian Mermaids), which mixes frivolity with popular science. He also wrote a lot of variations on the themes of Estonian epic poetry.

Speaking about the controversy caused by relocation of the Bronze Soldier of Tallinn, Vetemma supported the idea of erecting a monument to Boris Yeltsin on the vacant place. But he would prefer to use that site for a monument to Lennart Meri, the first Estonian president after the dissolution of the Soviet Union.
