= August Gailit =

Estonian writer

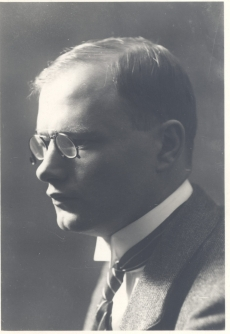
- Born: 9 January 1891; Sangaste Parish (now Otepää Parish), Kreis Dorpat, Governorate of Livonia, Russian Empire
- Died: 5 November 1960 (aged 69); Örebro, Örebro County, Sweden
- Resting place: Forest Cemetery, Tallinn, Estonia
- Occupation: Writer
- Years active: 1916–1960

August Gailit (9 January 1891 – 5 November 1960) was an Estonian writer.

== Life ==
Georg August Gailit was born in Kuiksilla (near Sangaste Castle), Sangaste Parish (now Otepää Parish), Kreis Dorpat, Governorate of Livonia, the son of a carpenter and grew up on a farm in Laatre. From 1899 he attended schools in the parish and the town of Valga from 1905, then from 1907 a municipal school in Tartu. From 1911 until 1914 he worked as a journalist in today's Latvia and Estonia in 1916 until 1918. In the Estonian War of Independence he participated as a war correspondent. From 1922 until 1924 August Gailit lived in Germany, France and Italy. After that he worked as a freelance writer in Tartu and from 1934 in Tallinn. From 1932 until 1934 he was the director of the Theater Vanemuine in Tartu. In 1932, August Gailit married the actress Elvi Vaher-Nander (1898–1981), and his daughter Aili-Viktooria was born in 1933. With the Soviet occupation of Estonia, Gailit fled with his family in September 1944 to Sweden, where he worked as a writer. They settled in the Ormesta manor house near Örebro. He died there on 5 November 1960 and was buried at the Örebro northern cemetery. He was reinterred in Tallinn's Forest Cemetery in 2025.

== Literary career ==
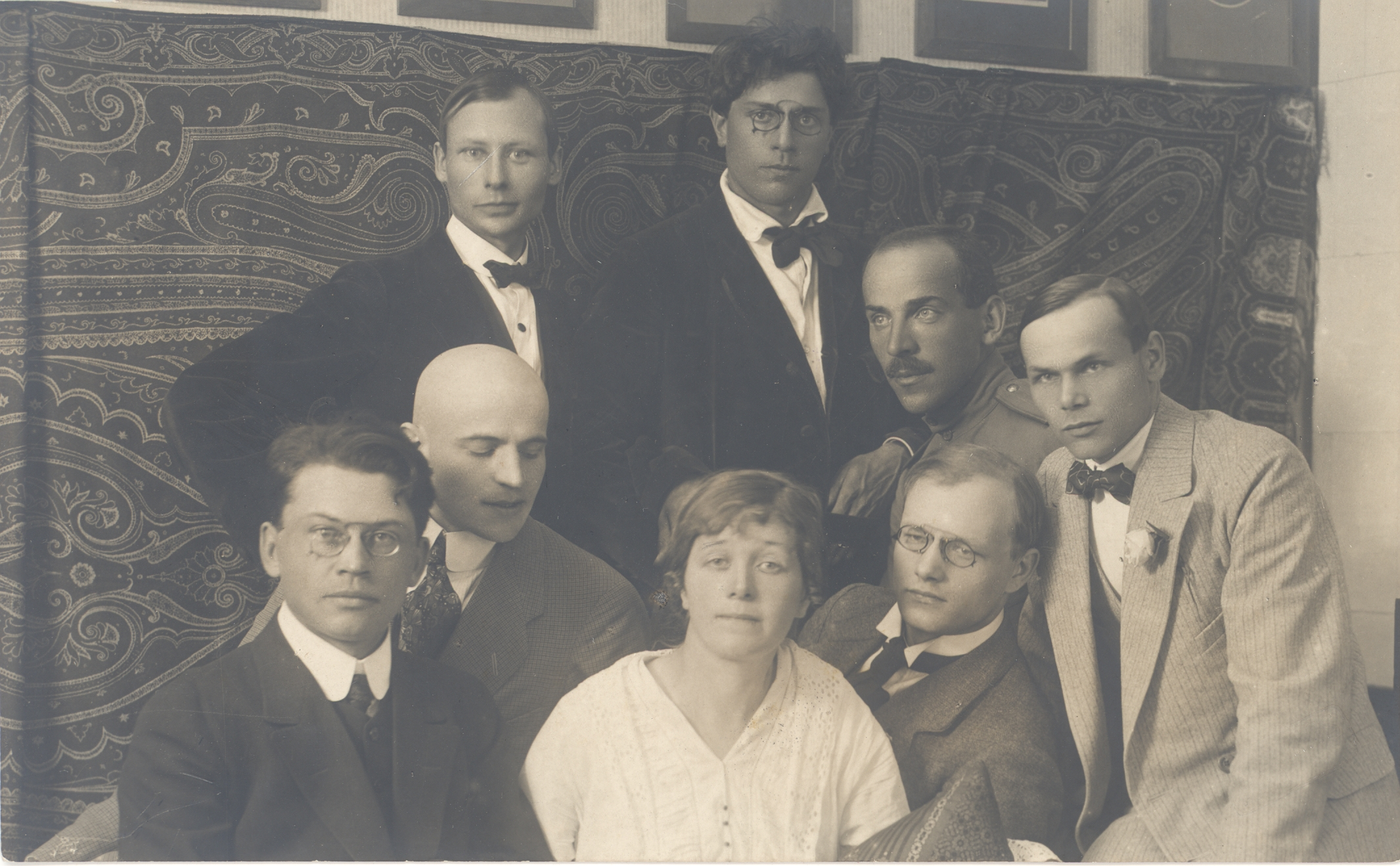
Siuru in 1917

In 1917 August Gailit, along with some other writers and poets, founded a literary group called "Siuru" with which their erotic poems caused some scandal. Members of the group included: Marie Under, Henrik Visnapuu, Johannes Semper, Peet Aren, Friedebert Tuglas and Artur Adson. The early prose of Gailit also contained erotic content and satire. Until the middle of the 1920s Gailit was strongly influenced by neo-romanticism. Oswald Spengler and Knut Hamsun also exerted great influence in his work. His famous novel Toomas Nipernaadi (which was made into a movie in 1983) describes the romantic and adventurous life of a vagabond. Some of his novels covered political issues such as the novel Isade maa (1935) which addressed the subject of the Estonian 1918–20 war of independence. Gailit's novel Üle rahutu vee (published in 1951 in Gothenburg, Sweden) concerns the tragic event of having to leave one's homeland.

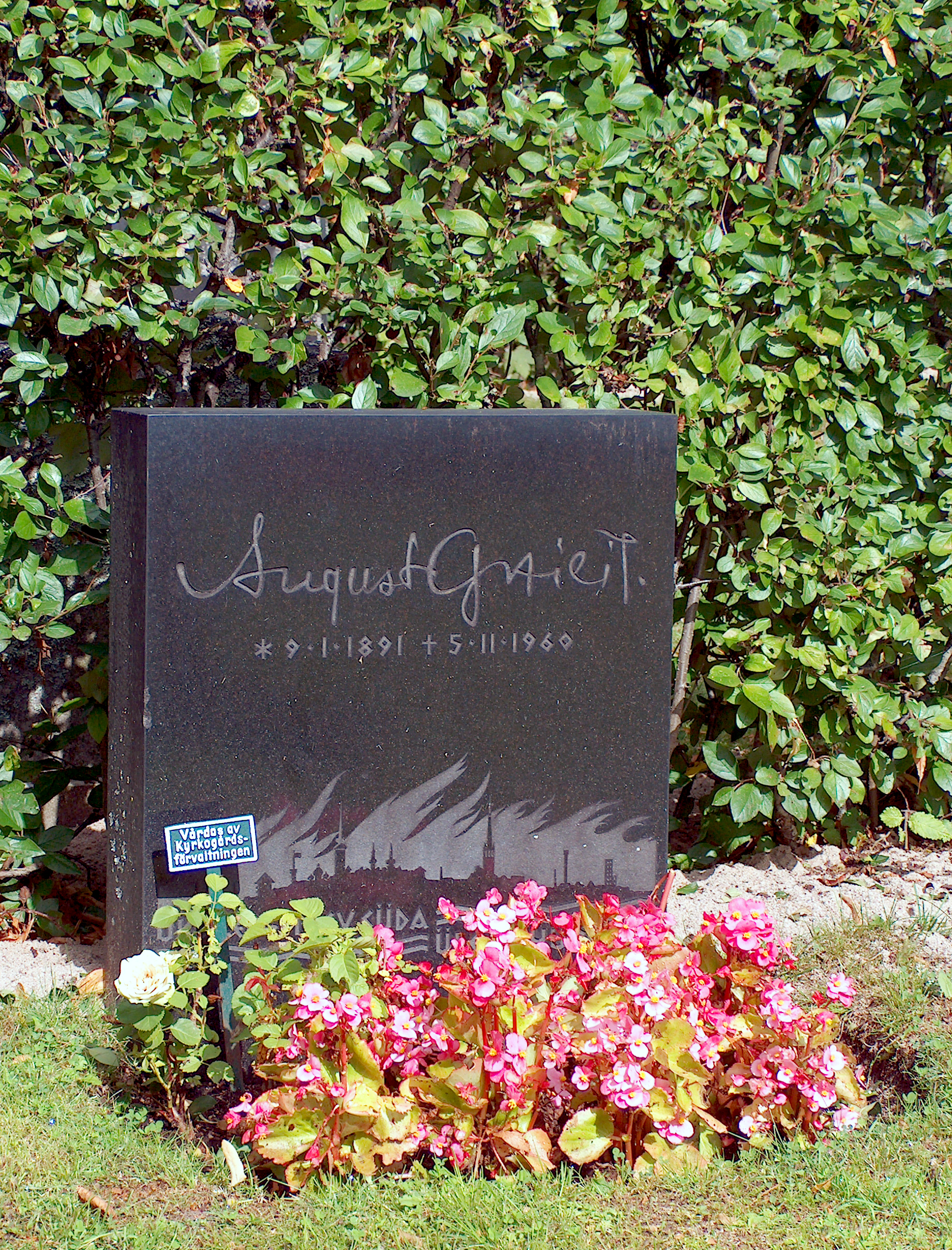
Gailit's grave in Örebro, relocated to Tallinn in 2025

== Selected works ==
- Kui päike läheb looja (tale, 1910)
- Saatana karussell (collection of novels, 1917)
- Muinasmaa (novel, 1918)
- Klounid ja faunid (Serial, 1919)
- Rändavad rüütlid (collection of novels, 1919)
- August Gailiti surm (collection of novels, 1919)
- Purpurne surm (novel, 1924)
- Idioot (collection of novels, 1924)
- Vastu hommikut (collection of novels, 1926)
- Aja grimassid (Serial, 1926)
- Ristisõitjad (collection of novels, 1927)
- Toomas Nipernaadi (novel, 1928)
- Isade maa (novel, 1935)
- Karge meri (novel, 1938)
- Ekke Moor (novel, 1941)
- Leegitsev Süda (novel, 1945)
- Üle rahutu vee (novel, 1951)
- Kas mäletad, mu arm? (prose, 3 volumes, 1951–1959)
