= Andrus Vaarik =

Estonian actor and theater director

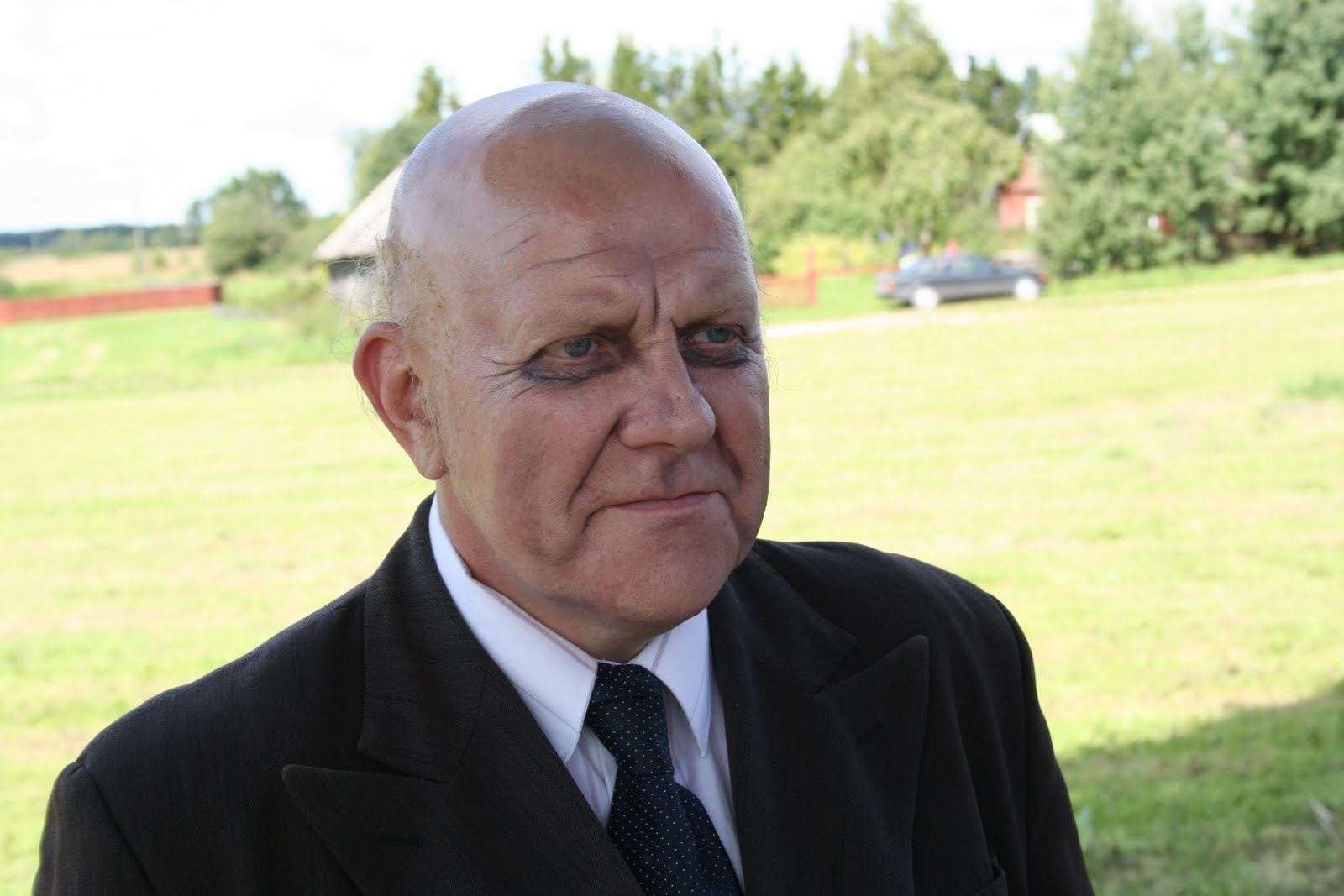
- Vaarik as Ivan Orav
- Born: Andrus Vaarik; 14 May 1958 (age 68); Tallinn, then part of Estonian SSR, Soviet Union
- Education: Estonian Academy of Music and Theatre
- Occupation: Actor
- Known for: Ivan Orav
- Television: Tuulepealne maa
- Children: 1

Andrus Vaarik (born 14 May 1958) is an Estonian film, television, and theater actor and theater director. He is best known for his portrayal of Andrus Kivirähk's fictional character Ivan Orav, Raul in the film Agent Sinikael, Osvald Kallaste in the television miniseries Tuulepealne maa and his work as a stage actor at the Tallinn City Theatre. He is the father of actress Marta Vaarik.

== Awards ==
- 1980: Voldemar Panso Award
- 1988: Ants Lauter Award
- 2000: Union of Estonian Actors Award
- 2001: Order of the White Star, 5th Class
