= Aurelio Herrera =

American boxer

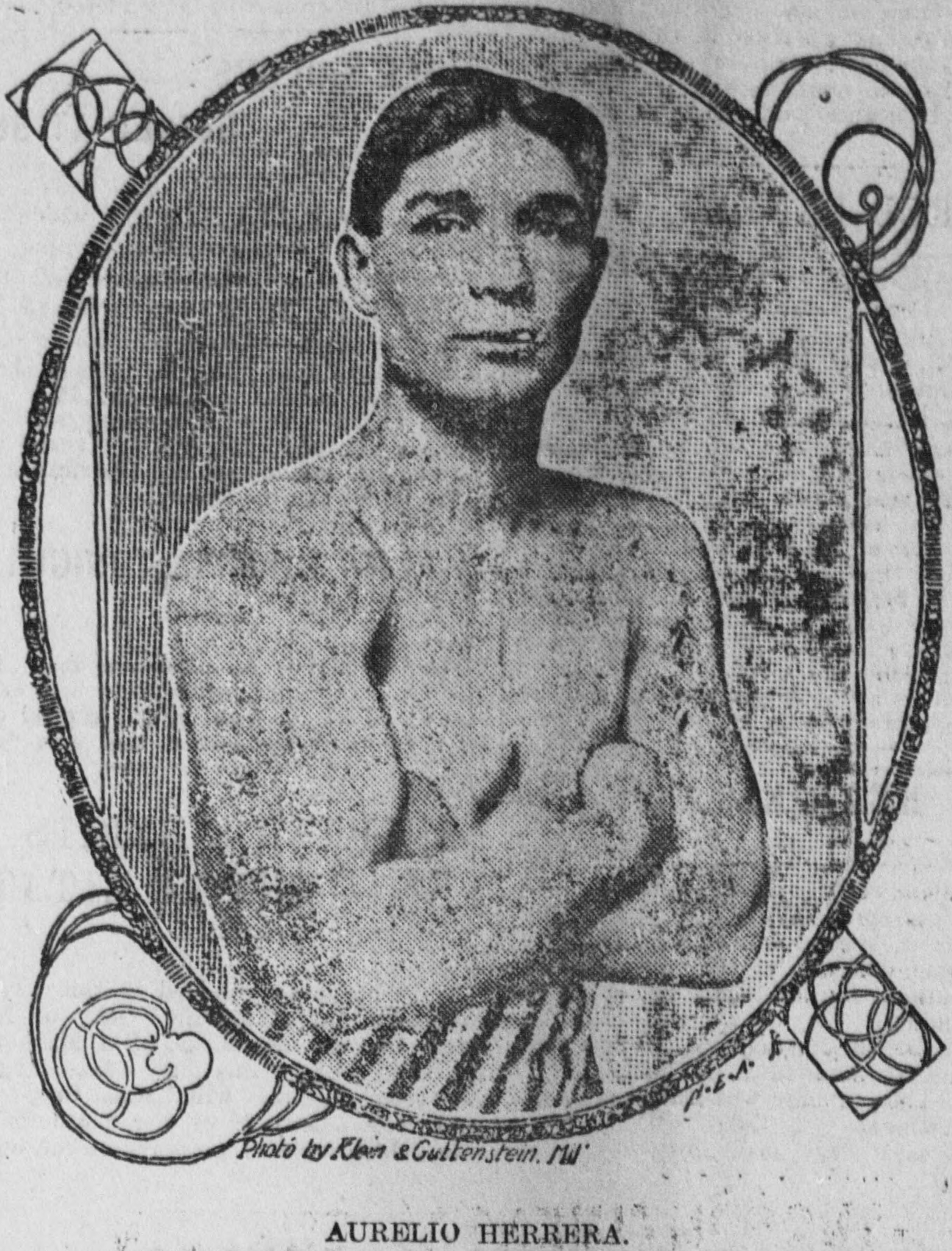

Personal information
- Nicknames: The Mexican Skullcrusher; The Mexican Wildcat
- Nationality: American
- Born: June 14 or June 17, 1876 San Jose, California, U.S.
- Died: April 2, 1927
- Height: 5 ft 4 in (163 cm)
- Weight: Featherweight; Lightweight

Boxing career
- Reach: 63 in (160 cm)
- Stance: Orthodox

Boxing record
- Total fights: 102; with the inclusion of newspaper decisions
- Wins: 70
- Win by KO: 61
- Losses: 14
- Draws: 16
- No contests: 2

Aurelio Herrera (June 14, 1876 – April 12, 1927) was an American professional boxer in the featherweight and lightweight divisions.

Aurelio Herrera is the first famous boxer of Latin American origin. He was known for his aggressive fighting style and strong punch. Two-thirds of his fights were won by knockout. For this reason he was known by his two monikers, the Mexican Skullcrusher and the Mexican Wildcat

He was born in San José to Mexican immigrants. He later moved to Bakersfield with his parents and siblings as a child where he worked harvesting grapes.

== Boxing career ==
After his pro debut in 1895, Herrera amassed a record of 32–0–2 (32KO) and two newspaper decision victories before getting a chance for a world title. On May 29, 1901, in San Francisco, he challenged reigning featherweight champion Terry McGovern. Reports on the fight by The Evening Tribune stated that, "The fight had not progressed one minute of the first round before it became evident to all that McGovern was not making an effort to end the contest, but was content with buffeting Herrera about the ring at his pleasure." By the fifth round, McGovern had thoroughly beaten the challenger to the point that Herrera would not rise from the knockdowns anymore. This defeat was the first defeat of Herrera's professional career. He went on one more significant winning streak before losing to other top contenders. On October 15, 1902, he lost to future featherweight champion Abe Attell in a 15-round decision to decide a contender for the vacant featherweight title. Attell skillfully avoided Herrera's strong blows and went on to win the vacant title the following year. In 1903, Herrera scored notable knockouts against Kid Broad and Eddie Santry. In March 1904, he again lost to Attell on points. On September 5 of the same year in Butte, Montana, he lost a hard-fought 20-round decision against Battling Nelson.

On January 12, 1906, in Los Angeles, Herrera's most notable victory came when he knocked out former featherweight world champion Young Corbett II in the fifth round. He fought a few more fights afterward and ended his career in 1909. Although he made a lot of money as a prizefighter, he squandered his fortune and in 1927 was sentenced to 10 days in jail for vagrancy. He died two months later, two days after the death of Corbett.

Herrera fought a career total of 102 fights, of which he won 68, lost 12, drew 14 and had 2 no contests. In newspaper decisions he held a record of 2–2–1.

=== Fights against Hall of Famers ===
Despite not making it into the International Boxing Hall of Fame himself, Herrera had a total of 6 fights and a record of 1–4–1 (1KO) versus HOF's having lost to Abe Attell (twice), Battling Nelson, and Terry McGovern. He drew against Harry Lewis and defeated Young Corbett II.

== Professional boxing record ==
All information in this section is derived from BoxRec, unless otherwise stated.

=== Official record ===
102 fights	68 wins	12 losses
By knockout	61	4
By decision	7	8
Draws	15	
No contests	2	
Newspaper decisions/draws	5	

All newspaper decisions are officially regarded as “no decision” bouts and are not counted to the win/loss/draw column.

No.	Result	Record	Opponent	Type	Round	Date	Location	Notes
102	Loss	68–12–15 (7)	Dick Hyland	KO	6 (10)	Sep 23, 1909	Scribner Opera House, Bakersfield, California, U.S.	
101	Loss	68–11–15 (7)	Willie Fitzgerald	PTS	12	May 12, 1908	Armory A.A., Boston, Massachusetts, U.S.	
100	Win	68–10–15 (7)	Kid Goodman	PTS	15	Sep 18, 1906	Chelsea, Michigan, U.S.	
99	Loss	67–10–15 (7)	Charles Neary	TKO	7 (10)	Aug 17, 1906	Schlitz Park, Milwaukee, Wisconsin, U.S.	
98	Draw	67–9–15 (7)	Kid Herman	PTS	20	Feb 9, 1906	Pacific A.C., Los Angeles, California, U.S.	
97	Win	67–9–14 (7)	Young Corbett II	KO	5 (20)	Jan 12, 1906	Pacific A.C., Los Angeles, California, U.S.	
96	Draw	66–9–14 (7)	Eddie Hanlon	PTS	20	Nov 10, 1905	Naud Junction, Los Angeles, California, U.S.	
95	Draw	66–9–13 (7)	Kid Winters	PTS	15	Jul 24, 1905	Bakersfield, California, U.S.	
94	NC	66–9–12 (7)	Charles Neary	NC	1 (10)	Jul 4, 1905	Butte, Montana, U.S.	
93	Draw	66–9–12 (6)	Charles Neary	PTS	10	Jun 8, 1905	Powers' Opera House, Grand Rapids, Michigan, U.S.	
92	Win	66–9–11 (6)	Kid Goodman	PTS	15	May 17, 1905	Douglas A.C., Chelsea, Massachusetts, U.S.	
91	Draw	65–9–11 (6)	Harry Lewis	NWS	6	May 6, 1905	National A.C., Philadelphia, Pennsylvania, U.S.	
90	Win	65–9–11 (5)	Tommy Daly	PTS	15	Apr 21, 1905	4th Regiment Armory, Baltimore, Maryland, U.S.	
89	Loss	64–9–11 (5)	Young Erne	NWS	6	Apr 15, 1905	National A.C., Philadelphia, Pennsylvania, U.S.	
88	Draw	64–9–11 (4)	Tommy Daly	PTS	10	Mar 16, 1905	New Orleans, Louisiana, U.S.	
87	Draw	64–9–10 (4)	Maurice Sayers	PTS	6	Jan 20, 1905	Milwaukee A.C., Milwaukee, Wisconsin, U.S.	
86	Draw	64–9–9 (4)	Maurice Sayers	PTS	6	Dec 23, 1904	Milwaukee Boxing Club, Milwaukee, Wisconsin, U.S.	
85	ND	64–9–8 (4)	Young Herman	ND	4	Oct 26, 1904	Ogden, Utah, U.S.	
84	Win	64–9–8 (3)	Kid Tracy	KO	5 (10)	Oct 7, 1904	Helena, Montana, U.S.	
83	Loss	63–9–8 (3)	Battling Nelson	PTS	20	Sep 5, 1904	Montana A.C., Butte, Montana, U.S.	
82	Win	63–8–8 (3)	Benny Yanger	KO	8 (10)	Jun 13, 1904	Broadway Theater, Butte, Montana, U.S.	
81	Win	62–8–8 (3)	Kid Goodman	PTS	20	May 17, 1904	Saint Louis, Missouri, U.S.	
80	Win	61–8–8 (3)	Louie Long	PTS	20	May 11, 1904	Broadway Theater, Butte, Montana, U.S.	
79	Loss	60–8–8 (3)	Kid Goodman	NWS	20	Apr 21, 1904	Saint Louis, Missouri, U.S.	
78	Win	60–8–8 (2)	Kid Farmer	KO	1 (10)	Apr 14, 1904	Chicago, Illinois, U.S.	
77	Loss	59–8–8 (2)	Abe Attell	PTS	6	Mar 28, 1904	American A.C., Chicago, Illinois, U.S.	
76	Win	59–7–8 (2)	Barney Abel	KO	3 (10)	Mar 25, 1904	Battery D Armory, Chicago, Illinois, U.S.	
75	Draw	58–7–8 (2)	Benny Yanger	PTS	6	Mar 14, 1904	American A.C., Chicago, Illinois, U.S.	
74	Loss	58–7–7 (2)	Louie Long	TKO	4 (20)	Feb 12, 1904	Margaret Theatre, Anaconda, Montana, U.S.	
73	Draw	58–6–7 (2)	Charles Neary	PTS	6	Jan 22, 1904	Milwaukee Boxing Club, Milwaukee, Wisconsin, U.S.	
72	Draw	58–6–6 (2)	Charles Neary	PTS	6	Jan 8, 1904	Panorama Building, Milwaukee, Wisconsin, U.S.	
71	Loss	58–6–5 (2)	Jack Cordell	PTS	15	Nov 17, 1903	Reliance A.C., Oakland, California, U.S.	
70	Win	58–5–5 (2)	Eddie Santry	KO	13 (20)	Oct 29, 1903	Margaret Theatre, Anaconda, Montana, U.S.	
69	Draw	57–5–5 (2)	Louie Long	PTS	20	Oct 15, 1903	Vancouver, British Columbia, Canada	
68	Win	57–5–4 (2)	Jack Downey	KO	1 (10)	Jul 2, 1903	Salt Lake City, Utah, U.S.	
67	Win	56–5–4 (2)	Kid Broad	KO	4 (10)	Jun 13, 1903	Broadway Theater, Butte, Montana, U.S.	
66	Win	55–5–4 (2)	Jack Richards	KO	4 (10)	May 16, 1903	Butte, Montana, U.S.	
65	Win	54–5–4 (2)	Cyclone Jackson	KO	2 (10)	May 13, 1903	Butte, Montana, U.S.	
64	Win	53–5–4 (2)	Kid Fredericks	KO	3 (20)	May 8, 1903	Broadway Theater, Butte, Montana, U.S.	
63	Win	52–5–4 (2)	Jack Richards	KO	4 (20)	Apr 16, 1903	Butte, Montana, U.S.	
62	Win	51–5–4 (2)	Cyclone Johnson	KO	1 (?)	Apr 14, 1903	Basin, Montana, U.S.	
61	Win	50–5–4 (2)	Jack Clifford	KO	9 (10)	Mar 16, 1903	Broadway Theater, Butte, Montana, U.S.	
60	Win	49–5–4 (2)	Tommy Jacobs	KO	3 (20)	Feb 23, 1903	Salt Lake City, Utah, U.S.	
59	Win	48–5–4 (2)	Jack Madden	TKO	14 (15)	Feb 19, 1903	Great Falls, Montana, U.S.	
58	Win	47–5–4 (2)	Wisconsin Kid	KO	2 (10)	Feb 16, 1903	Tivoli Theater, Lewistown, Montana, U.S.	
57	Win	46–5–4 (2)	Jack Kingsley	KO	4 (10)	Feb 13, 1903	Butte, Montana, U.S.	
56	Win	45–5–4 (2)	Kid Oglesby	RTD	10 (20)	Feb 5, 1903	Grand Theatre, Butte, Montana, U.S.	
55	Win	44–5–4 (2)	George Baker	PTS	20	Dec 17, 1902	Fresno, California, U.S.	
54	Win	43–5–4 (2)	Caesar Attell	KO	2 (?)	Nov 21, 1902	Point Richmond, California, U.S.	
53	Win	42–5–4 (2)	Tommy Herman	KO	12 (12)	Nov 15, 1902	Richmond, California, U.S.	
52	Win	41–5–4 (2)	Caesar Attell	KO	3 (10)	Nov 2, 1902	Oakland, California, U.S.	
51	Loss	40–5–4 (2)	Abe Attell	PTS	15	Oct 15, 1902	Exposition Building, Oakland, California, U.S.	
50	Win	40–4–4 (2)	Mike Duffy	KO	8 (10)	Oct 3, 1902	Oakland, California, U.S.	
49	Win	39–4–4 (2)	Young Dempsey	KO	5 (10)	Sep 19, 1902	Bakersfield, California, U.S.	
48	Win	38–4–4 (2)	Jack Lowery	KO	7 (10)	Aug 7, 1902	Bakersfield, California, U.S.	
47	Win	37–4–4 (2)	Kid Johnson	KO	4 (10)	May 10, 1902	Bakersfield, California, U.S.	
46	Draw	36–4–4 (2)	Tim Hegarty	PTS	20	Mar 18, 1902	Scribner Opera House, Bakersfield, California, U.S.	
45	Win	36–4–3 (2)	Kid Chambers	KO	3 (10)	Mar 3, 1902	Fresno, California, U.S.	
44	Win	35–4–3 (2)	Billy Wilson	KO	5 (10)	Feb 10, 1902	Madera, California, U.S.	
43	Loss	34–4–3 (2)	Tim Hegarty	PTS	20	Jan 27, 1902	Scribner Opera House, Bakersfield, California, U.S.	
42	Win	34–3–3 (2)	George Baker	PTS	10	Dec 17, 1901	Fresno, California, U.S.	
41	Win	33–3–3 (2)	Tommy Mowatt	KO	3 (10)	Sep 25, 1901	Avon Theater, Madera, California, U.S.	
40	Draw	32–3–3 (2)	Tim Hegarty	PTS	20	Sep 5, 1901	Bakersfield, California, U.S.	
39	Loss	32–3–2 (2)	Billy DeCoursey	PTS	20	Sep 3, 1901	Hazard's Pavilion, Los Angeles, California, U.S.	
38	Loss	32–2–2 (2)	Tim Hegarty	PTS	20	Jul 15, 1901	Bakersfield, California, U.S.	
37	Loss	32–1–2 (2)	Terry McGovern	KO	5 (20)	May 29, 1901	Mechanic's Pavilion, San Francisco, California, U.S.	For world featherweight title
36	Win	32–0–2 (2)	Toby Irwin	KO	8 (20)	Apr 19, 1901	Scribner Opera House, Bakersfield, California, U.S.	
35	Win	31–0–2 (2)	Tommy Cox	KO	8 (10)	Dec 8, 1900	Bakersfield, California, U.S.	
34	Draw	30–0–2 (2)	Bob Thompson	PTS	10	Dec 3, 1900	Bakersfield, California, U.S.	
33	Win	30–0–1 (2)	Harry Jones	KO	3 (10)	Nov 21, 1900	Bakersfield, California, U.S.	
32	Win	29–0–1 (2)	Harry Jones	KO	10 (?)	Sep 22, 1900	San Francisco, California, U.S.	
31	Win	28–0–1 (2)	Gypsy Kid	KO	7 (10)	Aug 20, 1900	Bakersfield, California, U.S.	
30	Win	27–0–1 (2)	Australian Jim Ryan	KO	3 (10)	Jun 12, 1900	Bakersfield, California, U.S.	
29	Win	26–0–1 (2)	Crocky Boyle	KO	10 (10)	Mar 14, 1900	Woodward's Pavilion, San Francisco, California, U.S.	
28	Win	25–0–1 (2)	Watermelon Kid	KO	2 (10)	Feb 26, 1900	Bakersfield, California, U.S.	
27	Draw	24–0–1 (2)	Tom Sullivan	PTS	6	Feb 11, 1900	Bakersfield, California, U.S.	
26	Win	24–0 (2)	Joe Spider Welsh	KO	7 (?)	Feb 2, 1900	Los Angeles, California, U.S.	
25	Win	23–0 (2)	Charley Tod	KO	7 (10)	Jan 15, 1900	Bakersfield, California, U.S.	
24	Win	22–0 (2)	Kid Chambers	KO	3 (10)	Dec 27, 1899	Randsburg, California, U.S.	
23	Win	21–0 (2)	Elmer Reader	KO	3 (10)	Nov 3, 1899	Randsburg, California, U.S.	
22	Win	20–0 (2)	Pat Daly	KO	14 (15)	Oct 12, 1899	Bakersfield, California, U.S.	
21	Win	19–0 (2)	Kid Remphery	KO	4 (10)	Sep 12, 1899	Bakersfield, California, U.S.	
20	Win	18–0 (2)	Billy DeCoursey	TKO	15 (20)	Aug 21, 1899	Southern California A.C., Los Angeles, California, U.S.	
19	Win	17–0 (2)	Pat Daly	KO	7 (10)	Aug 10, 1899	Bakersfield, California, U.S.	
18	Win	16–0 (2)	Jim Barry	KO	6 (?)	Jun 12, 1899	California, U.S.	
17	Win	15–0 (2)	Biddy Bishop	KO	3 (20)	May 29, 1899	Scribner Opera House, Bakersfield, California, U.S.	
16	Win	14–0 (2)	Mike Thornton	KO	6 (10)	Feb 22, 1899	Los Angeles, California, U.S.	
15	Win	13–0 (2)	Joe Spider Welsh	KO	9 (10)	Jan 17, 1899	Los Angeles, California, U.S.	
14	Win	12–0 (2)	Jack Huston	KO	7 (10)	Nov 25, 1898	Old Athletic Hall, Bakersfield, California, U.S.	
13	Win	11–0 (2)	Jack Norman	KO	6 (6)	Aug 12, 1898	Bakersfield, California, U.S.	
12	Win	10–0 (2)	Dave Hatch	KO	7 (?)	Aug 7, 1898	California, U.S.	
11	Win	9–0 (2)	Jack McCormick	KO	4 (6)	Jun 7, 1898	Bakersfield, California, U.S.	
10	Win	8–0 (2)	Gypsy Kid	KO	3 (?)	Jan 14, 1898	California, U.S.	
9	Win	7–0 (2)	Wilson	KO	3 (?)	Nov 25, 1897	Randsburg, California, U.S.	
8	Win	6–0 (2)	Fresno Kid	KO	1 (?)	Nov 2, 1897	California, U.S.	
7	Win	5–0 (2)	Charlie Fook	KO	15 (?)	Aug 23, 1897	California, U.S.	
6	Win	4–0 (2)	Pat Daly	KO	3 (?)	Jun 19, 1897	California, U.S.	
5	Win	3–0 (2)	Mike Thornton	NWS	6	Oct 30, 1896	Bakersfield A.C., Bakersfield, California, U.S.	
4	Win	3–0 (1)	Joe Welch	RTD	9 (15)	Aug 14, 1896	Bakersfield A.C., Bakersfield, California, U.S.	
3	Win	2–0 (1)	Joe Welch	NWS	4	Jul 24, 1896	Bakersfield A.C., Bakersfield, California, U.S.	
2	Win	2–0	Charles Todd	KO	3 (?)	Oct 14, 1895	Bakersfield A.C., Bakersfield, California, U.S.	
1	Win	1–0	Woo Sing	KO	? (20)	Aug 25, 1893	Bakersfield, California, U.S.	

=== Unofficial record ===
102 fights	70 wins	14 losses
By knockout	61	4
By decision	9	10
Draws	16	
No contests	2	

Record with the inclusion of newspaper decisions to the win/loss/draw column.

No.	Result	Record	Opponent	Type	Round	Date	Location	Notes
102	Loss	70–14–16 (2)	Dick Hyland	KO	6 (10)	Sep 23, 1909	Scribner Opera House, Bakersfield, California, U.S.	
101	Loss	70–13–16 (2)	Willie Fitzgerald	PTS	12	May 12, 1908	Armory A.A., Boston, Massachusetts, U.S.	
100	Win	70–12–16 (2)	Kid Goodman	PTS	15	Sep 18, 1906	Chelsea, Michigan, U.S.	
99	Loss	69–12–16 (2)	Charles Neary	TKO	7 (10)	Aug 17, 1906	Schlitz Park, Milwaukee, Wisconsin, U.S.	
98	Draw	69–11–16 (2)	Kid Herman	PTS	20	Feb 9, 1906	Pacific A.C., Los Angeles, California, U.S.	
97	Win	69–11–15 (2)	Young Corbett II	KO	5 (20)	Jan 12, 1906	Pacific A.C., Los Angeles, California, U.S.	
96	Draw	68–11–15 (2)	Eddie Hanlon	PTS	20	Nov 10, 1905	Naud Junction, Los Angeles, California, U.S.	
95	Draw	68–11–14 (2)	Kid Winters	PTS	15	Jul 24, 1905	Bakersfield, California, U.S.	
94	NC	68–11–13 (2)	Charles Neary	NC	1 (10)	Jul 4, 1905	Butte, Montana, U.S.	
93	Draw	68–11–13 (1)	Charles Neary	PTS	10	Jun 8, 1905	Powers' Opera House, Grand Rapids, Michigan, U.S.	
92	Win	68–11–12 (1)	Kid Goodman	PTS	15	May 17, 1905	Douglas A.C., Chelsea, Massachusetts, U.S.	
91	Draw	67–11–12 (1)	Harry Lewis	NWS	6	May 6, 1905	National A.C., Philadelphia, Pennsylvania, U.S.	
90	Win	67–11–11 (1)	Tommy Daly	PTS	15	Apr 21, 1905	4th Regiment Armory, Baltimore, Maryland, U.S.	
89	Loss	66–11–11 (1)	Young Erne	NWS	6	Apr 15, 1905	National A.C., Philadelphia, Pennsylvania, U.S.	
88	Draw	66–10–11 (1)	Tommy Daly	PTS	10	Mar 16, 1905	New Orleans, Louisiana, U.S.	
87	Draw	66–10–10 (1)	Maurice Sayers	PTS	6	Jan 20, 1905	Milwaukee A.C., Milwaukee, Wisconsin, U.S.	
86	Draw	66–10–9 (1)	Maurice Sayers	PTS	6	Dec 23, 1904	Milwaukee Boxing Club, Milwaukee, Wisconsin, U.S.	
85	ND	66–10–8 (1)	Young Herman	ND	4	Oct 26, 1904	Ogden, Utah, U.S.	
84	Win	66–10–8	Kid Tracy	KO	5 (10)	Oct 7, 1904	Helena, Montana, U.S.	
83	Loss	65–10–8	Battling Nelson	PTS	20	Sep 5, 1904	Montana A.C., Butte, Montana, U.S.	
82	Win	65–9–8	Benny Yanger	KO	8 (10)	Jun 13, 1904	Broadway Theater, Butte, Montana, U.S.	
81	Win	64–9–8	Kid Goodman	PTS	20	May 17, 1904	Saint Louis, Missouri, U.S.	
80	Win	63–9–8	Louie Long	PTS	20	May 11, 1904	Broadway Theater, Butte, Montana, U.S.	
79	Loss	62–9–8	Kid Goodman	NWS	20	Apr 21, 1904	Saint Louis, Missouri, U.S.	
78	Win	62–8–8	Kid Farmer	KO	1 (10)	Apr 14, 1904	Chicago, Illinois, U.S.	
77	Loss	61–8–8	Abe Attell	PTS	6	Mar 28, 1904	American A.C., Chicago, Illinois, U.S.	
76	Win	61–7–8	Barney Abel	KO	3 (10)	Mar 25, 1904	Battery D Armory, Chicago, Illinois, U.S.	
75	Draw	60–7–8	Benny Yanger	PTS	6	Mar 14, 1904	American A.C., Chicago, Illinois, U.S.	
74	Loss	60–7–7	Louie Long	TKO	4 (20)	Feb 12, 1904	Margaret Theatre, Anaconda, Montana, U.S.	
73	Draw	60–6–7	Charles Neary	PTS	6	Jan 22, 1904	Milwaukee Boxing Club, Milwaukee, Wisconsin, U.S.	
72	Draw	60–6–6	Charles Neary	PTS	6	Jan 8, 1904	Panorama Building, Milwaukee, Wisconsin, U.S.	
71	Loss	60–6–5	Jack Cordell	PTS	15	Nov 17, 1903	Reliance A.C., Oakland, California, U.S.	
70	Win	60–5–5	Eddie Santry	KO	13 (20)	Oct 29, 1903	Margaret Theatre, Anaconda, Montana, U.S.	
69	Draw	59–5–5	Louie Long	PTS	20	Oct 15, 1903	Vancouver, British Columbia, Canada	
68	Win	59–5–4	Jack Downey	KO	1 (10)	Jul 2, 1903	Salt Lake City, Utah, U.S.	
67	Win	58–5–4	Kid Broad	KO	4 (10)	Jun 13, 1903	Broadway Theater, Butte, Montana, U.S.	
66	Win	57–5–4	Jack Richards	KO	4 (10)	May 16, 1903	Butte, Montana, U.S.	
65	Win	56–5–4	Cyclone Jackson	KO	2 (10)	May 13, 1903	Butte, Montana, U.S.	
64	Win	55–5–4	Kid Fredericks	KO	3 (20)	May 8, 1903	Broadway Theater, Butte, Montana, U.S.	
63	Win	54–5–4	Jack Richards	KO	4 (20)	Apr 16, 1903	Butte, Montana, U.S.	
62	Win	53–5–4	Cyclone Johnson	KO	1 (?)	Apr 14, 1903	Basin, Montana, U.S.	
61	Win	52–5–4	Jack Clifford	KO	9 (10)	Mar 16, 1903	Broadway Theater, Butte, Montana, U.S.	
60	Win	51–5–4	Tommy Jacobs	KO	3 (20)	Feb 23, 1903	Salt Lake City, Utah, U.S.	
59	Win	50–5–4	Jack Madden	TKO	14 (15)	Feb 19, 1903	Great Falls, Montana, U.S.	
58	Win	49–5–4	Wisconsin Kid	KO	2 (10)	Feb 16, 1903	Tivoli Theater, Lewistown, Montana, U.S.	
57	Win	48–5–4	Jack Kingsley	KO	4 (10)	Feb 13, 1903	Butte, Montana, U.S.	
56	Win	47–5–4	Kid Oglesby	RTD	10 (20)	Feb 5, 1903	Grand Theatre, Butte, Montana, U.S.	
55	Win	46–5–4	George Baker	PTS	20	Dec 17, 1902	Fresno, California, U.S.	
54	Win	45–5–4	Caesar Attell	KO	2 (?)	Nov 21, 1902	Point Richmond, California, U.S.	
53	Win	44–5–4	Tommy Herman	KO	12 (12)	Nov 15, 1902	Richmond, California, U.S.	
52	Win	43–5–4	Caesar Attell	KO	3 (10)	Nov 2, 1902	Oakland, California, U.S.	
51	Loss	42–5–4	Abe Attell	PTS	15	Oct 15, 1902	Exposition Building, Oakland, California, U.S.	
50	Win	42–4–4	Mike Duffy	KO	8 (10)	Oct 3, 1902	Oakland, California, U.S.	
49	Win	41–4–4	Young Dempsey	KO	5 (10)	Sep 19, 1902	Bakersfield, California, U.S.	
48	Win	40–4–4	Jack Lowery	KO	7 (10)	Aug 7, 1902	Bakersfield, California, U.S.	
47	Win	39–4–4	Kid Johnson	KO	4 (10)	May 10, 1902	Bakersfield, California, U.S.	
46	Draw	38–4–4	Tim Hegarty	PTS	20	Mar 18, 1902	Scribner Opera House, Bakersfield, California, U.S.	
45	Win	38–4–3	Kid Chambers	KO	3 (10)	Mar 3, 1902	Fresno, California, U.S.	
44	Win	37–4–3	Billy Wilson	KO	5 (10)	Feb 10, 1902	Madera, California, U.S.	
43	Loss	36–4–3	Tim Hegarty	PTS	20	Jan 27, 1902	Scribner Opera House, Bakersfield, California, U.S.	
42	Win	36–3–3	George Baker	PTS	10	Dec 17, 1901	Fresno, California, U.S.	
41	Win	35–3–3	Tommy Mowatt	KO	3 (10)	Sep 25, 1901	Avon Theater, Madera, California, U.S.	
40	Draw	34–3–3	Tim Hegarty	PTS	20	Sep 5, 1901	Bakersfield, California, U.S.	
39	Loss	34–3–2	Billy DeCoursey	PTS	20	Sep 3, 1901	Hazard's Pavilion, Los Angeles, California, U.S.	
38	Loss	34–2–2	Tim Hegarty	PTS	20	Jul 15, 1901	Bakersfield, California, U.S.	
37	Loss	34–1–2	Terry McGovern	KO	5 (20)	May 29, 1901	Mechanic's Pavilion, San Francisco, California, U.S.	For world featherweight title
36	Win	34–0–2	Toby Irwin	KO	8 (20)	Apr 19, 1901	Scribner Opera House, Bakersfield, California, U.S.	
35	Win	33–0–2	Tommy Cox	KO	8 (10)	Dec 8, 1900	Bakersfield, California, U.S.	
34	Draw	32–0–2	Bob Thompson	PTS	10	Dec 3, 1900	Bakersfield, California, U.S.	
33	Win	32–0–1	Harry Jones	KO	3 (10)	Nov 21, 1900	Bakersfield, California, U.S.	
32	Win	31–0–1	Harry Jones	KO	10 (?)	Sep 22, 1900	San Francisco, California, U.S.	
31	Win	30–0–1	Gypsy Kid	KO	7 (10)	Aug 20, 1900	Bakersfield, California, U.S.	
30	Win	29–0–1	Australian Jim Ryan	KO	3 (10)	Jun 12, 1900	Bakersfield, California, U.S.	
29	Win	28–0–1	Crocky Boyle	KO	10 (10)	Mar 14, 1900	Woodward's Pavilion, San Francisco, California, U.S.	
28	Win	27–0–1	Watermelon Kid	KO	2 (10)	Feb 26, 1900	Bakersfield, California, U.S.	
27	Draw	26–0–1	Tom Sullivan	PTS	6	Feb 11, 1900	Bakersfield, California, U.S.	
26	Win	26–0	Joe Spider Welsh	KO	7 (?)	Feb 2, 1900	Los Angeles, California, U.S.	
25	Win	25–0	Charley Tod	KO	7 (10)	Jan 15, 1900	Bakersfield, California, U.S.	
24	Win	24–0	Kid Chambers	KO	3 (10)	Dec 27, 1899	Randsburg, California, U.S.	
23	Win	23–0	Elmer Reader	KO	3 (10)	Nov 3, 1899	Randsburg, California, U.S.	
22	Win	22–0	Pat Daly	KO	14 (15)	Oct 12, 1899	Bakersfield, California, U.S.	
21	Win	21–0	Kid Remphery	KO	4 (10)	Sep 12, 1899	Bakersfield, California, U.S.	
20	Win	20–0	Billy DeCoursey	TKO	15 (20)	Aug 21, 1899	Southern California A.C., Los Angeles, California, U.S.	
19	Win	19–0	Pat Daly	KO	7 (10)	Aug 10, 1899	Bakersfield, California, U.S.	
18	Win	18–0	Jim Barry	KO	6 (?)	Jun 12, 1899	California, U.S.	
17	Win	17–0	Biddy Bishop	KO	3 (20)	May 29, 1899	Scribner Opera House, Bakersfield, California, U.S.	
16	Win	16–0	Mike Thornton	KO	6 (10)	Feb 22, 1899	Los Angeles, California, U.S.	
15	Win	15–0	Joe Spider Welsh	KO	9 (10)	Jan 17, 1899	Los Angeles, California, U.S.	
14	Win	14–0	Jack Huston	KO	7 (10)	Nov 25, 1898	Old Athletic Hall, Bakersfield, California, U.S.	
13	Win	13–0	Jack Norman	KO	6 (6)	Aug 12, 1898	Bakersfield, California, U.S.	
12	Win	12–0	Dave Hatch	KO	7 (?)	Aug 7, 1898	California, U.S.	
11	Win	11–0	Jack McCormick	KO	4 (6)	Jun 7, 1898	Bakersfield, California, U.S.	
10	Win	10–0	Gypsy Kid	KO	3 (?)	Jan 14, 1898	California, U.S.	
9	Win	9–0	Wilson	KO	3 (?)	Nov 25, 1897	Randsburg, California, U.S.	
8	Win	8–0	Fresno Kid	KO	1 (?)	Nov 2, 1897	California, U.S.	
7	Win	7–0	Charlie Fook	KO	15 (?)	Aug 23, 1897	California, U.S.	
6	Win	6–0	Pat Daly	KO	3 (?)	Jun 19, 1897	California, U.S.	
5	Win	5–0	Mike Thornton	NWS	6	Oct 30, 1896	Bakersfield A.C., Bakersfield, California, U.S.	
4	Win	4–0	Joe Welch	RTD	9 (15)	Aug 14, 1896	Bakersfield A.C., Bakersfield, California, U.S.	
3	Win	3–0	Joe Welch	NWS	4	Jul 24, 1896	Bakersfield A.C., Bakersfield, California, U.S.	
2	Win	2–0	Charles Todd	KO	3 (?)	Oct 14, 1895	Bakersfield A.C., Bakersfield, California, U.S.	
1	Win	1–0	Woo Sing	KO	? (20)	Aug 25, 1893	Bakersfield, California, U.S.	
