= Battling Nelson =

Danish-American boxer (1882–1954)

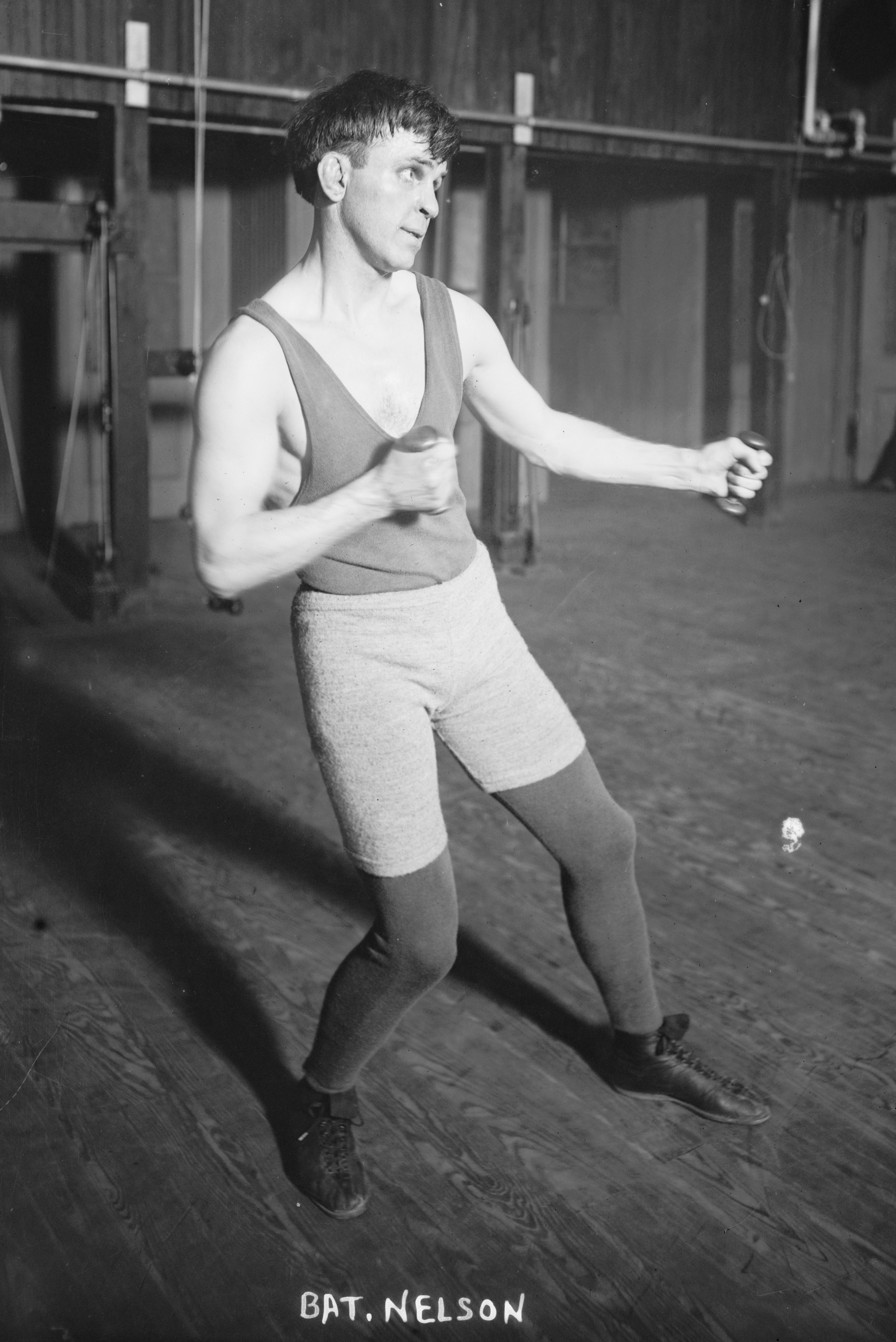
- Nelson c. 1900s

Personal information
- Nickname: The Durable Dane
- Nationality: American
- Born: Oscar Mathæus Nielsen; June 5, 1882 Copenhagen, Denmark
- Died: February 7, 1954 (aged 71) Chicago, Illinois, U.S.
- Weight: Lightweight

Boxing career
- Stance: Orthodox

Boxing record
- Total fights: 134
- Wins: 69
- Win by KO: 40
- Losses: 33
- Draws: 27

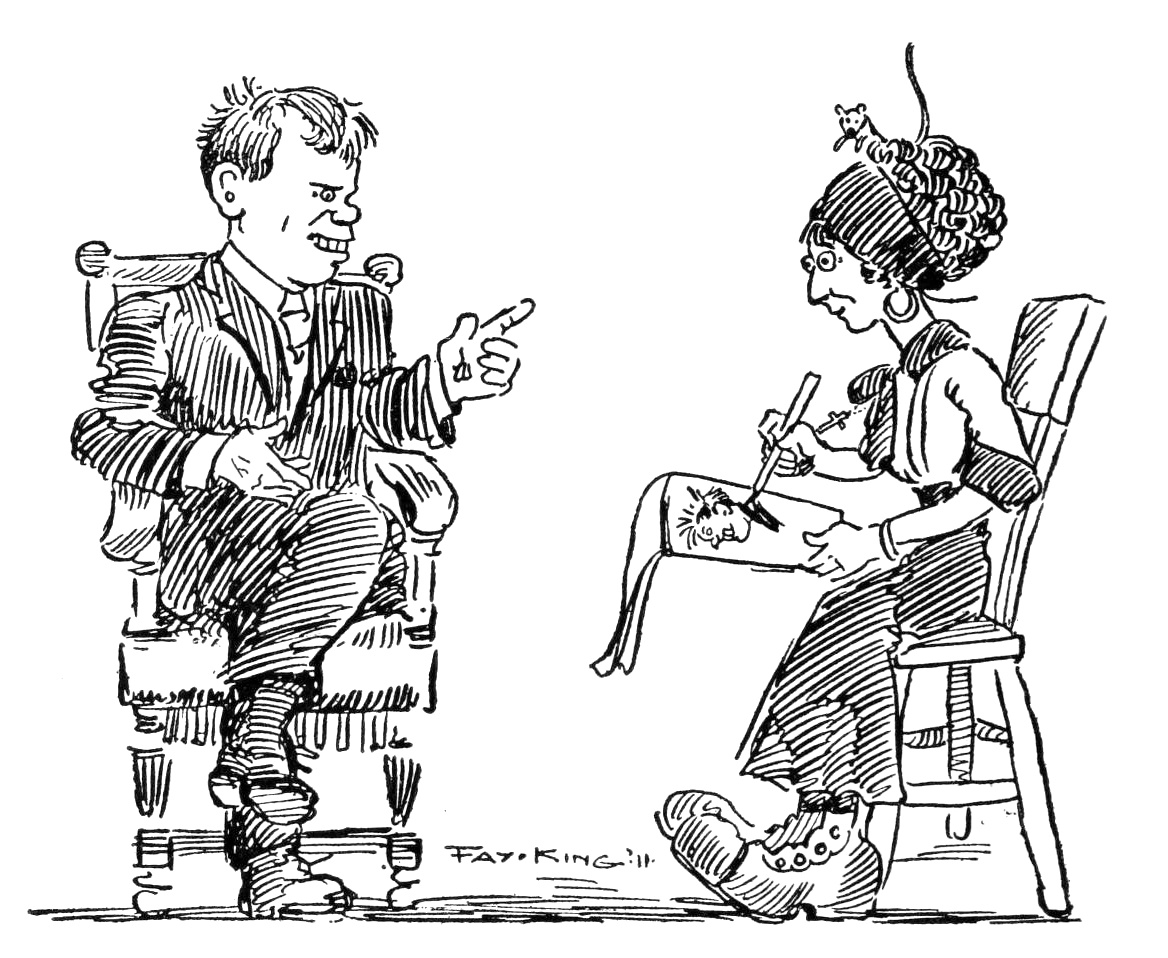
1911 cartoon of Nelson and his future wife Fay King, drawn by herself for his guide The wonders of the Yellowstone National Park.

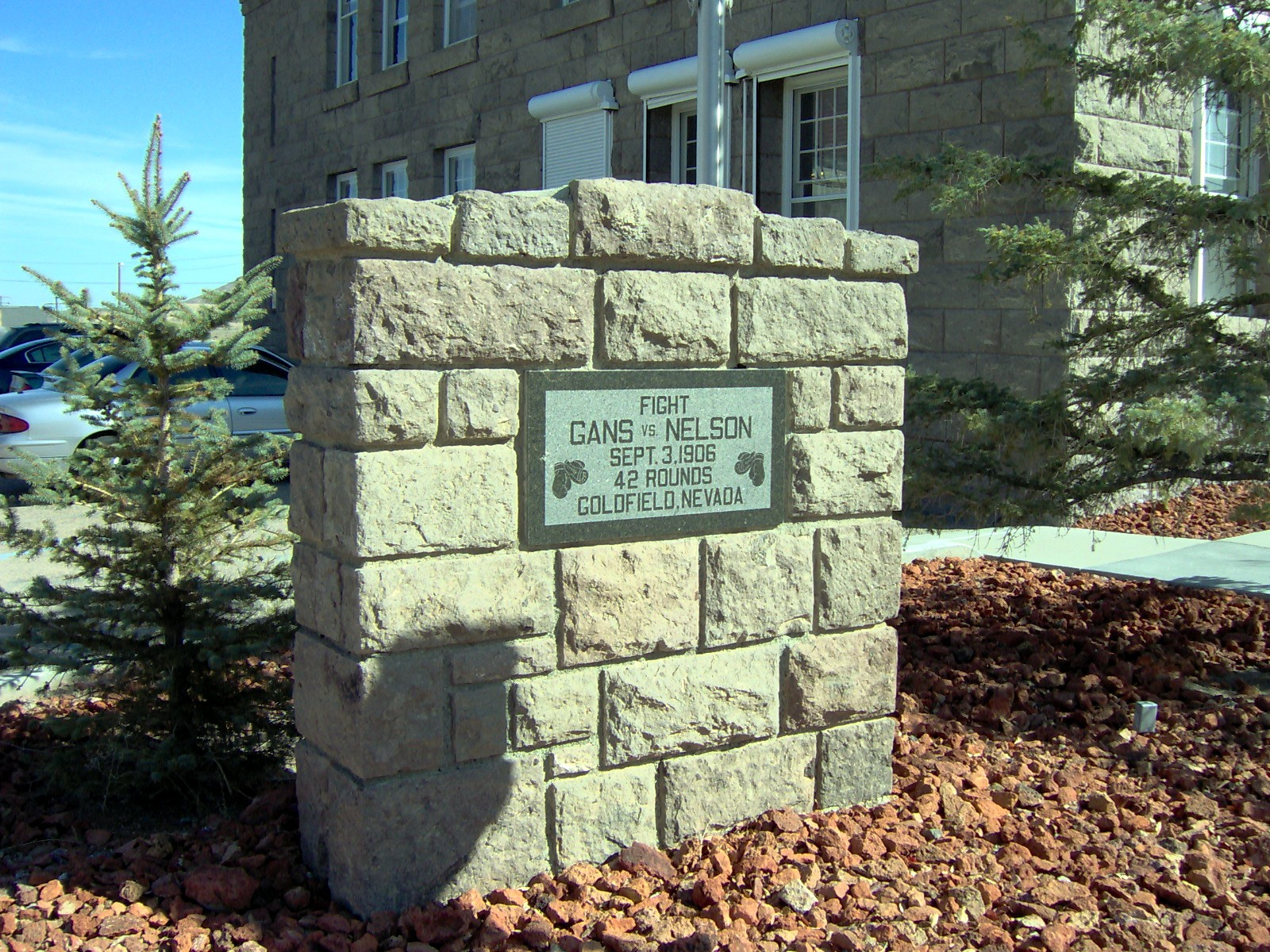
Marker commemorating the 1906 Gans-Nelson fight.

Oscar Matthew "Battling" Nelson (June 5, 1882 – February 7, 1954) was a Danish-American professional boxer who held the World Lightweight championship. He was also nicknamed "the Durable Dane".

== Personal history ==
Nelson was born Oscar Mathæus Nielsen in Copenhagen, Denmark, on June 5, 1882. He emigrated to the United States the following year and was raised in Hegewisch, a neighborhood on the Southeast side of Chicago.

In 1913, he married Fay King, a cartoonist who did his portrait for Nelson's 1911 guide The Wonders of the Yellowstone National Park. In 1916, they had a very public divorce.

Nelson died February 7, 1954, in Chicago, Illinois, from lung cancer. The Veteran Boxing Association paid for part of the cost of his funeral; his ex-wife paid the remainder, in addition to purchasing "beautiful arrangements" for the ceremony.

== Boxing career ==
Nelson began boxing professionally at age fourteen, in 1896. He fought for the vacant lightweight title against Jimmy Britt on December 20, 1904, but lost a twenty-round decision. He lost to Abe Attell in 1905, but his win over Jack O'Neill secured him another shot at the world championship. On September 9, 1905, Nelson finally beat Britt in a knockout in the 18th round of a 45-round bout.

He defeated Terry McGovern in a no-decision Newspaper decision, but then faced a greater challenge when he faced off against the reigning world lightweight champion Joe Gans on September 3, 1906, in Goldfield, Nevada. Gans dropped Nelson repeatedly during the bout, but could not knock him out. Finally, in the forty-second round, Nelson hit Gans below the belt causing him to lose the fight by disqualification.

In 1907 and 1908, Nelson split a pair of bouts with Britt and fought Attell to a draw. He then challenged Gans again for the world lightweight title on July 4, 1908. This time he knocked Gans out in the seventeenth round. Two months later, Nelson knocked out Gans in the twenty-first round.

In 1909, Nelson fought Ad Wolgast in a fight held over the lightweight limit. Wolgast beat him, and Nelson gave Wolgast a chance at his title on February 22, 1910. Eventually unable to see due to the accumulation of punches, Nelson lost the title when the referee stopped the fight in either the fortieth or the forty-second round.

Nelson continued to fight, and in 1917, he challenged Freddie Welsh for the lightweight title. He lost a twelve-round decision and retired from fighting in 1920.

He was elected to the International Boxing Hall of Fame in 1992.

In 2016, award-winning biographer Mark Allen Baker published the first comprehensive biography of Nelson with McFarland, a leading independent publisher of academic and nonfiction books.

== Motion pictures of Nelson's fights ==
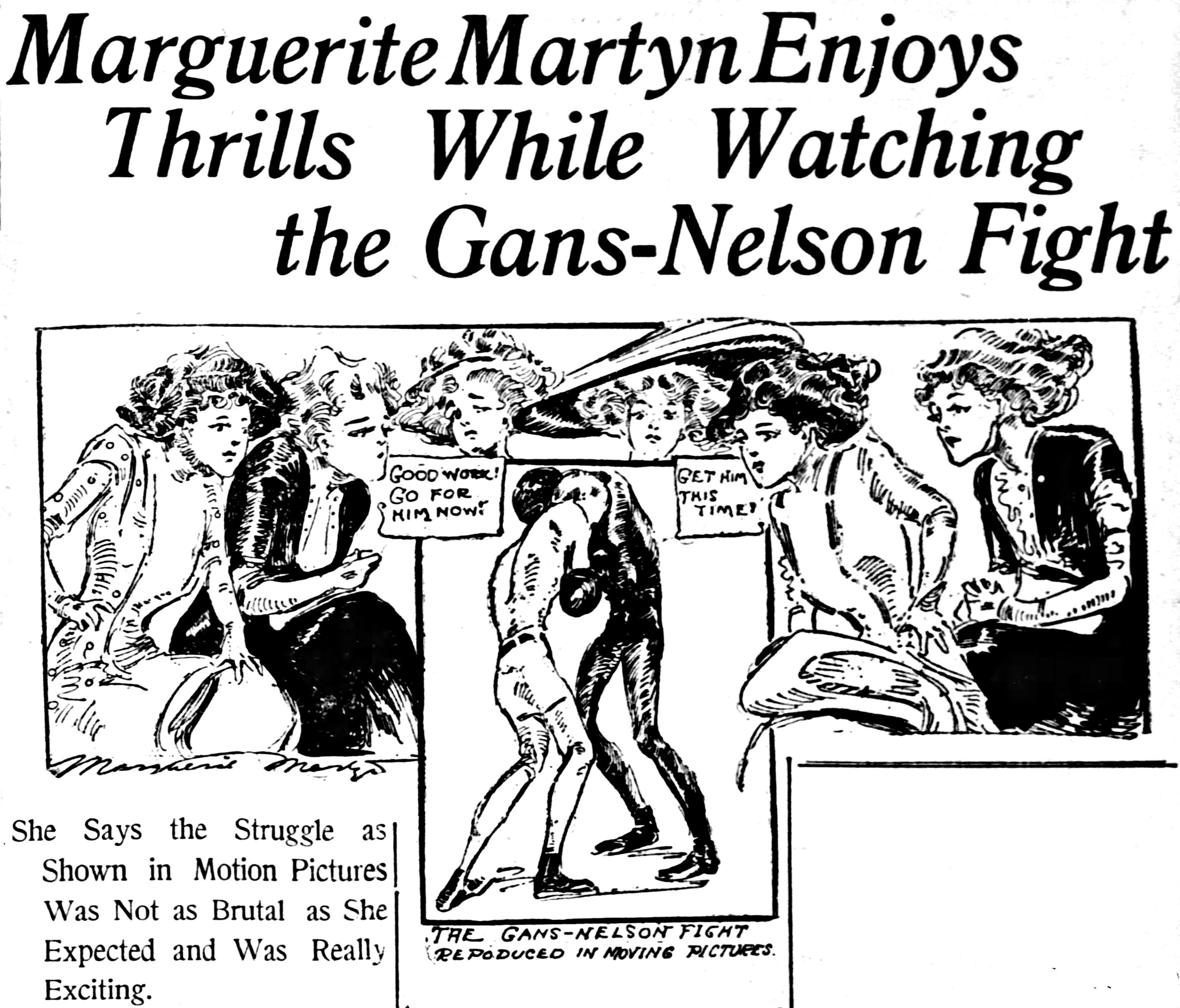
A motion picture of the second Gans-Nelson fight in Colma, California, was shown in theaters across the country. Above, reporter-artist Marguerite Martyn sketched her impression of women watching the fight in St. Louis, Missouri, in October 1908.

The second Gans-Nelson battle in Colma was the subject of a four-reel motion picture that played in major cities around the country.

== Professional boxing record ==
All information in this section is derived from BoxRec, unless otherwise stated.

=== Official record ===
134 fights	59 wins	20 losses
By knockout	40	3
By decision	19	16
By disqualification	0	1
Draws	22	
No contests	5	
Newspaper decisions/draws	28	

All newspaper decisions are officially regarded as “no decision” bouts and are not counted in the win/loss/draw column.

No.	Result	Record	Opponent	Type	Round	Date	Location	Note
134	Loss	59–20–22 (33)	Freddie Welsh	NWS	12	Apr 17, 1917	Coliseum, Saint Louis, Missouri, U.S.	World lightweight title at stake; (via KO only)
133	Win	59–20–22 (32)	Pierce Matthews	TKO	8 (12)	Mar 17, 1917	Saint Louis, Missouri, U.S.	
132	Loss	58–20–22 (32)	Jimmy Reagan	PTS	10	Nov 5, 1915	20th Century A.C., Kansas City, Missouri, U.S.	
131	Loss	58–19–22 (31)	Bobby Waugh	PTS	20	Sep 6, 1915	Plaza de Toros, Ciudad Juarez, Chihuahua, Mexico	
130	Win	58–18–22 (31)	Dale Gardner	KO	2 (?)	Apr 24, 1915	Havana, Cuba	
129	Win	57–18–22 (31)	Jimmy Fryer	PTS	25	Mar 24, 1915	Havana, Cuba	
128	Win	56–18–22 (31)	Stewart Donnelly	KO	3 (?)	Mar 18, 1915	Havana, Cuba	
127	Win	55–18–22 (31)	Cliff Ford	PTS	6	Aug 19, 1913	Soo Opera House, Sault Sainte Marie, Michigan, U.S.	
126	Loss	54–18–22 (31)	Ad Wolgast	NWS	10	Oct 13, 1913	Southside A.A., Milwaukee, Wisconsin, U.S.	
125	Loss	54–18–22 (30)	Pat Bradley	NWS	6 (10)	May 3, 1913	National A.C., Philadelphia, Pennsylvania, U.S.	
124	Loss	54–18–22 (29)	Gilbert Gallant	PTS	12	Apr 29, 1913	Arena (Armory A.A.), Boston, Massachusetts, U.S.	
123	Draw	54–17–22 (29)	Bay Wood	PTS	12	Apr 19, 1913	Elm Rink, New Bedford, Massachusetts, U.S.	
122	Win	54–17–21 (29)	Mike Malone	NWS	10	Mar 27, 1913	Pueblo, Colorado, U.S.	
121	Loss	54–17–21 (28)	Frank Ray Whitney	NWS	10	Mar 5, 1913	Armory Auditorium, Atlanta, Georgia, U.S.	No decision rendered by prior agreement Whitney won Newspaper Decision
120	Draw	54–17–21 (27)	Bay Wood	PTS	12	Feb 22, 1913	Bristol Arena, New Bedford, Massachusetts, U.S.	
119	Win	54–17–20 (27)	Joe Burke	NWS	10	Feb 17, 1913	Orpheum Theatre, Easton, Pennsylvania, U.S.	
118	Win	54–17–20 (26)	Harry Dillon	TKO	10 (10)	Feb 11, 1913	Tamaqua, Pennsylvania, U.S.	
117	Win	53–17–20 (26)	Jack Sorenson	NWS	10	Feb 5, 1913	Lakeside Auditorium, Racine, Wisconsin, U.S.	
116	Loss	53–17–20 (25)	Frankie Russell	PTS	10	Jan 3, 1913	Greenwall Theater, New Orleans, Louisiana, U.S.	Nelson claimed he fought under the belief that without a knockout the bout would be declared a draw or no decision
115	Loss	53–16–20 (25)	Yankee Schwartz	NWS	8	Dec 31, 1912	Columbus, Ohio, U.S.	
114	Draw	53–16–20 (24)	Jim Bonner	PTS	10	Dec 20, 1912	Walker's Hall, Tamaqua, Pennsylvania, U.S.	
113	Draw	53–16–19 (24)	Teddy Maloney	NWS	6	Dec 13, 1912	Olympia A.C., Philadelphia, Pennsylvania, U.S.	
112	Loss	53–16–19 (23)	Leach Cross	NWS	10	Nov 28, 1912	44th Street A.C., New Amsterdam Opera House, New York City, New York, U.S.	
111	Win	53–16–19 (22)	Art Stewart	NWS	10	Nov 14, 1912	Hammond, Indiana, U.S.	
110	Draw	53–16–19 (21)	Steve Ketchel	PTS	15	Sep 2, 1912	Saint Joseph, Missouri, U.S.	
109	Loss	53–16–18 (21)	Mickey MacIntyre	NWS	12	Jul 12, 1912	Winnipeg, Manitoba, Canada	
108	Win	53–16–18 (20)	Andy Bezenah	NWS	12	Jul 1, 1912	Auditorium Rink, Winnipeg, Manitoba, Canada	
107	Draw	53–16–18 (19)	Sammy Trott	PTS	15	Mar 1, 1912	Dayton, Ohio, U.S.	
106	Draw	53–16–17 (19)	Young Togo	PTS	6	Feb 26, 1912	Athletic Club, Fort Smith, Arkansas, U.S.	
105	Loss	53–16–16 (19)	Tommy O'Rourke	NWS	10	Jan 9, 1912	Springfield, Missouri, U.S.	
104	Win	53–16–16 (18)	Jack Redmond	PTS	20	Dec 31, 1911	West Side A.C., Gretna, Louisiana, U.S.	
103	Loss	52–16–16 (18)	One Round Hogan	NWS	10	Dec 22, 1911	Madison A.C., New York City, New York, U.S.	
102	Win	52–16–16 (17)	Willie Howard	NWS	10	Dec 18, 1911	Irving A.C., Brooklyn, New York City, New York, U.S.	
101	Win	52–16–16 (16)	Bobby Wilson	NWS	10	Dec 15, 1911	Oneida County A.C., Utica, New York, U.S.	
100	Draw	52–16–16 (15)	Andy Bezenah	NWS	10	Dec 4, 1911	Jeffersonville, Indiana, U.S.	
99	Win	52–16–16 (14)	Joseph Spero	KO	6 (20)	Nov 30, 1911	Agnes Street Theatre, Toronto, Ontario, Canada	
98	Draw	51–16–16 (14)	Louis De Ponthieu	NWS	10	Nov 25, 1911	Convention Hall, Buffalo, New York, U.S.	
97	Win	51–16–16 (13)	Tommy Moore	TKO	9 (10)	Nov 10, 1911	Convention Hall, Buffalo, New York, U.S.	
96	Draw	50–16–16 (13)	Frank Loughrey	NWS	10	Nov 6, 1911	Grogan A.C., Watervliet, New York, U.S.	
95	Win	50–16–16 (12)	Monte Dale	PTS	15	Oct 25, 1911	Mechanics Hall, Manchester, New Hampshire, U.S.	
94	Loss	49–16–16 (12)	George Alger	NWS	6	Oct 19, 1911	Augusta, Maine, U.S.	
93	Loss	49–16–16 (12)	Philadelphia Pal Moore	PTS	12	Oct 17, 1911	Armory A.A., Boston, Massachusetts, U.S.	
92	Win	49–15–16 (12)	Willie Beecher	NWS	10	Oct 11, 1911	Madison Square Garden, New York City, New York, U.S.	
91	Loss	49–15–16 (11)	Milburn Saylor	PTS	12	Oct 3, 1911	Armory A.A., Boston, Massachusetts, U.S.	
90	Win	49–14–16 (11)	Billy Nixon	TKO	10 (12)	Sep 19, 1911	Armory A.A., Boston, Massachusetts, U.S.	
89	Win	48–14–16 (11)	Tommy Gaffney	TKO	5 (10)	Aug 4, 1911	Opera House, Medford, Oregon, U.S.	
88	Draw	47–14–16 (11)	Percy Cove	PTS	6	Jul 4, 1911	Fairgrounds, Bellingham, Washington, U.S.	
87	Loss	47–14–15 (11)	Owen Moran	KO	11 (20)	Nov 26, 1910	Blot's Arena, San Francisco, California, U.S.	
86	Draw	47–13–15 (11)	Anton LaGrave	PTS	15	Oct 31, 1910	Dreamland Pavilion, San Francisco, California, U.S.	
85	Win	47–13–14 (11)	Monte Dale	TKO	3 (10)	Oct 10, 1910	Hippodrome, Kansas City, Missouri, U.S.	
84	Loss	46–13–14 (11)	Ad Wolgast	TKO	40 (45)	Feb 22, 1910	Arena, Point Richmond, California, U.S.	Lost world lightweight title
83	Win	46–12–14 (11)	Eddie Lang	TKO	8 (8)	Jan 21, 1910	Memphis A.C., Memphis, Tennessee, U.S.	Retained world lightweight title
82	Loss	45–12–14 (11)	Ad Wolgast	NWS	10	Jul 13, 1909	Naud Junction Pavilion, Los Angeles, California, U.S.	
81	Win	45–12–14 (10)	Jack Clifford	TKO	5 (15)	Jun 22, 1909	Auditorium, Oklahoma City, Oklahoma, U.S.	
80	Win	44–12–14 (10)	Dick Hyland	KO	23 (45)	May 29, 1909	Mission Street Arena, Colma, California, U.S.	Retained world lightweight title
79	Win	43–12–14 (10)	Joe Gans	KO	21 (45)	Sep 9, 1908	Mission Street Arena, Colma, California, U.S.	Retained world lightweight title
78	Win	42–12–14 (10)	Joe Gans	KO	17 (45)	Jul 4, 1908	Mission Street Arena, Colma, California, U.S.	Won world lightweight title
77	Draw	41–12–14 (10)	Abe Attell	PTS	15	Mar 31, 1908	Coliseum, San Francisco, California, U.S.	
76	Draw	41–12–13 (10)	Jimmy Britt	NWS	10	Mar 3, 1908	Naud Junction Pavilion, Los Angeles, California, U.S.	
75	Loss	41–12–13 (9)	Rudy Unholz	NWS	10	Feb 4, 1908	Naud Junction Pavilion, Los Angeles, California, U.S.	
74	Win	41–12–13 (8)	Jack Clifford	KO	5 (20)	Jan 13, 1908	Opera House, Ogden, Utah, U.S.	
73	Loss	40–12–13 (8)	Jimmy Britt	PTS	20	Jul 31, 1907	Auditorium Rink, San Francisco, California, U.S.	Lost world 'white' lightweight title
72	Loss	40–11–13 (8)	Joe Gans	DQ	42 (?)	Sep 3, 1906	Casino Amphitheatre, Goldfield, Nevada, U.S.	For world lightweight title
71	Win	40–10–13 (8)	Terry McGovern	NWS	6	Mar 14, 1906	National A.C., Philadelphia, Pennsylvania, U.S.	
70	Win	40–10–13 (7)	Jimmy Britt	KO	18 (20)	Sep 9, 1905	Mission Street Arena, Colma, California, U.S.	Won world 'white' lightweight title
69	Win	39–10–13 (7)	Jack O'Neil	NWS	6	Jun 6, 1905	National A.C., Philadelphia, Pennsylvania, U.S.	
68	Draw	39–10–13 (6)	Kid Sullivan	PTS	6	Jun 2, 1905	Eureka A.C., Baltimore, Maryland, U.S.	
67	Loss	39–10–12 (6)	Abe Attell	NWS	6	May 22, 1905	National A.C., Philadelphia, Pennsylvania, U.S.	
66	Win	39–10–12 (5)	Young Corbett II	TKO	9 (20)	Feb 28, 1905	Woodward's Pavilion, San Francisco, California, U.S.	
65	Loss	38–10–12 (5)	Jimmy Britt	PTS	20	Dec 20, 1904	Mechanic's Pavilion, San Francisco, California, U.S.	For vacant world 'white' lightweight title
64	Win	38–9–12 (5)	Young Corbett II	TKO	10 (20)	Nov 29, 1904	Woodward's Pavilion, San Francisco, California, U.S.	
63	Win	37–9–12 (5)	Aurelio Herrera	PTS	20	Sep 5, 1904	Montana A.C., Butte, Montana, U.S.	
62	Win	36–9–12 (5)	Eddie Hanlon	TKO	19 (20)	Jul 29, 1904	Woodward's Pavilion, San Francisco, California, U.S.	
61	Win	35–9–12 (5)	Martin Canole	KO	18 (20)	May 20, 1904	Woodward's Pavilion, San Francisco, California, U.S.	
60	Win	34–9–12 (5)	Joe Spider Welsh	TKO	16 (20)	Apr 5, 1904	Salt Palace, Salt Lake City, Utah, U.S.	
59	Win	33–9–12 (5)	Jack O'Neil	PTS	6	Feb 5, 1904	Badger A.C., Milwaukee, Wisconsin, U.S.	
58	Win	32–9–12 (5)	Art Simms	KO	3 (6)	Jan 16, 1904	Milwaukee A.C., Milwaukee, Wisconsin, U.S.	
57	Win	31–9–12 (5)	Clarence English	PTS	15	Dec 28, 1903	Saint Joseph, Missouri, U.S.	
56	Win	30–9–12 (5)	George Memsic	PTS	6	Nov 10, 1903	Badger A.C., Milwaukee, U.S.	
55	Loss	29–9–12 (5)	Charles Neary	PTS	6	Oct 16, 1903	Badger A.C., Milwaukee, U.S.	
54	NC	29–8–12 (5)	Daredevil Tildon	NC	2 (?)	Sep 3, 1903	Chicago, Illinois, U.S.	Police stopped the fight
53	Loss	29–8–12 (4)	Eddie Sterns	KO	9 (?)	Aug 26, 1903	Michigan City, Indiana, U.S.	
52	Draw	29–7–12 (4)	Mickey Riley	PTS	15	Jul 24, 1903	Hurley, Wisconsin, U.S.	
51	NC	29–7–11 (4)	Mickey Riley	NC	11 (?)	Jul 15, 1903	Ashland, Wisconsin, U.S.	Police stopped the fight
50	Draw	29–7–11 (3)	Clarence English	PTS	15	Jun 27, 1903	Kansas City, Missouri, U.S.	
49	Win	29–7–10 (3)	Larry McDonald	KO	4 (?)	Jun 20, 1903	Harvey, Illinois, U.S.	
48	Draw	28–7–10 (3)	Mickey Riley	PTS	6	Jun 19, 1903	Panorama Building, Milwaukee, Wisconsin, U.S.	
47	Win	28–7–9 (3)	Young Scotty	PTS	8	Jun 16, 1903	Fond du Lac, Wisconsin, U.S.	
46	Win	27–7–9 (3)	Stockings Kelly	KO	4 (?)	May 22, 1903	Milwaukee, Wisconsin, U.S.	
45	Win	26–7–9 (3)	Cyclone Johnny Thompson	PTS	6	Apr 24, 1903	Milwaukee A.C., Milwaukee, Wisconsin, U.S.	
44	Draw	25–7–9 (3)	Adam Ryan	PTS	15	Mar 4, 1903	Capital Theater, Little Rock, Arkansas, U.S.	
43	Win	25–7–8 (3)	Sammy Maxwell	KO	10 (?)	Jan 6, 1903	Hot Springs, Arkansas, U.S.	
42	Win	24–7–8 (3)	Christy Williams	KO	17 (?)	Dec 26, 1902	Hot Springs, Arkansas, U.S.	
41	Win	23–7–8 (3)	Billy Mayfield	PTS	10	Dec 2, 1902	Hot Springs, Arkansas, U.S.	
40	Draw	22–7–8 (3)	Battling Hurley	PTS	6	Jun 14, 1902	Hammond, Indiana, U.S.	
39	Win	22–7–7 (3)	Pudden Burns	PTS	6	May 17, 1902	Hegewisch, Illinois, U.S.	
38	Draw	21–7–7 (3)	Danny McMahon	PTS	6	Apr 12, 1902	West Pullman, Illinois, U.S.	
37	Win	21–7–6 (3)	William Rossler	KO	1 (?)	Apr 5, 1902	Harvey, Illinois, U.S.	
36	Win	20–7–6 (3)	Cyclone Johnny Thompson	PTS	6	Mar 21, 1902	Wabash A.C., Chicago, Illinois, U.S.	
35	Win	19–7–6 (3)	Kid Ryan	KO	5 (?)	Mar 17, 1902	American A.C., Chicago, Illinois, U.S.	
34	Win	18–7–6 (3)	Joe Percente	PTS	8	Mar 13, 1902	Oshkosh, Wisconsin, U.S.	
33	Loss	17–7–6 (3)	Charles Berry	PTS	8	Jan 21, 1902	Fond du Lac, Wisconsin, U.S.	
32	Win	17–6–6 (3)	Frank Colifer	KO	5 (?)	Jan 13, 1902	West Pullman, Illinois, U.S.	
31	Loss	16–6–6 (3)	Charles Berry	PTS	6	Dec 17, 1901	Badger A.C., Milwaukee, Wisconsin, U.S.	
30	Win	16–5–6 (3)	Mike Walsh	KO	6 (6)	Dec 16, 1901	American A.C., Chicago, Illinois, U.S.	
29	Draw	15–5–6 (3)	Joe Percente	PTS	6	Dec 2, 1901	Milwaukee Boxing Club, Milwaukee, Wisconsin, U.S.	
28	Loss	15–5–5 (3)	Eddie Santry	PTS	6	Nov 29, 1901	Pyramid A.C., Chicago, Illinois, U.S.	
27	Loss	15–4–5 (3)	Joe Percente	PTS	6	Nov 15, 1901	Milwaukee, Wisconsin, U.S.	
26	NC	15–3–5 (3)	Billy Heck	ND	4	Nov 10, 1901	West Pullman, Wisconsin, U.S.	
25	Draw	15–3–5 (2)	Harry Fails	PTS	10	May 24, 1901	Rhinelander, Wisconsin, U.S.	
24	NC	15–3–4 (2)	Harry Fails	ND	6	May 18, 1901	Omro, Wisconsin, U.S.	
23	Draw	15–3–4 (1)	Charles Berry	PTS	6	May 3, 1901	Milwaukee Boxing Club, Milwaukee, Wisconsin, U.S.	
22	Loss	15–3–3 (1)	Mickey Riley	PTS	6	Apr 19, 1901	Milwaukee, Wisconsin, U.S.	
21	Win	15–2–3 (1)	Black Griffo	KO	3 (?)	Mar 17, 1901	Chicago, Illinois, U.S.	
20	Win	14–2–3 (1)	Jack Martin	PTS	4	Dec 8, 1900	Chicago, Illinois, U.S.	
19	Win	13–2–3 (1)	Joe Percente	DQ	2 (?)	Dec 7, 1900	Star Theatre, Chicago, Illinois, U.S.	
18	Draw	12–2–3 (1)	Danny McMahon	PTS	4	Dec 1, 1900	Chicago, Illinois, U.S.	
17	Loss	12–2–2 (1)	Pete Boyle	DQ	4 (?)	Dec 1, 1900	Chicago, Illinois, U.S.	
16	Win	12–1–2 (1)	Ed Burley	KO	5 (?)	Nov 22, 1900	Chicago, Illinois, U.S.	
15	Win	11–1–2 (1)	Black Griffo	KO	3 (?)	Nov 15, 1900	Chicago, Illinois, U.S.	
14	Draw	10–1–2 (1)	Clarence Class	PTS	6	Nov 2, 1900	Chicago, Illinois, U.S.	
13	Win	10–1–1 (1)	Young Bay	PTS	6	Oct 8, 1900	Chicago, Illinois, U.S.	
12	Win	9–1–1 (1)	Young Griffin	PTS	6	Sep 21, 1900	Orpheus A.C., Chicago, Illinois, U.S.	
11	Loss	8–1–1 (1)	Joe Hedmark	PTS	6	Sep 14, 1900	Star Theatre, Chicago, Illinois, U.S.	
10	Win	8–0–1 (1)	Charles Dougherty	KO	1 (?)	Aug 30, 1900	Star Theatre, Chicago, Illinois, U.S.	
9	NC	7–0–1 (1)	Feathers Vernon	ND	6	Jul 4, 1900	West Pullman, Illinois, U.S.	
8	Win	7–0–1	John Smith	KO	2 (?)	Jun 1, 1899	Chicago, Illinois, U.S.	
7	Win	6–0–1	Bull Winters	KO	1 (?)	May 3, 1899	Chicago, Illinois, U.S.	
6	Win	5–0–1	Eddie Penny	KO	1 (?)	Apr 6, 1899	Chicago, Illinois, U.S.	
5	Draw	4–0–1	Eddie Herman	PTS	6	Jan 1, 1899	Hegewisch, Illinois, U.S.	
4	Win	4–0	Soldier Williams	KO	3 (?)	May 11, 1898	Sioux Falls, South Dakota, U.S.	
3	Win	3–0	Freddie Green	KO	7 (?)	May 10, 1898	Sioux Falls, South Dakota, U.S.	
2	Win	2–0	Ole Olsen	PTS	3	Jun 5, 1897	Hegewisch, Illinois, U.S.	
1	Win	1–0	Wallace Kid	KO	1 (?)	Sep 3, 1896	Hammond, Indiana, U.S.	

=== Unofficial record ===
172 fights	97 wins	46 losses
By knockout	40	3
By decision	56	39
By disqualification	1	4
Draws	28	
No contests	1	

Record with the inclusion of newspaper decisions in the win/loss/draw column.

No.	Result	Record	Opponent	Type	Round	Date	Location	Notes
134	Loss	69–33–27 (5)	Freddie Welsh	NWS	12	Apr 17, 1917	Coliseum, Saint Louis, Missouri, U.S.	World lightweight title at stake; (via KO only)
133	Win	69–32–27 (5)	Pierce Matthews	TKO	8 (12)	Mar 17, 1917	Saint Louis, Missouri, U.S.	
132	Loss	68–32–27 (5)	Jimmy Reagan	PTS	10	Nov 5, 1915	20th Century A.C., Kansas City, Missouri, U.S.	
131	Loss	68–31–27 (5)	Bobby Waugh	PTS	20	Sep 6, 1915	Plaza de Toros, Ciudad Juarez, Chihuahua, Mexico	
130	Win	68–30–27 (5)	Dale Gardner	KO	2 (?)	Apr 24, 1915	Havana, Cuba	
129	Win	67–30–27 (5)	Jimmy Fryer	PTS	25	Mar 24, 1915	Havana, Cuba	
128	Win	66–30–27 (5)	Stewart Donnelly	KO	3 (?)	Mar 18, 1915	Havana, Cuba	
127	Win	65–30–27 (5)	Cliff Ford	PTS	6	Aug 19, 1913	Soo Opera House, Sault Sainte Marie, Michigan, U.S.	
126	Loss	64–30–27 (5)	Ad Wolgast	NWS	10	Oct 13, 1913	Southside A.A., Milwaukee, Wisconsin, U.S.	
125	Loss	64–29–27 (5)	Pat Bradley	NWS	6 (10)	May 3, 1913	National A.C., Philadelphia, Pennsylvania, U.S.	
124	Loss	64–28–27 (5)	Gilbert Gallant	PTS	12	Apr 29, 1913	Arena (Armory A.A.), Boston, Massachusetts, U.S.	
123	Draw	64–27–27 (5)	Bay Wood	PTS	12	Apr 19, 1913	Elm Rink, New Bedford, Massachusetts, U.S.	
122	Win	64–27–26 (5)	Mike Malone	NWS	10	Mar 27, 1913	Pueblo, Colorado, U.S.	
121	Loss	63–27–26 (5)	Frank Ray Whitney	NWS	10	Mar 5, 1913	Armory Auditorium, Atlanta, Georgia, U.S.	No decision rendered by prior agreement Whitney won Newspaper Decision
120	Draw	63–26–26 (5)	Bay Wood	PTS	12	Feb 22, 1913	Bristol Arena, New Bedford, Massachusetts, U.S.	
119	Win	63–26–25 (5)	Joe Burke	NWS	10	Feb 17, 1913	Orpheum Theatre, Easton, Pennsylvania, U.S.	
118	Win	62–26–25 (5)	Harry Dillon	TKO	10 (10)	Feb 11, 1913	Tamaqua, Pennsylvania, U.S.	
117	Win	61–26–25 (5)	Jack Sorenson	NWS	10	Feb 5, 1913	Lakeside Auditorium, Racine, Wisconsin, U.S.	
116	Loss	60–26–25 (5)	Frankie Russell	PTS	10	Jan 3, 1913	Greenwall Theater, New Orleans, Louisiana, U.S.	Nelson claimed he fought under the belief that without a knockout the bout would be declared a draw or no decision
115	Loss	60–25–25 (5)	Yankee Schwartz	NWS	8	Dec 31, 1912	Columbus, Ohio, U.S.	
114	Draw	60–24–25 (5)	Jim Bonner	PTS	10	Dec 20, 1912	Walker's Hall, Tamaqua, Pennsylvania, U.S.	
113	Draw	60–24–24 (5)	Teddy Maloney	NWS	6	Dec 13, 1912	Olympia A.C., Philadelphia, Pennsylvania, U.S.	
112	Loss	60–24–23 (5)	Leach Cross	NWS	10	Nov 28, 1912	44th Street A.C., New Amsterdam Opera House, New York City, New York, U.S.	
111	Win	60–23–23 (5)	Art Stewart	NWS	10	Nov 14, 1912	Hammond, Indiana, U.S.	
110	Draw	59–23–23 (5)	Steve Ketchel	PTS	15	Sep 2, 1912	Saint Joseph, Missouri, U.S.	
109	Loss	59–23–22 (5)	Mickey MacIntyre	NWS	12	Jul 12, 1912	Winnipeg, Manitoba, Canada	
108	Win	59–22–22 (5)	Andy Bezenah	NWS	12	Jul 1, 1912	Auditorium Rink, Winnipeg, Manitoba, Canada	
107	Draw	58–22–22 (5)	Sammy Trott	PTS	15	Mar 1, 1912	Dayton, Ohio, U.S.	
106	Draw	58–22–21 (5)	Young Togo	PTS	6	Feb 26, 1912	Athletic Club, Fort Smith, Arkansas, U.S.	
105	Loss	58–22–20 (5)	Tommy O'Rourke	NWS	10	Jan 9, 1912	Springfield, Missouri, U.S.	
104	Win	58–21–20 (5)	Jack Redmond	PTS	20	Dec 31, 1911	West Side A.C., Gretna, Louisiana, U.S.	
103	Loss	57–21–20 (5)	One Round Hogan	NWS	10	Dec 22, 1911	Madison A.C., New York City, New York, U.S.	
102	Win	57–20–20 (5)	Willie Howard	NWS	10	Dec 18, 1911	Irving A.C., Brooklyn, New York City, New York, U.S.	
101	Win	56–20–20 (5)	Bobby Wilson	NWS	10	Dec 15, 1911	Oneida County A.C., Utica, New York, U.S.	
100	Draw	55–20–20 (5)	Andy Bezenah	NWS	10	Dec 4, 1911	Jeffersonville, Indiana, U.S.	
99	Win	55–20–19 (5)	Joseph Spero	KO	6 (20)	Nov 30, 1911	Agnes Street Theatre, Toronto, Ontario, Canada	
98	Draw	54–20–19 (5)	Louis De Ponthieu	NWS	10	Nov 25, 1911	Convention Hall, Buffalo, New York, U.S.	
97	Win	54–20–18 (5)	Tommy Moore	TKO	9 (10)	Nov 10, 1911	Convention Hall, Buffalo, New York, U.S.	
96	Draw	53–20–18 (5)	Frank Loughrey	NWS	10	Nov 6, 1911	Grogan A.C., Watervliet, New York, U.S.	
95	Win	53–20–17 (5)	Monte Dale	PTS	15	Oct 25, 1911	Mechanics Hall, Manchester, New Hampshire, U.S.	
94	Loss	52–20–17 (5)	George Alger	NWS	6	Oct 19, 1911	Augusta, Maine, U.S.	
93	Loss	52–19–17 (5)	Philadelphia Pal Moore	PTS	12	Oct 17, 1911	Armory A.A., Boston, Massachusetts, U.S.	
92	Win	52–18–17 (5)	Willie Beecher	NWS	10	Oct 11, 1911	Madison Square Garden, New York City, New York, U.S.	
91	Loss	51–18–17 (5)	Milburn Saylor	PTS	12	Oct 3, 1911	Armory A.A., Boston, Massachusetts, U.S.	
90	Win	51–17–17 (5)	Billy Nixon	TKO	10 (12)	Sep 19, 1911	Armory A.A., Boston, Massachusetts, U.S.	
89	Win	50–17–17 (5)	Tommy Gaffney	TKO	5 (10)	Aug 4, 1911	Opera House, Medford, Oregon, U.S.	
88	Draw	49–17–17 (5)	Percy Cove	PTS	6	Jul 4, 1911	Fairgrounds, Bellingham, Washington, U.S.	
87	Loss	49–17–16 (5)	Owen Moran	KO	11 (20)	Nov 26, 1910	Blot's Arena, San Francisco, California, U.S.	
86	Draw	49–16–16 (5)	Anton LaGrave	PTS	15	Oct 31, 1910	Dreamland Pavilion, San Francisco, California, U.S.	
85	Win	49–16–15 (5)	Monte Dale	TKO	3 (10)	Oct 10, 1910	Hippodrome, Kansas City, Missouri, U.S.	
84	Loss	48–16–15 (5)	Ad Wolgast	TKO	40 (45)	Feb 22, 1910	Arena, Point Richmond, California, U.S.	Lost world lightweight title
83	Win	48–15–15 (5)	Eddie Lang	TKO	8 (8)	Jan 21, 1910	Memphis A.C., Memphis, Tennessee, U.S.	Retained world lightweight title
82	Loss	47–15–15 (5)	Ad Wolgast	NWS	10	Jul 13, 1909	Naud Junction Pavilion, Los Angeles, California, U.S.	
81	Win	47–14–15 (5)	Jack Clifford	TKO	5 (15)	Jun 22, 1909	Auditorium, Oklahoma City, Oklahoma, U.S.	
80	Win	46–14–15 (5)	Dick Hyland	KO	23 (45)	May 29, 1909	Mission Street Arena, Colma, California, U.S.	Retained world lightweight title
79	Win	45–14–15 (5)	Joe Gans	KO	21 (45)	Sep 9, 1908	Mission Street Arena, Colma, California, U.S.	Retained world lightweight title
78	Win	44–14–15 (5)	Joe Gans	KO	17 (45)	Jul 4, 1908	Mission Street Arena, Colma, California, U.S.	Won world lightweight title
77	Draw	43–14–15 (5)	Abe Attell	PTS	15	Mar 31, 1908	Coliseum, San Francisco, California, U.S.	
76	Draw	43–14–14 (5)	Jimmy Britt	NWS	10	Mar 3, 1908	Naud Junction Pavilion, Los Angeles, California, U.S.	
75	Loss	43–14–13 (5)	Rudy Unholz	NWS	10	Feb 4, 1908	Naud Junction Pavilion, Los Angeles, California, U.S.	
74	Win	43–13–13 (5)	Jack Clifford	KO	5 (20)	Jan 13, 1908	Opera House, Ogden, Utah, U.S.	
73	Loss	42–13–13 (5)	Jimmy Britt	PTS	20	Jul 31, 1907	Auditorium Rink, San Francisco, California, U.S.	Lost world 'white' lightweight title
72	Loss	42–12–13 (5)	Joe Gans	DQ	42 (?)	Sep 3, 1906	Casino Amphitheatre, Goldfield, Nevada, U.S.	For world lightweight title
71	Win	42–11–13 (5)	Terry McGovern	NWS	6	Mar 14, 1906	National A.C., Philadelphia, Pennsylvania, U.S.	
70	Win	41–11–13 (5)	Jimmy Britt	KO	18 (20)	Sep 9, 1905	Mission Street Arena, Colma, California, U.S.	Won world 'white' lightweight title
69	Win	40–11–13 (5)	Jack O'Neil	NWS	6	Jun 6, 1905	National A.C., Philadelphia, Pennsylvania, U.S.	
68	Draw	39–11–13 (5)	Kid Sullivan	PTS	6	Jun 2, 1905	Eureka A.C., Baltimore, Maryland, U.S.	
67	Loss	39–11–12 (5)	Abe Attell	NWS	6	May 22, 1905	National A.C., Philadelphia, Pennsylvania, U.S.	
66	Win	39–10–12 (5)	Young Corbett II	TKO	9 (20)	Feb 28, 1905	Woodward's Pavilion, San Francisco, California, U.S.	
65	Loss	38–10–12 (5)	Jimmy Britt	PTS	20	Dec 20, 1904	Mechanic's Pavilion, San Francisco, California, U.S.	For vacant world 'white' lightweight title
64	Win	38–9–12 (5)	Young Corbett II	TKO	10 (20)	Nov 29, 1904	Woodward's Pavilion, San Francisco, California, U.S.	
63	Win	37–9–12 (5)	Aurelio Herrera	PTS	20	Sep 5, 1904	Montana A.C., Butte, Montana, U.S.	
62	Win	36–9–12 (5)	Eddie Hanlon	TKO	19 (20)	Jul 29, 1904	Woodward's Pavilion, San Francisco, California, U.S.	
61	Win	35–9–12 (5)	Martin Canole	KO	18 (20)	May 20, 1904	Woodward's Pavilion, San Francisco, California, U.S.	
60	Win	34–9–12 (5)	Joe Spider Welsh	TKO	16 (20)	Apr 5, 1904	Salt Palace, Salt Lake City, Utah, U.S.	
59	Win	33–9–12 (5)	Jack O'Neil	PTS	6	Feb 5, 1904	Badger A.C., Milwaukee, Wisconsin, U.S.	
58	Win	32–9–12 (5)	Art Simms	KO	3 (6)	Jan 16, 1904	Milwaukee A.C., Milwaukee, Wisconsin, U.S.	
57	Win	31–9–12 (5)	Clarence English	PTS	15	Dec 28, 1903	Saint Joseph, Missouri, U.S.	
56	Win	30–9–12 (5)	George Memsic	PTS	6	Nov 10, 1903	Badger A.C., Milwaukee, U.S.	
55	Loss	29–9–12 (5)	Charles Neary	PTS	6	Oct 16, 1903	Badger A.C., Milwaukee, U.S.	
54	NC	29–8–12 (5)	Daredevil Tildon	NC	2 (?)	Sep 3, 1903	Chicago, Illinois, U.S.	Police stopped the fight
53	Loss	29–8–12 (4)	Eddie Sterns	KO	9 (?)	Aug 26, 1903	Michigan City, Indiana, U.S.	
52	Draw	29–7–12 (4)	Mickey Riley	PTS	15	Jul 24, 1903	Hurley, Wisconsin, U.S.	
51	NC	29–7–11 (4)	Mickey Riley	NC	11 (?)	Jul 15, 1903	Ashland, Wisconsin, U.S.	Police stopped the fight
50	Draw	29–7–11 (3)	Clarence English	PTS	15	Jun 27, 1903	Kansas City, Missouri, U.S.	
49	Win	29–7–10 (3)	Larry McDonald	KO	4 (?)	Jun 20, 1903	Harvey, Illinois, U.S.	
48	Draw	28–7–10 (3)	Mickey Riley	PTS	6	Jun 19, 1903	Panorama Building, Milwaukee, Wisconsin, U.S.	
47	Win	28–7–9 (3)	Young Scotty	PTS	8	Jun 16, 1903	Fond du Lac, Wisconsin, U.S.	
46	Win	27–7–9 (3)	Stockings Kelly	KO	4 (?)	May 22, 1903	Milwaukee, Wisconsin, U.S.	
45	Win	26–7–9 (3)	Cyclone Johnny Thompson	PTS	6	Apr 24, 1903	Milwaukee A.C., Milwaukee, Wisconsin, U.S.	
44	Draw	25–7–9 (3)	Adam Ryan	PTS	15	Mar 4, 1903	Capital Theater, Little Rock, Arkansas, U.S.	
43	Win	25–7–8 (3)	Sammy Maxwell	KO	10 (?)	Jan 6, 1903	Hot Springs, Arkansas, U.S.	
42	Win	24–7–8 (3)	Christy Williams	KO	17 (?)	Dec 26, 1902	Hot Springs, Arkansas, U.S.	
41	Win	23–7–8 (3)	Billy Mayfield	PTS	10	Dec 2, 1902	Hot Springs, Arkansas, U.S.	
40	Draw	22–7–8 (3)	Battling Hurley	PTS	6	Jun 14, 1902	Hammond, Indiana, U.S.	
39	Win	22–7–7 (3)	Pudden Burns	PTS	6	May 17, 1902	Hegewisch, Illinois, U.S.	
38	Draw	21–7–7 (3)	Danny McMahon	PTS	6	Apr 12, 1902	West Pullman, Illinois, U.S.	
37	Win	21–7–6 (3)	William Rossler	KO	1 (?)	Apr 5, 1902	Harvey, Illinois, U.S.	
36	Win	20–7–6 (3)	Cyclone Johnny Thompson	PTS	6	Mar 21, 1902	Wabash A.C., Chicago, Illinois, U.S.	
35	Win	19–7–6 (3)	Kid Ryan	KO	5 (?)	Mar 17, 1902	American A.C., Chicago, Illinois, U.S.	
34	Win	18–7–6 (3)	Joe Percente	PTS	8	Mar 13, 1902	Oshkosh, Wisconsin, U.S.	
33	Loss	17–7–6 (3)	Charles Berry	PTS	8	Jan 21, 1902	Fond du Lac, Wisconsin, U.S.	
32	Win	17–6–6 (3)	Frank Colifer	KO	5 (?)	Jan 13, 1902	West Pullman, Illinois, U.S.	
31	Loss	16–6–6 (3)	Charles Berry	PTS	6	Dec 17, 1901	Badger A.C., Milwaukee, Wisconsin, U.S.	
30	Win	16–5–6 (3)	Mike Walsh	KO	6 (6)	Dec 16, 1901	American A.C., Chicago, Illinois, U.S.	
29	Draw	15–5–6 (3)	Joe Percente	PTS	6	Dec 2, 1901	Milwaukee Boxing Club, Milwaukee, Wisconsin, U.S.	
28	Loss	15–5–5 (3)	Eddie Santry	PTS	6	Nov 29, 1901	Pyramid A.C., Chicago, Illinois, U.S.	
27	Loss	15–4–5 (3)	Joe Percente	PTS	6	Nov 15, 1901	Milwaukee, Wisconsin, U.S.	
26	NC	15–3–5 (3)	Billy Heck	ND	4	Nov 10, 1901	West Pullman, Wisconsin, U.S.	
25	Draw	15–3–5 (2)	Harry Fails	PTS	10	May 24, 1901	Rhinelander, Wisconsin, U.S.	
24	NC	15–3–4 (2)	Harry Fails	ND	6	May 18, 1901	Omro, Wisconsin, U.S.	
23	Draw	15–3–4 (1)	Charles Berry	PTS	6	May 3, 1901	Milwaukee Boxing Club, Milwaukee, Wisconsin, U.S.	
22	Loss	15–3–3 (1)	Mickey Riley	PTS	6	Apr 19, 1901	Milwaukee, Wisconsin, U.S.	
21	Win	15–2–3 (1)	Black Griffo	KO	3 (?)	Mar 17, 1901	Chicago, Illinois, U.S.	
20	Win	14–2–3 (1)	Jack Martin	PTS	4	Dec 8, 1900	Chicago, Illinois, U.S.	
19	Win	13–2–3 (1)	Joe Percente	DQ	2 (?)	Dec 7, 1900	Star Theatre, Chicago, Illinois, U.S.	
18	Draw	12–2–3 (1)	Danny McMahon	PTS	4	Dec 1, 1900	Chicago, Illinois, U.S.	
17	Loss	12–2–2 (1)	Pete Boyle	DQ	4 (?)	Dec 1, 1900	Chicago, Illinois, U.S.	
16	Win	12–1–2 (1)	Ed Burley	KO	5 (?)	Nov 22, 1900	Chicago, Illinois, U.S.	
15	Win	11–1–2 (1)	Black Griffo	KO	3 (?)	Nov 15, 1900	Chicago, Illinois, U.S.	
14	Draw	10–1–2 (1)	Clarence Class	PTS	6	Nov 2, 1900	Chicago, Illinois, U.S.	
13	Win	10–1–1 (1)	Young Bay	PTS	6	Oct 8, 1900	Chicago, Illinois, U.S.	
12	Win	9–1–1 (1)	Young Griffin	PTS	6	Sep 21, 1900	Orpheus A.C., Chicago, Illinois, U.S.	
11	Loss	8–1–1 (1)	Joe Hedmark	PTS	6	Sep 14, 1900	Star Theatre, Chicago, Illinois, U.S.	
10	Win	8–0–1 (1)	Charles Dougherty	KO	1 (?)	Aug 30, 1900	Star Theatre, Chicago, Illinois, U.S.	
9	NC	7–0–1 (1)	Feathers Vernon	ND	6	Jul 4, 1900	West Pullman, Illinois, U.S.	
8	Win	7–0–1	John Smith	KO	2 (?)	Jun 1, 1899	Chicago, Illinois, U.S.	
7	Win	6–0–1	Bull Winters	KO	1 (?)	May 3, 1899	Chicago, Illinois, U.S.	
6	Win	5–0–1	Eddie Penny	KO	1 (?)	Apr 6, 1899	Chicago, Illinois, U.S.	
5	Draw	4–0–1	Eddie Herman	PTS	6	Jan 1, 1899	Hegewisch, Illinois, U.S.	
4	Win	4–0	Soldier Williams	KO	3 (?)	May 11, 1898	Sioux Falls, South Dakota, U.S.	
3	Win	3–0	Freddie Green	KO	7 (?)	May 10, 1898	Sioux Falls, South Dakota, U.S.	
2	Win	2–0	Ole Olsen	PTS	3	Jun 5, 1897	Hegewisch, Illinois, U.S.	
1	Win	1–0	Wallace Kid	KO	1 (?)	Sep 3, 1896	Hammond, Indiana, U.S.	

== See also ==
- Lineal championship

Achievements
Preceded by Joe Gans	World Lightweight Champion; July 4, 1908 – February 22, 1910	Succeeded by Ad Wolgast
Titles in pretence
Preceded by Jimmy Britt	World White Lightweight Champion; September 9, 1905 – July 31, 1907	Succeeded by Jimmy Britt
