= Fay King (cartoonist) =

American cartoonist

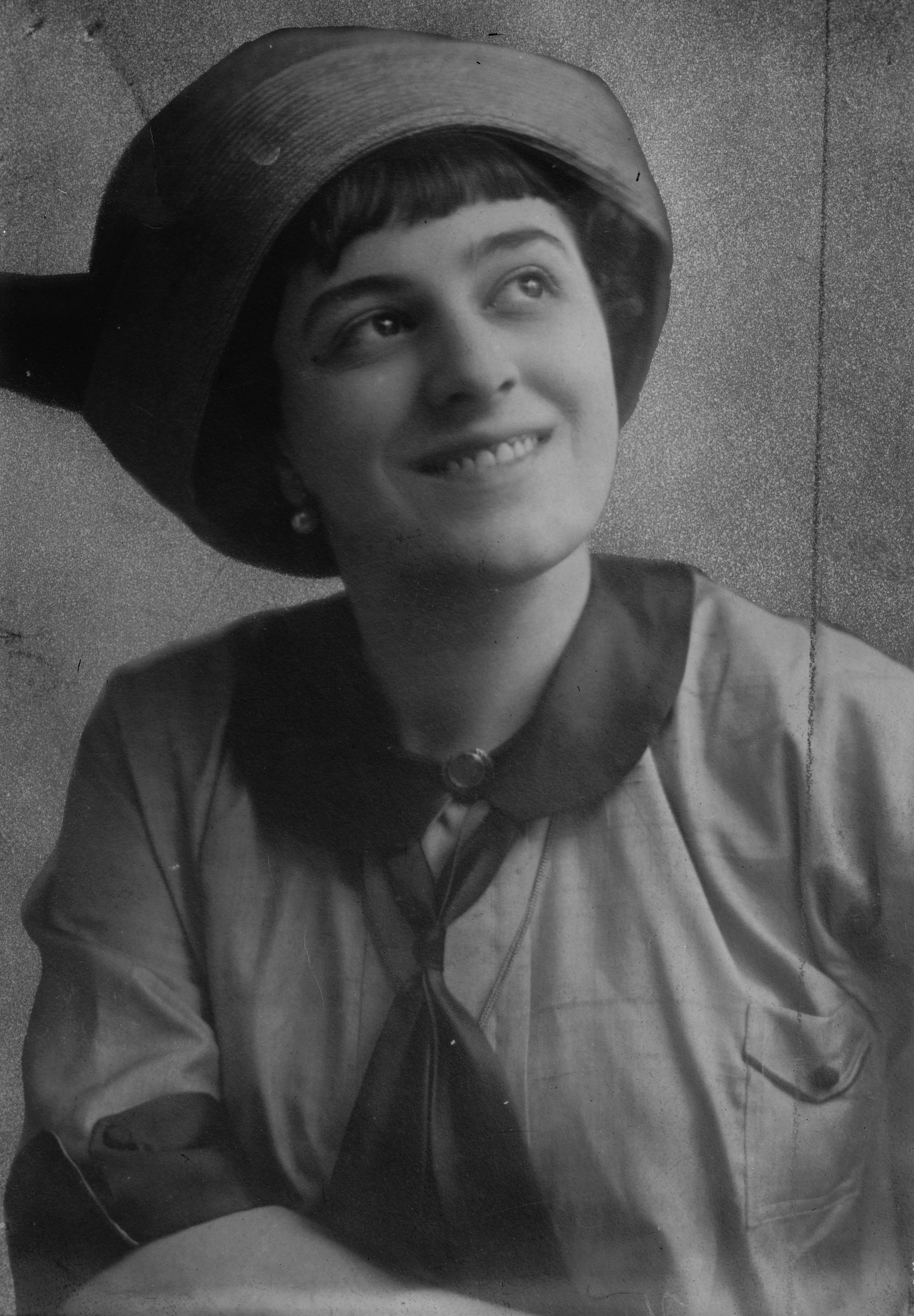
- Fay King circa 1913
- Born: March 1889; Seattle, Washington, U.S.
- Died: Unknown
- Known for: illustration, cartoons, reportage
- Spouse: Oscar "Battling" Nelson (1913–1916)

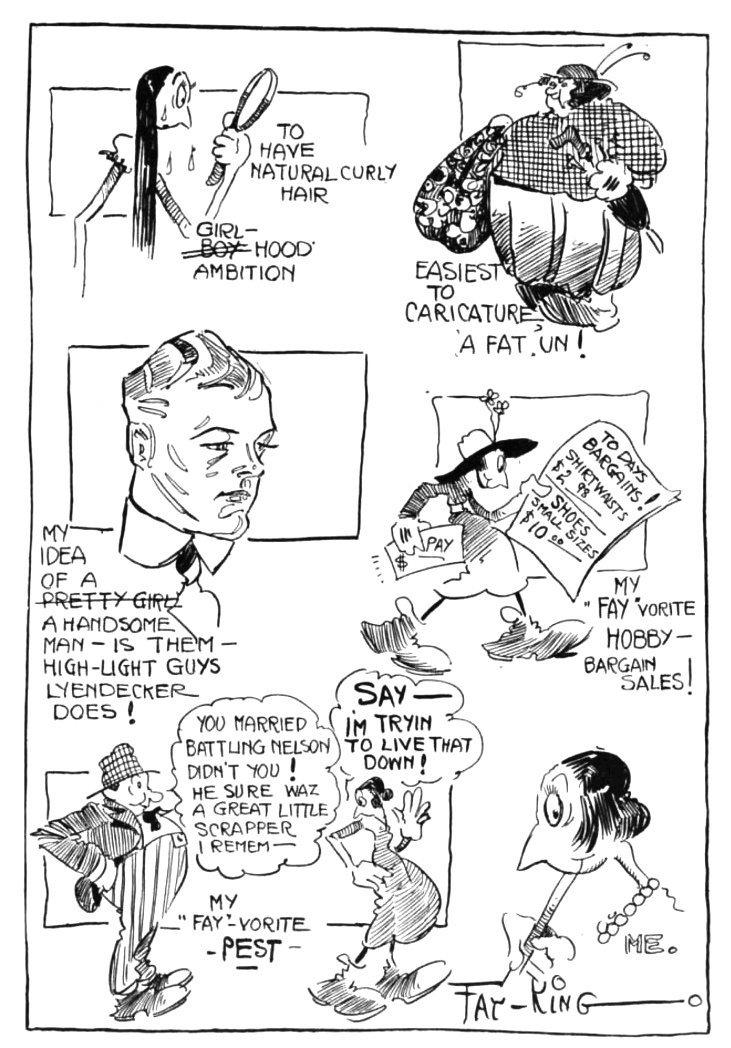
1918 autobio strip ("Cartoonist's Confessional", in Cartoons Magazine). Second-to-last cartoon refers to her marriage with boxer Oscar "Battling" Nelson.

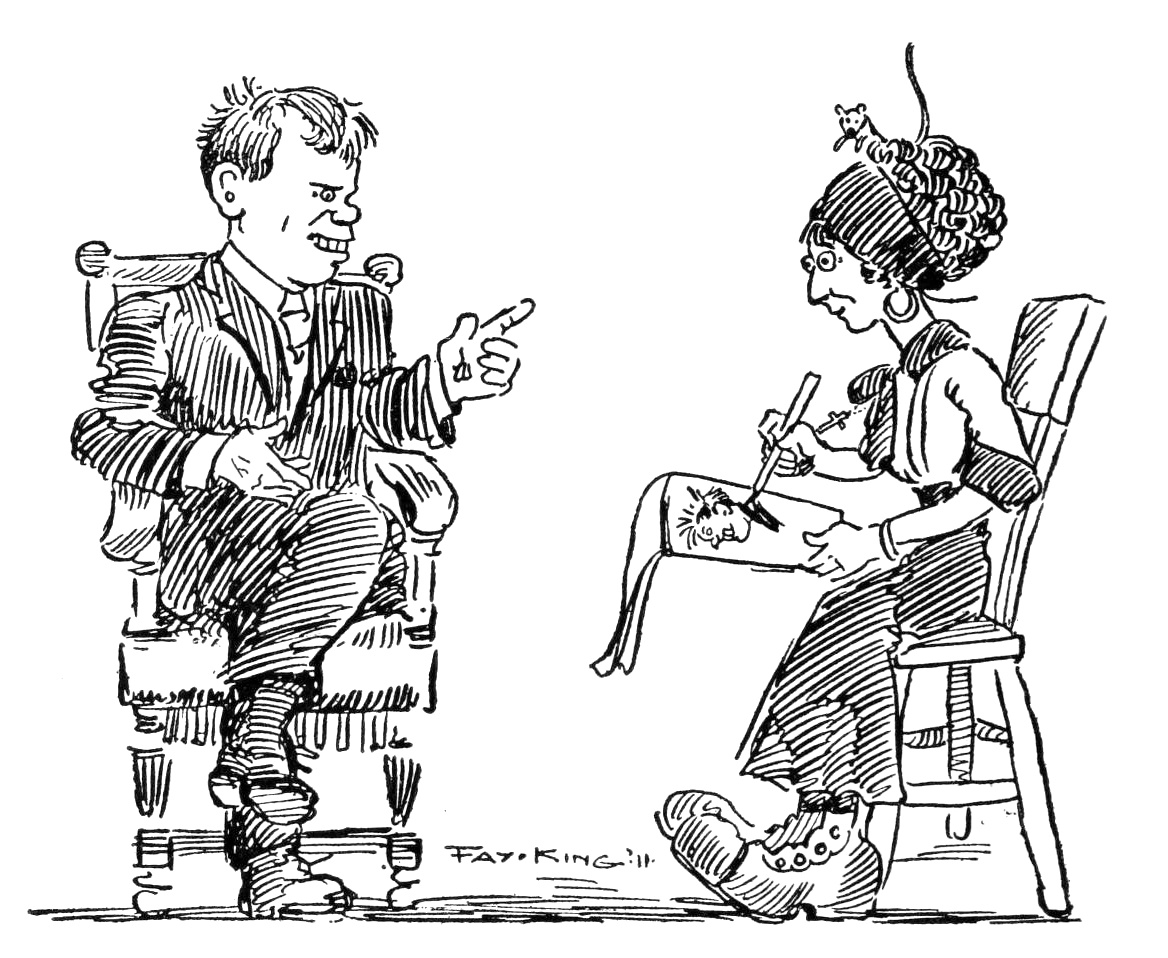
1911 self-cartoon of her future husband (Oscar "Battling" Nelson) and herself.

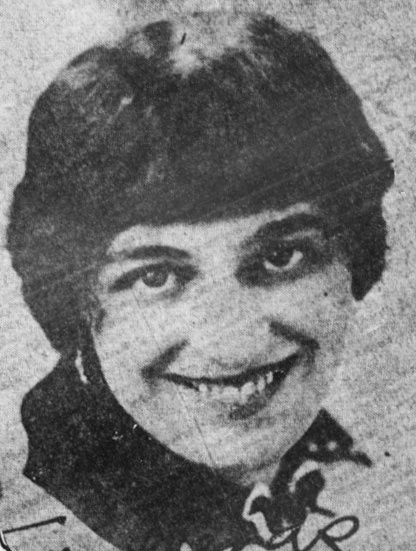
Fay King in 1913.

Fay Barbara King (March 1889 – after 1954) was an American illustrator, journalist, and cartoonist. Some of her work represents an early example of autobiographical comics.

King worked for newspapers and magazines in the early twentieth century (at least from 1912 to 1937), moving to New York City in 1918. She was one of the popular Jazz Age cartoonists appearing in the 1924 comedy The Great White Way.

== Biography ==
King was born in Seattle, Washington in March 1889, to John and Ella King. She was raised in Portland, Oregon, and went to college at Seattle University. The young King was adventurous, being one of the first women in the Portland area to own an automobile, and in 1912 had announced plans for a balloon ascension with noted early parachutist Georgia "Tiny" Broadwick, before the plan was rejected by her parents, according to an article in The Oregonian.

King's father had been an employee at a Turkish bath, as well a trainer of athletes, and she seems to have had a deep affinity for sport. King married boxer Oscar "Battling" Nelson in 1913, in the Hegewisch neighborhood of Chicago. Their 1916 divorce was widely covered by the press. The Veteran Boxing Association paid for part of the cost of Nelson's 1954 funeral; King paid the remainder, in addition to purchasing "beautiful arrangements" for the ceremony.

King worked for The Denver Post from April 1912 to 1918, where she produced both cartoons and feature articles, including a 1916 profile of fellow journalist Elsie Lincoln Benedict (then known as Elsie Vandegrift). She left Denver for The San Francisco Examiner in 1918 and later became a feature writer and cartoonist for the New York Evening Journal.

In 1924, she appeared as herself in the comedy The Great White Way (alongside other cartoonists, such as Winsor McCay and George McManus).

== Work ==
King's cartoons are recalled as an early example of autobiographical comics within the genre of newspaper cartooning. She frequently depicted herself in her comics, using a spindly, gangly caricature that bore a strong resemblance to the character of Olive Oyl, who would later be created by E.C. Segar for his Thimble Theater strip.

In addition to her autobiographical reporting, she is known to have created two strips, both of which ran in the New-York Mirror: "Mazie" (which ran briefly in 1924) and "Girls Will Be Girls" (which ran between 1924 and 1925).
