= Marta Laan =

Estonian actress (born 1985)

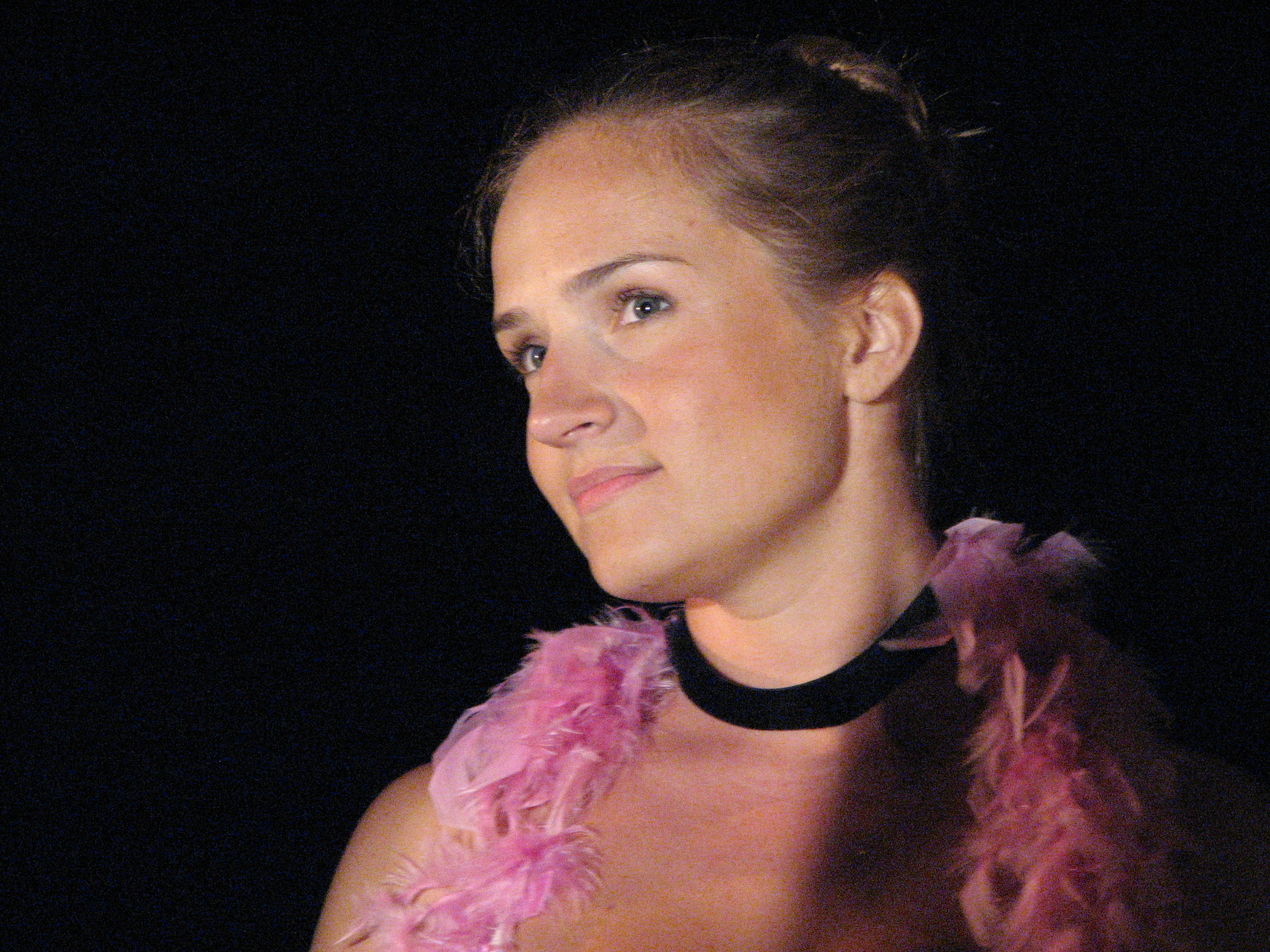
- Born: 20 May 1985 (age 41); Tallinn, Estonia
- Occupation: Actress
- Years active: 2007–present

Marta Laan (born 20 May 1985) is an Estonian stage, television, and film actress whose career began in the late 2000s.

== Early life and education ==
Marta Laan was born and raised in Tallinn, where she attended primary and secondary schools. In 2006, she enrolled in the performing arts department of the Estonian Academy of Music and Theatre to study acting under course supervisor Hendrik Toompere Jr., graduating in 2010. Among her graduating classmates were: Mikk Jürjens, Liis Haab, Lauri Kaldoja, Liisa Pulk, Roland Laos, Hendrik Toompere Jr. Jr., Sandra Uusberg-Üksküla, and Kristjan Üksküla.

== Acting career ==
=== Stage ===
In the autumn of 2010, after graduation from the Estonian Academy of Music and Theatre, Laan became engaged as an actress at the Estonian Drama Theatre in Tallinn, where she is still currently employed. Laan's diploma production roles include Girls' School Teacher and Typist in a production of Nikolai Evreinov's 1921 play The Chief Thing, Margarita in Mikhail Bulgakov's The Master and Margarita, and as Hannah Jarvis in Tom Stoppard's Arcadia.

Laan has gone on to appear in roles in productions at the Estonian Drama Theatre by such varied international authors and playwrights as: Tracy Letts, William Shakespeare, Ernest Hemingway, Anton Chekhov, David Edgar, Jordi Galceran, Jane Bowles, Nina Raine, Fyodor Dostoevsky, Jean Anouilh, Tena Štivičić, and Maxim Gorky. Roles at the theatre by Estonian authors and playwrights include those of: Martin Algus, Indrek Hargla, and Andrus Kivirähk.

Additionally, Laan has performed in productions at the Tallinn City Theatre, Theatre NO99, the R.A.A.A.M, the Von Krahl Theatre, as well as several smaller venues.

=== Film ===
Marta Laan's most significant feature film role to date was a small role in the 2008 René Vilbre-directed crime-drama Mina olin siin, based on the 2005 novel Mina olin siin. Esimene arest by Estonian author Sass Henno. She has also appeared in several short films and student films.

=== Television ===
Laan's first significant television role was as the character Johanna in a 2007 episode of the Eesti Televisioon (ETV) crime series Ohtlik lend. In 2009, she joined the ensemble cast of the popular the TV3 drama series Kodu keset linna as Betti; a role which she played until the series ended in 2012. In 2009, she appeared in a small role as a secretary on the TV3 comedy-crime series Kättemaksukontor, then again in 2013 in two episodes as the character Sandra Viliroo. In 2010, she joined the cast of the ETV comedy series ENSV as the character Anneli. In 2014, she had a recurring role on the series as Laura Lausma for approximately eight episodes. The same year, she made an appearance on the long-running ETV drama series Õnne 13. Also, in 2014, she began a starring role as Anne on the Kanal 2 comedy series Parim enne. In 2015, she appeared as Juuli Lumi in several episodes of the TV3 crime-mystery series Keeris.

In 2017, Laan was a contestant on TV3's Su nägu kõlab tuttavalt, the Estonian version of Your Face Sounds Familiar, an interactive reality television franchise series where celebrity contestants impersonate singers. Laan's impersonations included Etta James, Getter Jaani, Lana Del Rey, Florence Foster Jenkins, Verka Serduchka, and Salvador Sobral, among others. Laan ultimately finished in third place behind actress and singer Hele Kõrve and composer and singer Valter Soosalu.

Since 2026, she has been co-presenting Taskmaster - kuninga käsul, the Estonian TV3 version of the British comedy-game show Taskmaster alongside Kristjan Jõekalda, serving as his assistant.

== Acknowledgements ==
- Voldemar Panso Award (2008)
- Estonian Drama Theatre Prize, Supporting Actress (2014)
