= Estonian Forest Aid =

Estonian civic movement towards sustainable forest management

Estonian Forest Aid (EFA, Estonian: Eesti Metsa Abiks, alternative English translation: Helping Estonia's Forests) is an Estonian civic movement which advocates sustainable forest management and draws attention to problems associated with Estonian forestry policy in general. A non-profit organisation under the same name (Eesti Metsa Abiks) has been registered by activists from the movement in the Estonian Business Register in June 2017. Since January 2018, EFA belongs to the social chamber of the FSC-s representative organization in Estonia.

== Origins of movement and background ==
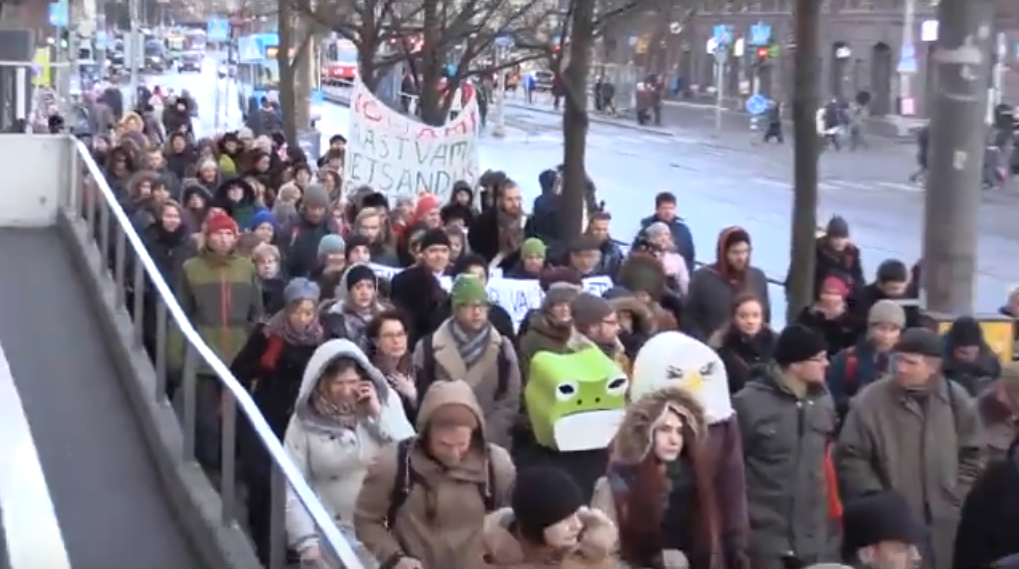
March on December 16, 2016

The movement considers its beginning to have been a demonstration on December 16, 2016 during which a march started in front of the Ministry of the Environment and ended in front of the Riigikogu (the Estonian parliament). Estimates of the number of participants in the demonstration range from 100 to 1000. Its purpose was to oppose the planned amendment to the Forest Act, according to which the rotation age of spruce wood was to be lowered and other cutting restrictions alleviated. One of the purposes was also to generally oppose the direction in which Estonian forestry policy was heading, deviating from the path of sustainability and able to viewed as promotion of industrial interests, according to critics. The incentive of organising the demonstration, however, is said to have been the Estonian Ministry of the Environment's withdrawal from an agreement according to which the lower rotation age of spruce stands was to be compensated by fulfilling the protection needs of fresh boreal forests and fresh boreo-nemoral forests, as well as the small-scale coverage, especially in the national media, of an open letter sent to the Riigikogu, to ministers and to the President of Estonia on December 1 by 101 cultural figures criticising the forest policy and urging them to reject the amendment to the Forest Act.

== Programme of the movement ==
The public programme of the EFA consists of political, social, ecological and economic parts.

- The part of the programme concerning political aspects foresees the Estonian Ministry of the Environment returning to its proclaimed aim, which is "to instil a responsible attitude towards nature and to preserve a clean and naturally diverse living environment for the people of Estonia". To attain this objective, it is desirable to improve the proportion of personnel with an environmental education background in the management of the Ministry and its subdivisions. Staying on the path of the sustainable model that forms the legal basis of Estonia's forestry policy is also desired. According to this model, the economic sphere must function within a socially acceptable framework and society shall not exert excessive pressure on the environment, otherwise there is a risk that future generations may not be able to enjoy current environmental benefits. In practice, this means more comprehensive and balanced inclusion policies with real impact. Additionally, it is recommended to disclose the forestry development plan in advance and to carry out a complete inventory of Estonian forests to bring an end to widespread confusion concerning the prescribed cut, the volume of growing stock and similar issues.
- The part of the programme regarding social aspects voices the intent to involve local governments in the state's planning of cutting to the extent that decision-making powers be vested in local governments in terms of the use of specific forests to achieve balanced, versatile forestry use that is as acceptable to all parties as possible. Information about the diverse nature of forests, as well as social and ecological dimensions, is to be disseminated among private forest owners, and broader opportunities for compromises are to be sought.
- The part of the programme regarding the environment specifies the need for additional supervision of dangers posing a risk to biodiversity to introduce protective measures more quickly. Ornithologists have suggested the idea of a spring-summer logging ban to protect wildlife during their nesting period, and this is also supported by the programme. Elsewhere, the EFA has expressed its explicit support for a four-month logging ban proposed in 2000 by five scientific and nature protection organisations. This part of the programme also insists on protected areas fulfilling management objectives regarding wildlife protection and that woodlands be planned as an integrated whole.
- The part of the programme regarding the economy stipulates that forest management principles provided by the law shall be implemented in practice, i.e. "efficient forest management, understood as economical production and the short-term as well as long-term use of all forest-related benefits". As a separate point, taking the development opportunities of nature tourism into account is highlighted. The last point of the part concerning the economy provides that natural resources shall be valorised to reap the benefits, again illustrating the principle of the EFA according to which sustainable use brings greater benefits.

== Members ==
Members who have made media appearances as coordinators of the EFA include Linda-Mari Väli, Madis Messimas (water programme), Indrek Vainu (special solutions), Veljo Värk (bogs programme) and Martin Luiga. Sven Anton is the organisation's in-house lawyer. As of May 2017, close to 1000 members had formally joined the organisation. However, by November 2017, its Facebook group had nearly 6000 members. The EFA's website states that anyone who agrees with the organisation's objectives and their ways of attaining them can consider themselves a member.

== Activities ==
=== Proposed Keretü protection area ===
On February 20, the EFA accused the Ministry of Defence of pressuring the Ministry of the Environment to delay establishing Keretü protection area so as to ensure that its

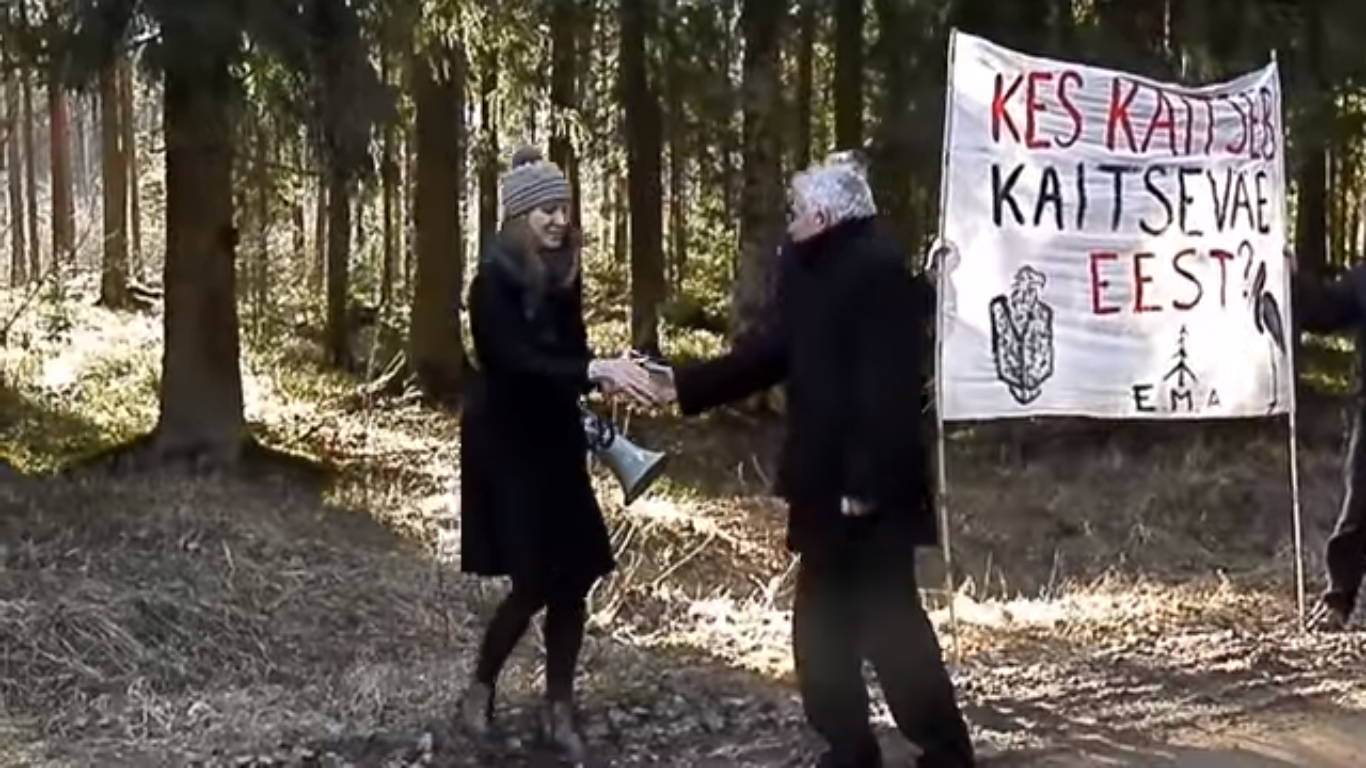
An information meeting of the EFA at the entrance of Nursipalu military training area on the day of a visit of the National Defence Committee of the Riigikogu.

protection regime would not derail the expansion of the military training area or the creation of a mortar shooting range. According to the EFA, such a course of events is unacceptable and careless in regard to the area's natural heritage, whereas the Ministry of the Environment felt that the environmental impact assessment of the training area could even improve the development of the nature conservation area and that the Estonian Environmental Board had the right to limit all activity that could harm local natural heritage. The EFA thereupon made a new declaration in which it demanded that the natural conservation area be created on the basis of the initial borders set in the expert analysis in 2013; that the deforestation of surrounding forests be avoided; and that instead of in Nursipalu, the mortar training area be established in Sirgala as its natural environment had already suffered heavy damage due to the mining of oil shale. On March 23, Nursipalu training area was visited by the National Defence Committee of the Riigikogu, who were met by a group of EFA activists at the entrance of the training area to remind them of the area's natural heritage and of the opposition of the municipality and its citizens to changes in the natural environment.

On November 6, the EFA communicated to the public that in cooperation with the local civil group Inimsõbralik Nursipalu (People-Friendly Nursipalu) it had taken legal action against the salvage permits for Nursipalu because the environmental impact assessment of the infrastructure of the shooting range had not been completed, and therefore the planning that should have formed the permit's basis had not been carried out. The EFA estimated that attempts had been made to carry out the deforestation in a hurry and in secret. Three days earlier, the Estonian Chamber of Environmental Associations also addressed the deforestation issue in a critical tone.

=== Campaign against pulp mill ===
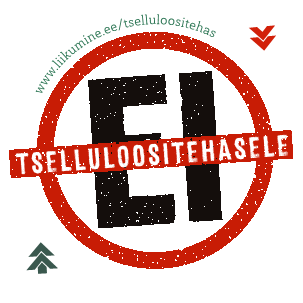
Anti-pulp mill information sticker of the EFA

The EFA has also been strongly critical of the pulp mill planned for construction close to Tartu. Anti-pulp mill campaigning was launched on April 3, 2017 when the EFA sent a public declaration to four ministers and to the Environment Committee of the Riigikogu requesting that special plans of the state not be drawn up, and in the event that they nevertheless were drawn up, that the EFA be involved in pre-selecting the location of the planned mill. The organisation also wanted the planning intentions of the pulp mill to be preceded by a broad survey by independent experts to determine whether the construction of the mill would be possible without excessively burdening Estonia's forest resources. Four days later, a declaration was delivered to the mayor of Tartu and to the Tartu county governor indicating that prior to determining the location of the pulp mill next to the Emajõgi River, local residents’ opinions should be canvassed, noting that the company which instigated the plan had not shown any interest in residents’ views. A few days after this, on April 12, Est-For Invest OÜ held an information meeting at the Estonian University of Life Sciences at which Linda-Mari Väli, the coordinator of the EFA, wore a themed T-shirt and reminded Aadu Polli that according to an OECD report, Estonia suffers from dangerously high rates of forest exploitation and that besides the pulp mill there is a risk of emergence of other enterprises with a demand for raw timber. Polli replied that the pulp mill would only use wood that was otherwise destined for export.

On May 1, the organisation arranged a hike from the Tartu district of Supilinn to Vorbuse to examine the natural environment in the potential construction area of the pulp mill. Around a dozen activists took part in the event, during which a rare kingfisher was spotted and a conversation was had with local residents, who told TV3 reporters that they did not want the pulp mill to be built. Two weeks later, a larger demonstration was organised on Town Hall Square in Tartu. Among the participants were Urmas Klaas, the Mayor of Tartu; actress Merle Jääger; poets Kristiina Ehin, poets Contra and Aapo Ilves; and Mika Keränen, an author of children's books. Themed poetry was recited, songs were sung and critical speeches were given.

In September 2017, the EFA brought an action in which they requested that the administrative Acts associated with the construction of the pulp mill be declared null and void, stating that the volume of raw materials and water consumption and the pollution risk itself sufficed to consider, at the social level, the option of not constructing the mill.

=== Forests on Lake Harku's western shore ===
On July 28, the EFA contested a clearcutting licence for Lake Harku’s western shore because according to the rural municipality’s comprehensive plan, said shore was defined as greenfield land to be managed using a method other than clearcutting. On August 15, a discussion took place at the Environmental Board between the Board, Harku municipality, the local community and the EFA, the representative of the landowner being the sole party to submit their opinion in writing. The views of citizens, the municipality and the EFA were the same and the Environmental Board declared the licence null and void. For potential future improvement cutting and shelterwood cutting permitted in the municipality's comprehensive plan, it was advised to include experts to ensure that the quality of the greenfield land as a biodiversity conserver, windbreak and rainwater filter is maintained.

=== EFA audit of NEPCon regarding State Forest Management Centre FSC certificate ===
On October 16, 2017 the EFA submitted for a NEPCon audit of the State Forest Management Centre the cases of forest management malpractice that it had collated during the year and that indicated direct violations of the FSC Forest Management Certificate and acute conflicts between local residents’ interests and the forest cutting carried out in their region, as well as to various shortcomings in ensuring the sustainability of ecosystems.

The EFA also drew attention to wrongful acts committed by the state forest managers: destroying yews protected by nature protection law; cuttings carried out in the conservation zone of Karula National Park; inadequate engagement of local inhabitants when planning cutting in Viimsi and Taevaskoda; errors in compliance with several sustainable forestry requirements or the Forest Act concerning a number of specific logging cases; and letters from nature tourism entrepreneurs and beekeepers in which interest groups spoke up against the current forestry practices of the State Forest Management Centre. The audit was illustrated with photos, media articles and extracts of correspondence between the State Forest Management Centre and citizens.

=== Sustainable Forestry Conference ===
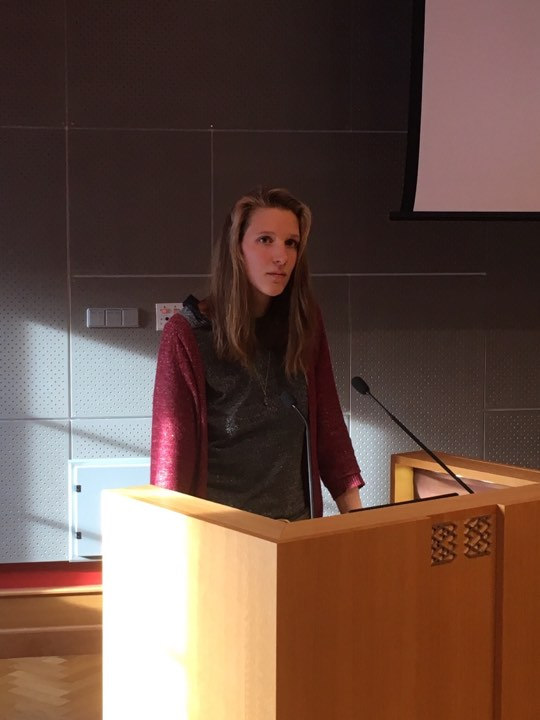
Coordinator Linda-Mari Väli making a presentation.

On October 25th2017 the Sustainable Forestry Conference was held in the Riigikogu's conference hall in cooperation between the EFA, the University of Tartu and the Environment Committee of the Riigikogu. Presentations were made by Anneli Palo and Asko Lõhmus, scientists from the University of Tartu; Tarmo Tüür, the Chairman of the Estonian Fund for Nature; EFA coordinator Linda-Mari Väli; Marika Mann, the founder, owner and CEO of the nature tourism enterprise Estonian Nature Tours (:et); and Hasso Krull, a cultural theoretician. Anneli Palo's presentation covered the historical development of Estonian forests, drawing attention to the fact that the proportion of real virgin forest constitutes just 2% of total forest area in the country. The Chairman of the Estonian Fund for Nature pointed out as well the small extent of old forests, cast doubt on the protection of sites deemed eligible for conservation, and presented a proposal to amend the Nature Conservation Act being prepared by the Estonian Fund for Nature so as to provide a minimum system of protection that could not be negatively affected by amending (with regulations) the legal definitions of cutting. Linda-Mari Väli, the coordinator of the General Programme of the EFA, presented its initial version of the next forestry development plan, calling it a "compensatory development plan" that would counterbalance the social and ecological damage done by the current, intensive development plan. During the second part of the conference, Marika Mann showcased the unused potential of nature tourism in Estonia and the country's unique position as a birdwatching destination, emphasising (with the rest of the world as an example) the need for state support in developing nature tourism. Hasso Krull presented the concept of natural capital of the British economist Dieter Helm. This concept attributes the highest value to renewable natural resources: clean air and water and natural biotic communities. Examples Krull highlighted included comparison of the price of locally produced drinking water to that of imported drinking water, the price of conserving bogs to restoring them and the price of clear-cut forest to the price of standing timber. In the last presentation of the day, Asko Lõhmus revealed the results of a study where a working group of conservation biologists placed official forest statistics under scrutiny, using a thousand random sites for research. The results confirmed the scientists’ long-held suspicions that the forest statistics presented by the government are inaccurate and give a more positive depiction of the situation than exists in reality. The research is planned to continue and its raw data to be published.

=== Other ===
On July 26, 2017 the EFA communicated their objections to the exclusion from protection of three parks in Tallinn; the city district government of Pirita endorsed the EFA's position regarding Windeck Park.

== Recognition ==
On January 25, 2018 the EFA was presented with the Keskkonnategu (‘environmental deed’) people's choice award by the Ministry of the Environment. Linda-Mari Väli, coordinator, has received praise for her work in the EFA from the Estonian Fund for Nature: she was awarded the 2016 Young Environmentalist of the Year special mention. Väli also placed 20th among Ekspress Meedia’s top 20 most influential people (Eesti Mõjukad 2017) regarding rural development.

== Criticism ==
On March 24, 2017, in an article entitled Tunne oma vaenlast ("Know Your Enemy"), journalist Mari Kartau accused the EFA of incompetence, radicalism and discourtesy. However, the audit later presented to NEPCon by the EFA in respect of the State Forest Management Centre's infringements was called "comprehensive" by Kartau. Upon the selection of Linda-Mari Väli, the coordinator of the EFA, as one of Ekspress Meedia's top 20 most influential people regarding rural development, Kartau noted that Väli had acquired basic knowledge in forestry and that her opinion should therefore be taken into account.

On October 11, when the dismissal of the complaint concerning the procurement documents of the pulp mill was appealed in the district court, Minister of the Environment Siim Kiisler issued a press release stating that the EFA in its activities was "inciting conflict and enmity", "destructive" and "irresponsible" and that its appeal was "absurd". Linda-Mari Väli, the coordinator of the EFA, responded that the Minister's declaration saddened her and that the Minister had misunderstood the EFA's aspirations. She also felt that his declaration contained misleading allegations. The EFA's lawyer added that court cases were the only way of generating discussion in the given situation because decisions to date had been made "behind closed doors".
