= Mikk Jürjens =

Estonian actor and singer

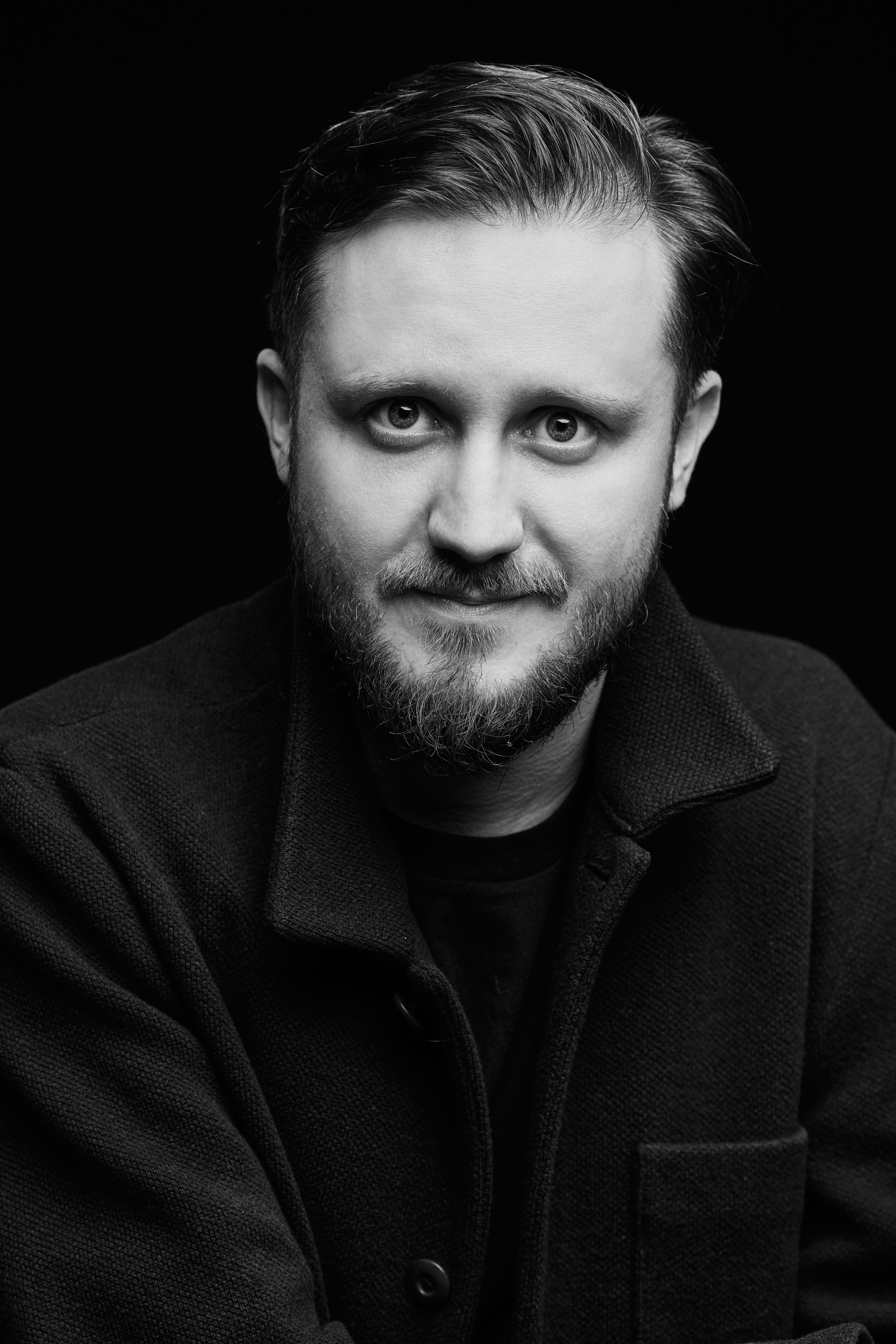
- Mikk Jürjens in 2022
- Born: 11 January 1987 (age 39); Rapla, then part of Estonian SSR, Soviet Union
- Occupations: Actor, singer
- Years active: 2007–present
- Spouse: Mari Pokinen (2014–present)
- Children: 3

Mikk Jürjens (born 11 January 1987) is an Estonian stage, television, film, and voice actor, singer, and television presenter whose career began in the mid-2000s.

== Early life and education ==
Mikk Jürjens was born and raised in the town of Rapla in Rapla County. In 2006, he enrolled in the performing arts department of the Estonian Academy of Music and Theatre in Tallinn to study acting under course supervisor Hendrik Toompere Jr., graduating in 2010. Among his graduating classmates were: Marta Laan, Liis Haab, Lauri Kaldoja, Liisa Pulk, Roland Laos, Hendrik Toompere Jr. Jr., Sandra Uusberg-Üksküla, and Kristjan Üksküla.

== Career ==
=== Stage ===
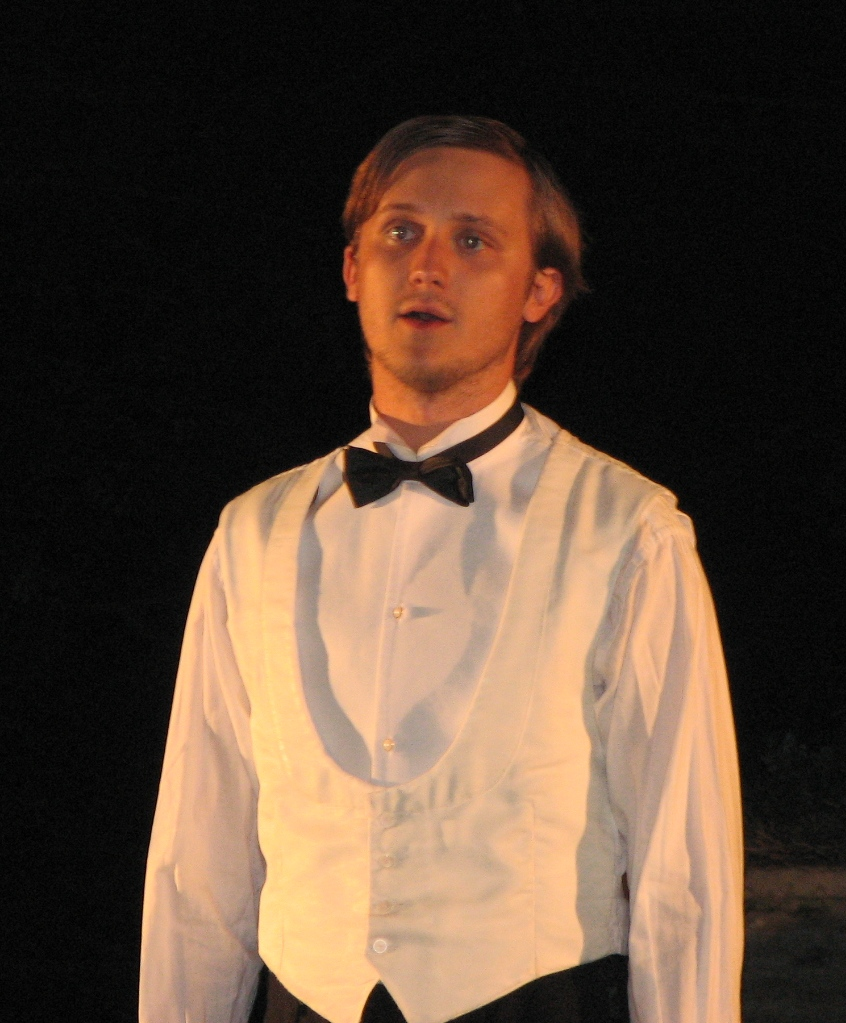
Jürjens in 2011

Following his graduation from the Estonian Academy of Music and Theatre in 2010, he joined the Tallinn City Theatre the same year, where he is currently still engaged. Among his more memorable roles in theatre were in works by: A. H. Tammsaare, Peter Barnes, J. B. Priestley, David Hare, Alexander Pushkin, Richard Greenberg, David Lindsay-Abaire, William Shakespeare, Otfried Preußler, John Steinbeck, Marina Carr, and Ferenc Molnár. During his career, Jürjens has also appeared in stage productions at many of the more notable theatres in Tallinn: the Estonian Drama Theatre, Theatre NO99, the Estonian National Opera, the R.A.A.A.M. theatre, and the Von Krahl Theatre, as well as the Ugala theatre in Viljandi, and several smaller theatres throughout Estonia.

=== Film and television ===
Mikk Jürjens film career began in 2010 with a role in the Hardi Keerutaja-directed short student film Ei oska filmi teha opposite Pääru Oja and Viire Valdma. This was followed by several other short films, and in 2011 he voiced the character Tik the Moon Rabbit in the Heiki Ernits and Janno Põldma-directed animated children's film Lotte ja kuukivi saladus, which was the second full-length feature film of the popular Estonian Lotte franchise. Jürjens has also worked as voice actor in two other Estonian animated films: the Martinus Daane Klemet-directed XYZtopia, and the Mait Laas-directed puppet opera feature film Lisa Limone ja Maroc Orange: tormakas armulugu, both released in 2013.

Jürjens' first significant television role was as the character Hans Palik in two episodes of the Kanal 2 crime-drama series Kelgukoerad in 2013. From 2014 until 2015, he played the recurring character Mart Noormets on the Kanal 2 crime series Viimane võmm and revived the role for an episode of the follow-up series Siberi võmm in 2016. Between 2013 and 2016, he also made several guest appearances on the TV3 comedy-crime series Kättemaksukontor. In 2017 he joined the cast of the Eesti Televisioon (ETV) ten-part drama series Pank, which follows the rise and subsequent misfortunes of a new bank that which emerges in Estonia in the 1990s. Apart from acting, in 2012, he was the presenter for the long-running ETV children's singing competition Laulukarussell, and has hosted and directed several children's television programs.

In 2023, he began appearing in a starring role as Peeter Paul in the Liis Lindmaa-directed ETV comedy series Elu võimalikkusest maal opposite actress Helena Lotman.

== Personal life ==
Mikk Jürjens had been in a relationship with singer and actress Mari Pokinen since 2010. The couple wed in Rapla in April 2014 and have three children; twin boys born in 2014 and a son born in 2017.
