= Pulk (surname) =

Family name

Origin
- Language: Estonian
- Meaning: peg, stick
- Region of origin: Estonia

Pulk is an Estonian surname meaning peg and stick.

As of 1 January 2023, 146 men and 164 women in Estonia bear the surname Pulk. Pulk is ranked as the 475th most common surname for men in Estonia, and 452nd for women. The surname Pulk is most commonly found in Saare County, where 10.42 per 10,000 inhabitants of the county bear the surname.

Notable people bearing the surname Pulk include:

- Aleksander Pulk (1886–1941), Estonian military major general
- Hindrek Pulk (born 1990), Estonian volleyball player
- Liisa Pulk (born 1985), Estonian actress
