= Triin Tenso =

Estonian actress and filmmaker

Triin Tenso (born 1987) is an Estonian stage, film and television actress and filmmaker.

Tenso began her career in the prominent role of Kerli in the 2007 Ilmar Raag-directed drama The Class, which focused on the sustained bullying of two boys at a secondary school that ultimately leads to a school shooting. The following year, Tenso joined the cast of the popular, long-running Eesti Televisioon (ETV) drama series Õnne 13 as the character Sonja and appeared in the role of Kelly in the René Vilbre directed drama Mina olin siin. In 2010, she reprised her role of Kerli for Klass: Elu pärast, a television miniseries that follows up on the aftermath of the school shooting in the film The Class.

In addition to acting, Tenso has worked in a variety of positions on a number of films and television series, such as a focus puller, lighting technician, camera assistant, still photographer, first assistant director, assistant director, script supervisor and gaffer.

== Selected filmography ==
- 2007 Klass (feature film; role: Kerli)
- 2009 Mina olin siin (feature film; role: Kelly)
- 2008-2017 Õnne 13 (television series; role: waitress Sonja)
- 2010-2016 Kättemaksukontor (television series; role: Riin Sivet / Reti)
- 2010: Klass: Elu pärast (television mini-series; role: Kerli)
- 2015-2017 Vabad mehed (television series; role: Reet Võrask)
