= Our Erika =

2026 Estonian biographical drama film

- Estonian promotional poster
- Estonian: Meie Erika
- Directed by: German Golub
- Screenplay by: German Golub; Mehis Pihla
- Produced by: Manfred Vainokivi; Marju Lepp
- Starring: Karolin Jürise; Erki Laur; Milena Mishkevich; Kristin Prits
- Cinematography: Rein Kotov
- Edited by: Andres Hallik
- Music by: Aleksandra Vilcinska
- Production companies: Filmivabrik; Hansafilm [ee]; Kultfilma [lv]; Studio Uljana Kim
- Distributed by: Hea Film
- Release date: 13 February 2026
- Running time: 125 minutes
- Countries: Estonia; Latvia; Lithuania
- Language: Estonian
- Budget: €1,847,000

Our Erika (Estonian: Meie Erika) is a 2026 biographical sports drama film co-written and directed by German Golub in his feature debut. A co-production between Estonia, Latvia, and Lithuania, it stars Karolin Jürise as the Estonian track cycling racer Erika Salumäe. The film premiered at Tallinn on 13 February 2026 by Hea Film.

It was selected as the Estonian entry for the Best International Feature Film at the 99th Academy Awards.

== Synopsis ==
The film is an inspiring story of Estonian Olympic track bicycle racer Erika Salumäe, who overcomes a painful childhood, personal hardships, and the pressures of the declining Soviet regime to become an Olympic champion in 1988 Summer Olympics and in 1992 Summer Olympics winning two gold medals. Driven by an intense desire to succeed, and to be loved, Erika transforms from a troubled young woman into a national hero. Yet her greatest victory forces her to question whether fame and achievement can truly give her the love and acceptance she has always sought. In 1988, her moment of glory came at the Town Hall square, she was received as a national hero – "our Erika".

== Cast ==
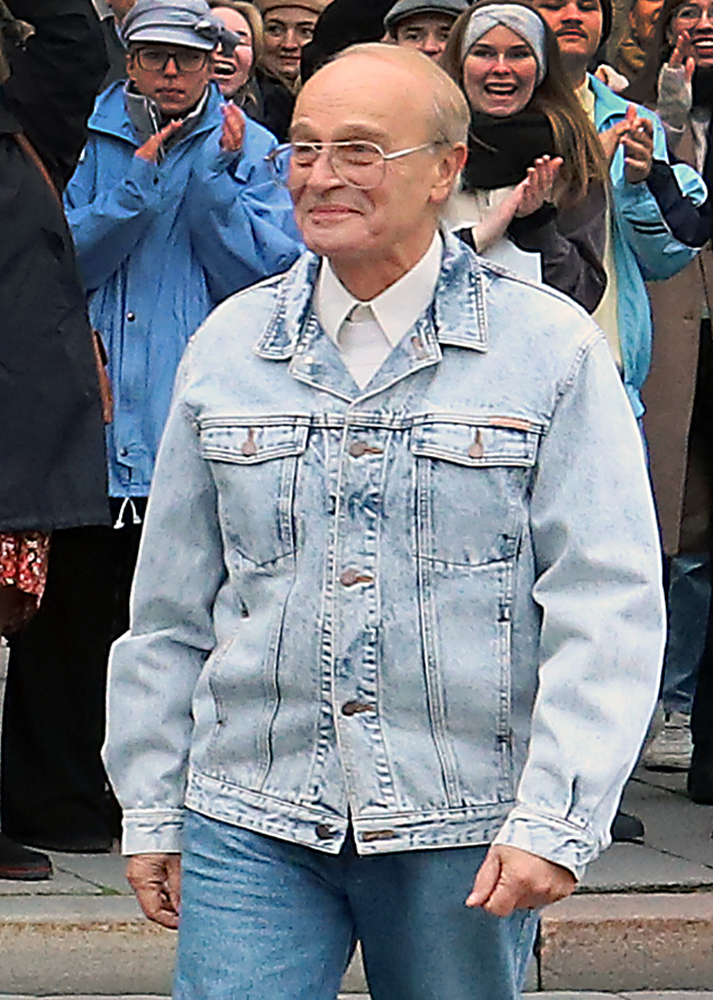
Viktor Lanberg, Russian actor living in Estonia 2024

- Karolin Jürise as Erika Salumäe
- Saara Kõiv as Erika, 10-year-old
- Magda Kõrvits as Erika, 5-year-old
- Erki Laur as Kalmus
- Milena Mishkevich as Jenjuhhina
- Kristin Prits as Annika
- Rodion Kuzmin as Sokolov
- Viktor Lanberg as Leonov
- Katariina Tamm as Ruth
- Ülle Kaljuste as Kasuvanaema
- Mari Abel as Ruth
- Simeoni Sundja as Väino
- Tiit Sukk as Tiit
- Pääru Oja as Jaanus Kuum
- Priit Loog as Ants Antson
- Juhan Ulfsak as Aksel
- Tiina Tauraite as Naismiilits
- Silva Pijon as Heli
- Ronja Marie Tepp as Irina
- Piret Laurimaa as Elva õpetaja
- Carmen Mikiver as Kaagvere direktor
- Rein Pakk as Väliseestlane
- Joonas Koff as Jõmm
- Marju Lepp as Jalgrattaliidu sekretär

== Production ==
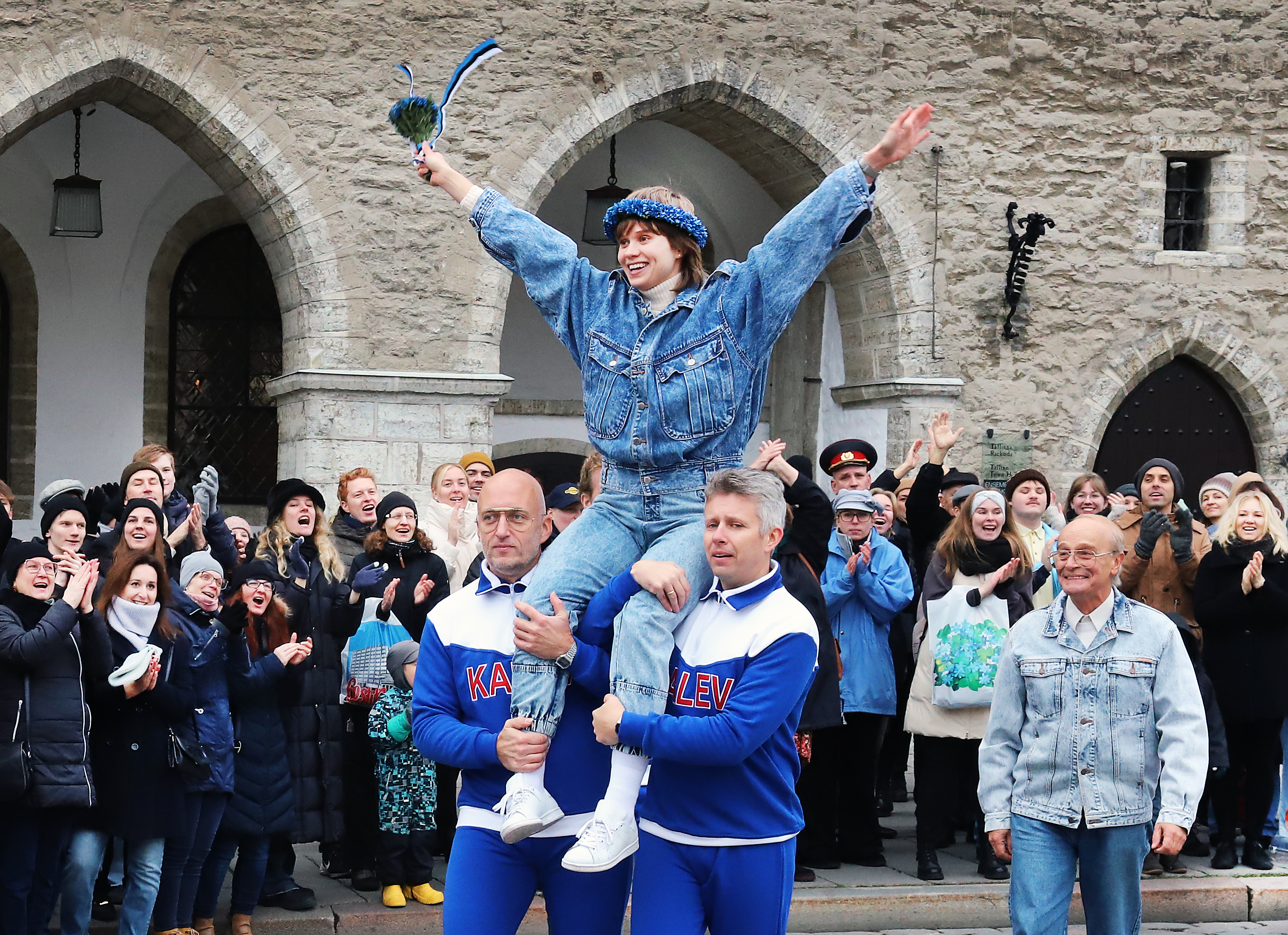
Karolin Jürise on the set of film in 2024

The film distributed by Hea Film is supported by the Estonian Film Institute, Cultural Capital, Latvian Film Fund, Lithuanian Film Centre, National Film Centre of Latvia, Tartu Film Fund, Estiko, Viru Film Fund and Elva Coop.

Principal photography began on 1 June 2024 at locations in Estonia, Lithuania, Latvia, Finland, Georgia, Munich and vicinity. Filming ended on 28 August 2024. The shooting of the film began in Estonia in locations in Tallinn, Tartu County and Ida-Viru County in June 2024, then in Latvia and Lithuania in July and back to Estonia in August 2024.

In Estonia in August, the film was shot at Pirita Velodrome in the Pirita district of Tallinn, Estonia. Actors on retro-style bicycles, wearing period sportswear at a banked circuit constructed during the Soviet era, filmed 1986 UCI Track Cycling World Championships scenes. In November 2024, last sequence of the film, the felicitation of Erika Salumäe at Tallinn Town Hall square in 1988 was filmed.

In November 2024, the film was presented in Baltic Event Works in Progress at the Industry@Tallinn & Baltic Event for festival premieres.

== Release ==
Our Erika was premiered on 13 February 2026 in Estonian cinemas.

The film will also be available on the Estonian platform Elisa in 2026.

== See also ==
- List of submissions to the 99th Academy Awards for Best International Feature Film
- List of Estonian submissions for the Academy Award for Best International Feature Film
