= I Was Here (film) =

2008 film

- Directed by: René Vilbre
- Written by: Sass Henno (novel); Ilmar Raag
- Release dates: July 8, 2008 (Karlovy Vary International Film Festival); September 12, 2008 (Estonia)
- Running time: 94 minutes
- Country: Estonia
- Language: Estonian

I Was Here (Estonian: Mina olin siin) is an Estonian feature film, based on a novel Estonian: Mina olin siin. Esimene arest by Sass Henno. The story is about a 17-year-old boy who becomes a drug dealer, the decision that draws him into turbulent events he can't control. The movie was directed by René Vilbre and written by Ilmar Raag. The film premiered on 8 July 2008 at the Karlovy Vary International Film Festival, in Estonia was released on 12 September 2008 and it became the 5th most successful Estonian film premiere since the early 1990s.

The movie was co-produced by Amrion Productions in Estonia, and Helsinki Filmi OY in Finland

== Cast ==
- Rasmus Kaljujärv - Rass
- Hele Kõre - Renita
- Margus Prangel - Mõssa
- Märt Avandi - Aivo
- Marilyn Jurman - Säde
- Johannes Naan - Janar
- Tambet Tuisk - Olari
- Doris Tislar - Hanna
- Triin Tenso - Kelly
- Nikolai Bentsler - Talis
- Rafael Jenokjan - Ruslan
- Jaan Rekkor - Karm tüüp
- Sten Zupping - Turske tüüp
- Anne Reemann - Teacher
- Marta Laan - Rass' deskmate
