= Mehis Pihla =

Estonian playwright and director

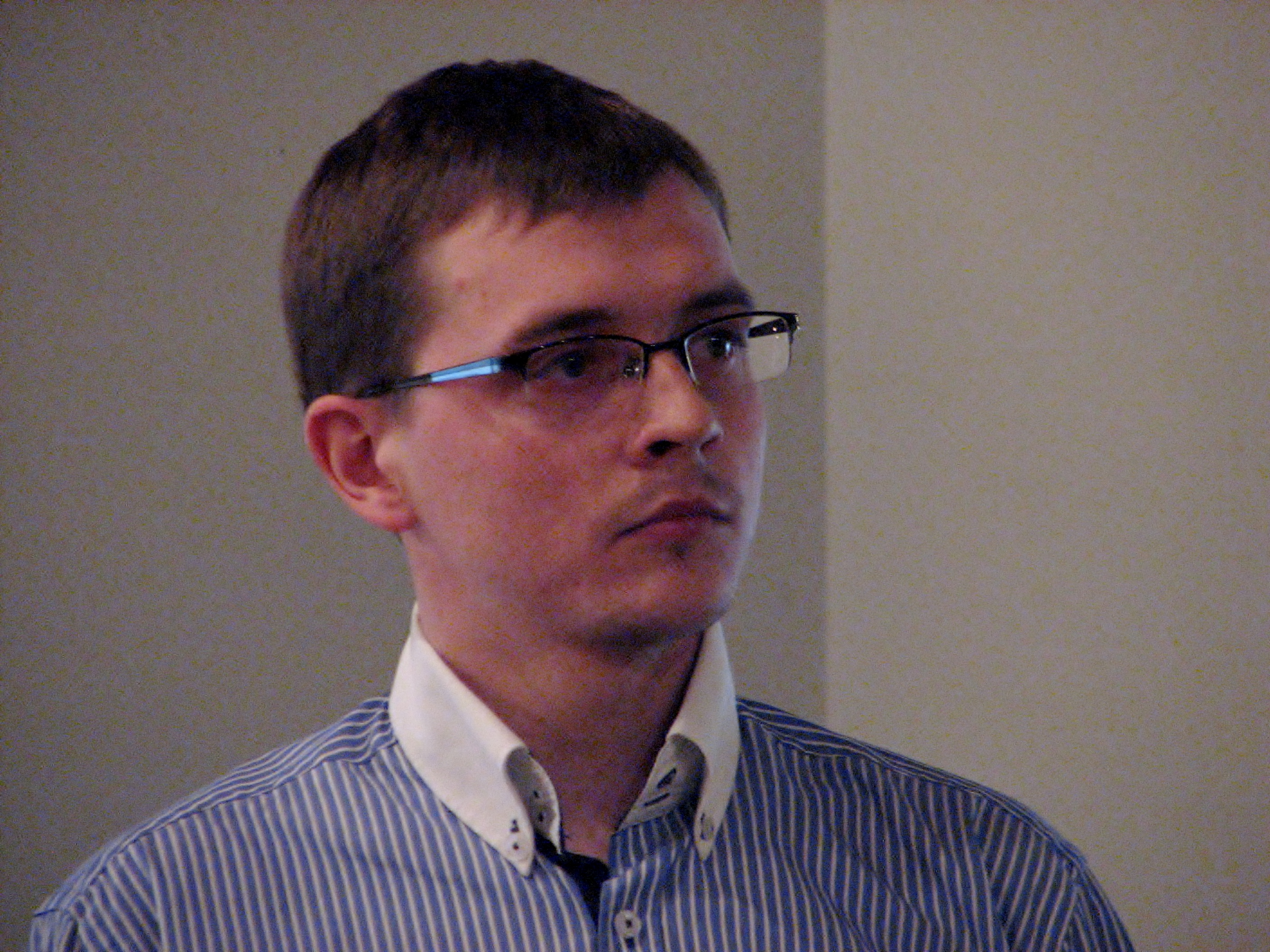
Mehis Pihla

Mehis Pihla (born 1988) is an Estonian playwright, screenwriter and director. He is best known for Rahamaa (Business as Usual), a play inspired by the Danske Bank money laundering scandal. At the 2025 Estonian Theatre Awards, Rahamaa won Best Play.

Since 2018, Pihla has been a dramaturg and director at the Estonian Drama Theatre.

== Biography ==
Mehis Pihla was born in Tallinn, Estonia. He graduated from Kose Gümnaasium in 2008. In 2011 he graduated from the University of Tartu with a degree in semiotics and cultural theory. From 2011 to 2012, he worked as a telecommunications and utility networks design engineer.

In 2016 Pihla graduated from the Theatre Department of the Estonian Academy of Music and Theatre with a degree in dramaturgy. From 2016 to 2018, he worked as a freelance dramaturg, playwright and director. Since 2016, he has been a member of the Estonian Theatre Union and the Estonian Directors’ and Dramaturgs’ Union. Since 2018, Pihla has worked in the Literary Department of the Estonian Drama Theatre as a dramaturg.

== Works ==
=== Theatre ===
==== Plays ====
- Ükskord Liibanonis (2025) - Once Upon a Time in Lebanon, translated by Adam Cullen (2025). The play premiered in February 2025 at the Estonian Drama Theatre, directed by Hendrik Toompere Jr Jr.
- Rahamaa (2024) - Business as Usual, translated by Adam Cullen (2024). The play premiered in June 2024 at the Estonian Drama Theatre, directed by Hendrik Toompere Jr Jr. The play has been translated into French (La Grande Lessive, translated by Martin Carayol, 2025); into Romanian (Afacerile sunt afaceri, translated by Raluca Rădulescu, 2025)
- Surm (2023, co-authors Birgit Landberg, Kaarel Targo, Kristian Lüüs, Laura Niils) - The Death premiered in December 2023 at Must Kast Theatre, directed by Birgit Landberg.
- Meister Solness (2022, co-author Siret Campbell) - The Master Solness premiered in October 2022 at the Estonian Drama Theatre, directed by Mehis Pihla. Adaptation of The Master Builder by Henrik Ibsen.
- Solist (2021) - The Soloist premiered in February 2022 at the Estonian Drama Theatre, directed by Kersti Heinloo.
- Kuldse liilia saladus (2019) - The Secret of the Golden Lily premiered in December 2019 at Rakvere Teater, directed by Kersti Heinloo.
- Evolutsiooni revolutsioon (2019, co-author Birgit Landberg and the ensemble) - The Revolution of the Evolution premiered in December 2019 at Must Kast Theatre, directed by Birgit Landberg.
- Bладь и Миръ (2019) - translated into Latvian (Bладь и Миръ, translated by Daila Ozola, 2025)
- Metsa forte (2018) - Forest Forte premiered in May 2018 at the Estonian Drama Theatre (co-production with Nargenfestival), directed by Hendrik Toompere Jr Jr.

==== Adaptations ====
- Aja oma atra läbi koolnute kontide (2024) - Drive Your Plow Over the Bones of the Dead premiered at the Estonian Drama Theatre, directed by Hendrik Toompere Jr, adapted from the Olga Tokarczuk novel of the same name.
- Lohe needus (2018) - The Curse of the Dragon premiered in November 2018 at the Estonian Drama Theatre, directed by Kersti Heinloo, adapted from the Helen Käit's children's book of the same name.

==== Productions ====
- Henrik Ibsen, Mehis Pihla, Siret Campbell Meister Solness (Master Solness; 2022) - premiered in October 2022 at the Estonian Drama Theatre
- Ingmar Bergman Stseenid ühest abielust (Scenes from a Marriage; 2021) - co-director Kristjan Suits, production by SKENE Katus Kunstile
- Mehis Pihla, Birgit Kermes, Kristjan Lüüs, Karl Kermes Olla või ohkida? (To Be, or to Sigh; 2020) - premiered in September 2020 at Vanemuine concert hall, production by Point Theatre
- Anat Gov Oh jumal (Oh God; 2020) - premiere February 29, 2020 at the Estonian Drama Theatre
- Lucas Hnath Nukumaja, osa 2 (A Doll's House, Part 2; 2019) - premiered in March 2019 at the Estonian Drama Theatre
- Annie Baker John (2018) - premiered in October 2018 at Tallinn City Theatre
- Henrik Ibsen Hedda Gabler (2017) - premiered in May 2017 at Vanemuine Theatre
- Mehis Pihla Tasujad (The Avengers; 2016) - premiered in November 2016 at Ugala Theatre
- Mehis Pihla and ensemble Ilus on noorelt... (2016) - premiered in April 2016 at Vanemuine Theatre
- Mehis Pihla and ensemble Uhkus ja eelarve (Pride and Budget; 2016) - premiered in January 2016 at Endla Theatre

=== Film ===
Pihla was one of the screenwriters of the Estonian TV series Alo (2018, 2021) and the film Kalev (2022, Allfilm). He is the screenwriter of Meie Erika (Our Erika, 2026), a film about the Estonian track bicycle racer and Olympic gold medalist Erika Salumäe (director: German Golub).

== Awards ==
- 2014 – Voldemar Panso Award
- 2019 – 3rd Prize for Bладь и Миръ, Estonian Theatre Agency Playwriting Competition
- 2021 – Estonian Drama Theatre Colleagues’ Award Kaval-Ants - for the readiness to write, direct, and step on stage at short notice
- 2022 – Estonian Drama Theatre Colleagues’ Award Kaval-Ants (with Kairi Kruus) - for directing Today we die hard, staged reading project
- 2024 – Estonian Drama Theatre Colleagues’ Award Kaval-Ants - for astonishing talent
- 2025 – Estonian Theatre Award for Best Play - for the play Rahamaa (Business as Usual)
