= Liisa Pulk =

Estonian actress

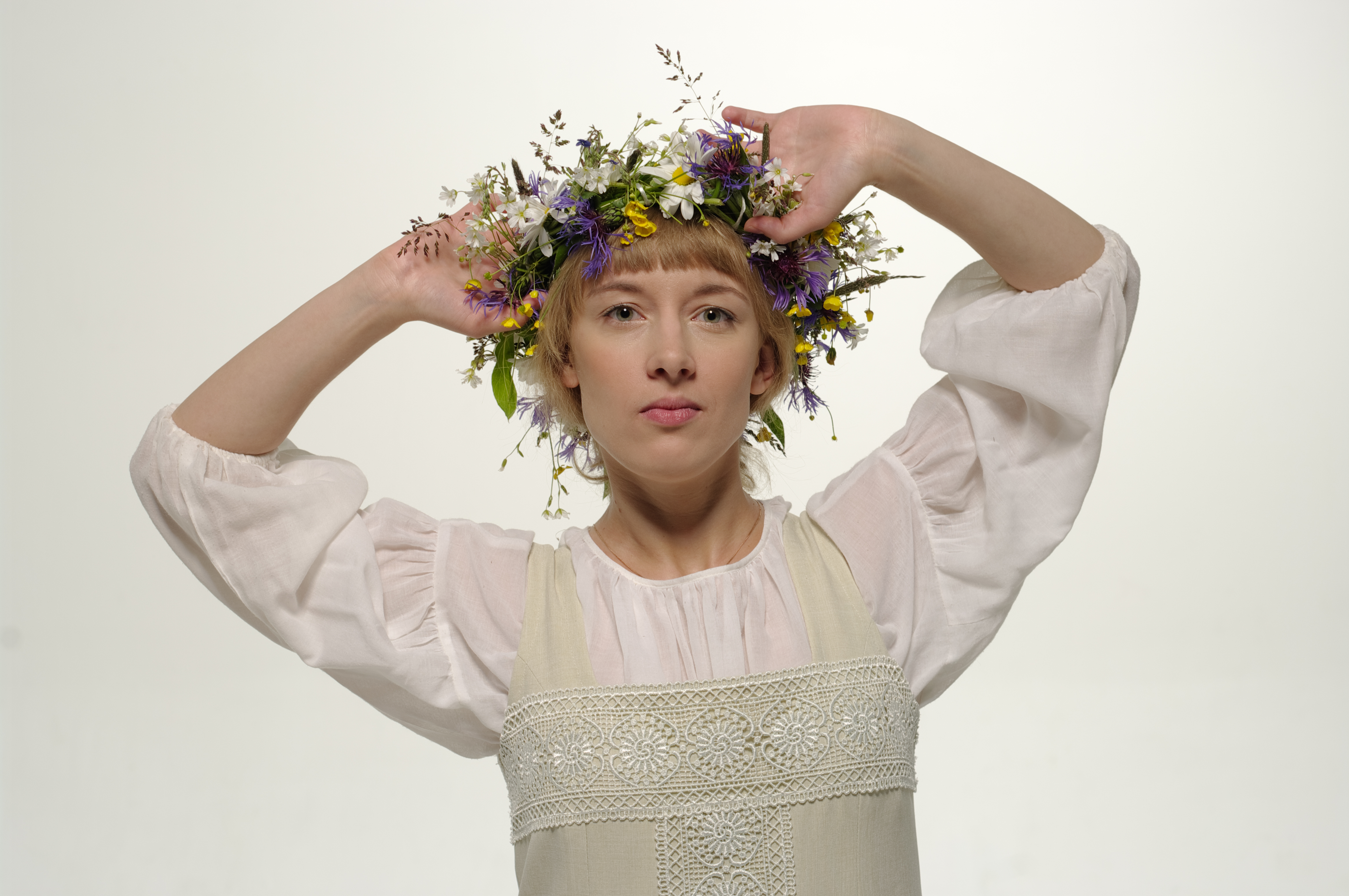
- Pulk in a 2013 publicity image for her role in a Vanemuine production of Ivan Goncharov's Oblomov.
- Born: 12 June 1985 (age 40); Pärnu, then part of Estonian SSR, Soviet Union
- Occupation: Actress
- Years active: 2010–present
- Children: 1

Liisa Pulk (born 12 June 1985) is an Estonian stage, television, voice, and film actress whose career began in 2010.

== Early life and education ==
Liisa Pulk was born in Pärnu, where she attended primary and secondary schools. She is a 2004 graduate of the Pärnu Sütevaka Humanitarian Gymnasium private school. Afterwards, she enrolled at the University of Tartu, studying semiotics and cultural studies, until 2006, when she enrolled in the Performing Arts Department of the Estonian Academy of Music and Theatre in Tallinn to study acting under actor and instructor Hendrik Toompere Jr. Among her graduating classmates were Mikk Jürjens, Liis Haab, Lauri Kaldoja, Sandra Üksküla-Uusberg, Marta Laan, Kristjan Üksküla, Roland Laos, and Hendrik Toompere Jr. Jr.

== Career ==
=== Stage ===
In 2010, Shortly after graduating from the Estonian Academy of Music and Theatre, Pulk began an engagement at the Vanemuine theatre in Tartu which lasted until she chose to depart and become a freelance actress in 2013. Among her more memorable roles at the Vanemuine were as Zara in Sofi Oksanen's Purge (2010), Liesl in Richard Rodgers' The Sound of Music (2010), Nurse Gunn, Waitress, and Reidun Nordsletten in Ingvar Ambjørnsen's Elling tetralogy (2011), Juta Laurits in Eduard Vilde's The Elusive Miracle (2011), Virginie in Yves Jamiaque's Monsieur Amilcar (2011), and Nancy Rimmington in Ray Cooney's Chase Me, Comrade! (2013).

Since her departure from the Vanemuine, Pulk has performed at theatres throughout Estonia, including the Theatre NO99, the Von Krahl Theatre, the VAT Teater, the MTÜ R.A.A.A.M., and the Estonian Drama Theatre in Tallinn, the Ugala theatre in Viljandi, and the Tartu New Theatre in Tartu. Notable roles have been in productions of works by such varied authors and playwrights as Nikolai Evreinov, Molière, Henrik Ibsen, Tim Firth, Harper Lee, Mati Unt, Mikhail Bulgakov, William Shakespeare, Andrus Kivirähk, Tom Stoppard, and August Kitzberg.

=== Television ===
Liisa Pulk made her television debut as an actress in a 2009 episode of the Kanal 2 drama series Saladused. She has since appeared in roles in a number of Estonian television series, including several roles in the long-running TV3 comedy-crime series Kättemaksukontor between 2010 and 2016. In 2012, she appeared on the Kanal 2 horror-mystery series Süvahavva. Other roles have included small roles or guest appearances in the Kanal 2 comedy series Takso in 2015, the Eesti Televisioon (ETV) drama series Mustad lesed in 2015, and the Kanal 2 crime series Viimane võmm, also in 2015. Pulk is perhaps possibly best known to television viewers for her role as Pille Kadak, a central character in the ETV comedy series ENSV, which reflects on the lives of a number of individuals in the Estonian Soviet Socialist Republic during the 1980s. Pulk's role as Pille Kadak began during the series' first broadcast in 2010 and she remained with the series until it ended in 2019.

=== Film ===
Pulk's first substantial film role was that of a teacher in the 2018 period drama Seltsimees laps, directed by Moonika Siimets. This was followed the same year by a small role as a doctor in the Maria Advjuško-directed mystery-drama Tuliliilia, starring Ingrid Isotamm and Johann Urb. In 2019, she had a starring role as Õie opposite actor Henrik Kalmet in the Rain Rannu-directed comedy Ükssarvik about a young couple who create a startup company in their garage.

In 2024, she appeared as Maili in the Rasmus Merivoo comedy film Tulnukas 2 ehk Valdise tagasitulek 17 osas, a feature-length sequel to the popular 2006 comedy short film Tulnukas ehk Valdise pääsemine 11 osas.

=== Voice ===
Since 2010, Pulk has also worked extensively as a voice actress in both Estonian and foreign animated films and videos. She has provided the Estonian language dubbing for the character of Astrid Hofferson in the 2010 American animated action fantasy film How to Train Your Dragon and the two subsequent sequels, How to Train Your Dragon 2 in 2014, and How to Train Your Dragon: The Hidden World in 2019. Other roles in foreign animated films that have been voiced by Pulk include:

- Rise of the Guardians (2013) – The Tooth Fairy
- Superbook (2013) – various
- Superbook 2 (2014) – various
- The Good Dinosaur (2015) – Ramsey
- Gnome Alone (2017) – Tiffany
- Finding Dory (2016) – various
- Ralph Breaks the Internet (2018) – Yesss
- Charming (2018) – various
- Racetime (2018) – various
- Wonder Park (2019) – Mother

== Personal life ==
Liisa Pulk is in a long-term relationship with entrepreneur Erki Kukk. On 23 June 2019 Pulk gave birth to her first child, a daughter named Mona. The family reside in Tallinn.
