= Piret Laurimaa =

Estonian actress (born 1971)

- Born: 3 November 1971 (age 54); Rapla, then part of Estonian SSR, Soviet Union
- Other name: Piret Palu
- Occupation: Actress
- Years active: 1996–present
- Spouse: Tiit Palu
- Children: 2

Piret Laurimaa (married name Piret Palu; born 3 November 1971), is an Estonian stage, television, radio, and film actress.

== Early life and education ==
Piret Laurimaa was born in Rapla to Tiit Laurimaa and Aave Uus (née Meriluht). She has three half-siblings. She graduated from secondary school in 1990, then studied acting at Aare Laanemets' theatre school in Pärnu. She graduated from Tallinn Pedagogical University (now, Tallinn University) in 1995.

== Stage career ==
Following graduation, she joined the Endla Theatre in Pärnu in 1996 and was engaged at the theatre until 2014. Among her more memorable international roles at the Endla were in productions of works by: Molière, Gustave Flaubert, Thornton Wilder, Tom Stoppard, Marc Camoletti, William Gibson, Maria Blom, Luigi Pirandello, Mikhail Lermontov, Leea Klemola, and Éric-Emmanuel Schmitt, among others. Roles in productions of Estonian playwrights and authors include works by: Karl Ristikivi, Juhan Smuul, A. H. Tammsaare, Friedebert Tuglas, August Gailit, and Illar Mõttus.

During her time at the Endla, Laurimaa was awarded the Estonian Theatre Award for Best Actress in 2008 and the Best Actress in 2009. She was voted the audience favorite in 2003, 2005, 2009, 2010, 2011, and 2014. She also received the Endla Colleague Award in 2002, 2005, 2007, and 2009.

In 2014, she left the Endla and joined the Vanemuine theatre in Tartu. Roles at the Vanemuine have been in productions of works by J. B. Priestley, Patrick Marber, E. B. White, and Lars Norén.

== Television and film career ==
Laurimaa made her feature film debut as the character Gerli in the 2003 Rando Pettai directed, Peep Pedmanson penned comedy Vanad ja kobedad saavad jalad alla (English release title: Made in Estonia). The film was based on the popular Estonian television comedy series Vanad ja kobedad. In 2013, she appeared as Kaarin in the Ilmar Raag directed romantic drama Kertu, released in English-speaking countries as Love Is Blind. She has also appeared in two film shorts: Perebisnes in 2003, and Haiguste ravi in 2011. In 2019, she appeared as Laura in the Gerda Kordemets directed comedy film Mehed.

She has made appearances on a number of Estonian television programs, including: Ohtlik lend in 2006, Kelgukoerad in 2008, Kättemaksukontor in 2009 and again in 2015, and Viimane võmm in 2015.

From 2009 until 2010, she appeared on the TV3 improvisational comedy series Vilde tee, adapted from the German television series Schillerstraße.

In 2026, she appeared in a small role as a teacher the in German Golub directed biographical sports drama Our Erika, which chronicled the career of Estonian track bicycle racer Erika Salumäe.

== Personal life ==
Piret Laurimaa married actor Tiit Palu in 1998. The couple have two children; a son and a daughter.
