= Hendrik Toompere Jr. Jr. =

Estonian actor

- Born: November 17, 1986 (age 39)

Hendrik Toompere Jr. Jr. (also known as Hendrik Toompere Jr; born 17 November 1986) is an Estonian director and actor. He is known for his productions at the Estonian Drama Theatre. Since 2018, he has been the artistic director of the Estonian Drama Theatre. His work as artistic director earned him in 2024 a special award at the Estonian Theatre Awards for developing a risk-taking, socially engaged, and diverse repertoire.

== Life and career ==
Toompere Jr Jr was born in Tallinn, Estonia. In 2006, he graduated from Tallinn Secondary School of Science. In 2010, he graduated from the Theatre Department of the Estonian Academy of Music and Theatre with a degree in acting. Since 2010, he has been a member of the ensemble at the Estonian Drama Theatre. Besides theatrical roles, he has also played in several films. Since 2010, he has been a member of the Estonian Theatre Union and the Estonian Actors’ Association, and since 2012, a member of the Estonian Directors and Dramaturgs Union.

His directorial debut was Rodolf Sirera's The Audition, staged under the title Marquis d’Artiste (2011). In 2013, he directed Davide Carnevali's Variations on the Kraepelin Model (Variazioni sul modello di Kraepelin).

His production of Marius Ivaškevičius’ Expulsion (Išvarymas) was a breakthrough, earning wide acclaim from both audiences and critics. For this production, he received the Best Director award at the 2017 Estonian Theatre Awards, and Nikolai Bentsler won Best Supporting Actor for his role in Expulsion.

Forest Forte (2018) marked his first collaboration with dramaturg Mehis Pihla. Their partnership continued as Toompere Jr Jr directed Pihla's plays Business as Usual (2024) and Once Upon a Time in Lebanon (2025).

Business as Usual (Rahamaa, 2024) is inspired by the money-laundering scandals that rocked Estonia's and Scandinavian banking sector. Told from the perspective of a young man from a modest background who lands a job at a Scandinavian bank's Tallinn branch—where many clients are oligarchs from Russia and beyond—the play explores how illicit finance has shaped Western politics for decades and why it is so difficult to abandon dirty money. The production won multiple honors at the 2025 Estonian Theatre Awards, including Best Play (Mehis Pihla), Best Actor (Tõnis Niinemets), Best Supporting Actor (Taavi Teplenkov), Best Original Music in a Drama Performance (Maria Faust), and Best Sound Design (Lauri Kaldoja). The production has been so popular that demand for tickets has caused a stir among audiences. The play depicts the Danske Bank money-laundering scandal that came to light after revelations by the Danish daily Berlingske in 2017–2018. It is said to tell a larger story—not only about the case itself, but about its impact on society—arguing that the effects in Estonia have been much deeper than in Denmark. While the scandal has amounted to a kind of national trauma in Estonia, in Denmark it has largely been treated as a legal and communications issue.

In 2025 Toompere jr directed another play by Lithuanian dramaturg Marius Ivaškevičius. Ivaškevičius' Totalitarian Romance examines state violence and cultural erasure through the Central Asian myth of the mankurt—a person stripped of memory to ensure obedience. Drawing on the author's conversations with a contemporary Tajik director whose production Mankurt was banned in 2022 (with one actor later imprisoned), the work juxtaposes memories of life in the USSR with the practices of present-day post-Soviet dictatorships. It explores the impact of Soviet and current authoritarian rule on Tajik language and culture, and interweaves this dialogue with the fate of Mikhail Bulgakov—including his late-life play praising Stalin—and with figures from The Master and Margarita to depict the tragedies of artists caught under political power.

In 2025 Toompere Jr Jr directed Mehis Pihla's play Once Upon a Time in Lebanon. Once Upon a Time in Lebanon is inspired by real events surrounding a hostage crisis involving Estonian citizens in Lebanon in 2011. The play is based on the television series script Trading Life (produced by Ove Musting, Mehis Pihla, and Siret Campbell) and Tiit Pruuli's book Antiliibanon 2011 (Anti-Lebanon 2011). The production has been highly popular with audiences, with all performances sold out. Although the story is familiar, Toompere Jr and his collaborators stage it with thriller-like tension, keeping the next twist persistently unpredictable.

== Personal life ==
Toompere Jr Jr is the son of actor and director Hendrik Toompere Jr (also known as Hendrik Toompere); his grandparents were actors Hendrik Toompere Sr and Maie Toompere (née Kruusenberg); his aunt is actress Harriet Toompere; and his great-grandfather was wrestler Herman Kruusenberg.

== Productions and roles in the Estonian Drama Theatre ==
Productions
Year	Author	Title (in Estonian)	Title (in English)	Notes
2011	Rodolf Sirera	Marquis d’Artiste	The Audition	
2013	Davide Carnevali	Kraepelini variatsioonid	Variations on Kraepelin's Model	
2016	Marius Ivaškevičius	Väljaheitmine ehk Ühe õuna kroonika	Expulsion, or The Chronicle Of An Apple	
2018	Mehis Pihla	Metsa forte	Forest Forte	co-production with Nargenfestival
2018	Ivan Vyrypaev	Päikesetriip	Line of the Sun	
2019	Lee Hall	Võrk	Network	
2020	Stefano Massini	Lehman Brothers	The Lehman Trilogy	
2022	Urmas Vadi	Tund enne päikesetõusu	An Hour Before Sunrise	
2022	devised by the ensemble	Café Théâtral	Café Théâtral	co-director and actor
2024	Mehis Pihla	Rahamaa	Business as Usual	
2024	Marius Ivaškevičius	Totalitaarne romaan	Totalitarian Romance	co-production with Vaba Lava
2025	Mehis Pihla	Ükskord Liibanonis	Once Upon a Time in Lebanon	

Roles
Year	Director	Author	Title (in Estonian)	Title (in English)	Role
2008	Hendrik Toompere Jr	Nikolai Jevreinov	Kõige tähtsam	The Most Important	Comedian
2010	Hendrik Toompere Jr	Anton Chekhov	Kirsiaed	The Cherry Orchard	Yasha
2010	Ingomar Vihmar	Mika Keränen	Varastatud oranž jalgratas	Stolen Orange Bicycle	Policeman Lippus
2011	Ingo Normet	Ernest Hemingway	Viies kolonn	The Fifth Column	1st soldier
2012	Hendrik Toompere Jr	Anton Chekhov	Kolm õde	Three Sisters	Nikolaj Lvovich Tuzenbach
2012	Mladen Kiselov	David Edgar	Nelipühad	Pentecost	
2012	Priit Pedajas	Halldór Laxness	Islandi kell	Iceland's Bell	Norwegian police chief; Jón Jónsson; vagabond
2012	Uku Uusberg	Andrus Kivirähk	Kevadine Luts	Spring Luts	Peeter Arusk
2014	Priit Pedajas	Madis Kõiv	Keskmängustrateegia	Middlegame Strategy	Young man
2015	Hendrik Toompere Jr	Fyodor Dostoevsky	Vennad Karamazovid	The Brothers Karamazov	Dmitri Karamazov
2015	Juhan Ulfsak	Michel Houellebecq	Kaart ja territoorium	The Map and the Territory	Jed Martin
2016	Georg Malvius	Lee Hall, Marc Norman, Tom Stoppard	Armunud Shakespeare	Shakespeare in Love	Boatman
2017	Hendrik Toompere Jr	Hendrik Toompere Jr	Üle piiri	Across the Border	Raul
2018	Kertu Moppel	Maxim Gorky	Väikekodanlased	The Philistines	Nil
2018	Hendrik Toompere Jr Jr	Mehis Pihla	Metsa forte	Forest Forte	participant
2021	Kertu Moppel	Klaus Mann	Mefisto	Mephisto	Otto Ulrichs
2022	Hendrik Toompere Jr Jr	Urmas Vadi	Tund enne päikesetõusu	An Hour Before Sunrise	Kaspar
2022	Hendrik Toompere Jr Jr, Karmo Nigula	devised by the ensemble	Café Théâtral	Café Théâtral	participant

== Selected filmography ==
Film
Year	Title (in Estonian)	Title (in English)	Role	Notes
2002	Pääsemine	Escape	Criminal in the car	
2008	Mehele parim	Best for the Man	Hendrik "Heins"	Student film
2011	Leipzigisse	Off to Leipzig	Karl	Student film
2012	Seenelkäik	Mushrooming	Villu Koobalt	
2013	Elavad pildid	Living Images	Erik, Paul, Mihhail / Mihkel	
2015	1944	1944	Kristjan Põder	
2016	Päevad, mis ajasid segadusse	The Days That Confused	Allar	EFTA (Estonian Film and Television Awards) for Best Actor
2017	Igitee	The Eternal Road	Toivonen's son	
2017	Keti lõpp	The End of Chain	Young man	
2021	Sandra saab tööd	Sandra Gets a Job	Kaarel	
2022	Erik Kivisüda	Erik Stoneheart	Dad	
