= Herman Kruusenberg =

Estonian wrestler (1898–1970)

- Born: 23 July 1898; Errinal, Kreis Wierland, Governorate of Estonia, Russian Empire
- Died: 5 June 1970 (aged 71); Ärina, Estonia

Herman Kruusenberg (23 July 1898 – 5 June 1970) was an Estonian Greco-Roman wrestler who competed in the light heavyweight event at the 1920 Summer Olympics.

Kruusenberg was born to farmer Joosep Kruusenberg and his wife Leena Marie Kruusenberg (née Tammeots), and worked on the family farm throughout his life. He never trained in a club and learned wrestling from Georg Lurich, who was born nearby and taught local boys when visiting his parents. Kruusenberg won the Estonian titles in 1921–1923 and placed third at the 1923 Baltic Championships.

Kruusenberg married Maria Kimmel and had two children. His daughter was actress Maie Toompere, who married actor Hendrik Toompere Sr. His grandchildren include actor Hendrik Toompere Jr. and actress Harriet Toompere, and his great-grandson is actor Hendrik Toompere Jr. Jr.
