= Mari Jürjens =

Estonian actress and singer

- Born: 27 May 1988 (age 38); Tartu, then part of Estonian SSR, Soviet Union
- Occupations: Actress, singer
- Spouse: Mikk Jürjens
- Website: mtias787.wixsite.com/mychroniclesmovie

Mari Jürjens, (née Pokinen, born 27 May 1988), is an Estonian actress and singer.

She graduated from the University of Tartu Viljandi Culture Academy in 2011 as a professional actress, and joined the Von Krahl Theatre in Tallinn.

In 2010, Jürjens debuted with the 11-track album 22 and released a second album, "Maa saab taevani", in 2013. Accordingly, the public recognises her as a singer rather than actress. Her best-recognised role so far has been an appearance in the Estonian crime series Kättemaksukontor.

== Life and music career ==
Mari Jürjens was born in Tartu in 1988. After Mari, her parents had two more daughters. She lived with her family in Põlva until age 6, when they moved to Ülenurme, closer to the city, where her parents still live.

She began studying at Ülenurme Gymnasium in 1995, graduating in 2004. Then she attended Tartu Mart Reiniku Gümnaasium, graduating in 2007. That year she started studying to become a professional actress at the University of Tartu Viljandi Culture Academy, graduating in the summer of 2011.

Jürjens has also received a musical education. In 2003 she attended Ülenurme Muusikakool, where she studied violin. She has sung in a number of choirs, spending the longest time with the Estonian Youth Mixed Choir. Jürjens also has participated in singing competitions; in 2004 she won second place in the Võruvisioon competition with the song Olematu sina. Since then, Jürjens has been writing more songs, starting with her 2010 debut album "22", and releasing a second album "Maa saab taevani" in 2013. Her song "Kord saan" include in the film Kertu released in 2013. In addition, she has participated in violin competitions.

She currently resides in Tallinn.

== Personal life ==
Mari Jürjens is married to actor Mikk Jürjens. She gave birth to twin boys in July 2014 and a son in 2017.

== Discography ==
=== Studio albums ===
Year	Title
2010	"22"
2011	"Meie küla laulud"
2013	"Maa saab taevani"
2016	"27"
2020	"Omaenese ilus ja veas"

== Filmography ==
Television
Year	Title	Role
2010	Kättemaksukontor	Aiki Hansen
2011	Nöbinina	Nõianeiu Nöbinina

Theatre
Production	Role	Showing
Jevgeni Švarts' "Dragon"	The little girl	Kuressaare Linnateater, 2008
Casamarciano krahv Annibale Sersale "Kiivad armastajad"	Fiametta	EMTA Lavakunstikool, 2009
William Shakespeare's "King Lear"	Regan	Von Krahl Theatre, 2010
Lars von Trier and Juhan Ulfsak's "Idioodid"	Mari	Von Krahl Theatre, 2010
Henrik Ibsen's "Hedda Gabler"	Thea Elvsted	Von Krahl Theatre, 2011
Kristian Smeds' "12 Karamazovit"	One of the Karamazovs	Von Krahl Theatre, 2011
F.G.Lorca's "Lillede keel", directed by Rainer Sarnet	Rosita	Von Krahl Theatre, 2012
Tallinna koolide 7. klasside õpilased "13", directed by Jim Ashilevi	Mari	Von Krahl Theatre, 2012
Kertu Moppel's "Sinihabe"	A character	Von Krahl Theatre, 2012
Mari Pokinen/Annika Viibus/Luise Sommer's "OmaOma"	Mari	Von Krahl Theatre, 2013
Karl Saks/Tanel Rander/Hendrik Kaljujärv's “Oh My God!”	Mari	Von Krahl Theatre, 2013
