= Ärina =

Village in Estonia

Coordinates: 59°09′N 26°14′E

- Village
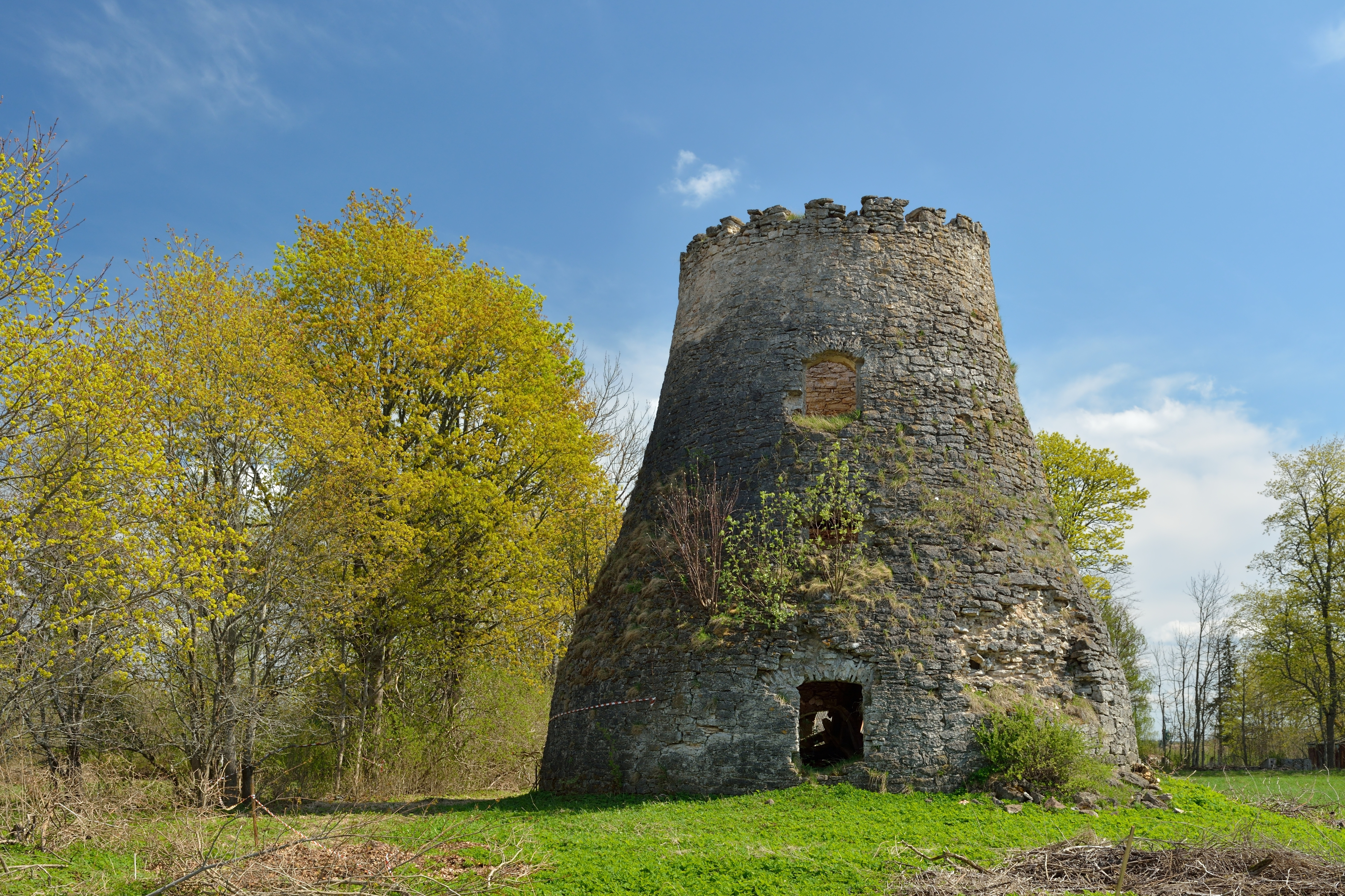
- Ärina windmill ruins
- Interactive map of Ärina
- Country: Estonia
- County: Lääne-Viru County
- Parish: Väike-Maarja Parish
- Time zone: UTC+2 (EET)
  - Summer (DST): UTC+3 (EEST)

Ärina (German: Errinal) is a village in Väike-Maarja Parish, Lääne-Viru County, in northeastern Estonia.

Ärina is the birthplace of Greco Roman wrestler Herman Kruusenberg (1898–1970).
