= Mladen Kiselov =

Mladen Kiselov (Bulgarian: Младен Киселов) (1943 – October 29, 2012) was a Bulgarian stage director and professor.

== Biography ==
Born in Ruse on June 11, 1943, Kiselov's mother was the director of the local opera. After studying directing in Russia, he worked in both theatre and film throughout Eastern Europe, eventually becoming resident director of the Ivan Vazov National Theatre and a faculty member of the Krastyo Sarafov National Academy for Theatre and Film Arts.

He moved to the United States to direct at the Yale School of Drama. He would go on to direct across the States and Canada and to join the Carnegie Mellon School of Drama faculty in 1992. After retiring in 2008, he continued to direct in the United States, as well as Europe, basing himself in Estonia.

He died at the age of 70 on October 29, 2012, in Sofia.
