= Sass Henno =

Estonian writer (born 1982)

Sass Henno (born September 13, 1982) is an Estonian writer.

Henno was born in Tartu and attended Miina Härma Secondary Grammar School between 1989 and 2001. Between 2001 and 2003 he studied computer graphics and advertising in Tartu Art College, then film and video directing in the Tallinn University between 2003 and 2005. Since 2007 he has been attending a master’s level screenwriting course in Baltic Film and Media School.

He won the first prize in Estonian Novel Competition 2005 with his work Mina olin siin. Esimene arest. A feature-length film based on the novel was released in 2008 (I Was Here).

Henno worked in Estonian Television as an assistant and director. Since 2005 he has been a member of Estonian Writers' Union. Since 2010 he works as a CEO of Spring Advertising ad agency Royal Service event marketing agency.

Henno also enjoys reading, sailing and shooting (IPSC).

== Bibliography ==
- Elu algab täna (Life Starts Today e-book, 2003)
- Mina olin siin. Esimene arest (I Was Here. The First Arrest; Eesti Päevaleht 2005)
- Mereröövlimäng (Pirat Game; Troll 2005)
- Elu algab täna (Life Starts Today; Eesti Päevaleht 2006)
- Südameasjad (Matters of the Heart; shortfilm, Allfilm 2007)

== Translations ==
I Was Here. The First Arrest

- Macedonian: Jас бев тука, Skopje: Antolog 2014
- Hungarian: Itt jártam: az első letartóztatás, Budapest: Silenos 2010
- Latvian: Šeit biju es. Pirmais arests, Riga: Dienas Grāmata 2006

Pirate Game

- Russian: Игра в пиратов, Tallinn: Kite 2012

== Awards ==
2004 Writers’ Union Novel Competition, winner (I Was Here. The First Arrest)
