= Urmas Vadi =

Estonian writer, journalist and theatre director

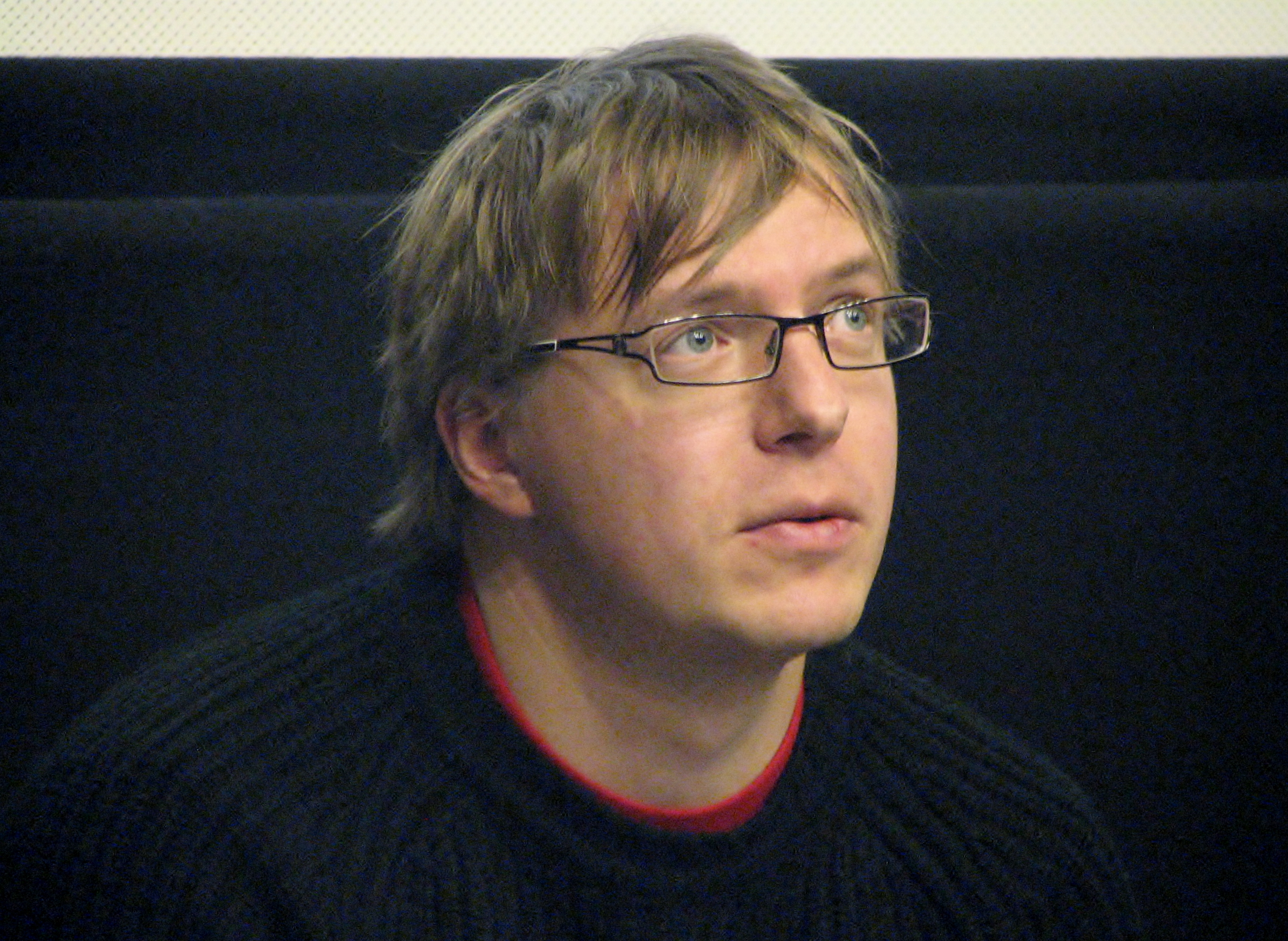
Urmas Vadi in 2012

Urmas Vadi (born 28 February 1977) is an Estonian writer, scenarist, radio editor and personality, journalist and theatre director.

In 2002 he graduated from Tallinn University in radio directing (Estonian: raadiorežii) speciality. Since 2001 he is working as a culture and literary editor at Estonian Radio.

Awards:

- 2010: Annual Drama Award of the Estonian Cultural Endowment
- 2011: Friedebert Tuglas short story award

== Works ==
- "Kui klosetist kerkib kloaak" (1996)
- "Suur sekund" (1999)
- "Lendav laev" (2000)
- "Unetute ralli" (2002)
- "Muna" (2002)
- "Kohtume trompetis! Elvis oli kapis!" (2005)
- "Kohtumine tundmatuga" (2008)
- "Revident" (2009)
- "Kirjad tädi Annele" (2010)
- "Tagasi Eestisse" (2012)
- "Kuidas me kõik reas niimoodi läheme" (2014)
- "Neverland" (2017)
- "Ballettmeister" (2019)
- "Elu mõttetusest" (2019)
- "Hing maanteeserval" (2021)
- "Kuu teine pool" (2023)
- "Armastuse hambajäljed" (2026)

== Career ==
Vadi was a member of the Tartu Young Authors' Association from 1997 to 2003 and joined the Estonian Writers' Union in 2004.

Alongside his literary work, he has worked extensively in radio. At Vikerraadio, he has been an author, editor and presenter of literature and culture programmes including Kultuurikaja, Litter, Kohustuslik kirjandus, Inemise sisu and Töövari.

Vadi has also worked as a playwright and theatre director. His directing debut came in 2004 with his play Kohtume trompetis! at VAT Teater.

== Awards ==
In addition to the Friedebert Tuglas Short Story Award, Vadi received the Tallinn University Literary Prize and was named Writer of the Year in 2013 for his novel Tagasi Eestisse.

His novel Ballettmeister received the Virumaa Literary Prize in 2020.

His 2023 novel Kuu teine pool received the Eduard Vilde Literary Award in 2024.
