= Hea Film =

Estonian film distributor

Estonian Theatrical Distribution OÜ
- Trade name: Hea Film
- Company type: Private
- Headquarters: Estonia
- Area served: Estonia
- Website: www.heafilm.ee

Hea Film (lit. 'Good Film'; legally Estonian Theatrical Distribution OÜ) is an Estonian film distributor. The company was established by three former staff of Forum Cinemas (a subsidiary of Finnkino). It took over all Baltic rights of The Walt Disney Company, 20th Century Studios, Universal and Paramount films.

== Activities outside Estonia ==
Hea Film operates a film distribution business in Latvia through Labs Kino (legally Latvian Theatrical Distribution SIA) and in Lithuania through Du Kine (legally Theatrical Film Distribution UAB).

== Distribution rights ==
Film studios	Estonia Hea Film	Latvia Labs Kino	Lithuania Du Kine
The Walt Disney Company	Yes	Yes	Yes
20th Century Studios distributed worldwide by The Walt Disney Company	Yes	Yes	Yes
Universal Pictures	Yes	Yes	Yes
Paramount Pictures	Yes	Yes	Yes
DreamWorks Animation distributed worldwide by Universal Pictures	Yes	Yes	Yes
