= René Vilbre =

Estonian film director

- Born: 17 May 1970 (age 56); Rakvere, then part of Estonian SSR, Soviet Union
- Occupation: Film director

René Vilbre (born 17 May 1970 in Rakvere) is an Estonian film director

René Vilbre has received the Children's Film Prize of the Nordic Film Institutes at the Lübeck Nordic Film Days in 2005 and the Don Quixote Award - Special Mention at the Molodist International Film Festival in 1998.

Vilbre's second feature film I Was Here was premiered at the Karlovy Vary International Film Festival on September 12, 2008 and in Estonia it became the 5th most successful Estonian film premiere since the 1990s.
