= Mika Keränen =

Finnish-Estonian writer (born 1973)

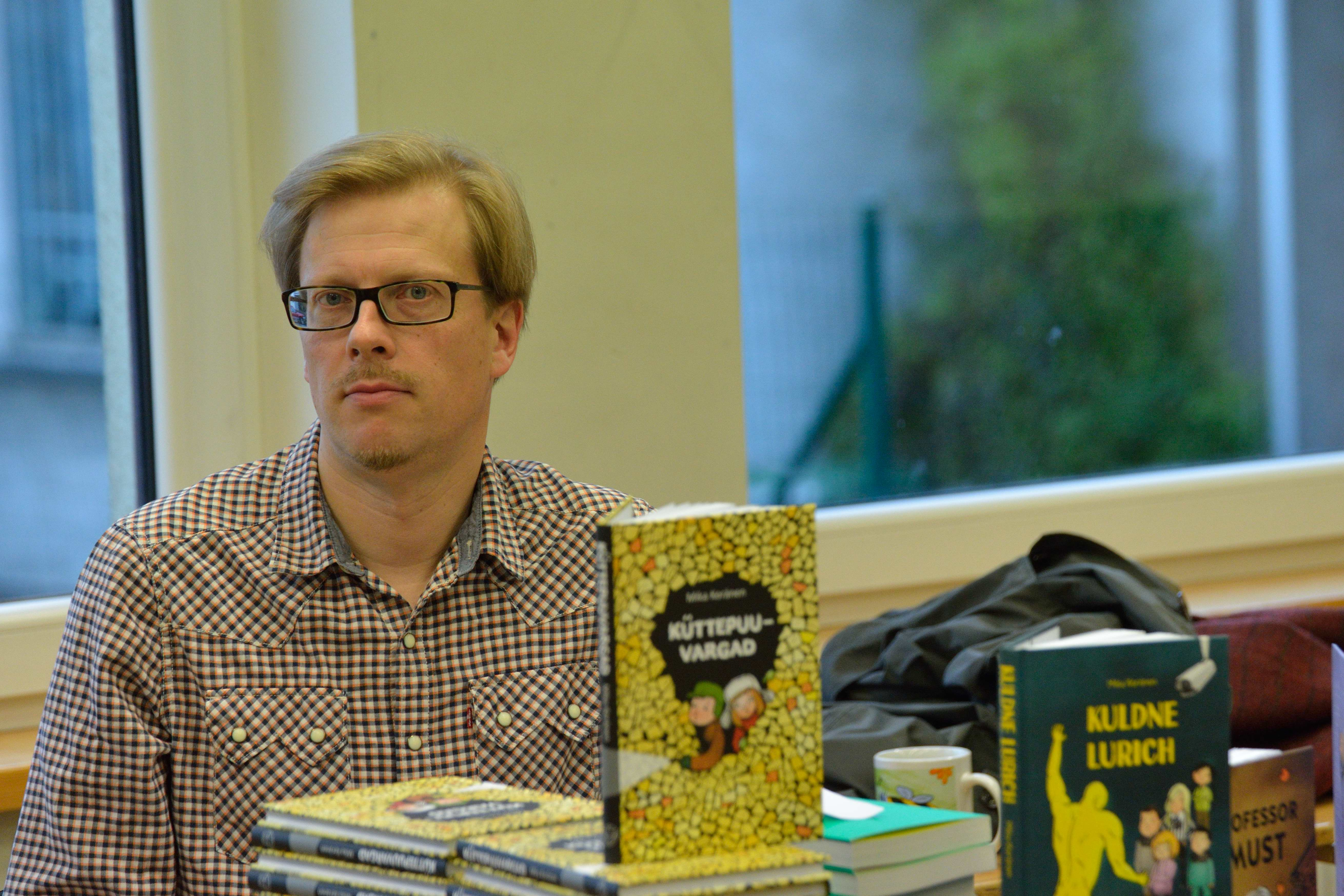
Mika Keränen in 2015

Mika Keränen (born 24 November 1973) is a Finnish-Estonian children's writer, poet and translator. He is best known for his series of Estonian-language crime stories, which are addressed to children. The settings of these stories take place in the Supilinn neighborhood of Tartu.

== Biography ==
Keränen was born in Helsinki. In 1999, he graduated from University of Tartu, studying the Estonian language as a foreign language. From 2002 to 2006, he was the director of the Estonian Institute in Finland. Since 2006, he returned to Estonia and is living and working in Tartu.

== Works ==
- 2008: children's story "Varastatud oranž jalgratas" ('The Stolen Orange Bicycle')
- 2009: children's story "Peidetud hõbedane aardelaegas" ('The Hidden Silver Treasure Box')
- 2017: children's story "Fantoomrattur" ('The Phantom Cyclist')

== Family ==
He has 3 kids, Emma, Eva and Nora.
