= Kivirähk =

Family name

Origin
- Language: Estonian
- Meaning: stone scree
- Region of origin: Estonia

Kivirähk is an Estonian surname meaning "stone scree"; a compound of kivi (stone) and rähk (scree, sharp-edged fragments of stone).

People bearing the surname Kivirähk include:

- Alfred Kivirähk (1903–1942), Estonian museum director and educator
- Andrus Kivirähk (born 1970), Estonian writer, playwright, screenwriter, and satirist
- Ingrid Kivirähk (1931–2024), Estonian actress and puppeteer
- Juhan Kivirähk (born 1957), Estonian sociologist
- Kaarin Kivirähk (born 1993), Estonian cultural theorist, art critic, curator and journalist
