= Estonian science fiction =

Science fiction and fantasy in Estonia is largely a product of the current post-Soviet era. Nonetheless, somewhat earlier authors, such as Eiv Eloon and Tiit Tarlap, do exist.

Eesti Ulmeühing is an organization for print science fiction in Estonia that awards annual Stalker prizes. The awards are named after the Andrei Tarkovsky film Stalker that was largely shot in Estonia.

In film the works of Raul Tammet have been analyzed.

In the 1980s notable were two novels by Eiv Eloon (real name Lea Soo; born 1945): "Kaksikliik" ('Double Species'; 1981) and "Kaksikliik 2" ('Double Species 2'; 1988). These two novels were only works by Eloon.

== A selection of Estonian writers who have won multiple Stalkers ==
- Veiko Belials
- Lew R. Berg
- Meelis Friedenthal
- Indrek Hargla - Pen-name for Indrek Sootak, he also writes detective fiction that has been translated to English.
- Leo Kunnas
- Tiit Tarlap
- Siim Veskimees

The novel The Man Who Spoke Snakish by Andrus Kivirähk was awarded the Stalker award in 2008.
