= Nikolay Veduta =

Soviet and Belarusian cybernetic economist

Nikolay Ivanovich Veduta
- Николай Иванович Ведута
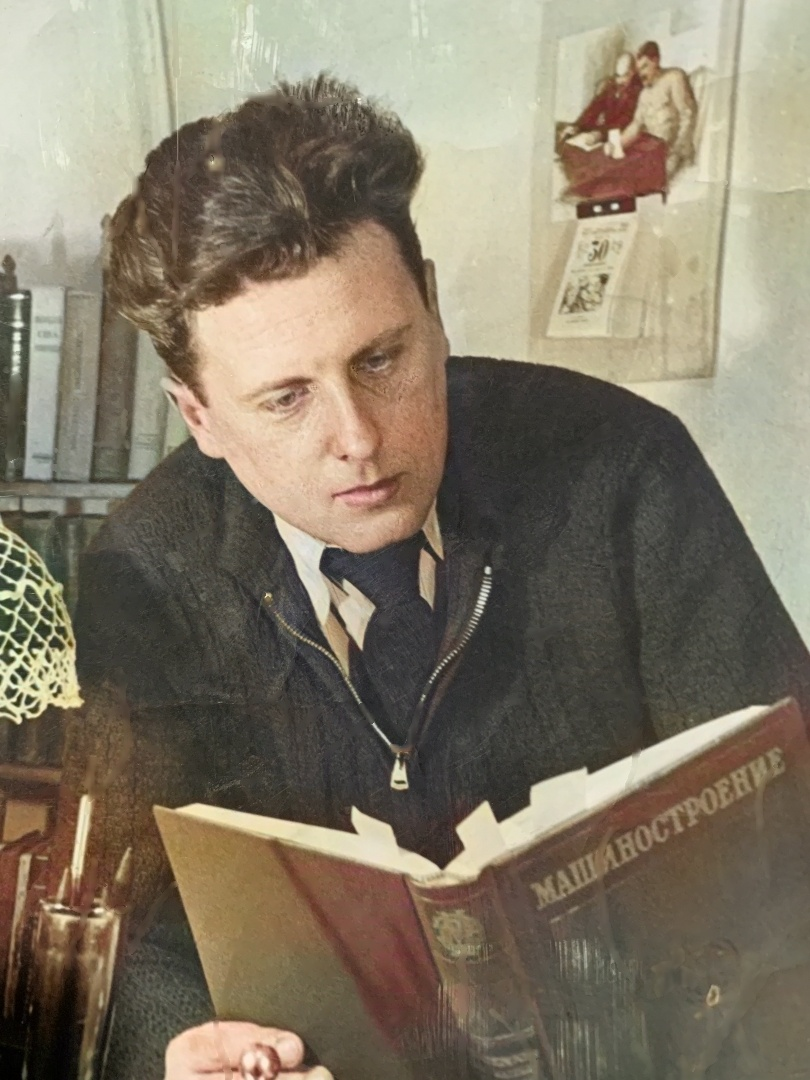
- Born: 6 February 1913; Starobelsk, Kharkov Governorate, Russian Empire
- Died: 25 April 1998 (aged 85); Minsk, Minsk Region, Belarus
- Known for: Dynamic model of input-output balance

Academic background
- Education: Kharkiv Polytechnic Institute
- Doctoral advisor: Alexander Ilyich Notkin

Academic work
- Discipline: Economics, Economic cybernetics, Strategic planning, Macroeconomics

Nikolay Ivanovich Veduta (Russian: Никола́й Ива́нович Веду́та, IPA: [vʲɪˈdutə]; 6 February 1913 – 25 April 1998) was a Soviet Belarusian cybernetic economist, macroeconomist, mechanical engineer and Marxist, Doctor of Economic Sciences (1966), Full Professor (1968), Corresponding Member of the NASB (1969). He is the founder of the Scientific School of Strategic Planning. Author of over 100 scientific papers, including 5 monographs.

In 1998, the publishing house IBC (Cambridge) included the biography of Nikolay Veduta in the book “2000 outstanding intellectuals of the 20th century”. Currently, active interest in the dynamic model of Strategic Planning developed by him is observed in China, Germany and other countries.

== Early life and education ==
Born on 6 February 1913 in the city of Starobelsk, Kharkov Governorate, into the family of a Don Cossack – doctor Ivan Veduta and noblewoman Lyubov Barbe. In 1938, he graduated from the Kharkiv Polytechnic Institute (1933‒1938). He started his career as a master of a machine tractor station (MTS).

== Career ==
=== During the war ===
At the beginning of the Great Patriotic War, he was sent to Stalingrad to rebuild the Stalingrad Tractor Plant named after Felix Dzerzhinsky for the production of tanks. After Stalingrad, he was sent to Chelyabinsk to rebuild the Chelyabinsk Tractor Plant named after Joseph Stalin for the production of tanks, and in 1943 – to Barnaul to build a new Tractor Plant.

=== After the war ===
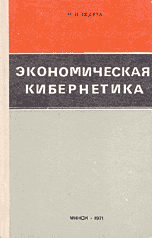
Nikolay Veduta, (1971) “Economic cybernetics”.

Nikolay Veduta returned to Kharkiv and became the Chief Designer of the Kharkiv Tractor Plant named after Sergo Ordzhonikidze. In 1952, he entered graduate school at the Institute of Economics of the Academy of Sciences of the Soviet Union.

In 1957‒1962, he was Deputy Director and head of the Sector of the Institute of Economics of the Academy of Sciences of the Belarusian SSR. In 1962‒1967, he was the Director of the Central Research Institute of Technical Management and member of the Board of the Ministry of Instrumentation, Automation and Control Systems of the Soviet Union. He led the implementation of the country's first ICS at machine-building enterprises.

In 1967, Nikolay Veduta was the first head of the Department of Economic and Mathematical Methods and Programming at the Belarusian State Institute of National Economy named after Valerian Kuybyshev. In 1967‒1977, he was the head of the Sector of the Institute of Economics of the Academy of Sciences of the Belarusian SSR and at the same time the head of the Department of the Belarusian State Institute of National Economy.

In 1977‒1989, he was a senior researcher, head of the Sector of the Research Institute of Electronic Computing Machines. In 1978‒1982, he was a professor at the Republican Intersectoral Institute for Advanced Training of Managers and Industry Specialists. He worked as the ChEng of the Minsk Tractor Plant, and then as the head of the long-term planning department in the State Planning Committee of Belarusian SSR.

== Awards and honors ==
- The Order of the Badge of Honour (1966).
- The Medal “For Valiant Labour in the Great Patriotic War 1941‒1945”.
- The Medal “Veteran of Labour”.
- The Jubilee Medal “In Commemoration of the 100th Anniversary of the Birth of Vladimir Ilyich Lenin”.
- The Jubilee Medal “Thirty Years of Victory in the Great Patriotic War 1941‒1945”.
- The Jubilee Medal “Forty Years of Victory in the Great Patriotic War 1941‒1945”.
- The Jubilee Medal “50 Years of Victory in the Great Patriotic War 1941‒1945”.
