= Victor Golla =

American linguist (1939–2021)

- Born: 1939; Santa Rosa, California, U.S.
- Died: 2021 (aged 81–82); Trinidad, California, U.S.
- Occupation: Linguist
- Spouse: Ellen Golla

Academic background
- Education: University of California, Berkeley

Academic work
- Main interests: Indigenous languages of California and Oregon
- Notable works: California Indian Languages (2011)

A map of the Yokuts language, developed by Victor Golla and Kenneth W. Whistler

Victor Golla (1939–2021) was a linguist who specialized in the indigenous languages of California and Oregon, especially the Pacific Coast Athabaskan subgroup of the Athabaskan language family and the languages of the region that belong to the Penutian phylum. He was emeritus professor of anthropology at Humboldt State University and lived in Trinidad, California.

== Life and work ==
Golla was born in Santa Rosa, California, and grew up in the small town of Mt. Shasta, in the far north of the state, where his father was a funeral director and deputy coroner of Siskiyou County. The family moved to the San Francisco Bay area in 1952, and Golla attended high school in Oakland. He graduated from UC Berkeley in 1960 and received his Ph.D. in linguistics from the same institution in 1970.

Golla taught briefly at the University of Alberta (assistant professor of linguistics, 1966–1967) and Columbia University (instructor in anthropology, 1967–1968), and then settled in Washington, D.C. for two decades, teaching in the anthropology department at George Washington University (1968–1988) and conducting research on the extensive archival documentation of American Indian languages that is housed in the National Anthropological Archives at the Smithsonian Institution. In 1988, he was invited to join the faculty of Humboldt State University, in Arcata, California, as professor of Native American Studies and director of the Center for Indian Community Development.

In 1981 Golla helped found the Society for the Study of the Indigenous Languages of the Americas (SSILA), and subsequently served for 25 years as the Society's secretary-treasurer and editor of its quarterly SSILA Newsletter (1982 to 2007). SSILA established the Victor Golla Prize in his honor, to recognize Americanist linguists who show "a significant history of both linguistic scholarship and service to the scholarly community".

In addition to his work at Humboldt, Golla held a series of visiting appointments at UC Davis (professor of anthropology 1996–1997; research associate in anthropology, 1997–2006), and from 2001 co-principal investigator of the J. P. Harrington Database Project. He also served as a linguistic consultant to the Hoopa Valley Tribe, where he was responsible for creating the Hupa Practical Alphabet and a number of pedagogical and reference materials, including an English-Hupa bilingual dictionary (1996a).

He was the author of several scholarly books and numerous articles on American Indian languages, including three grammars of Hupa (1970, 1986a, 1996b) and a 1000-page compendium of the Hupa lexical and grammatical materials collected in 1927 by Edward Sapir (Sapir & Golla 2001). His last major publication, California Indian Languages (2011), was awarded the 2013 Leonard Bloomfield Book Award by the Linguistic Society of America for being the recently published book "which makes the most outstanding contribution to the development of our understanding of language and linguistics".

In 2015 Golla was named a Fellow of the American Association for the Advancement of Science (AAAS). In selecting Golla, the society cited his "influential research on Native American linguistics and ethnography" and his "outstanding service to the profession."

Golla died at his home in Trinidad, California, in April 2021 of advanced Parkinson's disease and a stroke.

== Major publications ==
- Golla, Victor (1970). Hupa Grammar. Doctoral dissertation, University of California, Berkeley.
- Golla, Victor (1976). Tututni (Oregon Athapaskan). International Journal of American Linguistics 42:217-227.
- Golla, Victor & Shirley Silver, editors (1978). Northern California Texts. IJAL-Native American Texts Series 2(2). Chicago: University of Chicago Press.
- Krauss, Michael E. & Victor Golla (1981). Athabaskan Languages of the Subarctic. In Handbook of North American Indians, volume 6:Subarctic (June Helm, editor), pp. 67–85. Washington: Smithsonian Institution.
- Golla, Victor (1984). The Sapir-Kroeber Correspondence. Letters Between Edward Sapir and A. L. Kroeber, 1905-1925. Survey of California and Other Indian Languages, Report 6. Berkeley: Department of Linguistics, University of California.
- Golla, Victor (1986a). A Short Practical Grammar of Hupa. Hoopa: Hupa Language Project, Hoopa Valley Tribe.
- Whistler, Kenneth W. & Victor Golla (1986b). Proto-Yokuts Reconsidered. International Journal of American Linguistics 52: 317–358
- Golla, Victor (1987). Sapir, Kroeber, and North American Linguistic Classification. In New Perspectives on Edward Sapir in Language, Culture and Personality (W. Cowan et al., editors), pp. 17–38. Amsterdam and Philadelphia: John Benjamins.
- Golla, Victor, editor (1994). John P. Harrington and His Legacy. Special Issue, Anthropological Linguistics (volume 33.4, March 1984).
- Golla, Victor (1996a). Hupa Language Dictionary, Second Edition. Arcata: Center for Indian Community Development, Humboldt State University and Hoopa Valley Tribe.
- Golla, Victor (1996b). Sketch of Hupa, an Athapaskan Language. Handbook of North American Indians, volume 17, Languages (Ives Goddard, editor), pp. 364–389. Washington: Smithsonian Institution.
- DeLancey, Scott & Victor Golla (1997). Penutian: Retrospect and Prospect. International Journal of American Linguistics 63:171-201
- Sapir, Edward & Victor Golla (2001). Hupa Texts, with Notes and Lexicon. In: The Collected Works of Edward Sapir, volume 14, Northwest California Linguistics (Victor Golla & Sean O’Neill, editors), pp. 19–1011. Berlin & New York: Mouton de Gruyter.
- Golla, Victor (2003). Ishi's Language. In: Ishi in Three Centuries (Karl Kroeber & Clifton Kroeber, editors), pp. 208–225. Lincoln: University of Nebraska Press.
- Golla, Victor & Juliette Blevins (2005). A New Mission Indian Manuscript from the San Francisco Bay Area. Boletíin, California Mission Studies Association 22:33-61.
- Golla, Victor (2007a). North America. In: Encyclopedia of the World’s Endangered Languages (Christopher Moseley, editor), pp. 1–96. London & New York: Routledge.
- Golla, Victor (2007b). Linguistic Prehistory. In: California Prehistory. Colonization, Culture and Complexity (Terry L. Jones & Kathryn A. Klar, editors), pp. 71–82. Lanham (Maryland): Altamira Press.
- Golla, Victor, with Lyle Campbell, Ives Goddard & Marianne Mithun (2008). North America. In: Atlas of the World’s Languages, second revised edition (R.E. Asher & Christopher Moseley, editors). London & New York: Routledge.
- Golla, Victor (2011). California Indian Languages Berkeley, Los Angeles and London: University of California Press.
