= Christopher Moseley =

British linguist and translator (1950–2026)

- Born: 1950
- Died: 2026 (aged 75–76)
- Education: School of Slavonic and East European Studies, University of London
- Occupations: Linguist, translator

Christopher Moseley (1950–2026) was a British linguist of Australian origin, a specialist in Finno-Ugric and Baltic-Finnic languages, and a translator.

Born in Australia, he moved to the United Kingdom in 1974, where he studied Scandinavian languages at the School of Slavonic and East European Studies at the University of London. His research interests included newly written languages and geolinguistics. Moseley translated literary works from Estonian, Latvian, and Finnish. His translations into English include A. H. Tammsaare's Põrgupõhja uus Vanapagan (The Misadventures of the New Satan), Andrus Kivirähk's Mees, kes teadis ussisõnu (The Man Who Spoke Snakish), the Melchior Wakenstede (Apothecary Melchior) series by Indrek Hargla, Ilmar Taska's Pobeda 1946 (A Car Called Victory), and Rein Raud's Päikesekiri (The Sun Script).

From 2007, he worked as an Estonian language teacher. Moseley was a founding member of the Foundation for Endangered Languages.

Moseley died in October 2026.

== Works ==
- Moseley, Christopher (2008). Colloquial Estonian. Routledge. ISBN 0415450543.
- Moseley, Christopher; Prauliņš, Dace (2015). Colloquial Latvian: The Complete Course for Beginners (Colloquial Series). Routledge. ISBN 9781317306184.
- Christopher Moseley (2008). Encyclopedia of the World's Endangered Languages. Routledge. ISBN 1-1357-9640-8.
- Moseley, Christopher (2011). "Language Learning Targeted for Social Integration: The Cases of Estonia and Latvia". In Fenoulhet, Jane (ed.). Mobility and Localisation in Language Learning: A View from Languages of the Wider World. Intercultural Studies and Foreign Language Learning. New York: Peter Lang Publishing. ISBN 9783034301503.
