= Juhan Kivirähk =

Estonian sociologist

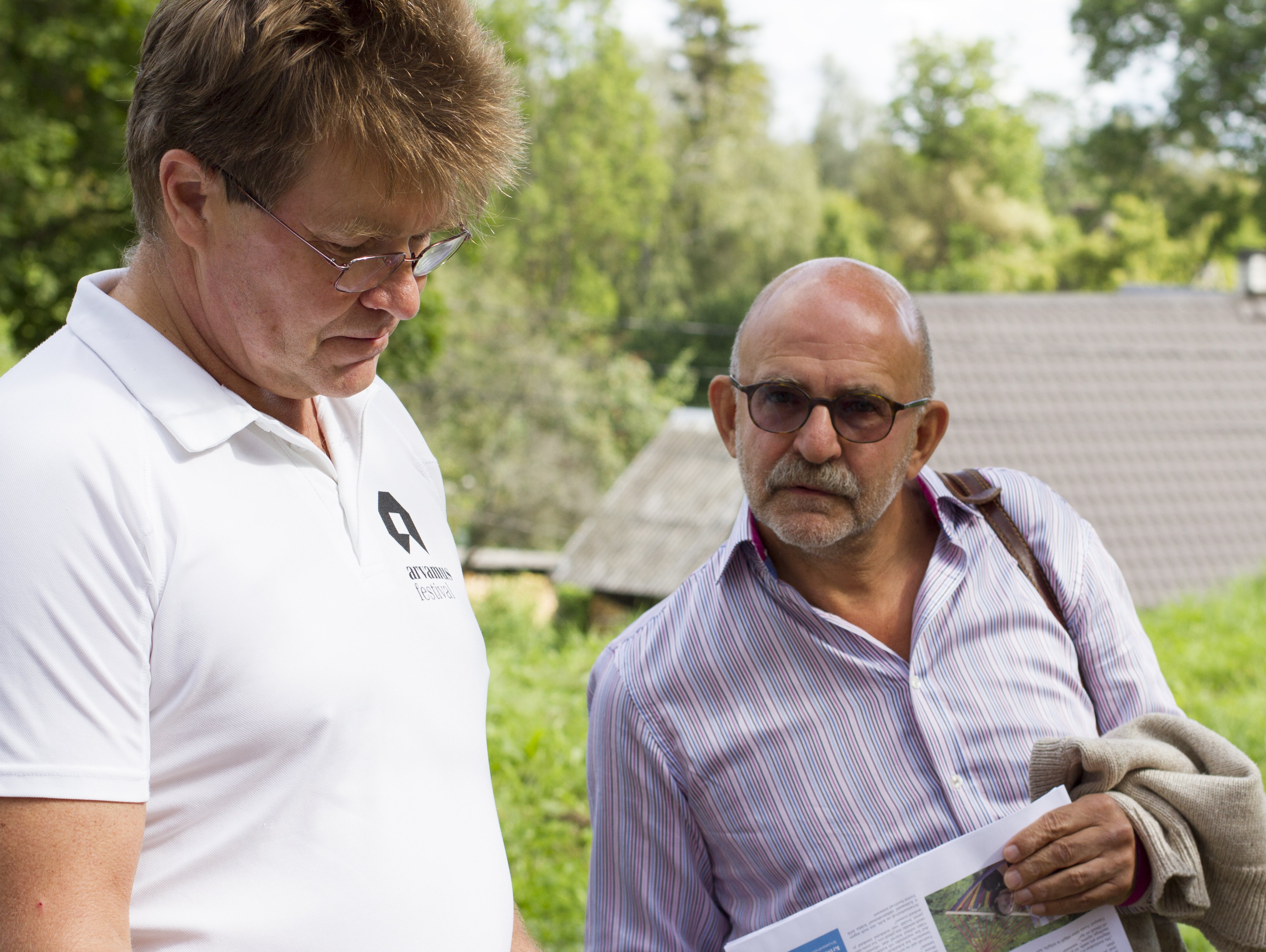
- Kivirähk (left) with David Vseviov in 2014
- Born: 2 July 1957 (age 69); Tallinn, Estonian SSR
- Parent(s): Ants Kivirähk (father); Ingrid Kivirähk (mother)
- Relatives: Andrus Kivirähk (brother); Kaarin Kivirähk (niece)
- Awards: Order of the White Star, V class (2001)

Academic background
- Education: University of Tartu

Academic work
- Discipline: Sociology
- Main interests: Economic cybernetics, public opinion polling

Juhan Kivirähk (born 2 July 1957 in Tallinn) is an Estonian sociologist.

== Early life and education ==
Kivirähk is the son of actor and theatre director Ants Kivirähk and actress Ingrid Kivirähk. He is the older brother of writer Andrus Kivirähk. In 1980, he graduated from Tartu State University with a degree in economic cybernetics. He continued his studies at the Institute of Socioeconomic Problems within the Estonian Academy of Sciences from 1984 to 1988.

== Career ==
He is one of the founders of two Estonian poll companies: AS Emor (established in 1990) and OÜ Uuringukeskus Faktum (established in 2002). 1998-2002 he was the vice-director of the poll company Turu-uuringute AS. He has also worked on International Centre for Defence and Security (ICDS).

== Awards ==
- 2001: Order of the White Star, V class.
