= Foundation for Endangered Languages =

Organization supporting the protection of endangered languages

The Foundation for Endangered Languages is a non-profit organization, registered as Charity 1070616 in England and Wales, founded in 1996. Its founding members included the translator Christopher Moseley. Its current chairman is Nicholas Ostler.

It exists to support, enable, and assist the documentation, protection, and promotion of endangered languages.

The foundation awards small grants (of the order of US$1,000) for all kinds of projects that fall within this remit. It also publishes a newsletter, OGMIOS: Newsletter of Foundation for Endangered Languages, and hosts an annual conference, with proceedings that are available as published volumes.
