= Empires of the Word =

2005 non-fiction book by Nicholas Ostler

Empires of the Word: A Language History of the World
- Author: Nicholas Ostler
- Language: English
- Genre: History, nonfiction
- Published: 2005
- Publisher: HarperCollins
- Publication place: United Kingdom
- Pages: 640
- ISBN: 9780062047359

Empires of the Word: A Language History of the World is a 2005 historical non-fiction book, by Nicholas Ostler. The 640-page book seeks to provide new insights into the spread and decline of large languages, especially exploring certain lingua francas around the world.

== Contents ==
The book charts the history of spoken language, in its myriad forms, across the world.

The book also explores the various lingua francas that have since seen decline.

== Reception ==
Publishers Weekly called it "ambitious and accessible", and "stimulating".

The Independent noted that the book's "chief pleasure [...] lies in its detail, and in its hieroglyphs, ideograms and scripts plus translations."

Kirkus Reviews found it to be "dense but enlightening" and "always challenging, always instructive—at times, even startling or revolutionary", but expressed concern that its "sometimes turgid text" and sheer scope could "overwhelm general readers", and thereby prevent it from receiving the attention it deserves.
