= A Shade Colder =

Estonian magazine of contemporary art

- Editor: Kaarin Kivirähk (Editor-in-Chief); Keiu Krikmann (Managing Editor)
- Categories: Contemporary art, Visual culture
- Frequency: Bi-annual (print), quarterly (digital)
- Publisher: Estonian Centre for Contemporary Art (CCA)
- Language: English
- Website: www.ashadecolder.com

A Shade Colder is a contemporary art magazine and digital platform based in Tallinn, Estonia. Published by the Estonian Centre for Contemporary Art (CCA), it focuses on shared stories about visual culture in Central and Eastern Europe. The publication is internationally-focused and primarily written in English.

== Background ==
The magazine was established in 2022 as a source of modern Estonian art journalism. It was funded initially through a competition with the Ministry of Culture for a new art magazine as the winning idea.

The Editor-in-Chief is Kaarin Kivirähk and the Managing Editor is Keiu Krikmann. The editorial board consists of Marika Agu, Maria Arusoo, and Sten Ojavee. Graphic design and layout of the magazine is done by Johanna Ruukholm and Martina Gofman of the studio Jojo&me.

=== Design ===
The magazine has been noted for its "unique" layout and design. It is typeset with the fonts Aktsidents, Adieu, and Quadrant Slab. The logo is typeset in Slack.

=== Content ===
Each issue of A Shade Colder is curated around a specific conceptual theme, such as "Practices in Dialogue" or "Uncertain Territories." The magazine frequently features interviews with artists and essays on feminist art history and the impact of digital media on society.

It features artist interviews, analytical essays, fiction and reviews from Estonia and the broader Baltic and Nordic regions. The publication's ongoing contributions to the local art landscape have been regularly featured. It is primarily geared towards art professionals. Contributions are generally from those working within the art community in Estonia.

The magazine is an English-language platform for Estonian artists, curators and writers to reach a global audience. It typically releases one or two themed print issues per year. Digital copies are freely accessible online. There is a digital version published four to five times a year and a print version that is published two times a year. The paper version can be found in bookstores in Estonia.

The magazine also publishes the Majickk Sound podcast. It is a contemporary art podcast hosted by curator Marika Agu. It is produced by the Estonian Centre for Contemporary Art (CCA) and is an extension of the magazine. The series features interviews with artists and composers. Each episode typically focuses on one artist, discussing their technical methodology and the philosophy behind their work.

The series has featured figures in the Northern European sound art scene, such as John Grzinich, an American-Estonian artist and associate professor at the Estonian Academy of Arts to discuss acoustic ecology, field recording and Grzinich's work with environmental sounds in locations like the mining regions of Ida-Virumaa. Agu also interviewed Dodomundo, a Vilnius-based DJ and artist. The conversation explores the physical and psychological effects of sound in club environments and the role of art galleries as social spaces.

=== Selected publications ===
Issue Theme	Publication Date	Citation
Practices in Dialogue	October 2025	
Uncertain Territories	April 2025	
The Many Faces of You	April 2024	
The Shapes of Language	November 2023	
Flesh in Tension	July 2023	
Shifting Timelines	April 2023	

== Media coverage ==
=== Fair pay ===
In the early 2020s, the Estonian contemporary art scene mobilized regarding fair remuneration for artists and freelance cultural workers. A tiered framework was introduced, linking recommended fee rates to estimated workloads using the national minimum wage and the cultural worker's minimum wage as baseline metrics. A Shade Colder committed that remuneration for contributors would adhere fully to the recommended fair pay model.

== See also ==
- Culture of Estonia
- Estonian Academy of Arts
- Estonian art
