= The Man Who Spoke Snakish =

2007 novel by Andrus Kivirähk

- Author: Andrus Kivirähk
- Original title: Mees, kes teadis ussisõnu
- Illustrator: Andres Rõhu
- Language: Estonian
- Published: 2007 (Eesti Keele Sihtasutus)
- Publication place: Estonia
- Media type: Print, Audio
- Pages: 381
- ISBN: 978-9985-79-178-3

The Man Who Spoke Snakish (Estonian: Mees, kes teadis ussisõnu) is a novel by Estonian author Andrus Kivirähk, first published in 2007. It is set in an imaginary Estonia during the Middle Ages. The novel was awarded the Stalker award of Estonian science fiction in 2008.

== Summary and key themes ==
The protagonist is Leemet, an Estonian who is part of a diminishing group of forest-dwellers, upholding ancient traditions and speaking the ancient "snake-tongue" which lets them control animals and speak with snakes. In the assessment of Alfie Howard and Diane Nelson,

The novel is set in a fantastical reimagining of thirteenth-century Estonia during the Northern Crusades, when the land is being invaded and settled by Germanic Christians. Kivirähk's novel tells the story of Leemet, one of the last Estonians to continue living a hunter-gatherer lifestyle in the forest, which the rest of his people are gradually abandoning in favour of village life, agriculture and Christianity. Leemet is also one of the last people — by the end of the novel, the very last person — to speak Snakish, an ancient language that was taught to humans by snakes many generations ago and that gives speakers the power to control most animals. Leemet's people have lived in close relation to the non-human world for millennia, practicing their traditional spirituality in sacred forest groves, hunting animals for meat, telling myths and stories and embarking on complex relationships with members of non-human animal species, especially snakes, wolves and bears. The novel employs magical realism alongside elements of folklore, including from the Estonian epic Kalevipoeg [...], the Finnish Kalevala [...] and Estonian folk tales such as "The Northern Frog" [...] and "The Tale of the Man Who Knew Snake-Words" [...]. The shamanic culture of Leemet's Estonians bears similarities to traditional Finno-Ugric culture, for example, worship in sacred groves (practiced to this day by the Mari people of the Russian Volga). In Snakish, the way of life of the "old times" and the Snakish language are both rapidly disappearing as hunter-gatherers leave the forest to settle in villages.

== Audiobooks, translations, and adaptations ==
In 2008 an audiobook was published, read by the Estonian actor Tiit Sukk.

The novel was translated into English (2015) by Christopher Moseley, and it has also been translated into Czech (2011), Latvian (2011), French (as L'Homme qui savait la langue des serpents, 2013), Russian (2014), Danish (2015), Dutch (2015), Hungarian (2015), Spanish (2017), German (2017), Macedonian (2019), Lithuanian (2020) and Polish (2020).

In 2009 a board game with the same name was released by the game developer Revaler in cooperation with the newspaper Eesti Päevaleht.

The French translation was awarded the Grand Prix de l'Imaginaire for the best foreign-language novel in 2014.
