= Ilona Martson =

Estonian journalist, editor and translator

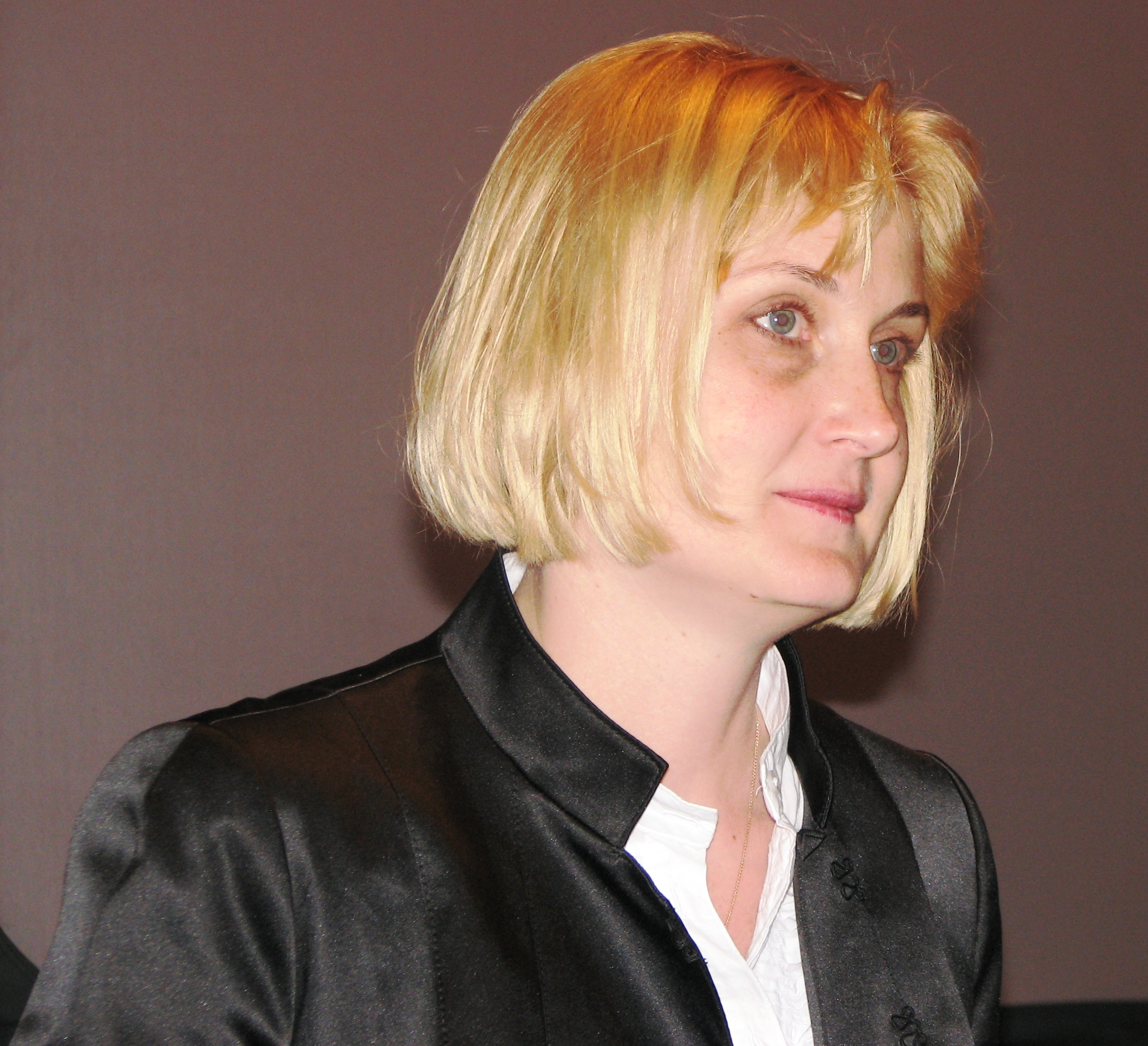
- Martson at the Baltic Book Fair in 2010
- Born: 1970 (age 55–56)
- Other name: Ilona Kivirähk
- Citizenship: Estonia
- Education: University of Tartu
- Occupations: Journalist; editor; translator
- Known for: Editor-in-chief of Täheke
- Spouse: Andrus Kivirähk
- Children: 3, including Kaarin Kivirähk
- Awards: Muhvi Award (2003); Paabeli Torni Award (2011); Tallinn University Literary Award (2020); Order of the White Star, IV Class (2021)

Ilona Martson (legal name Ilona Kivirähk; born 1970) is an Estonian journalist, editor and literary translator. Since 2004 she has been editor-in-chief of the children's magazine Täheke. She previously worked in the culture department of Eesti Päevaleht, later heading it, and has translated fiction into Estonian chiefly from Russian and Ukrainian. Her work in children's literature and translation has received the Muhvi Award, the Paabeli Torni Award, the Tallinn University Literary Award, and the Order of the White Star, IV Class.

== Early life and education ==
Martson studied journalism at the University of Tartu.

Alongside her editorial work, Martson has translated literature for children and adults, mainly from Russian and, increasingly, from Ukrainian.

While still a student, she began working in journalism; she later worked as a reporter, edited the literary supplement Arkaadia, and became head of the culture desk at Eesti Päevaleht.

== Career ==
In early 2004, Martson became editor-in-chief of Täheke. Under her editorship, the magazine has remained a prominent institution in Estonian children's culture. In 2020, ERR described Täheke as the longest-running children's magazine published in Estonian, and in 2024 Martson discussed the difficulties of reaching children through print in a digital media environment. Under her editorship, the magazine has remained an institution in Estonian children's culture. In 2022, Täheke published a Ukrainian-language special issue intended for free distribution to Ukrainian children who had fled the war to Estonia.

Alongside her editorial work, Martson has translated literature for children and adults, mainly from Russian and, increasingly, from Ukrainian.[2][4] Among the best-known translations associated with her are Grigory Oster's Õuduste kool, which received the Paabeli Torni Award in 2011, and Varlam Shalamov's Kolõma jutud, which received the Tallinn University Literary Award in 2020.

Martson has also taken part in the study and promotion of Estonian children's literature. She has been involved with the children's literature research group coordinated by the Estonian Children's Literature Centre, contributed the chapter on children's and youth periodicals to the survey volume Eesti laste- ja noortekirjandus 1991–2012, and was among the essayists in Eesti lastekirjanduse kuldvara.

== Selected translations and publications ==
- Eesti laste- ja noortekirjandus 1991–2012 (contributor; chapter Laste- ja noorteajakirjandus, 2014)
- Üks koll läks ükskord kooli: Eesti lapse kõige uuemad jubejutud (compiler, 2018)
- Larõssa Denõssenko, Maia ja sõbrad (translator, 2022)
- Varlam Shalamov, Kolõma jutud (translator, 2019)
- Romana Romanõšõn and Andri Lessiv, Sõda, mis muutis Rondot (translator, 2022)

== Honours and awards ==
- Muhvi Award (2003).
- Tallinn University Literary Award, translation category (2020), for her translation of Varlam Shalamov's Kolõma jutud.
- Order of the White Star, IV Class (2021)
- Paabeli Torni Award (2011), for her Estonian translation of Grigory Oster's Õuduste kool

== Personal life ==
Martson is married to author Andrus Kivirähk. They have three daughters: Kaarin, Liisa, and Teele. Their first grandchild was born in March 2024. In April 2024, her eldest daughter, Kaarin Kivirähk, gave birth to a son, Martson's first grandchild.

== See also ==
- Media related to Ilona Martson at Wikimedia Commons
- Quotations related to Ilona Martson at Wikiquote
