= Nicholas Ostler =

British scholar and author (born 1952)

Nicholas Ostler (/ˈoʊstlər/ (Note: This is different from the pronunciation of the common noun ostler /ˈɒslə/.); born 20 May 1952, Tunbridge Wells) is a British scholar, linguist, and author.

== Biography and work ==
Ostler studied at Balliol College, Oxford, where he received degrees in Greek, Latin, philosophy, and economics. He later studied under Noam Chomsky at the Massachusetts Institute of Technology, where he earned his PhD in linguistics and Sanskrit.

His 2005 book Empires of the Word: A Language History of the World documents the spread of language throughout recorded human history. The book documents and explains the spread of the various Semitic languages of Mesopotamia, including Akkadian and Aramaic, examines the resilience of Chinese through the centuries, and looks into the differential expansion of Latin in both halves of the Roman Empire, along with the many other expansions of the world's (historical) languages.

His 2007 book Ad Infinitum: A Biography of Latin looks specifically at the language of the Romans, both before and after the existence of their Empire. The story focuses on the rise, spread, and dominance of Latin, both among other languages of the Italian peninsula in the early part of the 1st millennium BC and among the languages of Western Europe in the Dark Ages and beyond, presenting the life of Latin as any biographer would present the life of his subject. With this book, Ostler provides a strong argument against the label 'dead language' so often assigned to Latin. However, the title, 'Ad Infinitum,' refers not to this, but to his thesis that the Latin-speaking world was unconscious of its own limits, looking always back to its centre, rather than outwards.

He is currently the chairman of the Foundation for Endangered Languages, and lives in Hungerford, England.

In 2013, he wrote the foreword for Navlipi, the publication of a universal script that deals with phonemic idiosyncrasies inherent in all the world's languages.

== Works ==
- Empires of the Word: A Language History of the World. HarperCollins: London and New York, 2005. ISBN 0066210860
- Ad Infinitum: A Biography of Latin. HarperCollins in the UK, and Walker & Co. in the USA: London and New York, 2007. ISBN 9780802715159
- The Last Lingua Franca: English until the Return to Babel. Penguin in the UK, and Bloomsbury/Walker Books in the USA. London and New York, 2010. ISBN 0802717713
- Passwords to Paradise: How Languages Have Re-invented World Religions. Bloomsbury. London and New York, 2016. ISBN 978-1-62040-515-4

== Sources ==
- Author: Nicholas Ostler, HarperCollins. Retrieved 21 January 2007.
- Ostler, Nicholas. Empires of the Word: A Language History of the World. New York: Harper Perennial, 2005. ISBN 0-06-093572-3
- Author: Nicholas Ostler, AP Watt (literary agent). Retrieved 26 July 2010.
