= Ingrid Kivirähk =

Estonian puppeteer and actor (1931–2024)

- Born: Ingrid Kasesalu; 18 May 1931; Tallinn, Estonia
- Died: 21 February 2024 (aged 92); Tallinn, Estonia
- Resting place: Metsakalmistu
- Occupations: Puppeteer, actress
- Years active: 1952–1993
- Spouse: Ants Kivirähk (m. 1953; died 1986)
- Children: Tiina Vapper, Juhan Kivirähk, Andrus Kivirähk
- Relatives: Kaarin Kivirähk (granddaughter)

Ingrid Kivirähk (née Kasesalu until 1953; 18 May 1931 – 21 February 2024) was an Estonian puppeteer and actor. She had a career spanning several decades. She was known for her work at Estonian Television (ETV), where she became a household name through her contributions to children's programming. She was a voice actress for many animated films dubbed into Estonian, participated in Estonian Radio radio dramas, and contributed a memorable vocal part to the sound recording of Arne Oit's hit song "Seenekorjamise laul" ("The Mushroom Picking Song", 1964).

== Early life and education ==
Ingrid Kivirähk was born Ingrid Kasesalu in Tallinn. Her father was a driver and her mother was a homemaker. She studied at Tallinn Secondary School No. 7 (now, Tallinn English College) from 1945 to 1947 and at the Drama Theatre Training Studio from 1951 to 1952, and graduated from the Viljandi School of Cultural Education in 1967 with a degree in club work.

== Career ==
She joined the Estonian Theatre Union in 1953. She was an actress at the Puppet Theatre from 1952 to 1955 and 1959 to 1962. Between 1965 and 1982, she was an assistant sound engineer at Estonian Television (ETV) and worked as a record library staff member from 1982 to 1992. She primarily performed as a puppet actress in several popular ETV children's series. She portrayed Tipp for 16 years (1965–1981) in the television series Tipp ja Täpp, by Uno Leies.

== Roles ==
Year	Role	Production
1952	Egli	White Friend (Sudarushkin)
1952	Orphan	The Orphan's Hand Mill (Kangilaski)
1953	Ajlo	Kingdom of Crooked Mirrors (Gubarev and Uspensky)
1953	Snow White	Snow White (Kelder)
1954	Little Red Riding Hood	Little Red Riding Hood (Toona)
1954	Daryusha	Silverhoof the Goat (Yermakov)
1959	Mei	The Ugly Girl (Jakob)
1959	Ostrich	The Insatiable Elephant's Child (Kipling and Vladytsina)
1960	Mei	Happy Mei (Jakob)
1960	Little Kid	The Wolf and the Seven Young Goats (Kompanyets)
1960	Scribe	The Devil's Watermill (Drda and Štok)
1962	Milli	Bunnies' School (Mantchev)
1962	Little Red Riding Hood and Bunny	Buratino Flies to the Moon (Leies)
1962	Miki	Bitter Enemies (Leies)
1992	Tiiu	Christmas Spirits (Kallak) at the Puppet Theatre
1993	Orphan	Twelve Months (Marshak) at the Puppet Theatre

=== Roles in Estonian Television children's series ===
Years	Role	Series
1965–1981	Tipp	Tipp ja Täpp
1967–1980	Telepoiss	Telepoiss
1981–1983	Tibu and Puppy	Kikerikii
1988–1990	Chestnut Girl	The Adventures of Tammetõru

== Personal life ==
She was married to Ants Kivirähk. She was the mother of Tiina Vapper, Juhan Kivirähk, and Andrus Kivirähk.

Ingrid Kivirähk is buried at Metsakalmistu in Tallinn, within the "Teatritegelaste kvartal" (Theatre Figures Quarter).
