= Regina Lukk-Toompere =

Estonian illustrator

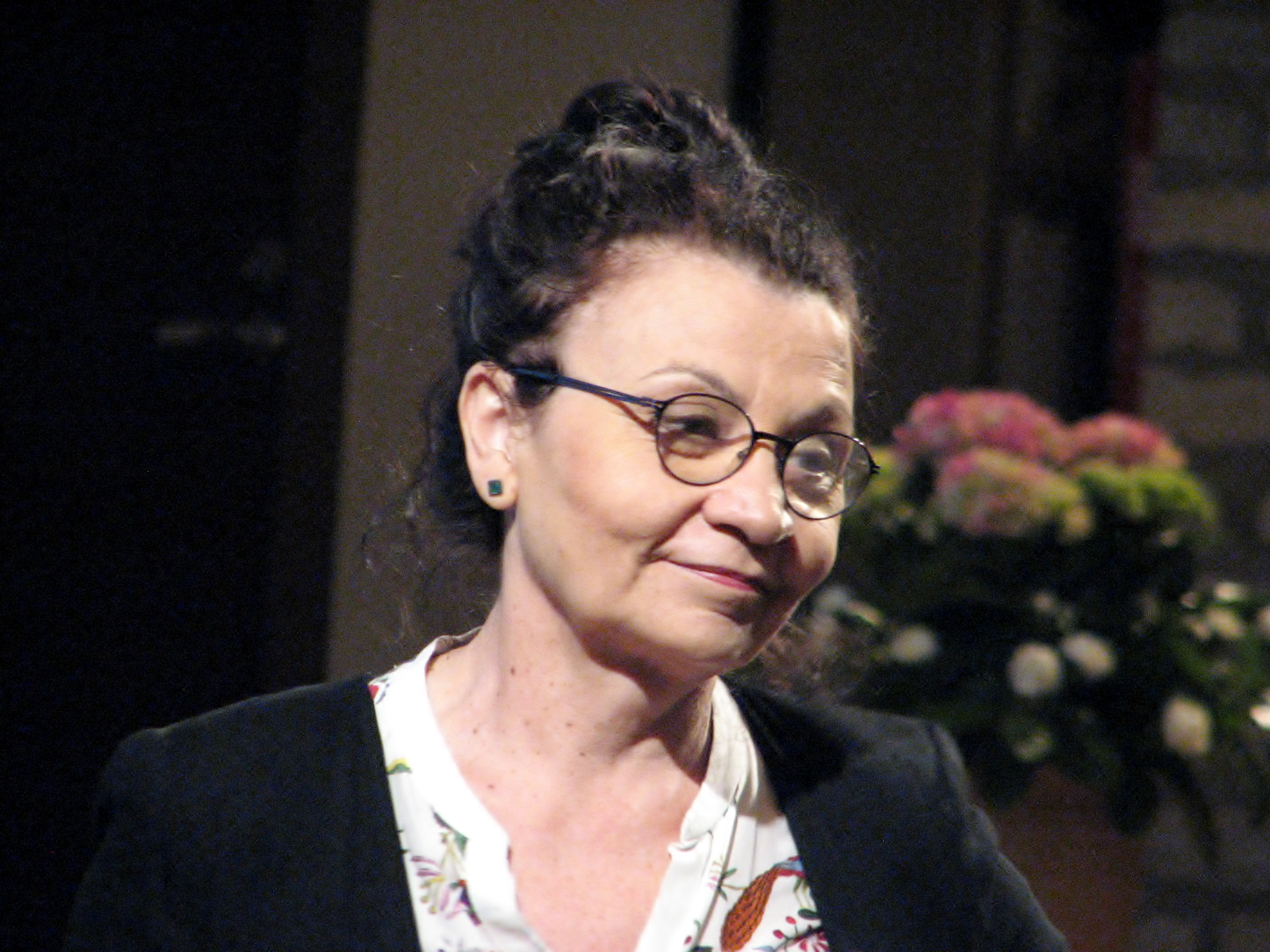
Lukk-Toompere at Regina

Regina Lukk-Toompere (born 23 August 1953) is an Estonian illustrator.

In 1981 she graduated from Estonian State Art Institute's Graphic Art Department in illustration and book design.

She belongs to the following organizations: the Estonian Artists' Association, the Estonian Graphic Designers' Association, and the Estonian Section of IBBY.

She has illustrated over 90 books and textbooks.
