= Kaarin Kivirähk =

Estonian art critic and curator (born 1993)

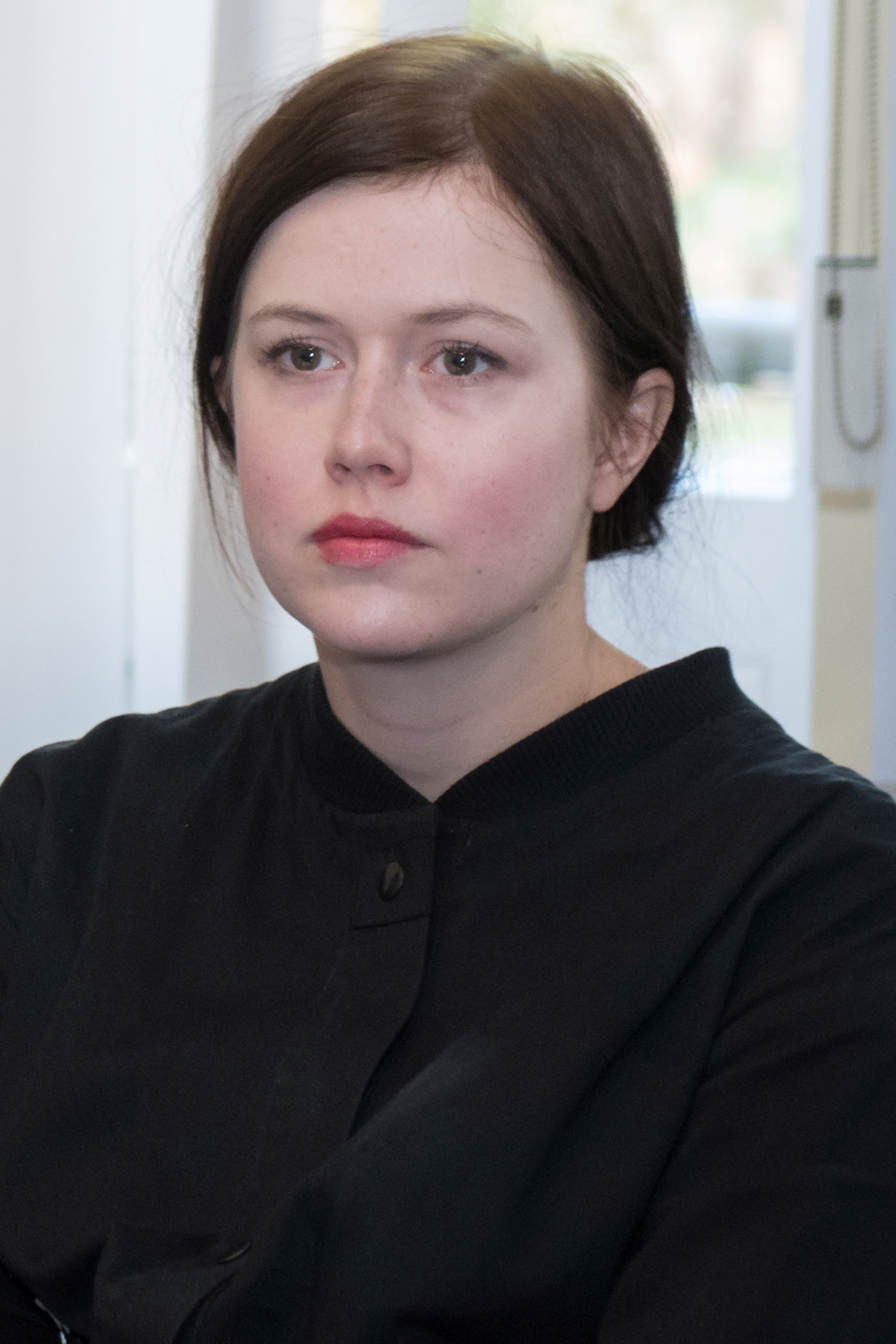
- Kivirähk in 2018
- Born: 22 May 1993 (age 33); Tallinn, Estonia
- Citizenship: Estonian
- Education: University of Tartu (BA); Tallinn University (MA)
- Occupations: Cultural theorist, art critic, curator, journalist
- Parent(s): Andrus Kivirähk (father); Ilona Martson (mother)
- Relatives: Ants Kivirähk (grandfather); Ingrid Kivirähk (grandmother); Juhan Kivirähk (uncle)

Kaarin Kivirähk (born 22 May 1993 in Tallinn) is an Estonian cultural theorist, art critic, curator and journalist. She is a figure in the Estonian contemporary art scene. She is currently serving as the editor-in-chief for the Estonian Centre for Contemporary Art (CCA) as well as for the art magazine A Shade Colder.

== Biography ==
=== Early life ===
She graduated from the Tallinn French Lyceum in 2011. Kivirähk earned her bachelor's degree in art history in 2014 from the University of Tartu. She later completed a master's degree in cultural theory at Tallinn University. Her bachelor's thesis was titled "Self-assertion: The role of fashion exhibitions in art museums and galleries in the contemporary Estonian art world." In 2017, she defended her master's thesis at Tallinn University titled "Art takes up little space: Estonian art journalism from 1997–2013 using the example of coverage of the Venice Biennales."

She is a member of the academic sorority Korporatsioon Filiae Patriae.

=== Career ===
Kivirähk began her career in art journalism and communications, eventually becoming the editor-in-chief of the CCA's weekly web magazine. She frequently contributes columns on contemporary art and visual culture to the Estonian daily newspaper Postimees. Since 2014, she has worked at the Estonian Centre for Contemporary Art (CCA) as a communications and project manager, and serves as the editor-in-chief of the art magazine A Shade Colder. She has managed international communications for the Estonian Pavilion at the Venice Biennale and worked on projects such as the Baltic Triennial 13. Her work often focuses on regional contemporary art developments and curatorial research across the Nordic-Baltic region.

Working within a collective at the CCA alongside Marika Agu, Maria Arusoo, and Sten Ojavee, Kivirähk co-curated the exhibition A-tishoo, A-tishoo, We All Fall Down at the Contemporary Art Museum of Estonia (EKKM) in 2019. In 2023, the same collective was appointed to curate the 11th edition of the artist-run biennial Sequences in Reykjavík, Iceland.

=== Personal life ===
Kivirähk is the eldest daughter of the author Andrus Kivirähk and journalist Ilona Martson. She has two younger siblings: Liisa and Teele. In 2024, she gave birth to a son.

== Selected works ==
| Date | Title | Publication | Reference |
|---|---|---|---|
| October 2025 | Practices in Dialogue | Practices in Dialogue (A Shade Colder) | |
| October 2025 | Paul O’Neill: A rethinking of curatorial relations is necessary | Practices in Dialogue (A Shade Colder) | |
| April 2025 | Looking back | Uncertain Territories (A Shade Colder) | |
| April 2025 | Stuck in the vicious circle of words | Uncertain Territories (A Shade Colder) | |
| April 2024 | Art and solidarity | The Many Faces of You (A Shade Colder) | |
| April 2024 | Discovering the Southern part of Estonia (A Shade Colder) | The Many Faces of You | |
| November 2023 | Editorial. The Shapes of Language | The Shapes of Language (A Shade Colder) | |
| November 2023 | Organising against precarity | The Shapes of Language (A Shade Colder) | |
| July 2023 | From home sweet home to an object of speculation: Interview with architects Aet Ader, Arvi Anderson and Mari Möldre | Flesh in Tension (A Shade Colder) | |
| April 2023 | Timelines in Transit. Where Do We Go from Here? | Shifting Timelines (A Shade Colder) | |
