= Veiko Belials =

Estonian writer, poet and translator

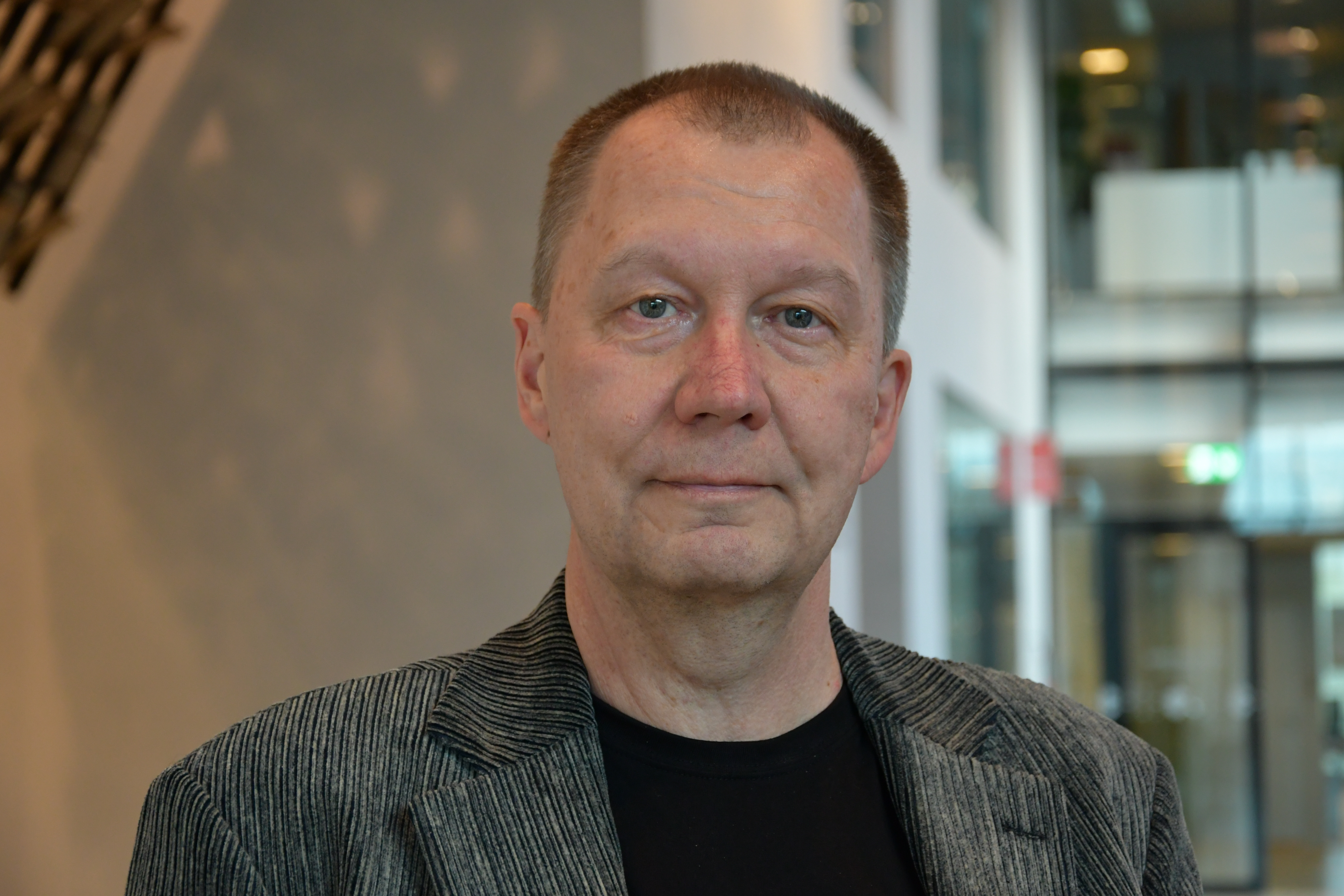
Veiko Belials (2025)

Veiko Belials (born 20 July 1966 in Tapa) is an Estonian writer, poet, and translator.

In 1991, he graduated from the Estonian Academy of Agriculture, studying forestry. In 2003, he graduated from the University of Tartu, studying to be a teacher of technical disciplines.

Since 2000, he has been a teacher at Luua Forestry School.

He is a member of the Estonian Writers' Union.

== Works ==
He has published five poetry collections, several science fiction books, and one children's book.
