= Andrus Kivirähk =

Estonian writer (born 1970)

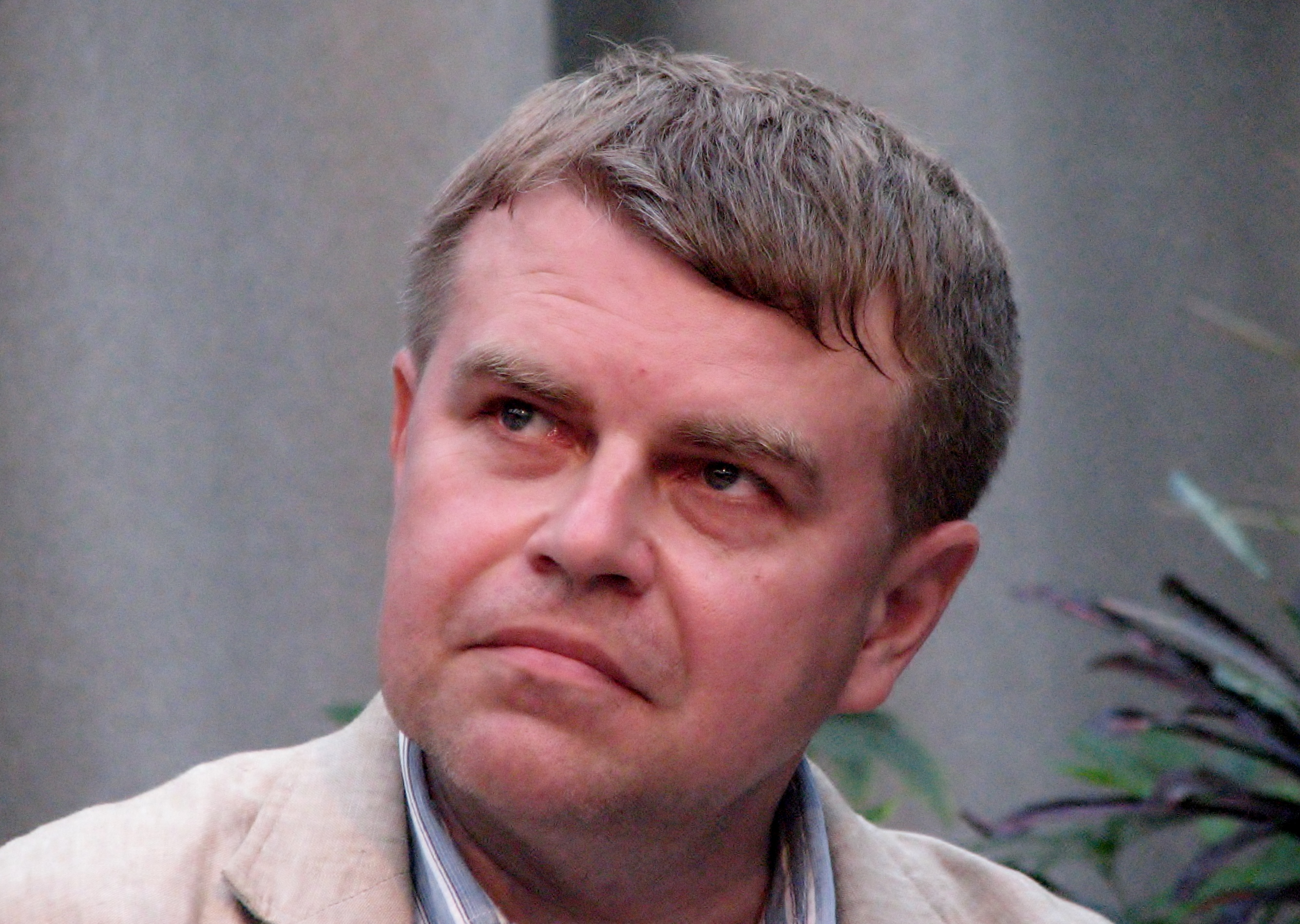
- Andrus Kivirähk presenting the new edition of the book "The Butterfly" at an autograph session during the jubilee celebrations of the Estonia Theatre house.
- Born: 17 August 1970 (age 56); Tallinn, then part of Estonian SSR, Soviet Union
- Occupations: author; playwright; topical satirist; screenwriter
- Spouse: Ilona Martson (also known as Ilona Kivirähk)
- Children: 3, including Kaarin Kivirähk
- Parent(s): Ants Kivirähk (father); Ingrid Kivirähk (mother)
- Relatives: Juhan Kivirähk (brother)
- Writing career
- Period: 1990–present
- Genres: Satire; fantasy; children's literature; drama
- Notable works: The Man Who Spoke Snakish; Old Barny or November; Lotte from Gadgetville; Ivan Orava mälestused
- Notable awards: Order of the White Star, V Class (2004); Annual Children's Literature Award (2018); Jānis Baltvilks Prize (2011, 2013); Eduard Vilde Literary Award (2016)

Andrus Kivirähk (born 17 August 1970) is an Estonian author, playwright, screenwriter, and satirist. He writes across genres for both adults and children, including satirical columns and screenplays. Many of his stories have been adapted into films. A number of his works have also been translated into multiple languages. Kivirähk has received awards in children's literature in Estonia and internationally. He often mixes elements of dark humor, Estonian folklore, fantasy, and social commentary in his writing.

As of 2004, his novel Rehepapp ehk November (Old Barny or November) had sold 25,000 copies, making him the most popular Estonian writer of the 21st century. His book The Man Who Spoke Snakish (Mees, kes teadis ussisõnu, 2007) has been one of the top-selling books in Estonia. He is known for his children's series Lotte, Oskar and the Things, and Sirli, Siim ja saladused (Sirli, Siim and the Secrets). His works Lotte and Rehepapp ehk November have been adapted for the screen.

== Early life ==
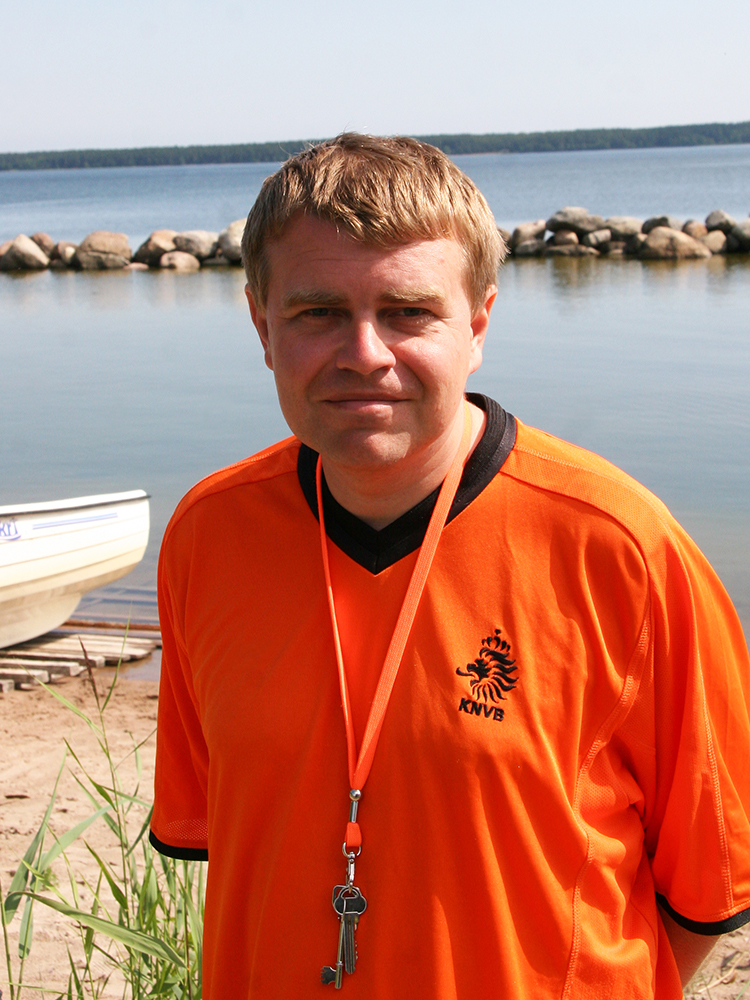
Andrus Kivirähk, in July 2009 in Käsmu, Estonia

He was born in Tallinn on August 17, 1970. His mother, Ingrid Kivirähk (née Kasesalu, 1931–2024), was a puppeteer and actor at the Estonian Puppet Theatre (Nukuteater). His father, actor and theatre director Ants Kivirähk, died when he was fifteen. He grew up with an older brother, Juhan Kivirähk, a sociologist.

He graduated from Tallinn 32nd Secondary School in 1988. He continued his education at the University of Tartu, where he studied journalism. As a schoolboy, he got paid five-rouble money orders for his short stories, which he picked up from the Press House on Pärnu Road. He graduated from university in 1993.

While studying journalism at Tartu University, he continued to work with Pikker. During his fourth year at university, he joined the cultural department of the daily newspaper Eesti Päevaleht. It was here, from 1992 to 1993, that the character he is most well-known for, Ivan Orav, was written. Kivirähk developed stories about Orav by drawing on chapters from a contemporary history textbook and reimagining the events through Orav's distorted and humorous perspective. He has contributed weekly satirical columns to Eesti Päevaleht and many of his books first appeared in the newspaper before becoming books.

== Career ==
=== Literary career ===
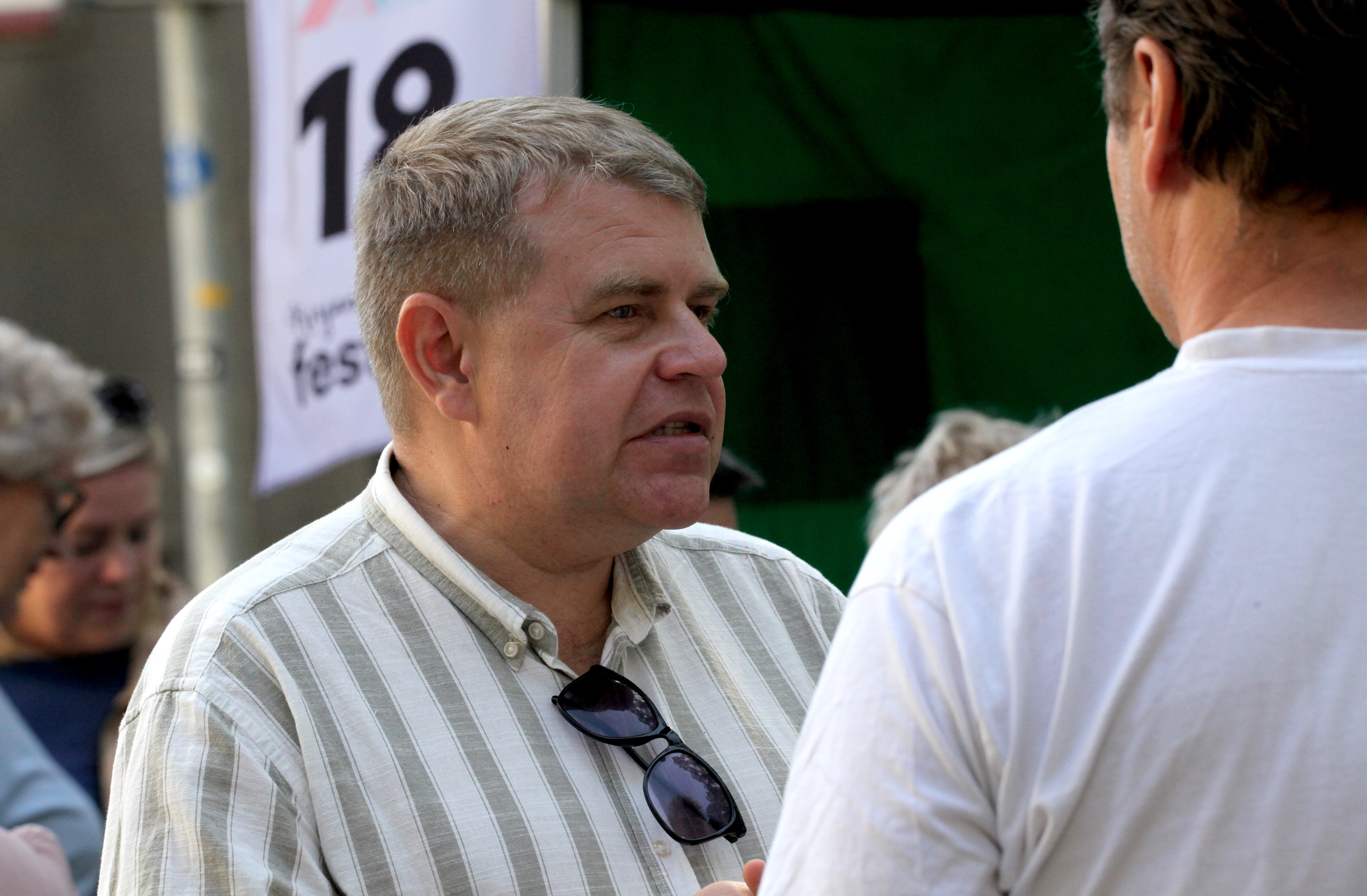
Andrus Kivirähk at the annual Literary Street festival 2021 in Tallinn, Estonia

His early humor writing used clichés, exaggerations, intentionally integrated strange elements, and wordplay to draw attention to and to poke fun at societal and political problems. These techniques later influenced his satirical writing and journalism. Kivirähk's writing style was heavily inspired by Friedrich Reinhold Kreutzwald. His writing contains folk-oriented humour found similar to that in the works of Oskar Luts. The focus on national issues he integrates into his writing is also similar to the writing of Anton Hansen Tammsaare. He also shares elements of dark humour and social allegory similar to the satire and magical realism of Mikhail Bulgakov. The novel inspired a 2001 stage play, a 2013 opera, and the 2017 film adaptation November, directed by Rainer Sarnet. His 2007 fantasy novel The Man Who Spoke Snakish (Mees, kes teadis ussisõnu) explores the decline of ancient Estonian culture.

Kivirähk's work has created space for modern Estonian fiction based on traditional stories and folklore. Kivirähk's reclamation of satire in the genre of folklore has been credited by scholars, such as Piret Noorhani, as representing a form of postmodernist national literature that uses tactics from comedy, like irony and parody, to both critique national identity and revive it. By subverting traditional categories and beliefs, his writing brings folklore out of the historical record and allows it to be reinterpreted. His work often contains elements of examining the past and memory. Many of his characters gain empathy for the past throughout their interactions.

Kivirähk is also a children's author, with over a dozen published children's books.His 1999 book Sirli, Siim ja saladused explores loneliness and dream worlds. The Lotte series began with Lotte reis lõunamaale (2002) and continued with Leiutajateküla Lotte (2006). He also wrote Sibulad ja šokolaad [Onions and Chocolate] in 2002.

Kivirähk's work has gained international recognition, with his writings translated into over 20 languages.

Language	Year	Title (English)	Title (Estonian)	Translated title	Translator	Publisher
Dutch	2015	The Man Who Spoke Snakish	Mees, kes teadis ussisõnu	De man die de taal van slangen sprak		Prometheus
English	2015	The Man Who Spoke Snakish	Mees, kes teadis ussisõnu	The Man Who Spoke Snakish	Christopher Moseley	Black Cat
Finnish	2018	Carnival and Potato Salad	Karneval ja kartulisalat	Kun Musti muni mummon		WSOY
Finnish	2016	Poo and Spring	Kaka ja kevad	Koiranne alkaa kohta kukkia		Otava
Finnish	2008	Lotte from Gadgetville	Leiutajateküla Lotte	Keksijäkylän Lotta		Otava
Finnish	2000	Old Barny or November	Rehepapp ehk November	Riihiukko	Kaisu Lahikainen	Otava
French	2013	The Man Who Spoke Snakish	Mees, kes teadis ussisõnu	L'Homme qui savait la langue des serpents	Jean-Pierre Minaudier	Éditions Le Tripode
French	2017	The Butterfly	Liblikas	Le Papillon		Éditions Le Tripode
French	2014	Old Barny or November	Rehepapp ehk November	Les Groseilles de novembre		Éditions Le Tripode
German	2015	A Frog Kiss	Konna musi	Frösche küssen		Willegoos
German	2015	Poo and Spring	Kaka ja kevad	Der Schiet und das Frühjahr		Willegoos
German	2017	The Man Who Spoke Snakish	Mees, kes teadis ussisõnu	Der Mann, der mit Schlangen sprach		Klett-Cotta
German	2015	Poo and Spring	Kaka ja kevad	De Schiet un dat Fröhjohr (Low German)		Plaggenhauer
Hungarian	2005	Blue Wagon	Helesinine vagun	Kék vagon		Kráter Műhely Egyesület
Hungarian	2008	Sirli, Siim and the Secrets	Sirli, Siim ja saladused	Sári, Samu és a titkok		Cerkabella
Hungarian	2011	Breviary	Breviárium	Breviárium		Észt Intézet / Pluralica
Hungarian	2015	The Man Who Spoke Snakish	Mees, kes teadis ussisõnu	Az ember, aki beszélte a kígyók nyelvét		Typotex
Hungarian	2018	Old Barny or November	Rehepapp ehk November	Ördöngős idők		Gondolat Kiadói Kör
Hungarian	2021	Blue Horned Animal	Sinine sarvedega loom	Szépséges kék állat		Gondolat Kiadói Kör
Italian	2019	Lotte's Journey South	Lotte reis lõunamaale	Lotte. L'avventuroso viaggio al sud		De Bastiani
Italian	2022	The Man Who Spoke Snakish	Mees, kes teadis ussisõnu	L'uomo che sapeva la lingua dei serpenti		La nave di Teseo
Latvian	2019	Lotte from Gadgetville	Leiutajateküla Lotte	Lote no Izgudrotāju ciema		Zvaigzne ABC
Latvian	2018	Oskar and the Things	Oskar ja asjad	Oskars un lietas		Liels un mazs
Latvian	2016	Carnival and Potato Salad	Karneval ja kartulisalat	Karnevāls un kartupeļu salāti		Liels un mazs
Latvian	2013	Lotte's Journey South	Lotte reis lõunamaale	Lotes ceļojums uz dienvidiem		Zvaigzne ABC
Latvian	2012	Poo and Spring	Kaka ja kevad	Kaka un pavasaris		Liels un mazs
Latvian	2009	Sirli, Siim and the Secrets	Sirli, Siim ja saladused	Sirli, Sīms un noslēpumi		Liels un mazs
Latvian	2022	The Man Who Spoke Snakish	Mees, kes teadis ussisõnu	Vīrs, kas zināja čūskuvārdus		Latvijas Mediji
Latvian	2012	The Man Who Spoke Snakish	Mees, kes teadis ussisõnu	Vīrs, kas zināja čūskuvārdus		Lauku Avīze
Lithuanian	2010	Sirli, Siim and the Secrets	Sirli, Siim ja saladused	Sirlė, Simas ir slėpiniai		Kronta
Lithuanian	2020	The Man Who Spoke Snakish	Mees, kes teadis ussisõnu	Žmogus, mokėjęs gyvačių kalbą	Agnė Bernotaitė-Jakubčionienė	Aukso žuvys
Lithuanian	2023	Old Barny or November	Rehepapp ehk November	Jaujininkas	Milda Kurpniece	Aukso žuvys
Polish	2018	Oskar and the Things	Oskar ja asjad	Oskar i rzeczy		Widnokrąg
Polish	2020	The Man Who Spoke Snakish	Mees, kes teadis ussisõnu	Człowiek, który znał mowę węży	Anna Michalczuk-Podlecki	Marpress
Polish	2021	Old Barny or November	Rehepapp ehk November	Listopadowe porzeczki	Anna Michalczuk-Podlecki	Wydawnictwo Literackie
Russian	2014	The Man Who Spoke Snakish	Mees, kes teadis ussisõnu	Последний, кто знал змеиную молвь (Posledniy, kto znal zmeinuyu molv)		Октопус
Russian	2019	Oskar and the Things	Oskar ja asjad	Оскар и вещи (Oskar i veshchi)		КПД
Russian	2017	Lotte's Journey South	Lotte reis lõunamaale	Путешествие Лотты в тёплые края (Puteshestviye Lotty v tyoplyye kraya)		Eesti Joonisfilm
Russian	2016	Carnival and Potato Salad	Karneval ja kartulisalat	Карнавал и картофельный салат (Karnaval i kartofel'nyy salat)		Varrak
Russian	2014	A Frog Kiss	Konna musi	Поцелуй лягушку! (Potseluy lyagushku!)		Varrak
Russian	2010	Poo and Spring	Kaka ja kevad	Весна и какашка (Vesna i kakashka)		Varrak
Russian	2009	Limpa and the Pirates	Limpa ja mereröövlid	Лимпа и пираты (Limpa i piraty)		Varrak
Russian	2009	Lotte from Gadgetville	Leiutajateküla Lotte	Лотте из Деревни Изобретателей (Lotte iz Derevni Izobretateley)		Eesti Päevaleht
Russian	2008	Giraffe	Kaelkirjak	Жираф (Zhiraf)		КПД
Russian	2008	Sirli, Siim and the Secrets	Sirli, Siim ja saladused	Сирли, Сийм и секреты (Sirli, Siym i sekrety)		КПД
Slovenian	2015	Sirli, Siim and the Secrets	Sirli, Siim ja saladused	Sara, Simon in skrivnosti		KUD Sodobnost International
Spanish	2017	The Man Who Spoke Snakish	Mees, kes teadis ussisõnu	El hombre que hablaba serpiente		Impedimenta
Japanese	2021	The Man Who Spoke Snakish	Mees, kes teadis ussisõnu	蛇の言葉を話した男 (Hebi no kotoba o hanashita otoko)	Ryoko Sekiguchi	Kawade Shobo Shinsha

He has been a member of the Estonian Writers' Union (in Estonian: Eesti Kirjanike Liit) since 1996.

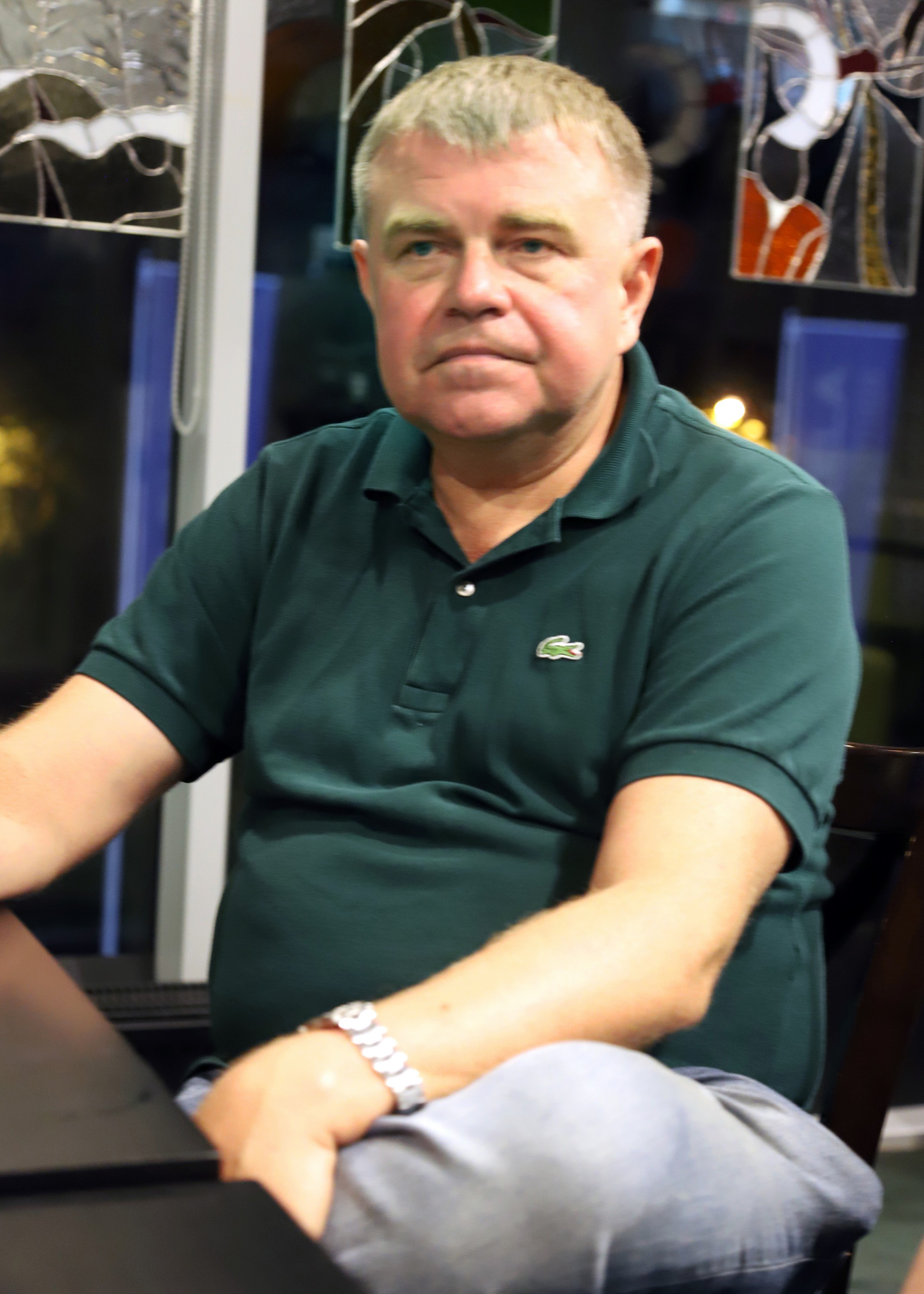
Kivirähk in 2024

=== Broadcast journalism career ===
Since 1995, Kivirähk has co-hosted the satirical weekly radio show, Rahva Oma Kaitse (The People's Own Defense), on the Raadio 2 channel of Estonian public broadcaster ERR alongside Mart Juur. The weekly live broadcast provides commentary on domestic and international politics. The show celebrated its 30th anniversary in 2025. The weekly program combines journalism with comedic takes on current events. The show broadcasts live every Tuesday at 19:00 with replays on Sundays at 12:00.

=== Stage and screen career ===
Kivirähk has written several plays and screenplays. He often writes plays with absurd humor. As with his other work, it often engages with Estonian history. He debuted with Vanamehed seitsmendalt in 1992. In 2000, he wrote and directed Papagoide päevad at the Estonian Drama Theatre. He adapted his novel Rehepapp for the stage in 2001. Other works include Adolf Rühka lühikene elu (2005) and Voldemar (2007), directed by Merle Karusoo.He wrote and directed Köster at the Tallinn City Theatre in 2016. Recent plays include Kaarnakivi perenaine (2017) and Isamaa pääsukesed (2018).

Kivirähk co-wrote the screenplay for the animated feature Lotte from Gadgetville (2006) with directors Heiki Ernits and Janno Põldma. He also wrote scripts for Lotte ja kuukivi saladus (2011) and Lotte ja kadunud lohed (2019). In 2023, he wrote and appeared in the hybrid film Kaka, kevad ja teised. In television, he wrote the comedy mini-series Vabariigi valvur (1994–1995).

== Awards and honors ==
Andrus Kivirähk has received recognition for his contributions to Estonian literature, drama, and journalism. He has earned both domestic and international awards throughout his career. His literary work was honored by the Cultural Endowment of Estonia, and he has received the state's prestigious Order of the White Star, fifth class. Internationally, his novel The Man Who Spoke Snakish gained significant traction. In France, he won the Grand Prix de l'Imaginaire in 2014. He also had multiple nominations for the Astrid Lindgren Memorial Award in the field of children's literature. He has received recognition for his work from the general public with his recurring success in the Nukits Competition, in which Estonian children vote for their favorite authors. He was the winner of the reader-nominated award in the Nukits Competition in 2006, 2008, and 2010.

Year	Awards	Work	Category	Result	Ref.
2020	Nukits Competition	The Ghost and Facebook	Children's Choice	1st place	
2018	Annual Children's Literature Award of the Cultural Endowment of Estonia	Tilda and the Dust Angel	Children's Literature	Won	
2018	"Järje Hoidja" Award of the Tallinn Central Library	Tilda and the Dust Angel	Children's Literature	Won	
2018	Good Children's Book	Tilda and the Dust Angel	Children's Literature	Selected	
2016	Astrid Lindgren Memorial Award	Career achievement	Children's Literature	Candidate	
2016	Tartu Prize for Children's Literature	Oskar and the Things	Childhood Prize	Won	
2016	Eduard Vilde Literary Award	Oskar and the Things	Literature	Won	
2016	Nukits Competition	Carnival and Potato Salad	Children's Choice	2nd place	
2015	Good Children's Book	Oskar and the Things	Children's Literature	Selected	
2015	The White Ravens	Big Toell	Children's Literature	Selected	
2014	Grand Prix de l'Imaginaire (France)	The Man Who Spoke Snakish	Best Foreign Novel	Won	
2013	Jānis Baltvilks Prize (Latvia)	Poo and Spring	Children's Literature	Won	
2013	Good Children's Book	A Frog Kiss	Children's Literature	Selected	
2012	Astrid Lindgren Memorial Award	Career achievement	Children's Literature	Candidate	
2011	Jānis Baltvilks Prize (Latvia)	Lotte from Gadgetville	Children's Literature	Won	
2010	Nukits Competition	Poo and Spring	Children's Choice	1st place	
2010	Children and Young Adult Jury (Latvia)	Sirli, Siim and the Secrets	Children's Literature	2nd place	
2008	IBBY Honour List	Lotte from Gadgetville	Children's Literature	Selected	
2008	Nukits Competition	Lotte from Gadgetville	Children's Choice	1st place	
2007	Republic of Estonia State Culture Award	Lotte from Gadgetville & plays	Culture	Won	
2006	Nukits Competition	Limpa and the Pirates	Children's Choice	1st place	
2005	Raisin of the Year Award	Bed-time stories for Estonian fathers	Children's Literature	Won	
2004	The Order of the White Star (V class)	Service to Culture	State Decoration	Honored	
2004	Nukits Competition	Lotte's Journey South	Children's Choice	2nd place	
2004	"Järje Hoidja" Award of the Tallinn Central Library	Limpa and the Pirates	Children's Literature	Won	
2000	Annual Cultural Endowment of Estonia Award	Lotte (for the animated feature film Lotte, together with Heiki Ernits, Janno Põldma, Regina Lukk-Toompere and Olav Ehala)	Audio-visual Arts	Won	

== Personal life ==
Kivirähk is married to journalist and translator Ilona Martson (also known as Ilona Kivirähk). She is the editor-in-chief of the children's magazine Täheke. They have three daughters: Kaarin, Liisa, and Teele. Their first grandchild was born in March 2024. Their eldest daughter is art critic and curator, Kaarin Kivirähk.
