= List of Estonian animated films =

List of animated films made in Estonia.

== Republic of Estonia 1918-1940 ==
Title	English Title	Director	Awards	Genre	Notes
1931
Kutsu-Juku seiklusi	The Adventures of Juku The Dog	Voldemar Päts		Cutout animation	

== Estonian SSR 1940-1991 ==
List of Estonian animated films made in the Estonian SSR 1940-1991

=== 1950s ===
Title	English Title	Director	Awards	Genre	Notes
1958
Peetrikese unenägu	Little Peeter's Dream	Elbert Tuganov		Puppetoon animation	
1959
Põhjakonn	Northern dragon	Elbert Tuganov		Puppetoon animation	

=== 1960s ===
Title	English Title	Director	Awards	Genre	Notes
1960
Metsamuinasjutt		Elbert Tuganov		Puppetoon animation	
1961
Ott kosmoses		Elbert Tuganov		Puppetoon animation	
Mina ja Murri		Elbert Tuganov		Puppetoon animation	
1962
Peaaegu uskumatu lugu		Elbert Tuganov		Puppetoon animation	
Kaks lugu		Elbert Tuganov		Puppetoon animation	
Väike motoroller		Heino Pars		Puppetoon animation	
1963
Talent		Elbert Tuganov		Puppetoon animation	
Just nii!		Elbert Tuganov		Puppetoon animation	
1964
Tublid loomad		Elbert Tuganov		Puppetoon animation	
Operaator Kõps seeneriigis		Heino Pars		Puppetoon animation	
1965
Lapsed ja puu		Elbert Tuganov		Puppetoon animation	
Operaator Kõps marjariigis		Heino Pars		Puppetoon animation	
Jaak ja robot		Heino Pars		Puppetoon animation	
1966
Park		Elbert Tuganov		Puppetoon animation	
Jonn		Elbert Tuganov		Puppetoon animation	
Operaator Kõps üksikul saarel		Heino Pars		Puppetoon animation	
1967
Žanri sünd		Elbert Tuganov		Puppetoon animation	
Kurepoeg		Elbert Tuganov		Puppetoon animation	
Vanapagan sulast kauplemas		Heino Pars		Puppetoon animation	
Jussikese seitse sõpra		Heino Pars		Puppetoon animation	
1968
Hammasratas		Elbert Tuganov		Puppetoon animation	
Ahvipoeg Fips		Elbert Tuganov		Puppetoon animation	
Operaator Kõps kiviriigis		Heino Pars		Puppetoon animation	
1969
Eesel, heeringas ja nõialuud		Elbert Tuganov		Puppetoon animation	
Uhti, uhti uhkesti!		Heino Pars		Puppetoon animation	
Lindude ja loomade sõda		Heino Pars		Puppetoon animation	

=== 1970s ===
Title	English Title	Director	Awards	Genre	Notes
1970
Aatomik ja jõmmid		Elbert Tuganov		Puppetoon animation	
Aatomik		Elbert Tuganov		Puppetoon animation	
Lumeveski		Heino Pars		Puppetoon animation	
1971
Jalakäijad		Elbert Tuganov		Puppetoon animation	
Putukate suvemängud		Heino Pars		Puppetoon animation	
Mardileib		Heino Pars		Puppetoon animation	
1972
Krõll		Elbert Tuganov		Puppetoon animation	
Ettevaatust, kaabel!		Elbert Tuganov		Puppetoon animation	
Autosõitjad		Elbert Tuganov		Puppetoon animation	
Nael		Heino Pars		Puppetoon animation	
Veekandja		Rein Raamat		Traditional animation	
Vari ja tee		Rein Raamat		Traditional animation	
1973
Uued sõbrad		Elbert Tuganov		Puppetoon animation	
Veealused		Heino Pars		Puppetoon animation	
Pallid		Heino Pars		Puppetoon animation	
Lend		Rein Raamat		Traditional animation	
Värvipliiatsid		Avo Paistik		Traditional animation	
1974
Verine John		Elbert Tuganov		Puppetoon animation	
Õed		Elbert Tuganov		Puppetoon animation with the using of real life	
Muinasjutt tema majesteedile		Heino Pars		Puppetoon animation	
Värvilind		Rein Raamat		Traditional animation	
Kilplased	The Gothamites	Rein Raamat		Traditional animation	
Täheke		Avo Paistik		Traditional animation	
1975
Inspiratsioon		Elbert Tuganov		Puppetoon animation	
Laulud kevadele		Heino Pars		Puppetoon animation	
Rüblik		Rein Raamat		Traditional animation	
Pisiasi		Avo Paistik		Traditional animation	
Lapsehoidjad		Aarne Ahi		Puppetoon animation	
1976
Kütt		Rein Raamat		Traditional animation	
Lask		Avo Paistik		Traditional animation	
1977
Suveniir		Elbert Tuganov		Puppetoon animation	
Kunksmoor		Heino Pars		Puppetoon animation	
Antennid jääs		Rein Raamat		Traditional animation	
Kas maakera on ümmargune?		Priit Pärn		Traditional animation	
Pühapäev		Avo Paistik		Traditional animation	
1978
Ja teeb trikke	Plays Tricks	Priit Pärn		Traditional animation	
Köpenicki kapten		Elbert Tuganov		Puppetoon animation	
Kunksmoor ja kapten Trumm		Heino Pars		Puppetoon animation	
Telemükse		Kalju Kurepõld		Traditional animation	
Veidi viltu		Kalju Kurepõld		Traditional animation	
Põld		Rein Raamat		Traditional animation	
Kas on ikka rasvane?		Rein Raamat		Traditional animation	
Tolmuimeja		Avo Paistik		Traditional animation	
Klaabu		Avo Paistik		Traditional animation	
Linalakk ja Rosalind		Aarne Ahi		Puppetoon animation	
1979
Kaupmees ja ahvid		Elbert Tuganov		Puppetoon animation	
Giufa		Elbert Tuganov		Puppetoon animation	
Kui mehed laulavad		Heino Pars		Puppetoon animation	
Klaabu, Nipi ja tige kala		Avo Paistik		Traditional animation	

=== 1980s ===
Title	English Title	Director	Awards	Genre	Notes
1980
Ohver		Elbert Tuganov		Puppetoon animation	
Välek vibulane		Heino Pars		Puppetoon animation	
Suur Tõll		Rein Raamat		Traditional animation	
Karsumm		Aarne Ahi		Puppetoon animation	
1981
Õunkimmel		Elbert Tuganov		Puppetoon animation	
Harjutusi iseseisvaks eluks	Some Exercises in Preparation of an Independent Life	Priit Pärn		Traditional animation	
Klaabu kosmoses		Avo Paistik		Traditional animation	
Paberileht		Kalju Kivi		Puppetoon animation	
1982
Kolmnurk	The Triangle	Priit Pärn		Traditional animation	
Oinas ja roos		Kalju Kurepõld		Puppetoon animation	
Primadonna		Kalju Kurepõld		Puppetoon animation	
Pagar ja korstnapühkija		Kalju Kivi		Puppetoon animation	
1983
Meemeistrite linn		Heino Pars		Puppetoon animation	
Põrgu		Rein Raamat		Traditional animation	
Tuvitädi		Rao Heidmets		Puppetoon animation	
Sõlm		Kalju Kivi		Puppetoon animation	
1984
Aeg maha	Time Out	Priit Pärn		Traditional animation	
Naerupall		Heino Pars		Puppetoon animation	
Naksitrallid		Avo Paistik		Traditional animation	
Tähe mõrsja		Kalju Kivi		Puppetoon animation	
1985
Seitse kuradit		Heino Pars		Puppetoon animation	
Kerjus		Rein Raamat		Traditional animation	
Hüpe		Avo Paistik		Traditional animation	
Vägev vähk ja ahne naine		Aarne Ahi		Puppetoon animation	
Nuril		Rao Heidmets		Puppetoon animation	
Klaasikillumäng		Kalju Kivi		Puppetoon animation	
1986
Elujõgi		Heino Pars		Puppetoon animation	
Kaelkirjak		Rao Heidmets		Puppetoon animation	
1987
Eine murul	Breakfast on the Grass	Priit Pärn		Traditional animation	
Naksitrallid II		Avo Paistik		Traditional animation	
Magus planeet		Aarne Ahi		Puppetoon animation	
Serenaad		Rao Heidmets		Puppetoon animation	
1988
Hernes		Heino Pars		Puppetoon animation	
Linn		Rein Raamat		Traditional animation	
Lend		Avo Paistik		Traditional animation	
Linnupüüdja		Aarne Ahi		Puppetoon animation	
Papa Carlo teater		Rao Heidmets		Puppetoon animation	
Miks puud ei kõnele		Kalju Kivi		Puppetoon animation	
1989
Silmus		Avo Paistik		Traditional animation	
Noblesse oblige		Rao Heidmets		Puppetoon animation	
Tõus		Kalju Kivi		Puppetoon animation	
1990
Päkapikud piiluvad		Heino Pars		Puppetoon animation	
Naksitrallid		Avo Paistik		Traditional animation	Feature film
Minek		Avo Paistik		Traditional animation	

== Republic of Estonia since 1991 ==
List of Estonian animated films made in Republic of Estonia since 1991.

=== 1990s ===
Title	English Title	Director	Awards	Genre	Notes
1991
Kingikratt		Aarne Ahi		Puppetoon animation	
Päkapikupuu		Rao Heidmets		Puppetoon animation	
Sokk		Kalju Kivi		Puppetoon animation	
Talvepäev		Leo Lätti		Traditional animation	
1992
Hotell E	Hotel E	Priit Pärn		Traditional animation	
Sprott võtmas päikest	The Smoked Sprat Baking in the Sun	Mati Kütt		Traditional animation	
Otto elu	Otto´s Life	Janno Põldma		Pixilation/Puppetoon animation	
Incipit vita nova		Hardi Volmer		Pixilation	
1993
Kapsapea	Cabbage Head	Riho Unt		Puppetoon animation	
Meistritükk	Masterpiece	Mikk Rand		Pixilation	
Ja õitseski	And It Bloomed …	Mait Laas		Traditional animation	
1994
Elutuba		Rao Heidmets		Pixilation	
Hilinenud romanss	Twilight Romance	Hardi Volmer		Puppetoon animation	
Jõulukalender	Calendar of Christmas	Riho Unt		Puppetoon animation	
1995
1895	1895	Priit Pärn, Janno Põldma		Traditional animation	
XXXX või ASA		Mikk Rand		Pixilation	
Humachinoid	Humachinoid	Kalju Kivi		Cutout animation	
Porgandite öö	Night of the Carrots	Priit Pärn		Traditional animation	
Plekkmäe Liidi	LITTLE LILLY	Mati Kütt		Traditional animation	
Tallinna legendid	Legends of Tallinn	Heiki Ernits, Leo Lätti		Traditional animation	
1996
Hreidar Tobuke	Hreidar the Stupid	Siggi		Puppetoon animation	
Keegi veel	Somebody Else	Hardi Volmer, Mait Laas		Pixilation	
Gravitatsioon	Gravitation	Priit Tender		Traditional animation	
1997
Urpo ja Turpo	Urpo and Turpo	Riho Unt		Puppetoon animation	
Päevavalgus	Daylight	Mait Laas		Puppetoon animation	
Põrandaalune	Underground	Mati Kütt		Pixilation/Cutout animation	
Tagasi Euroopasse	Back to Europe	Riho Unt		Puppetoon animation	
Kaerajaan		Mikk Rand		Puppetoon animation	
Tom ja Fluffy	Tom and Fluffy	Heiki Ernits, Leo Lätti, Janno Põldma		Traditional animation	
1998
Vares ja hiired	The Crow and the Mice	Mikk Rand, Priit Tender		Cutout animation	
Primavera		Hardi Volmer, Riho Unt		Puppetoon animation	
Bermuda		Ülo Pikkov		Traditional animation	
Just Märried	Just Married	Peep Pedmanson		Cutout animation	
Porgandite öö	Night of the Carrots	Priit Pärn		Traditional animation	
1999
Viola		Priit Tender		Traditional animation	
Cappuccino		Ülo Pikkov		Traditional animation	
Armastuse võimalikkusest	On the Possibility of Love	Janno Põldma		Traditional animation	

=== 2000s ===
Title	English Title	Director	Awards	Genre	Notes
2000
Teekond nirvaanasse	The Way to Nirvana	Mait Laas		Multimedia	
Eilne vedur		Kalju Kivi		Puppetoon animation	
Lotte reis lõunamaale	Lotte's Journey South	Heiki Ernits, Janno Põldma		Traditional animation	
Saamueli internet	Saamuel´s Internet	Riho Unt, Piret Saarepuu		Puppetoon animation	
Eilne vedur	Yesterday’s Engine	Kalju Kivi, Mikk Rand		Puppetoon animation	
2001
Vaala hing / Hvalens Sjel	The Soul of the Whale / Hvalens Sjel	Lisbeth Narud		Puppetoon animation	
Tulelaeva kulid	The Lightship Kulis	Paavo Matsin, Mait Laas		Cutout animation	
Guf – katedraal sündimata hingedele	The Guf – A Cathedral of Unborn Souls	Jelena Girlin		Puppetoon animation	
Heinaloom		Rao Heidmets		Puppetoon animation	
Lepatriinude jõulud	Ladybirds' Christmas	Heiki Ernits, Janno Põldma		Traditional animation	
Mont Blanc		Priit Tender		Traditional animation	
Superlove		Ülo Pikkov		Traditional animation	
Peata ratsanik	The Headless Horseman	Ülo Pikkov		Traditional animation	
2002
Jõehobu Jõksu lood	The Stories of Jippos Happy the Hippo	Andres Tenusaar		2D animation	
Kontsert porgandipirukale	Concert for a Carrot Pie	Heiki Ernits, Janno Põldma		Traditional animation	
Nööbi odüsseia		Mati Kütt		Traditional animation	
Hing sees	Having Soul	Julia Pihlak, Riho Unt		Puppetoon animation	
Pingviinide paraad	The Penguin Parade	Riho Unt		Puppetoon animation	
Rebasnaine	Fox Woman	Priit Tender		Traditional animation	
Weitzenbergi tänav	Weitzenberg Street	Kaspar Jancis		Traditional animation	
2003
Porgand!	The Carrot!	Pärtel Tall		Puppetoon animation	
Miriami jõulupäkapikk	Miriam´s Gnome	Mait Laas		Puppetoon animation	
Kuuvaatleja	Moonwatch	Mati Kütt		Puppetoon animation	
Karl ja Marilyn	Karl and Marilyn	Priit Pärn		Traditional animation	
Pehmed ja karvased		Hardi Volmer, Karin Nurm		Puppetoon animation	TV
Instinkt	Instinct	Rao Heidmets		Puppetoon animation	
Enigmatical love	Enigmatic Lover	Rao Heidmets		Puppetoon animation	
Barbarid	Barbarians	Hardi Volmer		Puppetoon animation	
Ahviaasta	The Year of the Monkey	Ülo Pikkov		Traditional animation	
2004
Miriam mängib peitust	Miriam Plays Hide and Seek	Priit Tender		Puppetoon animation	
Laud	The Table	Girlin Bassovskaja		Puppetoon animation	
Frank & Wendy	Frank and Wendy	Kaspar Jancis, Ülo Pikkov, Priit Tender		Traditional animation	
2005
Vennad Karusüdamed	Brothers Bearhearts	Riho Unt		Puppetoon animation	
Generatsioon	Generatio	Mait Laas		Multimedia	
Cricket		Mati Kütt		Puppetoon animation	
Crazy hours		Rao Heidmets		Cutout animation	
Conquistador		Rao Heidmets		Puppetoon animation	
Sõnum naabritele	Message to the Neighbours	Priit Tender		Traditional animation	
2006
Teatriporgand	Carrot of the Theatre	Pärtel Tall		Puppetoon animation	
Pärlimees	The Pearlman	Rao Heidmets		Puppetoon animation	
Miriami kana pesakast	Miriam's Nest Box	Riho Unt		Puppetoon animation	
Miriam merehädas	Miriam and the Flood	Riho Unt		Puppetoon animation	
Elu Maitse	Taste of Life	Ülo Pikkov		Traditional animation	
Leiutajateküla Lotte	Lotte from Gadgetville	Heiki Ernits, Janno Põldma		Traditional animation	
Maraton	Marathon	Kaspar Jancis		Traditional animation	
Une instituut	The Institute of The Dream	Mati Kütt		Multimedia	
Väike lühinägelik boamadu	The Little Short-Sighted Snake	Meelis Arulepp, Aina Järvine		Traditional animation	
2007
Must lagi	Black Ceiling	Heiki Ernits, Kaspar Jancis, Mati Kütt, Ülo Pikkov, Janno Põldma, Priit Pärn, Priit Tender		Traditional animation	
Kanapeletis ja seinameistrid		Katri Haardes, Elisabeth Salmin		Traditional animation	
The Scarecrow		Andres Tenusaar, Aleksandr Melkumov		Puppetoon animation	
Põhjakonn	North Dragon	Riho Unt		Puppetoon animation	
Seinameistrid	Wall Masters	Elisabeth Salmin		Traditional animation	
Miriami teatriseiklus	Miriam´s Theatre	Priit Tender		Puppetoon animation	
Miriami piknik / Hernehirmutis	Miriam´s Picnic / Scarecrow	Andres Tenusaar		Puppetoon animation	
Üks	One	Katri Haarde		Traditional animation	
Lõpuõhtu	Closing Session	Hardi Volmer		Puppetoon animation	
Kleit	The Dress	Mari-Liis Bassovskaja, Jelena Girlin		Puppetoon animation	
2008
Porgand suvitab	Carrot on the Beach	Pärtel Tall		Puppetoon animation	
Miriami värvid	Miriam´s Colors	Jelena Girlin, Mari Liis Bassovskaja		Puppetoon animation	
Dialogos		Ülo Pikkov		Traditional animation	
Aja meistrid	The Kings of the Time	Mait Laas		Puppetoon animation	
Oranus		Jelena Girlin, Mari Liis Bassovskaja		Puppetoon animation	
Elu ilma Gabriella Ferrita	Life Without Gabriella Ferri	Priit Pärn, Olga Pärn		Traditional animation	
Lily Marlen	Lili	Riho Unt		Puppetoon animation	
Köögi Dimensioonid	Kitchen Dimensions	Priit Tender		Traditional animation	
Kaasasündinud kohustused	Inherent Obligations	Rao Heidmets		Puppetoon animation	
2009
Miriami katkine pilt	Miriam´s Broken Picture	Priit Tender		Puppetoon animation	
Krokodill	Crocodile	Kaspar Jancis		Traditional animation	
Õhus	In the Air	Martinus Daane Klemet		Traditional animation	

=== 2010s ===
Title	English Title	Director	Awards	Genre	Notes
2010
Tuukrid Vihmas	Divers in the Rain	Priit Pärn, Olga Pärn		Traditional animation	
Taevalaul	Sky Song	Mati Kütt		Puppetoon animation	
2011
Prohveti sünd?	Oracle is born…?	Rao Heidmets		Puppetoon animation	
Keha Mälu	Body Memory	Ülo Pikkov		Puppetoon animation	
Lotte ja kuukivi saladus	Lotte and the Moonstone Secret	Heiki Ernits, Janno Põldma		Traditional animation	
Olmeheidutus	Domestic Fitless	Hardi Volmer		Pixilation/Computer animation	
2012
Miriami köögikombain	Miriam´s Food Processor	Andres Tenusaar		Puppetoon animation	
Talvekummitus	The Winter Ghost	Jaana Wahlforss		2D Computer animation	
Kolmnurga afäär	The Triangle Affair	Andres Tenusaar		Puppetoon animation	
Happy Birthday		Riho Unt		Puppetoon animation	
Villa Antropoff		Kaspar Jancis, Vladimir Leschiov		Traditional animation	
Miriami rohelised täpid	Miriam´s Green Spots	Priit Tender		Puppetoon animation	
2013
Miriami tuulelohe	Miriam´s Kite	Riho Unt		Puppetoon animation	
Ussinuumaja	The Maggot Feeder	Priit Tender		Traditional animation	
The End		Ülo Pikkov		Experimental	
Lisa Limone ja Maroc Orange: tormakas armulugu	Lisa Limone and Maroc Orange: A Rapid Love Story	Mait Laas		Puppetoon animation	
Ada + Otto		Ülo Pikkov		Traditional animation	
Limonaadi lugu	Lemonade Tale	Vallo Toomla		Puppetoon animation	
XYZtopia		Martinus Daane Klemet		Traditional animation	
Liivamees	Sandguy	Pärtel Tall		Puppetoon animation	
Suur maalritöö	The Great Painter	Meelis Arulepp, Aina Järvine		Traditional animation	
2014
Must stsenaarium	Worst-Case Scenario	Kristjan Holm		Traditional animation	
Teisel pool metsa	On the Other Side of the Woods	Anu-Laura Tuttelberg		Multimedia	
Lendurid koduteel	Pilots on the Way Home	Priit Pärn, Olga Pärn		Traditional animation	
Papa		Jelena Girlin, Mari Liis Bassovskaja		Multimedia	
Põhjatäht	Northern Starfish	Mattias Mälk		Traditional animation	
2015
Alateadvuse Maja	House of Unconsciousness	Priit Tender		Traditional animation	
Tik-Tak	Tick-Tack	Ülo Pikkov		Pixilation/Puppetoon animation	
Velodrool		Sander Joon		Traditional animation	
Miriami kodutu koer	Miriam´s Stray Dog	Andres Tenusaar		Puppetoon animation	
Isand	The Master	Riho Unt		Puppetoon animation	
Piano		Kaspar Jancis		Traditional animation	
2016
Linnugripp	Bird Flu	Priit Tender		Traditional animation	
Siseilmadest Väljas	Out of Internal Worlds	Helen Unt		Traditional animation	
Miriami kana unistus	Miriam´s Hen´s Dream	Andres Tenusaar		Puppetoon animation	
Täismaja	Full House	Kristjan Holm		Traditional animation	
Fatcula		Martinus Daane Klemet		Traditional animation	
Tühi ruum	Empty Space	Ülo Pikkov		Puppetoon animation	
Igavesed jahimaad	Eternal Hunting Grounds	Elin Grimstad		Cutout animation	
Kalapüüdja Naine ja Karu. Saami Lugu	Fisherwoman and a Bear. A Sami Story	Priit Tender		Traditional animation	
Karu Hindab Pruute. Mansi Lugu	A Bear Judges The Brides. A Mansi Story	Martinus Klemet		Traditional animation	
Karude Tekkimine. Udmurdi Lugu	The Birth of Bears. An Udmurt Story	Mattias Mälk		Traditional animation	
Kolm Savipotti. Komi Lugu	Three Clay Pots. A Komi Story	Kristjan Holm		Traditional animation	
Kuidas Jumal Palus teed Juhatada. Vepsa Lugu	How the God Asked for Directions. A Vepsian Story	Valter Uusberg		Traditional animation	
Kuidas üks piiga kolmele peiule mehele anti. Mari Lugu	How a Girl Was Wed Three Times. A Mari Story	Mattias Mälk		Traditional animation	
Mees ja Naine. Vadja Lugu	A Husband and a Wife. A Voitan Story	Mait Laas		Traditional animation	
Silmadeta Jahimees. Handi Lugu	The Eyeless Hunter. A Khanty Story	Priit Pärn, Olga Pärn		Traditional animation	
Taat ja Memm. Ersa Lugu	An Old Man and an Old Woman. An Erzya Story	Ülo Pikkov		Traditional animation	
2017
Miriam järve ääres	Miriam by the Lake	Riho Unt, Sergei Kibus		Puppetoon animation	
Maria ja 7 Pöialpoissi	Mary and The 7 Dwarfs	Riho Unt		Puppetoon animation	
Moulinet		Sander Joon		Traditional animation	
2018
Hukule Määratud	Destined To Be Dead	Francesco Rosso		Traditional animation	
Kapten Morten lollide laeval	Captain Morten and the Spider Queen	Kaspar Jancis		Puppetoon animation	
Maasikaõgijad	Strawberry Eaters	Mattias Mälk		Traditional animation	
Sounds Good		Sander Joon		Traditional animation	
Teofrastus		Sergei Kibus		Puppetoon animation	
Briljantsuse Demonstratsioon Neljas Vaatuses	A Demonstration of Brilliance in Four Acts	Morten Tšinakov, Lucija Mrzljak		Traditional animation	
2019
Lotte ja kadunud lohed	Lotte and the Lost Dragons	Heiki Ernits, Janno Põldma		Traditional animation	
Talv vihmametsas	Winter in the Rainforest	Anu-Laura Tuttelberg		Puppetoon animation	
Orpheus		Priit Tender		Traditional animation	
Armastusest	About Love	Jelena Girlin, Mari Liis Bassovskaja		Puppetoon animation	
Kosmonaut	Cosmonaut	Kaspar Jancis		Traditional animation	
Vanamehe film	The Old Man	Mikk Mägi, Oskar Lehemaa		Puppetoon animation	
Tiivad	The Wings	Riho Unt		Puppetoon animation	

=== 2020s ===
Title	English Title	Director	Awards	Genre	Notes
2020
Sipsik	Raggie	Meelis Arulepp, Karsten Kiilerich		Computer animation	
Toonekurg	The Stork	Morten Tšinakov, Lucija Mrzljak		Traditional animation	
2021
Neli Kivi	Four Stones	Francesco Rosso		Traditional animation	
Mees nõudmiseni	Man Wanted	Irida Zhonga		Puppetoon animation	
Vigurivänt Volli	Troublemaker Tommy	Rao Heidmets		Multimedia	
Jõe valitseja	Lord of the River	Artur Wyrzykowski		Traditional animation	
Üks imeline mees	A Most Exquisite Man	Jonas Taul		Puppetoon animation	
Taaskohtumine	´ Til We Meet Again	Ülo Pikkov		Puppetoon animation	
2022
Eeva		Morten Tšinakov, Lucija Mrzljak		Traditional animation	
Koerkorter	Dog-Apartment	Priit Tender		Puppetoon animation	
Sierra		Sander Joon		Computer animation	
2023
Operatsioon Larp	Operation Larp	Mattias Mälk		Traditional animation	
Antipolis		Kaspar Jancis		Puppetoon animation	
Väike Teine	The Little Other	Andres Tenusaar		Puppetoon animation	
Porgand – lumehelbe lugu	Carrot – Finding Snowflake	Pärtel Tall		Puppetoon animation	
