= Tõnu Trubetsky =

Estonian musician

- Teet Tibar (left) & Tõnu Trubetsky.

Background information
- Also known as: Tõnu Troubetzkoy, Mycroft Trubecki, Tony Blackplait etc.
- Born: Tõnu Trubetsky; April 24, 1963 (age 63); Tallinn, then part of Estonian SSR, Soviet Union
- Genres: Glam rock, punk rock
- Occupations: Musician; singer-songwriter; film director; writer; actor; impresario
- Instrument: Vocals
- Years active: 1973–present
- Label: Līgo
- Formerly of: The Flowers of Romance, Vürst Trubetsky & J.M.K.E.
- Award

Tõnu Trubetsky or Tõnu Troubetzkoy (born April 24, 1963), also known as Mycroft Trubecki, Tony Blackplait etc., is a writer, impresario, glam rock/punk rock musician, film and music video director, and individualist anarchist.

== Political activity ==
Trubetsky is a former member of the Estonian Greens. He stood as a candidate in the Estonian parliamentary election in 2007 and the European Parliament election in 2009. On June 14, 2019, Tõnu Trubetsky, together with like-minded individuals, founded the Livonian Royalist Party (Līvõmō Rojālistõd Partij). The founding congress took place at Sagnitz Castle.

== Discography ==
=== Vürst Trubetsky and J. M. K. E. ===
1. Rotipüüdja (2000, MC, CD, Melodija/Kaljukotkas)

=== The Flowers of Romance ===
1. Sue Catwoman (2004, CDEP, MFM Records)
2. Sue Catwoman (2004, CD, The Flowers of Romance)
3. Paris (2006, CD, Līgo)

==== Compilation including The Flowers of Romance ====
1. Punk Occupation 12 (2006, CD, Feńka R'n'R/Crazy Rat) – Girl in Black

== Filmography ==
=== As director ===
1. Millennium (1998, VHS, 90 min., Faama Film/Trubetsky Pictures)
2. Ma armastan Ameerikat (2001, VHS, 140 min., DayDream Productions/Trubetsky Pictures)
3. Sügis Ida-Euroopas (2004, 2DVD, 185 min., DayDream/Trubetsky Pictures)
4. New York (2006, DVD, 140 min., Trubetsky Pictures)
5. Pirates of Destiny (2007, DVD, 150 min., Trubetsky Pictures)
6. The Swindle Continues (2012, DVD, 176 min, Trubetsky Pictures)
7. New York Tour (2012, DVD, 120 min, Trubetsky Pictures; not the same as "New York")

=== As actor ===
1. Serenade (dir. Rao Heidmets, 1987)
2. The Sweet Planet (dir. Aarne Ahi, 1987)
3. War (dir. Hardi Volmer & Riho Unt, 1987)
4. Hysteria (dir. Pekka Karjalainen, 1992)
5. Moguchi (music by Vennaskond, dir. Toomas Griin & Jaak Eelmets, 2004)
6. Punklaulupidu (dir. Erle Veber, 2008)

== Bibliography ==
1. Pogo (poetry; 1989) ISBN 5-450-00197-5
2. Inglid ja kangelased (Angels And Heroes; novel; with Anti Pathique; 1992)
3. Anarhia (Anarchy; poetry; 1994) ISBN 9985-55-011-0
4. Daam sinises (Lady in Blue; punk novel; with Anti Pathique; 1994)
5. Mina ja George (Me And George; novel; 1996)
6. Trubetsky (poetry; 2000) ISBN 9985-66-199-0
7. Inglid ja kangelased (Angels And Heroes; novel; with Anti Pathique and Juhan Habicht; 2002) ISBN 9985-9448-1-X
8. Anarhistid. Anarhia agendid. Maailmarevolutsiooni prelüüd. Anarhistliku liikumise ajalugu (The Anarchists: Agents of Anarchy. Prelude of World Revolution: A History of Anarchist Movement; 2003) ISBN 9985-9448-8-7
9. Susi jutud (The Tales of Susi; novel; with Anti Pathique; 2007) ISBN 978-9985-9805-1-4
10. Eesti punk 1976–1990. Anarhia ENSV-s (Estonian punk 1976–1990. Anarchy in The ESSR; with Cat Bloomfield; 2009)
11. Eesti punk 1972–1990. Haaknõela külm helk (Tõnu Trubetsky & Kalev Lehola, 2012, Kunst, ISBN 978-9949-486-28-1 {trükis}, ISBN 978-9949-486-29-8 {epub})
12. «Hukkunud Alpinisti» hotelli müsteerium (Tõnu Trubetsky, Tõnu Trubetsky, Tom Claude Trubetsky, sarjas "Mirabilia", 2013, Līgo, ISBN 978-9949-33-313-4)
13. Vaikne hooaeg. Eesti punk 1990–1999 (Silent Season: The Estonian Punk 1990–1999; Tõnu Trubetsky & Kalev Lehola, 2018, Vaiguviiul, ISBN 978-9949-88-749-1)
14. The True Story of Grand Duchess Olga Nicolaevna: The Murder of the Imperial Family Didn’t Happen (Prince Tõnu Trubetsky, 2026, Līgo, ISBN 978-9916-44-128-2)

== Newspaper articles by him ==
- Viva Suzi Quatro! (an interview with Suzi Quatro). Hommikuleht, February 8, 1993
- Teddy Boys. Delfi, March 13, 2003
- Tony Blackplait: Vilnius, the capital of Lithuania, belonged to Poland as Wilno. Virumaa Teataja, November 27, 2009
- Tõnu Trubetsky: The Estonian band that was born in New York. Õpetajate Leht, 26, October 2015
- Tõnu Trubetsky: Metallica chose the right song, I would have made the same decision myself. Postimees, July 20, 2019
- HISTORY ⟩ The Republic of Estonia was born in the village of Vaali: the 1905 revolutionary attempt. Postimees, September 9, 2023
- Tõnu Trubetsky: Superman: The future of humanity or fantasy?. Postimees, October 21, 2023
- RUSSIAN OCCUPATION ⟩ Carelia wants to secede and become independent. Postimees, November 9, 2023
- Tõnu Trubetsky: Will Ingria be born again in Ukraine?. Maaleht, November 23, 2023
- PRUSSIA 2024 ⟩ Königsberg's separation from Russia can give birth to a fourth Baltic country. Postimees, November 27, 2023
- Kiss 50: The timeless echo of Glam Rock. Neanky, December 8, 2023
- THE KINGDOM OF SIBERIA ⟩ Moscow's weakening central power gives Siberia a chance to become independent. Postimees, December 12, 2023
- 50 YEARS OF KISS ⟩ Tõnu Trubetsky looks back at the glam rock giant. Postimees, December 15, 2023
- PARTISAN MOVEMENT ⟩ An anti-war sentiment has emerged in Russia and Belarus. Postimees, December 30, 2023
- Tõnu Trubetsky: The Russian language is not an obstacle to the decolonization of Carelia, changes must start with the economy. Maaleht, January 27, 2024
- TÕNU TRUBETSKY ⟩ Could we use fist and foot again?. Postimees, February 11, 2024
- TÕNU TRUBETSKY ⟩ We declare cats sacred animals in Estonia!. Postimees, August 4, 2024
- TÕNU TRUBETSKY ⟩ DA – a band that will not be forgotten: Urmas Alender and Ricky Delin. Postimees, October 19, 2024
- Tõnu Trubetsky ⟩ An unexplained secret is hidden at the bottom of the Baltic Sea. Postimees, February 23, 2025
- HISTORY ⟩ The year when the manors burned and the forest and land were supposed to become ours. Postimees, April 4, 2025
- TÕNU TRUBETSKY ⟩ Merivälja UFO or Object M: a new realistic perspective. Postimees, May 10, 2025
- Tõnu Trubetsky ⟩ How the Duchy of Estonia was created. Postimees, May 24, 2025
- TÕNU TRUBETSKY ⟩ The independent Duchy of Ösel (Saaremaa) – a short-lived European monarchy in the shadow of the First World War. Postimees, June 7, 2025
- TÕNU TRUBETSKY ⟩ How did Napoleon liberate the Grand Duchy of Lithuania in 1812? Postimees, May 10, 2026
- TÕNU TRUBETSKY ⟩ Vienna 1913 – when Zweig, Hitler, Trotsky, Tito, Freud, Ramus, Stalin, and Tuglas lived in the same city. Postimees, June 7, 2026
- TÕNU TRUBETSKY ⟩ MS Estonia: the saved, the lost, and the final question—sometimes silence speaks volumes. The phone rings, no one speaks.... Postimees, September 28, 2026

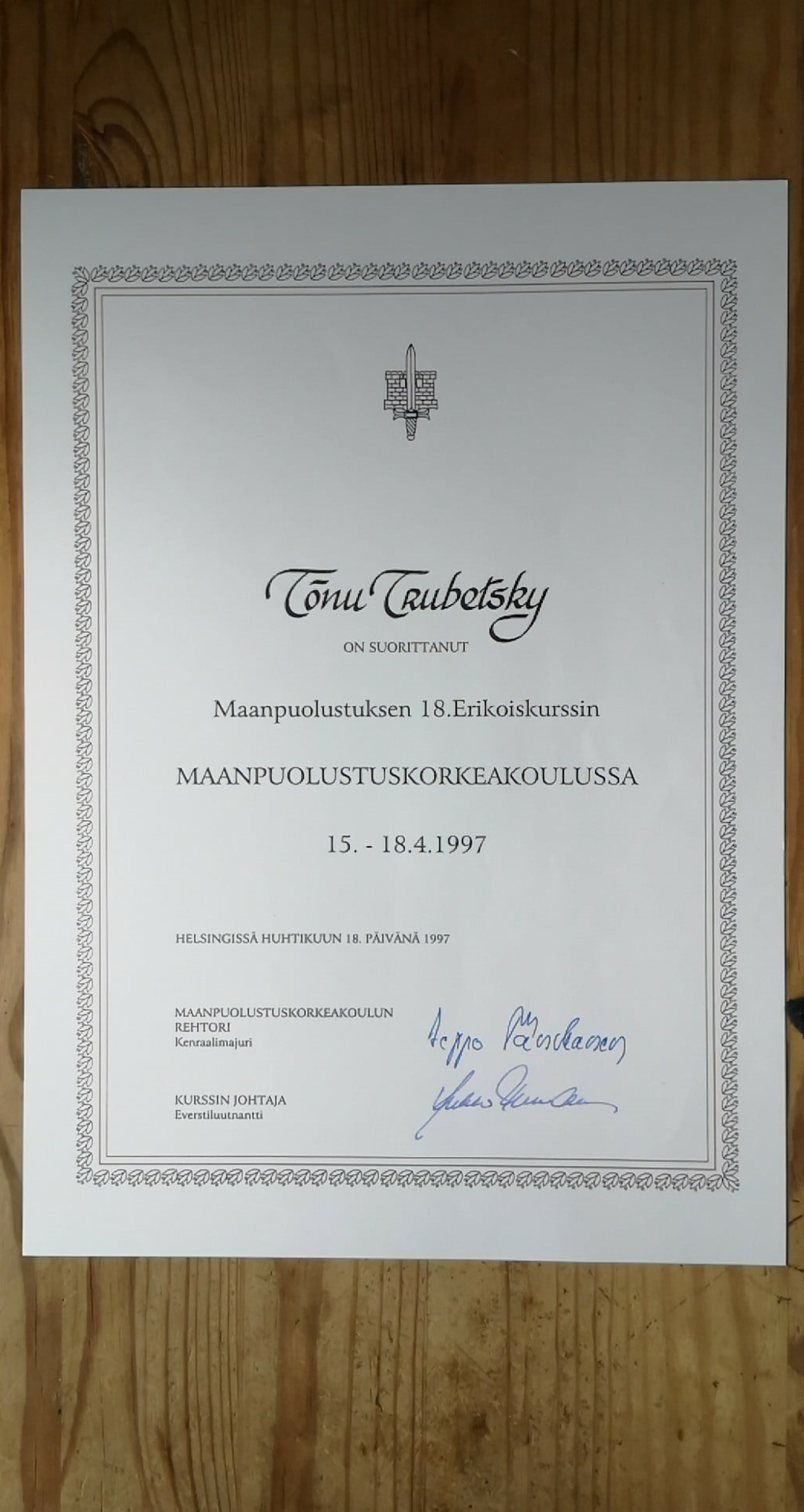
Tõnu Trubetsky's Graduation Certificate. April 18, 1997.
