= List of animated feature films of 2000 =

This is a list of animated feature films first released in 2000.

== List ==
Title	Country	Director	Production company	Animation technique	Type	Notes	Release date	Duration
The Adventures of Rocky and Bullwinkle	United States	Des McAnuff	Tribeca Productions; Capella Films	Traditional / Computer / Live action	Theatrical; Live action		June 30, 2000	92 minutes
Ah! My Goddess: The Movie 劇場版「ああっ女神さまっ」 (Gekijōban "Aa! Megami-sama!")	Japan	Hiroaki Gōda	AIC	Traditional	Theatrical		October 21, 2000	105 minutes
Aladdin and the Adventure of All Time	United States; Philippines	Cirio H. Santiago	Premiere Entertainment Productions; New Horizons Home Video	Traditional	Direct-to-video		June 13, 2000	81 minutes
Alpamysh; Алпамыш	Uzbekistan	Nazim Tulyakhodgaev		Traditional		First Uzbekistan animated feature.		54 minutes
Go! Anpanman: The Tears of the Mermaid Princess それいけ!アンパンマン 人魚姫のなみだ	Japan	Akinori Nagaoka	Anpanman Production Committee; TMS Entertainment	Traditional			July 29, 2000	55 minutes
Alvin and the Chipmunks Meet the Wolfman	United States	Kathi Castillo	Bagdasarian Productions LLC. Universal Cartoon Studios	Traditional	Direct-to-video		August 29, 2000	77 minutes
Amon: Apocalypse of Devilman	Japan	Kenichi Takeshita	Studio Live	Traditional	Direct-to-video	First direct-to-video installment in the Devilman franchise since the 1987 and 1990 OVAs.	May 24, 2000	45 minutes
Animal War (Zverinye voiny)	Russia Ukraine; United States	Yuriy Stytskovskiy; Yuri Volodarsky	Volodarsky Brothers; Odesa Animation Studio; Wildbrain Entertainment	Traditional	Direct-to-video		January 1, 2000	74 minutes
Arthur's Perfect Christmas							November 23, 2000	60 minutes
Batman Beyond: Return of the Joker	United States	Curt Geda	Warner Bros. Family Entertainment; Warner Bros. Animation	Traditional	Direct-to-video		December 12, 2000 (edited version); April 23, 2002 (uncut version)	73 minutes (edited version); 76 minutes (uncut version)
Beauty and Warrior; Dewi Mayang Sari	Indonesia	Sukma Romadhon	Wissta Animation Film	Traditional		Was adapted into English by IFD Films and Arts in 2002	December 21, 2000	41 minutes
Blood: The Last Vampire	Japan	Hiroyuki Kitakubo	Production I.G; IG Plus	Traditional			November 18, 2000	48 minutes
The Boy Who Saw the Wind 風を見た少年 (Kaze o mita shōnen)	Japan	Kazuki Omori	Brain's Base; Hitachi-Maxell	Traditional			July 22, 2000	97 minutes
Buzz Lightyear of Star Command: The Adventure Begins	United States	Tad Stones	Walt Disney Television Animation; Pixar Animation Studios	Traditional / Computer	Direct-to-video		August 8, 2000	70 minutes
Cardcaptor Sakura Movie 2: The Sealed Card 劇場版カードキャプターさくら 封印されたカード (Gekijōban Kādokyaputā Sakura Fūin Sareta Kādo)	Japan	Morio Asaka	Madhouse	Traditional	Theatrical		July 15, 2000	80 minutes
Case Closed: Captured in Her Eyes 名探偵コナン 瞳の中の暗殺者 (Meitantei Conan: Hitomi no Naka no Ansatsusha)	Japan	Kenji Kodama	TMS Entertainment; Toho	Traditional	Theatrical		April 22, 2000	95 minutes
Casper's Haunted Christmas	Canada	Owen Hurley	The Harvey Entertainment Company; Mainframe Entertainment	Computer	Direct-to-video		October 31, 2000	86 minutes
Chicken Run	United Kingdom; United States; France	Peter Lord; Nick Park	Aardman Animations; DreamWorks Animation; Pathé	Stop-motion	The first feature film production from Aardman Animation, and the highest-grossing stop-motion animated feature of all time.		June 23, 2000 (United States); June 30, 2000 (United Kingdom)	84 minutes
Circleen: Mice and Romance; Cirkeline 2: Ost og Kærlighed	Denmark			Traditional			February 11, 2000	60 minutes
Condor Crux, the Legend; Cóndor Crux, la leyenda	Spain; Argentina	Juan Pablo Buscarini; Swan Glecer	Patagonik Film Group; Tornasol Films S.A.	Traditional / Computer			January 6, 2000	88 minutes
Crayon Shin-chan: Rumble in the Jungle	Japan	Keiichi Hara	Shin-Ei Animation	Traditional	Theatrical		April 22, 2000	88 minutes
CyberWorld	United States	Colin Davies; Elaine Despins	Intel; EyeTide Media; ZeoCast; IMAX Sandde Animation; Spin Entertainment	Computer	Theatrical	IMAX anthology	October 6, 2000	44 minutes
Digimon: The Movie	Japan; United States	Mamoru Hosoda; Shigeyasu Yamauchi	Fox Kids; Toei Animation; Saban Entertainment	Traditional	Theatrical; Compilation film		October 6, 2000	88 minutes
Dinosaur	United States	Ralph Zondag; Eric Leighton	Walt Disney Feature Animation; The Secret Lab; Spikes Up	Computer / Live action	Theatrical; Live action animated film	The first computer-animated feature film from Disney Animation overall; only the characters are all CGI and the backgrounds were filmed in live-action.	May 19, 2000	82 minutes
Doraemon: Nobita and the Legend of the Sun King ドラえもん のび太の太陽王伝説 (Doraemon Nobita no Taiyōō Densetsu)	Japan	Tsutomu Shibayama	Shin-Ei Animation	Traditional	Theatrical		March 4, 2000	93 minutes
Duck Ugly	Ireland	Emmanuel Klotz; Deane Taylor	Millimages; TerraGlyph Productions	Traditional			2000	65 minutes
The Emperor's New Groove	United States	Mark Dindal	Walt Disney Feature Animation	Traditional	Theatrical		December 10, 2000	78 minutes
Escaflowne	Japan	Kazuki Akane	Bones; Sunrise	Traditional			June 24, 2000	98 minutes
An Extremely Goofy Movie	United States; Singapore; Australia	Ian Harrowell; Douglas McCarthy	Walt Disney Television Animation	Traditional	Direct-to-video		February 29, 2000	79 minutes
The Four Seasons; A négy évszak	Hungary	Ferenc Cakó	C.A.K.Ó. Stúdió; ORTT; Duna TV	Stop motion / Sand	Television film		2000	43 minutes
Franklin and the Green Knight	Canada	John van Bruggen	Nelvana	Traditional	Direct-to-video		October 17, 2000	75 minutes
The Great Easter Egg Hunt	United States	Diane Eskenazi	Golden Films	Traditional	Direct-to-video		March 11, 2000	47 minutes
Heart, the Joys of Pantriste; Corazón, las alegrias de Pantriste	Argentina	Manuel Garcia Ferré		Traditional			July 6, 2000	80 minutes
Heavy Metal 2000	Canada; Germany	Michael Coldewey; Michel Lemire	CinéGroupe	Traditional	Direct-to-video		July 10, 2000	88 minutes
Help! I'm a Fish	Germany; Ireland; Denmark	Stefan Fjeldmark; Michael Hegner; Greg Manwaring	A. Film APS; Egmont Imagination; Munich Animation GmbH; Kinowelt Medien AG; EIV Entertainment Filmproduktion; TerraGlyph Rights Limited; TV2 Denmark; Eurimages	Traditional	Theatrical		October 6, 2000	82 minutes
Hundhotellet	Sweden; Norway; Denmark	Per Åhlin	Zentropa Entertainments	Traditional			March 10, 2000	68 minutes
Is It Fall Yet?	United States; South Korea	Karen Disher; Guy Moore	MTV Animation	Traditional	Television film		August 27, 2000	75 minutes
The Island of the Crab; La Isla del cangrejo	Spain	Txavi Basterretxea; Joxan Muñoz		Traditional			October 2, 2000	64 minutes
Jesus: A Kingdom Without Frontiers	Italy	Jung Soo Yong	Mondo TV	Traditional			2000	89 minutes
Joseph: King of Dreams	United States	Rob LaDuca; Robert C. Ramirez	DreamWorks Animation	Traditional	Direct-to-video	Prequel to The Prince of Egypt (1998).	November 7, 2000	74 minutes
Kadir's Happiness; Сначале Кадыра (Schastye Kadira)	Kazakhstan	Kaldybai Seidanov; Victor Chugunov	Kazakhfilm	Traditional	Theatrical	"Schastye Kadira'"	2000	55 minutes
The Land Before Time VII: The Stone of Cold Fire	United States	Charles Grosvenor	Universal Cartoon Studios	Traditional	Direct-to-video	Seventh installment in The Land Before Time film series and the first installment to use digital ink and paint animation.	December 5, 2000	74 minutes
The Last Mystery of the 20th Century 手塚治虫が消えた!? 20世紀最後の怪事件 (Tezuka Osamu ga Kieta?! 20 Seiki Saigo no Kaijiken)	Japan	Satoshi Kuwabara	Tezuka Productions; TV Asahi	Traditional	Television special		December 5, 2000	42 minutes
Leif Erickson, Discoverer of North America	United States			Traditional			June 23, 2000 (United Kingdom); July 14, 2000 (United States)	85 minutes
The Life & Adventures of Santa Claus	United States	Glen Hill	Mike Young Productions	Traditional	Direct-to-video		October 31, 2000	75 minutes
Lion of Oz	Canada; United Kingdom	Tim Deacon	CinéGroupe	Traditional	Direct-to-video		August 25, 2000	74 minutes
Lupin III: Missed by a Dollar ルパン三世『1＄マネーウォーズ』 (Rupan Sansei: 1 Doru Manē Wōzu)	Japan	Hideki Tonokatsu	Tokyo Movie Shinsha; Nippon TV	Traditional	Television special		July 28, 2000	91 minutes
The Little Mermaid II: Return to the Sea	United States	Jim Kammerud; Brian Smith	DisneyToon Studios	Traditional	Direct-to-video		September 19, 2000	75 minutes
Lotte's Journey South	Estonia	Heiki Ernits; Janno Põldma	Eesti Joonisfilm	Traditional	Direct-to-video		2000	65 minutes
The Magic Pudding	Australia	Karl Zwicky	Energee Entertainment; New South Wales Film and Television Office; Australian Broadcasting Corporation; Premium Movie Partnership		Theatrical		December 14, 2000	80 minutes
Marco Antonio, rescate en Hong Kong	Spain	Manuel J. García; Carlos Varela		Traditional			December 1, 2000	78 minutes
Miracle in Toyland	United States	Diane Eskenazi	Golden Films	Traditional	Direct-to-video		November 14, 2000	47 minutes
The Miracle Maker	Russia; United Kingdom	Derek W. Hayes; Stanislav Sokolov	Icon Entertainment International; Christmas Films; S4C; BBC Films	Stop motion	Theatrical		March 31, 2000	90 minutes
Monster Mash	Italy; United States	Guido Manuli	DIC Entertainment, L.P. RAI Radiotelevisione Italiana; Rai Fiction	Traditional	Direct-to-video		August 29, 2000	64 minutes
The New Bremen Town Musicians; Новые бременские (Novyye bremenskiye)	Russia	Alexander Gorlenko	Kinomost	Traditional			May 24, 2000	56 minutes
Nien Resurrection	Malaysia			Computer	Direct-to-video			
Upside down mountain or a movie with a scary title Odwrócona góra albo film pod strasznym tytułem	Poland	Leszek Gałysz		Traditional			May 26, 2000	77 minutes
One Piece	Japan	Junji Shimizu	Toei Animation	Traditional	Theatrical	First installment in the One Piece film series; the only film in the franchise to use traditional cel animation.	March 4, 2000	51 minutes
One Piece TV Special: Adventure in the Ocean's Navel ワンピース TVスペシャル 海のヘソの大冒険 (Wan Pīsu Terebi Supesharu: Umi no Heso no Daibōken)	Japan	Yukio Kaizawa	Toei Animation; Fuji TV	Traditional	Television special	First installment in the One Piece television special series	December 20, 2000	50 minutes
Optimus Mundus	Russia			Traditional				
Pandavas: The Five Warriors	India	Usha Ganesh Raja	Pentamedia Graphics	Computer		India's first 3D animated film	December 23, 2000	110 minutes
Pettson och Findus – Kattonauten	Sweden	Torbjörn Jansson; Albert Hanan Kaminski; Árpad Szabó	Happy Life Animation AB	Traditional			October 27, 2000	76 minutes
Pokémon: Mewtwo Returns ポケットモンスター ミュウツー! 我ハココニ在リ MEWTWO SAGA (Poketto Monsutā: Myuutsū! Ware wa Koko ni Ari MEWTWO SAGA)	Japan	Kunihiko Yuyama	OLM	Traditional	Television special		December 30, 2000	60 minutes
Pokemon 3: The Movie Entei-Spell of the Unknown 劇場版ポケットモンスター 結晶塔の帝王 ENTEI (Gekijōban Poketto Monsutā Kesshōtō no Teiō Entei)	Japan	Kunihiko Yuyama	OLM, Inc.	Traditional	Theatrical		July 8, 2000	74 minutes
The Prince of Dinosaurs; Il Principe Dei Dinosauri	Italy	Orlando Corradi	Mondo TV	Traditional			2000	79 minutes
Princes and Princesses; Princes et princesses	France	Michel Ocelot	La Fabrique; Les Armateurs; Salud Productions; Studio O	Traditional			January 26, 2000	70 minutes
Prop and Berta; Prop og Berta	Denmark; Latvia	Per Fly		Stop motion			November 27, 2000	77 minutes
Read or Die	Japan	Koji Masunari	Studio Deen	Traditional				
Redwall: The Movie	Canada			Traditional				84 minutes
The Rescue by Pintin; Los Pintín al rescate	Argentina			Traditional			July 13, 2000	82 minutes
The Road to El Dorado	United States	Don Paul; Bibo Bergeron	DreamWorks Animation	Traditional	Theatrical		March 31, 2000	89 minutes
Robin and the Dreamweavers	United States	Kamoon Song	Lou Scheimer Productions; Sunmin Image Pictures Co. (animation) (uncredited)	Traditional	Television film	Failed pilot for a proposed animated television series.		75 minutes
Rugrats in Paris: The Movie	United States	Stig Bergqvist; Paul Demeyer	Nickelodeon Movies; Klasky Csupo	Traditional	Theatrical		November 17, 2000	78 minutes
The Scarecrow	United States	Brian Nissen; Richard Rich	Nest Family Entertainment (Uncredited); Rich Animation Studios	Traditional	Direct-to-video		August 22, 2000	81 minutes
Scooby-Doo and the Alien Invaders	United States	Jim Stenstrum	Hanna-Barbera Cartoons; Warner Bros. Animation	Traditional	Direct-to-video	Final Scooby-Doo film to use traditional cel animation	October 3, 2000	71 minutes
Sinbad: Beyond the Veil of Mists	India; United States	Alan Jacobs; Evan Ricks	Improvision Corporation; Pentafour Software	Computer		First animated feature that uses motion capture.	February 18, 2000	82 minutes
Soreike! Anpanman: Kieta Jam Oji-san それいけ! アンパンマン 消えたジャムおじさん (Let's Go! Anpanman: Uncle Jam Has Disappeared)	Japan	Akinori Nagaoka	TMS Entertainment; Nippon TV	Traditional	Television special		February 21, 2000	50 minutes
Soreike! Anpanman Ningyohime no Namida それいけ! アンパンマン 人魚姫のなみだ (Let's Go! Anpanman: The Tears of the Mermaid Princess)	Japan	Akinori Nagaoka	TMS Entertainment; Media Box; Tokyo Theatres	Traditional	Theatrical		July 29, 2000	55 minutes
Street Fighter Alpha: The Animation Street Fighter Zero (ストリートファイターZERO)	Japan	Shigeyasu Yamauchi	Group TAC	Traditional	Direct-to-video; OVA		August 31, 2000	93 minutes
The Tangerine Bear	United States	Bert Ring	Family Home Entertainment	Traditional	Direct-to-video		November 11, 2000	48 minutes
The Thief of Dreams; El Ladrón de sueños	Spain	Ángel Alonso	Dibulitoon Studio, S.L.	Computer			November 11, 2000	69 minutes 79 minutes (Spain)
Thomas and the Magic Railroad	United States; United Kingdom	Britt Allcroft	Destination Films; Gullane Pictures; Isle of Man Film Commission	Live-action / Stop-motion			July 14, 2000	84 minutes
The Tigger Movie	United States; Japan	Jun Falkenstein	Disneytoon Studios	Traditional	Theatrical		February 11, 2000	78 minutes
Titan A.E.	United States	Don Bluth; Gary Goldman	Fox Animation Studios; 20th Century Fox Animation; David Kirschner Productions; Mutant Enemy	Traditional / Computer	Theatrical	Final production overall from Fox Animation Studios, as the company was closed before its release, and the last feature film directed by Don Bluth.	June 16, 2000	94 minutes
Titanic: The Legend Goes On; Titanic – La leggenda continua	Italy	Kim Lox; Camillo Teti	Titanic Cartoons SRL Roma; Medusa Film	Traditional	Theatrical		September 15, 2000	82 minutes
Tom Sawyer	United States	Paul Sabella	Metro-Goldwyn-Mayer Animation	Traditional	Direct-to-video	Final production overall from Metro-Goldwyn-Mayer Animation, the company went closed after its release.	April 4, 2000	89 minutes
Tweety's High-Flying Adventure	United States	Karl Torege; Charles Visser; James T. Walker	Warner Bros. Animation; Warner Bros. Family Entertainment	Traditional	Direct-to-video	First direct-to-video installment in the Looney Tunes franchise.	September 12, 2000	72 minutes
Vampire Hunter D: Bloodlust 吸血鬼ハンターD ブラッドラスト (Banpaia Hantā Dī: Buraddorasuto)	Japan	Yoshiaki Kawajiri	Madhouse	Traditional	Theatrical		July 2000	102 minutes
VeggieTales: Esther... The Girl Who Became Queen	United States	Mike Nawrocki	Big Idea Productions	Computer	Direct-to-video		September 30, 2000	35 minutes
VeggieTales: King George and the Ducky	United States	Mike Nawrocki	Big Idea Productions	Computer	Direct-to-video		April 1, 2000	36 minutes

== Highest-grossing films ==
The following is a list of the 10 highest-grossing animated feature films first released in 2000.

Rank	Title	Studio	Worldwide gross	Ref.
1	Dinosaur	Walt Disney Feature Animation	$349,822,765	
2	Chicken Run	DreamWorks Animation / Aardman Animations / Pathé	$227,793,915	
3	The Emperor's New Groove	Walt Disney Feature Animation	$169,662,340	
4	Rugrats in Paris: The Movie	Nickelodeon Movies / Klasky Csupo	$103,291,131	
5	The Tigger Movie	DisneyToon Studios	$96,159,800	
6	The Road to El Dorado	DreamWorks Animation	$76,432,727	
7	Pokémon 3: The Movie	OLM, Inc.	$68,411,275	
8	Titan A.E.	Fox Animation Studios / David Kirschner Productions	$36,754,634	
9	Doraemon: Nobita and the Legend of the Sun King	Asatsu	$31,300,000	
10	Digimon: The Movie	Saban Entertainment	$16,600,000	

== See also ==
- List of animated television series of 2000
