= The Adventures of Juku the Dog =

1931 Estonian animated film

Kutsu-Juku seiklusi
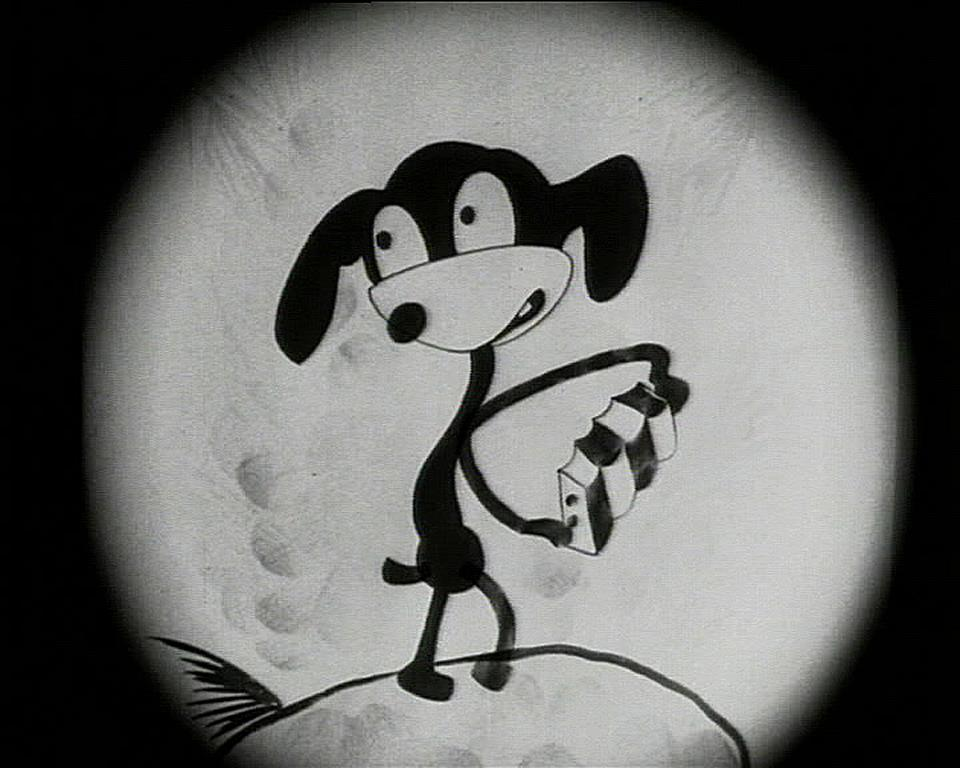
- A scene from the film showing Juku the Dog playing an accordion.
- Directed by: Voldemar Päts
- Written by: Voldemar Päts
- Produced by: Aleksander Teppor
- Cinematography: Aleksander Teppor
- Release date: 30 April 1931
- Running time: 6 minutes (but only 4 minutes have been preserved)
- Country: Estonia
- Languages: Silent (1931), Music and Voiceover (2001, Estonian)

The Adventures of Juku The Dog (Estonian: Kutsu-Juku seiklusi) is a 1931 Estonian experimental animated short film. is the first Estonian animated short film, written and directed by Voldemar Päts, produced by Aleksander Teppor, and with animation by the cartoonist Elmar Jaanimägi. For the film, about 5000 drawings were made. Out of the total of 180 meters (6 minutes) of shot film stock about 100m (4 minutes) have survived. The soundtrack for the silent film was provided by Records of the Tormolen Co. Parlophon. Two films in the series were attempted. The second one, called The Adventures of Juku on Land and Water (Estonian: Juku seiklused maal ja veel), was not completed and has not survived.

== Plot ==
The full short film.

In the first scene of the film, Juku the Dog is running with his legs stretching out. Juku sees a crow-like bird and laughs at it. Juku finds a shotgun. Juku fires a shotgun, two birds are flying toward each other. One bird chokes on the bullet and then it explodes. Then frogs in a river laugh at it. Then a gull-like bird plays a piano. A brief scene shows a skeleton and skull moving slowly. The next scene shows Juku the Dog running, he dances around a tree stump and then Juku the Dog moves his nose to a gramophone. Juku the Dog goes inside to the gramophone, he goes to a place and plays an accordion-like instrument. The final scene shows Juku the Dog emerging from the ground next to a pig on a railroad track.

== Legacy ==
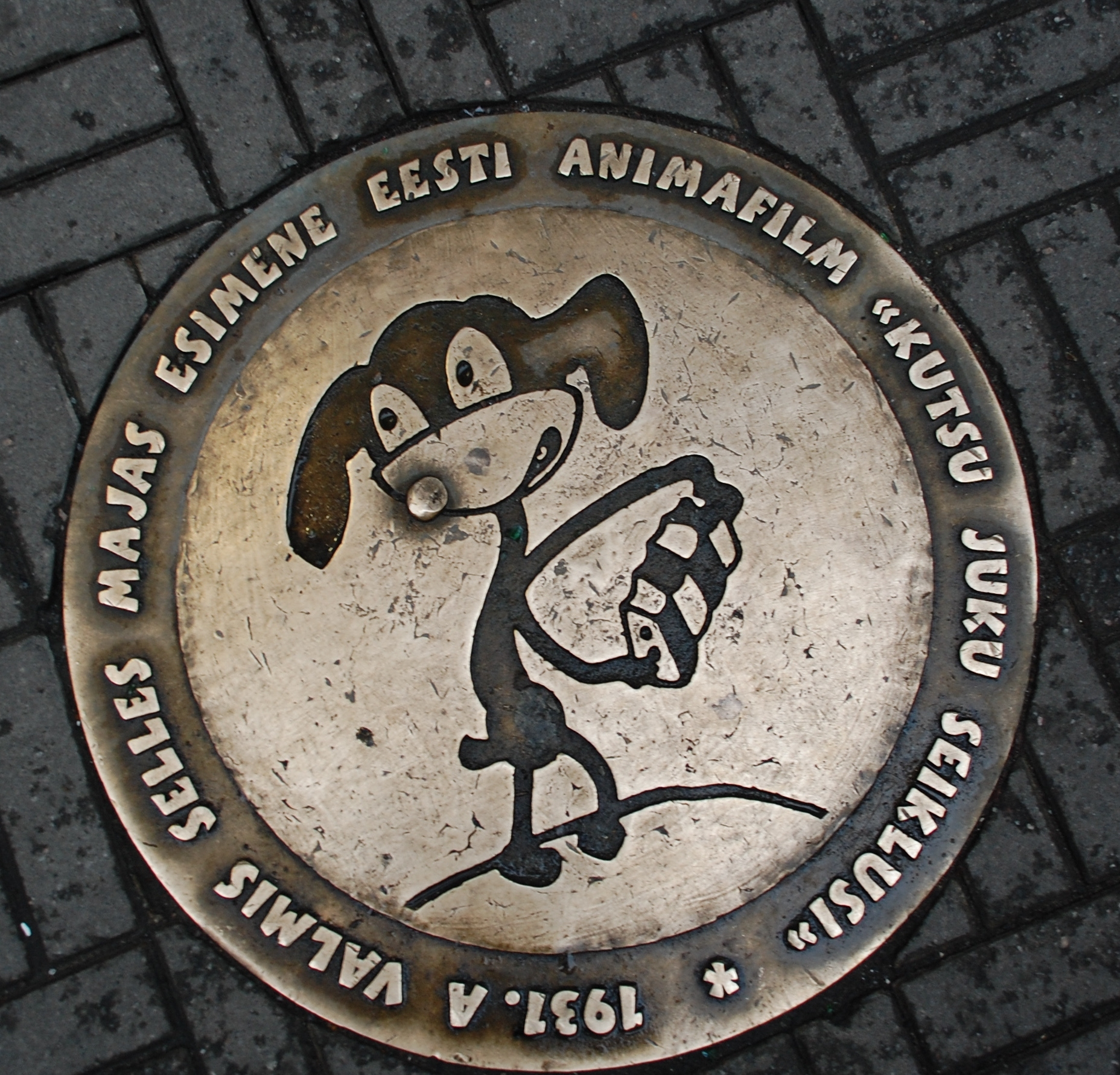
Plaque dedicated to the film's producers, placed on November 30, 2001. The plaque reads "In 1931, the first Estonian animated film The Adventures of Juku the Dog was made in this building". (Note: Estonian: 1931. Aastal a valmis selles majas esimene Eesti animafilm "Kutsu-Juku Seiklusi")

After the Great Depression and World War II hit Estonia, the first professional puppetoon animation studio in Estonia Nukufilm was established by Elbert Tuganov in 1958 and a traditional cel animation studio Joonisfilm by Rein Raamat in 1971. The film was considered lost for many years until it was rediscovered in 1986 inside an archival building. In modern times the most known Estonian Animation Director is Priit Pärn, the winner of Grand Prize at the Ottawa International Animation Festival in 1998.

On November 30, 2001, a commemorative plaque was opened on the sidewalk in front of Aleksander Teppor's original photo studio in Suur-Karja 9, Tallinn. The monument was dedicated to the film's producers for the 70th anniversary of the animation in Estonia. The Estonian Film Foundation released a digitally restored copy of the four-minute film from the "Kutsu-Juku Adventures" preserved in Finland in celebration. The plaque was crafted by Riho Unt and Julia Pihlak.

Juku the Dog is also featured on the logo for the Estonian Animation Association (Estonian: Eesti Animatsiooni Liit).
