= Pilots on the Way Home =

2014 animated film directed by Priit Pärn and Olga Pärn

- Estonian: Lendurid koduteel
- Directed by: Priit Pärn, Olga Pärn
- Produced by: Kalev Tamm, Julie Roy
- Production company: Eesti Joonisfilm
- Release date: 2014
- Running time: 16:05
- Country: Estonia
- Language: Estonian

Pilots on the Way Home (Estonian: Lendurid koduteel) is a 2014 Estonian animated film directed by Priit Pärn and Olga Pärn.

== Plot ==
The film tells the story about three pilots during their journey to the home. The journey is long and hard due to harsh climate conditions. But when the pilots rest in the night, the fantastical and erotic actions take place.

== Awards ==
- 2014: Fredrikstad Animation Festival (Norway), Grand Prix
- 2014: annual award by Cultural Endowment of Estonia (best film of the year)
- 2014: PÖFF: Animated Dreams (Tallinn), best audiodesign (Estonian: parim helikujundus)
