= The Kings of the Time =

2008 animated film directed by Mait Laas

- Directed by: Mait Laas
- Produced by: Anneli Ahven, Arvo Nuu, Mait Laas
- Production companies: Exitfilm, Nukufilm
- Release date: 2008
- Running time: 72 minutes
- Country: Estonia
- Language: Estonian

The Kings of the Time (Estonian: Aja meistrid) is a 2008 Estonian documentary and animated film directed by Mait Laas.

The film is dedicated to Estonian pioneers of animated film: Elbert Tuganov and Heino Pars.

Awards:

- 2008: Eesti Kultuurkapitali Audiovisuaalse kunsti sihtkapitali preemia, best documentary film
- 2008: Asolo Art Film festival (Italy), Premio Asolo for the Best Artist's Biography Film
- 2012: Tampere Film Festival, Estonia Film 100 Years, participation
