= Lotte from Gadgetville =

2006 animated film directed by Heiki Ernits and Janno Põldma

- DVD cover
- Directed by: Heiki Ernits; Janno Põldma
- Written by: Heiki Ernits; Janno Põldma; Andrus Kivirähk
- Starring: Evelin Pang; Andero Ermel; Argo Aadli
- Music by: Sven Grünberg
- Distributed by: Eesti Joonisfilm
- Release dates: May 23, 2006 (Cannes Film Festival); September 1, 2006 (Estonia)
- Running time: 78 minutes
- Country: Estonia
- Language: Estonian

Lotte from Gadgetville (Estonian: Leiutajateküla Lotte, Latvian: Lote no Izgudrotāju ciema) is a 2006 Estonian/Latvian feature-length animated film directed by Heiki Ernits and Janno Põldma.

The film's characters first appeared in Lotte reis lõunamaale (Lotte Goes South), an Estonian animated TV series consisting of 13 five-minute episodes.

In 2007, the film was awarded the Latvian Film Prize for best animated feature film.

In 2011, a sequel was released: Lotte and the Moonstone Secret.

The films and their characters proved so popular in their homeland, that a theme park, Lottemaa (Lotte Village Theme Park), opened in Reiu, Häädemeeste Parish, Estonia.

== Cast ==
Character	Estonian voice actor	English voice actor
Lotte	Evelin Pang	
Bruno	Andero Ermel	
Albert/Theodor	Argo Aadli	
Oskar	Lembit Ulfsak	
Anna	Garmen Tabor	
Mati	Marko Matvere	
Paula	Piret Kalda	
Adalbert	Peeter Oja	
Sophie	Harriet Toompere	
Susumu	Elina Reinold	
Jaak	Mait Malmsten	
Klaus	Margus Tabor	
James	Aarne Üksküla	
John	Peeter Tammearu	
Helmi	Anne Reemann	
Eduard	Ain Lutsepp	
Bruno, chief of jury	Tõnu Kark	
Giovanni	Tõnu Oja	
Julia	Anu Lamp	
Väino/Radio wave	Tiit Sukk	
Judo judge	Roman Baskin	
