= Lotte and the Lost Dragons =

2019 Estonian animated film

- Estonian theatrical release poster
- Directed by: Janno Põldma; Heiki Ernits
- Screenplay by: Janno Põldma; Heiki Ernits; Andrus Kivirähk
- Music by: Sven Grünberg; Renārs Kaupers
- Distributed by: Eesti Joonisfilm
- Release date: 4 January 2019
- Running time: 78 minutes
- Countries: Estonia; Latvia
- Language: Estonian
- Budget: €2,700,000

Lotte and the Lost Dragons (Estonian: Lotte ja kadunud lohed) is a 2019 Estonian-Latvian animated film directed by Janno Põldma and Heiki Ernits (who is also head animator), in a co-production between Joonis Films and Rija Films. It is the fourth film in the Lotte film series (third to be released theatrically), following the titular character.

Funded by the Estonian Film Institute with support from the Creative Europe MEDIA Programme, the film was completed for the 100th Anniversary of the Estonian Republic, and had its world premiere at the 69th Berlin International Film Festival on 6 February 2019. The film stars Evelin Pang as Lotte, with the voices of Helmi Tulev, Mait Malmsten, Elina Reinold and Sepo Seeman.

== Synopsis ==
Lotte gets a little sister named Roosi, and Karl the raccoon and Viktor the fish are scientists who come to Gadgetville, in order to take part in a big folk-song collecting competition. Whoever succeeds in recording the folk song of the world's oldest animal species, the mythical fire-breathing dragon, will win the competition's grand prize. Lotte and Roosi decide to help the scientists win the competition.

== Release ==
The film was released theatrically in Estonia on 2 January 2019, and had its world premiere at the 69th Berlin International Film Festival on 6 February 2019. It was a box office hit in Estonia, receiving 64,000 admissions amounting to a gross of €310,000 within its first month of release.

=== Accolades ===
Lotte and the Lost Dragons was nominated for Best Animated Feature at the 2019 Shanghai International Film Festival.

== Cast ==
Character	Estonian voice actor	English voice actor
Lotte	Evelin Võigemast	
Roosi	Helmi Tulev	
Karl	Mait Malmsten	
Viktor	Elina Reinold	
Adalbert	Sepo Seeman	
Sonja	Anu Lamp	
Giovanni	Andero Ermel	
Adalbert	Peeter Oja	
Giovanni	Andero Ermel	
Ave	Aita Vaher	
Oskar	Karmo Nigula	
Anna	Harriet Toompere	
John	Peeter Tammearu	
James	Rein Oja	
Eduard	Ain Lutsepp	
Tom	Markus Habakukk	
Roberto	Roman Baskin	
Linda	Hana Kivi	
Peeter	Kristjan Laas	
Aksel	Hannes Kaljujärv	
Solveig	Ingrid Noodla	
Lisbet	Triinu Paabut	
Harald	Margus Tabor	
Juta	Ingrid Kivirähk	
Kalmer	Egon Nuter	
Gudrun	Anne Reemann	
Sigrun	Ülle Kaljuste	
Svennur	Tõnu Oja	
Inger	Piret Kalda	
Herman	Mait Joorits	
Hilde	Garmen Tabor	
Manivald	Margus Mikomägi	
