= Breakfast on the Grass =

1997 animated film by Priit Pärn

- Directed by: Priit Pärn
- Written by: Priit Pärn
- Cinematography: Janno Põldma
- Music by: Olav Ehala
- Production company: Tallinnfilm
- Release dates: December 13, 1987 (Estonia); March 2, 1988 (Finland)
- Running time: 25 minutes
- Countries: Estonia; Soviet Union
- Language: Estonian

Breakfast on the Grass (Estonian: Eine murul) is a 1987 Estonian animated short film directed by Priit Pärn.

== Cast ==
- Aarne Üksküla (voice)
- Maria Klenskaja (voice)
- Jüri Krjukov (voice)
- Karl Kalkun (voice)
- Maile Hiiet (voice)

== Awards ==
- 1988: Tampere Film Festival (Finland), Grand Prix
- 1988: ANIMAFEST ZAGREB - World Festival of Animated Film (Croatia), Grand Prix; Best Film in category C; Critics’ Prize
- 1988: CINANIMA - International Animated Film Festival (Espinho, Portugal), Grand Prix
