= Lisa Limone ja Maroc Orange: tormakas armulugu =

2013 animated film

- Estonian: Lisa Limone ja Maroc Orange: tormakas armulugu
- Directed by: Mait Laas
- Screenplay by: Kati Kovács; Peep Pedmanson
- Produced by: Arvo Nuut
- Cinematography: Ragnar Neljandi
- Music by: Ülo Krigul
- Production company: Nukufilm
- Release date: 8 March 2013
- Running time: 72 minutes
- Country: Estonia
- Languages: French, Italian, English, Estonian

Lisa Limone and Maroc Orange: A Rapid Love Story (Estonian: Lisa Limone ja Maroc Orange: tormakas armulugu) is a 2013 Estonian stop motion animated romantic musical film directed by Mait Laas, from a screenplay by Kati Kovács and Peep Pedmanson. Produced by Nukufilm, Ülo Krigul composed the soundtrack. It was released in Estonian cinemas on 8 March 2013.

== Premise ==
Maroc, a singing orange, escapes from North Africa and arrives in Estonian in hope of finding a better homeland. But once arriving he is forced to become a wage slave in a tomato plantation. However, a lemon named Lisa falls in love with him and helps to set him free.

== Voice cast ==
The Estonian voice cast is as follows:

- Omar Nõmm as Maroc the orange
- Iiris Vesik as Lisa Limone the lemon
- Peeter Volkonski as Lisa's dad
- Risto Joost as Clam

== Production ==
According to director Mait Laas, production lasted six years. It took "almost two years to make the puppets and decorations," while filming lasted three years and the sound effects were added a year later. The puppets were moved millimeter at a time.

== Soundtrack ==
The soundtrack was composed by Ülo Krigul. Many of the songs in the film were sung in the native languages of the characters, including French for Maroc and the oranges, Italian for Lisa and the lemons, and English.
