= Tiit Sukk =

Estonian actor, director, and television presenter (born 1974)

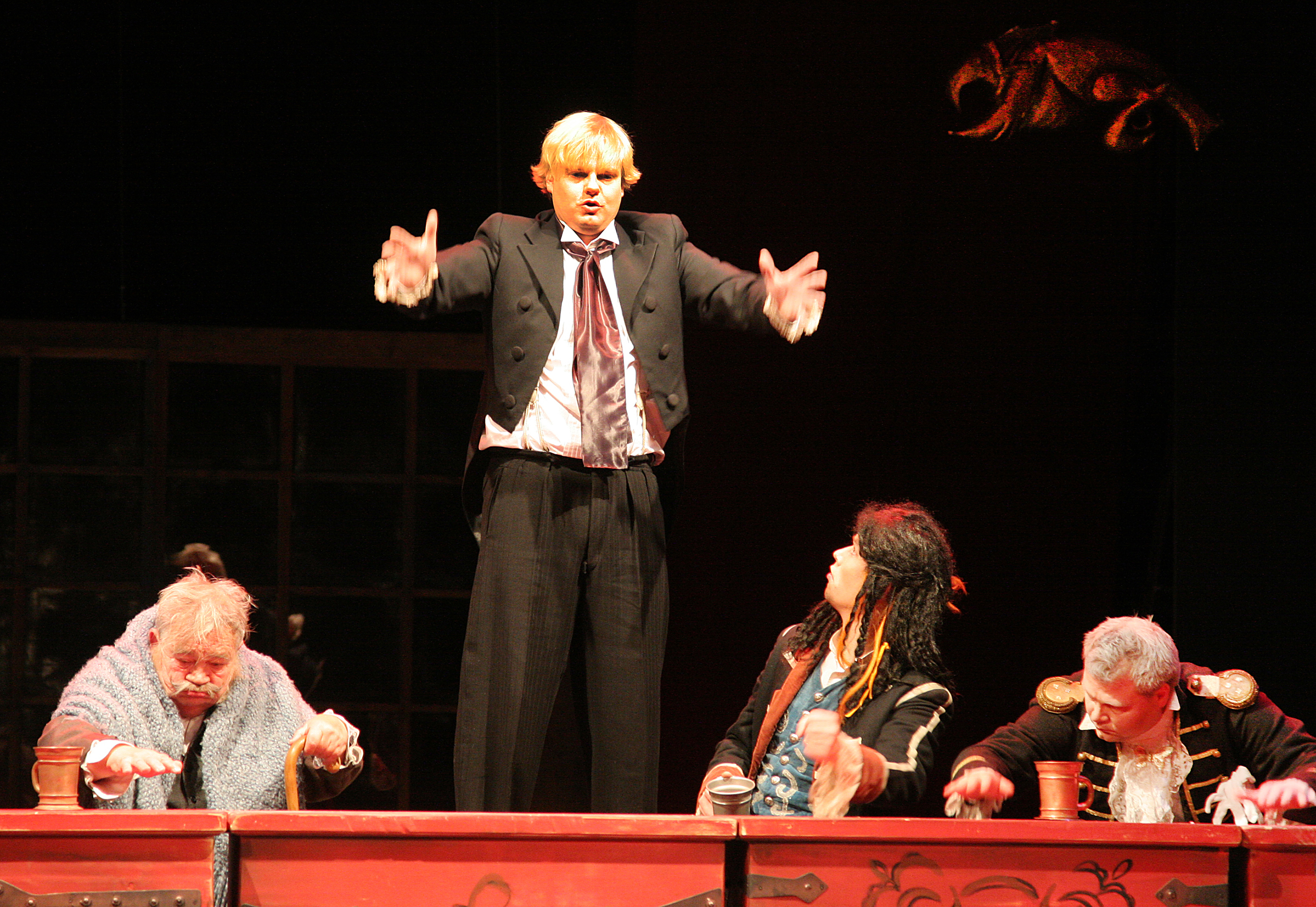
- Sukk in 2007
- Born: 21 November 1974 (age 51); Jõgeva, then part of Estonian SSR, Soviet Union
- Occupations: Actor, director
- Years active: 1996 – present
- Children: 1

Tiit Sukk (born 21 November 1974) is an Estonian stage, television, voice, and film actor, director and television presenter.

== Early life and education ==
Tiit Sukk was born and raised in Jõgeva, Jõgeva County, where he attended primary and secondary schools. He is a 1994 graduate of Jõgeva Gymnasium. Following graduation from secondary school, he studied drama at the EMA Higher Drama School (now, the Estonian Academy of Music and Theatre) in Tallinn, graduating in 1998. Among his graduating classmates were Jan Uuspõld, Harriet Toompere, Veikko Täär, Hilje Murel, Liina Vahtrik, and Andero Ermel.

== Career ==
=== Stage ===
In 1998, shortly after graduation from the EMA Higher Drama School, Sukk began an engagement at the Estonian Drama Theatre in Tallinn, where he is still currently employed. During his career at the Estonian Drama Theatre, Sukk has appeared in over sixty roles in productions of such varied authors and playwrights as: Shakespeare, Frederick Loewe, Charles Dickens, Anton Chekhov, Ödön von Horváth, Brian Friel, Astrid Lindgren, Hanoch Levin, Michael Cooney, Selma Lagerlöf, Martin McDonagh, Roland Schimmelpfennig, Neil Simon, Eugene O'Neill, Wilkie Collins, Halldór Laxness, Enda Walsh, Tom Stoppard, Simon Gray, Jean Anouilh, and Antti Tuuri. Memorable roles in works by Estonian authors and playwrights include those of: Andrus Kivirähk, Madis Kõiv, A. H. Tammsaare, Toomas Kall, Oskar Luts, Voldemar Panso, and Indrek Hargla.

In addition to his roles at the Estonian Drama Theatre, Sukk has also appeared in stage roles as an actor in productions at the Tartu Theatre Lab, the Vanalinnastuudio, and the MTÜ R.A.A.A.M.

=== Film ===
Sukk made his feature film debut as Arnold in the 2001 Peeter Simm-directed joint Estonian-Latvian comedy Head käed. This was followed by an uncredited role in the Kaaren Kaer-directed 2005 comedy Malev; a skewed interpretation of Estonia's history set in the year 1208. In 2006, he had a small role as Director in the Jüri Sillart-directed melodrama Kuldrannake, which was adapted from the Hans Luik play Tõe hetk. The following year, he appeared in the small role of Hunt's Partner in the Asko Kase-directed Hundi agoonia. In 2008, he appeared as Indrek in the Asko Kase-directed period drama Detsembrikuumus, set during the 1924 Estonian coup d'état attempt.

In 2011, Sukk played the role of Guardian Angel in the Andres Kõpper and Arun Tamm-directed comedy-thriller Vasaku jala reede for Tallinn Skyline Productions. In 2016, Sukk played the role of Priit in the Mart Kivastik-directed comedy-drama Õnn tuleb magades, starring Katariina Unt and Ivo Uukkivi. In 2023, he appeared in the role of Peta in the Mart Kivastik-penned and directed comedy feature film Taevatrepp.

In 2026, he appeared as Tiit in German Golub directed biographical sports drama Our Erika, which chronicled the career of Estonian track bicycle racer Erika Salumäe.

Sukk has also appeared in a number of short films throughout his career.

=== Voice ===
Sukk has also worked as a voice actor in several films; including the popular animated Estonian Lotte films Leiutajateküla Lotte in 2006, and Lotte ja kuukivi saladus in 2011. In 2007, he also provided his voice for the Hardi Volmer directed animated short Lõpuõhtu. Sukk has also provided voice dubbing for foreign animated films, including Donkey in the American DreamWorks Animation Shrek films and Joakim in the 2013 Walt Disney Animation Studios musical fantasy film Frozen.

In 2008, Sukk provided his voice for the audiobook version of Andrus Kivirähk's 2007 novel Mees, kes teadis ussisõnu.

=== Television ===
Sukk made his television debut in 1997 as Rando on three episodes of the popular, long-running Eesti Televisioon (ETV) drama series Õnne 13. This was followed in 2003 with an appearance on the Hardi Volmer-directed ETV political satire series Pehmed ja karvased, which was partially inspired by the Russian television series Kukly in its use of puppets to lampoon political figures.

Sukk would go on to appear in numerous television roles. His most substantial roles on television include a starring role as Mati Tilbi/Mati Talvik in the 2005 Jaak Kilmi-directed ETV science fiction comedy television film Kohtumine tundmatuga; a role in the 2006 TV3 teleplay Säärane mulk ehk Sada vakka tangusoola, based on the play of the same name by poet Lydia Koidula; as Paavo Kadak from 2010 until 2012 in thirty-one episodes of the ETV comedy series ENSV: Eesti Nõukogude Sotsialistlik Vabariik, a humorous reflection on life in the Estonian Soviet Socialist Republic, set in the early 1980s (Sukk also directed sixteen episodes of the series); as Kalev on the Kanal 2 comedy series Mägede varjud in 2013; and as Niklas Holm in the Kanal 2 crime series Viimane võmm in 2015.

Other small appearances on serial television include the ETV crime drama Ohtlik lend in 2006; the Kanal 2 crime drama Kelgukoerad in 2008; one episode of the ETV period drama mini-series Tuulepealne maa in 2008; two episodes of the popular TV3 crime-comedy Kättemaksukontor in 2009; a 2010 episode of the ETV mini-series Klass - Elu pärast, which was a follow-up on the 2007 Ilmar Raag directed feature film drama Klass about high school bullying which resulted in a school shooting; the TV3 drama Elu keset linna in 2012; and the ETV drama Mustad lesed in 2015.

In addition to acting, Sukk has worked as a television presenter. In 2004, he hosted the ETV reality comedy series Kuldsuu. In 2012, he was a co-presenter for the finale of Eesti laul; Estonia's televised contest to choose an entry for the Eurovision Song Contest. In 2016, he hosted the Kanal 2 comedy series Suur Komöödiaõhtu, in which Estonian celebrities perform weekly challenges in comedic sketches, musical numbers, fake news stories, and improvised parodies.

== Automobile accident ==
On New Year's Day 2003, at approximately 2:30 am, Sukk was traveling in the back seat of his recently purchased Audi 80 on the Puurmani-Tabivere road in Jõgeva County. His friend, 26-year-old Lauri Kreegipuu, a design analyst for the Estonian Ministry of Justice, was driving, and 26-year-old Triin Voorel, a literary editor at the Estonian Puppet Theatre (NUKU) in Tallinn, was in the front passenger seat. Kreegipuu was driving at a high speed near Kaave bridge in Pajusi Parish while turning a corner and the car skidded out of control on the ice and crashed into a tree. Kreegipuu and Voorel were killed instantly, while Sukk suffered serious, but not life-threatening injuries. It was later determined by police authorities that both Kreegipuu and Sukk were intoxicated, though Voorel was not. Sukk had no memory of the accident and only recalled waking in the hospital.

Sukk spent seven weeks in the hospital recovering from his injuries and had to undergo further rehabilitation to regain the ability to walk.

== Personal life ==
Sukk is in a long-term relationship with secondary school science teacher Eliis-Beth Rosen. The couple have a daughter, Lisanne, and currently reside in Tallinn.
