= Lotte and the Moonstone Secret =

2011 film

- Theatrical release poster
- Directed by: Heiki Ernits; Janno Põldma
- Written by: Heiki Ernits; Janno Põldma; Andrus Kivirähk
- Produced by: Riina Sildos; Kalev Tamm
- Starring: Evelin Pang
- Distributed by: Eesti Joonisfilm
- Release date: 25 August 2011
- Running time: 76 minutes
- Country: Estonia
- Language: Estonian
- Box office: $1.1 million

Lotte and the Moonstone Secret (Estonian: Lotte ja kuukivi saladus) is a 2011 Estonian animated film directed by Heiki Ernits and Janno Põldma. It is the third installment in the Lotte film series.

The film's characters first appeared in Lotte's Journey South (Estonian: Lotte reis lõunamaale), an Estonian animated TV series, containing 13 five-minute episodes. In 2006, the animated feature film Lotte from Gadgetville was released.

== Cast ==
Character	Estonian voice actor	English voice actor
Lotte	Evelin Pang	
Klaus	Margus Tabor	
Jaak the Fly	Mait Malmsten	
Tik the Moon Rabbit	Mikk Jürjens	
Rihv the Moon Rabbit	Tõnu Oja	
Fred the Dog / Lotte's Father Oskar	Lembit Ulfsak	
Paul the Cat	Priit Võigemast	
Voldemar the Pig	Tiit Sukk	
Benita the Cow	Merle Palmiste	
Lotte's Mother Anna / Giraffe in Dream	Garmen Tabor	
Ernst the Spider / Uno the Tiny Illness Man	Elina Reinold	
Ville the Dog	Tõnu Kark	
Matilda the Cat	Anne Reemann	
Parrot	Anu Lamp	
Leo the Seal / Hannes the Snow Lion	Hannes Kaljujärv	
Tuhh the Moon Rabbit	Veiko Tubin	
