= 1895 (1995 film) =

1995 animated film by Priit Pärn and Janno Põldma

- Directed by: Priit Pärn; Janno Põldma
- Produced by: Kalev Tamm; Eeva-Kaisa Nojonen; Juha Vakkuri; Linda Sade; Jüri Škubel
- Production company: Eesti Joonisfilm
- Release date: 1995
- Running time: 30 minutes
- Country: Estonia
- Language: Estonian

1895 is a 1995 Estonian animated film directed by Priit Pärn and Janno Põldma.

== Summary ==
The film is dedicated to the 100th anniversary of cinema. The film speaks about brothers Auguste and Louis Lumière, presenting new facts and events. It also spoofs cinema's impact on perceptions of history, identity and nationality filled with cinematic references, cultural stereotypes and inside jokes.

== Awards ==
- 1995: Estonian State Cultural Award
- 1995: CINANIMA - International Animated Film Festival (Espinho, Portugal), C-category award by the jury
- 1996: Oslo Animation Festival, Best Film
- 1996: ANIMAFEST ZAGREB - World Festival of Animated Film (Croatia), Grand Prix
