= Isand =

2015 animated film directed by Riho Unt

- Directed by: Riho Unt
- Produced by: Kerdi Oengo; Andrus Raudsalu
- Production company: Nukufilm
- Release date: 2015
- Running time: 18 minutes
- Country: Estonia
- Language: Estonian

Isand (English: The Master) is a 2015 Estonian animated film directed by Riho Unt and based on the 1914 short story Popi and Huhuu by Friedebert Tuglas.

== Awards ==
- 2015: Annecy International Animation Film Festival (France), the jury Grand Prix
- 2016: annual award by Cultural Endowment of Estonia (best film of the year)
- 2016: Estonian Film Journalists' Association's award: Neitsi Maali award (best film of the year)
