= Mont Blanc (film) =

2001 animated film directed by Priit Tender

- Directed by: Priit Tender
- Produced by: Kalev Tamm
- Production company: Eesti Joonisfilm
- Release date: 2001
- Running time: 11 minutes
- Country: Estonia
- Language: Estonian

Mont Blanc is a 2001 Estonian animated film directed by Priit Tender.

Awards:

- 2002: Estonian Film Journalists' Association's award: Neitsi Maali award (best film of the year)
- 2002: Holland Animation Film Festival (Utrecht, Holland), AnyZone category prize
- 2002: Filmfest Dresden International Short Film Festival (Germany), 2002, 2nd prize in animated film category

== Cast ==
- Mari Mägi - women
- Lembit Peterson - text reader
- Frank Boyle - narrator
