= Captain Morten and the Spider Queen =

2018 Estonian stop-motion film

- Theatrical release poster
- Estonian: Kapten Morten lollide laeval
- Directed by: Kaspar Jancis
- Cinematography: Ragnar Neljandi
- Edited by: Keith Garvey
- Music by: Pierre Yves Drapeau
- Production companies: Nukufilm; Telegael; Grid VFX; Calon
- Release dates: 5 June 2018 (Animafest Zagreb); 21 March 2019
- Running time: 79 minutes
- Countries: Estonia; Ireland; United Kingdom; Belgium
- Language: English
- Budget: $11,300,000

Captain Morten and the Spider Queen (Estonian: Kapten Morten lollide laeval) is a 2018 Estonian English-language stop motion animated film directed by Kaspar Jancis and co-directed by Riho Unt and Henry Nicholson, from a screenplay by Jancis, Mike Horelick, Paul Risacher, Robin Lyons and Andrew Offiler. An international co-production between the Estonian Nukufilm, Irish Telegael, Belgian Grid VFX and British Calon, the film had its world premiere at the Animafest Zagreb in Croatia on 5 June 2018, before being released in Estonian cinemas on 21 March 2019.

== Premise ==
Ten-year-old Morten lives with his reluctant, mean-spirited guardian, Anna, as his father, Captain Viks, is away at sea. One day, Morten has a chance meeting with the inept magician Senór Cucaracha, and is accidentally magically shrunken down to the size of an insect and trapped aboard the deck of his own toy ship, alongside a wicked Spider Queen and Scorpion Pirate.

== Release and reception ==
The film had its world premiere at the Animafest Zagreb in Croatia on 5 June 2018, before being released in Estonian cinemas on 21 March 2019. It was the only Estonian animated film to be released in 2018.

Vladan Petković of Cineuropa gave the film a positive review and praised its puppet animation and character design, but criticised the number of characters and lack of character development. Vassilis Kroustallis, writing for Zippy Frames, gave the film a positive review, giving particular praise to the puppet animation and plot, calling it "a film easy to like and harder to cherish."

=== Accolades ===
Award	Date	Category	Recipient(s)	Result	Ref
Emile Awards	8 December 2018	Best Direction in a Feature Film; Best Character Design in a Feature Film	Kaspar Jancis, Riho Unt and Henry Nicholson; Mart Kivi and Sam Turner	Nominated	
