= Time Out (1984 film) =

1984 film directed by Priit Pärn

- Directed by: Priit Pärn
- Screenplay by: Priit Pärn
- Cinematography: Janno Põldma
- Edited by: Olev Remsu
- Music by: Olav Ehala
- Distributed by: Tallinnfilm
- Release dates: May 20, 1985 (Estonia); November 11, 1985 (CINANIMA festival, Portugal); March 1987 (Finland)
- Running time: 9 minutes
- Countries: Estonia; Soviet Union
- Language: Estonian

Time Out (original title Aeg Maha) is a 1984 Estonian animated short film. It was directed by Priit Pärn and produced by Tallinnfilm.

== Plot ==
The film is about a cat who loses his time, trying to do many things simultaneously and fails at everything. After that, time breaks apart, and he travels to the world of the infinite absurd. In the end, all returns to its place and problems.

== Reception ==
The film was given a 1985 Varna World Animation Film Festival award.
