= Mai Murdmaa =

Estonian choreographer, ballet dancer and ballet director (1938–2026)

Mai-Ester Murdmaa (31 March 1938 – 24 March 2026) was an Estonian choreographer, ballet dancer, ballet mistress and director.

== Life and career ==
Murdmaa was born in Tallinn on 31 March 1938. Her older brother Ivar Murdmaa is a marine geologist and her younger brother Allan Murdmaa was an architect. Her sister Kai Murdmaa is a physicist.

In 1956 she graduated from the Tallinn Ballet School. In 1964 she graduated from GITIS in ballet master speciality. From 1956 until 1960, she was a dancer at the Estonia Theatre, after that, she was the ballet master (1964–1973) and principal ballet master (1974–2001) at the Estonia Theatre.

Murdmaa was married to Latvian pianist and music professor Valdis Jancis until his death in 2014. Their sons are composer and musician Rainer Jancis and animator and musician Kaspar Jancis. She died on 24 March 2026, at the age of 87.

== Awards ==
- 2001: Order of the White Star, III class.

== Filmography ==
- 1974: Ooperiball (music film; scenarist)
- 1980: Kadunud poeg (music film; director)
- 1980: Medeia (music film; director)
- 1984: Naine (music film; director)
- 1987: Metsluiged (feature film; scenarist)
