= Lotte reis lõunamaale =

2000 animated film directed by Janno Põldma and Heiki Ernits

- Film poster
- Directed by: Janno Põldma, Heiki Ernits
- Produced by: Kalev Tamm, Linda Sade, Juha Vakkuri
- Production company: Eesti Joonisfilm
- Release date: 2000
- Running time: 65 minutes
- Country: Estonia
- Language: Estonian

Lotte reis lõunamaale (English: Lotte's Journey South) is a 2000 Estonian animated TV-series directed by Janno Põldma and Heiki Ernits. The film is one of the Lotte films.

Awards, participations:

- 2000: Estonian Film Journalists' Association's award: Neitsi Maali award (best film of the year)
- 2000: annual award by Cultural Endowment of Estonia
- 2000: SCHLINGEL - International Film Festival for Children and Young Audiences (Chemnitz, Germany), participating

== Cast ==
- Anu Lamp (narrator, voice)
- Evelin Pang (Lotte, voice)
