= Arvo Nuut =

Estonian film operator and film producer (1941–2021)

Arvo Nuut (13 April 1941 – 1 March 2021) was an Estonian film operator and film producer.

Since 1961 he worked at Tallinnfilm's puppetry department; being 1964-1989 an operator, 1989-1992 a producer. 1992-2013 he was the head and producer of OÜ Nukufilm.

In total he produced 57 animated films.

In 2006 he was awarded the Order of the White Star, V class.

== Filmography ==
- 2010 "Taevalaul"
- 2011 "Keha mälu"
- 2011 "Prohveti sünd"
- 2012 "Kolmnurga afäär"
