= Ülo Pikkov =

Estonian animator, film director and producer

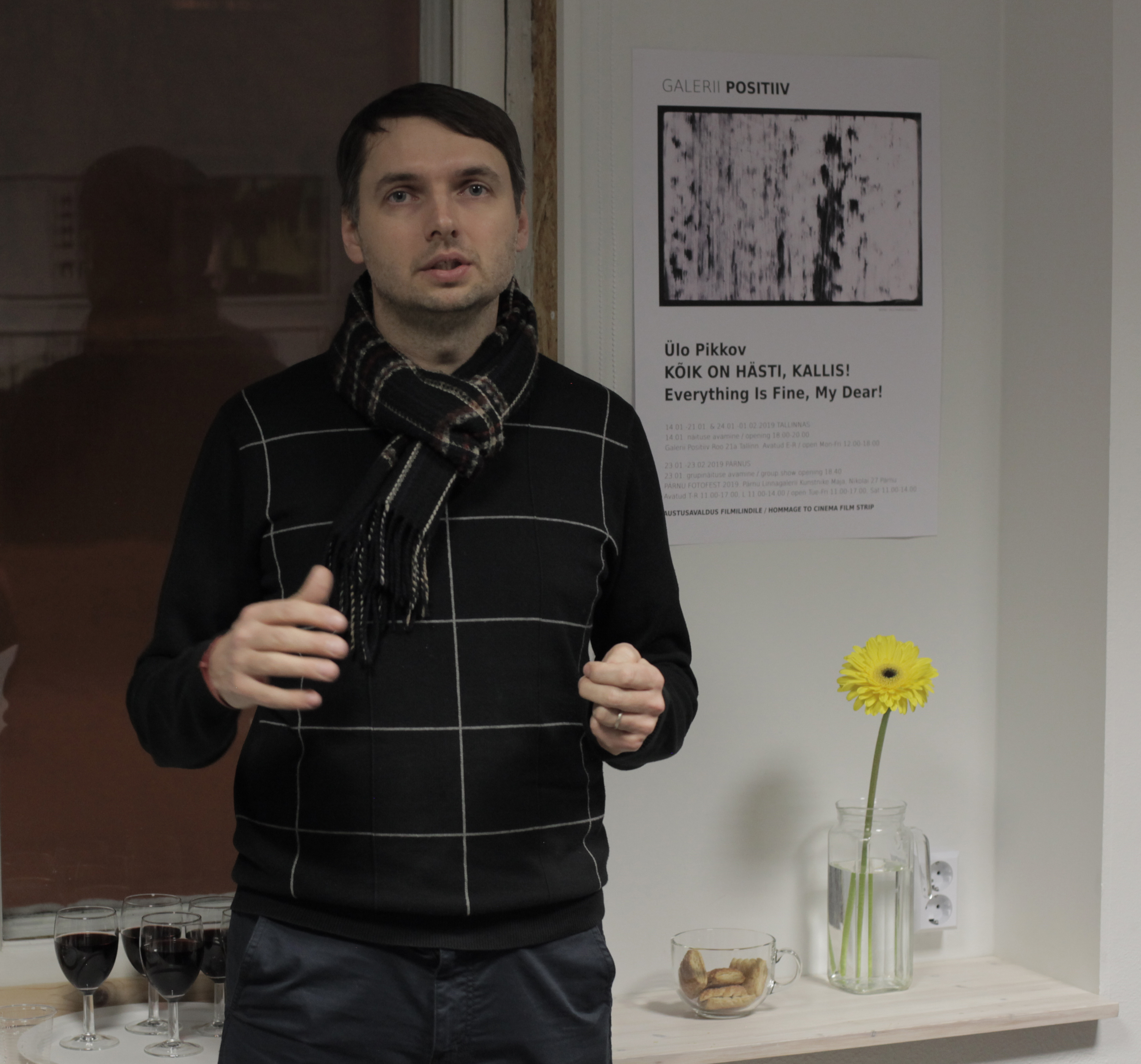
Pikkov in 2019

Ülo Pikkov (born 15 June 1976) is an Estonian animator, film director and producer.

Pikkov was born in Tallinn. In 1998 he graduated from Turku School of Art and Media. In 2005 he graduated from University of Tartu in law. In 2011 he began his doctoral studies at the Estonian Academy of Arts. He defended his doctorate in 2018 with his work "Anti-Animation, the Peculiarities of Eastern European Animated Film".

Between 2007 and 2011, Pikkov was the chairman of the audiovisual arts endowment of the Cultural Endowment of Estonia. Until 2016, he was an associate professor in the animation department of the Estonian Academy of Arts. He has written and illustrated books, as well as published caricatures, editorial cartoons and illustrations in the press. Since 2006 he has worked in film production company Silmviburlane.

His spouse is film director Heilika Pikkov.

== Selected filmography ==
- Cappuccino (1996)
- Rumba (1996)
- Year of the Monkey (2003)
- Frank and Wendy (with Priit Tender, Kaspar Jancis and Priit Pärn; 2003-2005)
