= Frank and Wendy =

2005 animated directed by Kaspar Jancis and others

- Directed by: Kaspar Jancis, Ülo Pikkov, Priit Tender
- Produced by: Kalev Tamm
- Production company: Eesti Joonisfilm
- Release dates: December 3, 2004 (Black Nights Film Festival); March 25, 2005 (Estonia)
- Running time: 75 minutes
- Country: Estonia
- Language: Estonian

Frank and Wendy (Estonian: Frank ja Wendy) is a 2005 Estonian animated film directed by Kaspar Jancis, Ülo Pikkov, and Priit Tender. It was released on December 3, 2004 (Black Nights Film Festival), March 25, 2005 (Estonia)

== Plot ==
Two FBI agents investigate Nazis and a devious plot that involves hamburgers.

== Cast ==
- Peeter Oja
- Jan Uuspõld
- Janne Shevtshenko
- Andrus Vaarik
- Anne Reemann
- Eduard Toman
- Tarmo Männard

== Accolades ==
Awards:

- 2004: annual award by Cultural Endowment of Estonia (best animated film of the year)
- 2005: ANIFEST - International Festival of Animated Films (Teplice, Czech), best television film
- 2006: FEST – Youth Video and Film Festival (Espinho, Portugal), audience prize for the best animated film
