= Kaspar Jancis =

Estonian director of animated films, musician, composer

- Born: 8 May 1975 (age 51); Tallinn, then part of Estonian SSR, Soviet Union
- Education: Tallinn University
- Occupations: Film director; musician; composer
- Parent: Mai Murdmaa (mother)

Kaspar Jancis (born 8 May 1975) is an Estonian director of animated films, musician, composer.

Kaspar Jancis was born in Tallinn as the son of Latvian pianist Valdis Jancis and Estonian ballet master, dancer and screenwriter Mai Murdmaa. Jancis' brother Rainer Jancis is a professional musician. He studied at Tallinn University and at Turku Arts and Media School, learning filmmaking.

He has published one children's book: Kapten Morten lollide laeval ('Morten on a Ship of Fools'; 2010).

== Films ==
- Väike valge helikopter (1997)
- Doktor Matšalka juhtum (1997)
- Romanss (1999)
- Weitzenbergi tänav (2002)
- Frank ja Wendy (with Priit Tender, Ülo Pikkov and Priit Pärn; 2003–2005)
- Maraton (2006)
- Captain Morten and the Spider Queen (2018)
