= Eduard Toman =

Estonian actor, director, singer

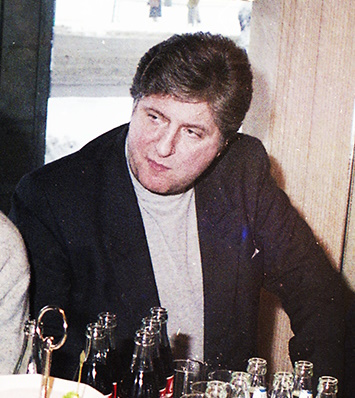
- Eduard Toman in 1996
- Born: May 25, 1960 (age 65); Kharkiv, Ukrainian SSR, Soviet Union
- Education: Shchukin Theatre School, Moscow (Graduated 1983)
- Occupations: Actor, theatre director, singer
- Years active: 1983–present
- Awards: Order of the White Star, V class (2002)

Eduard Toman (born 25 May 1960 in Kharkiv) is an Estonian actor, theatre director, and singer.

He graduated from the Shchukin Theatre School in Moscow in 1983. From 1983 to 1993 and again from 2005 to 2011, he worked as an actor at the Russian Theatre in Tallinn. Between 1993 and 2005, he served as the theatre's artistic director.

Besides his theatrical work, Toman has appeared in various films, television series, and voice acting roles.

== Awards ==
- 2002: Order of the White Star, V class

== Selected filmography ==
Selected screen appearances
Year	Title	Role	Notes
1992	Need vanad armastuskirjad	—	Feature film
1993–1995	Salmonid	—	TV series
1994	Tulivesi	—	Feature film
1997	All My Lenins	J. V. Stalin / Frontline Officer	Feature film
2005	Frank & Wendy	Voice of Putin	Animated film
2006–2007	Kelgukoerad	—	TV series
2008	Tuulepealne maa	Vorontsov	Historical TV drama
2009	Disco and Atomic War	Narrator (voice)	Documentary film
2010	Red Mercury (Punane elavhõbe)	Male singer	Feature film
2017	Green Cats	Meelis	Feature film
2020	Salmonid. 25 aastat hiljem	Jüri Dorbikov	TV mini-series
2021	Firebird	Toastmaster	International feature film

== Other work ==
Toman has also contributed as a composer, writing music for stage productions, and has participated in literary and cultural radio broadcasts. Since 2017, he has served as director of the Russian Cultural Center in Estonia. From 2017 to 2019, he was chairman of the Union of Russian Educational and Charitable Societies in Estonia.
