= The Old Man Movie =

2019 adult animated film directed by Mikk Mägi and Oskar Lehemaa

The Old Man
- Theatrical release poster
- Directed by: Mikk Mägi; Oskar Lehemaa
- Written by: Mikk Mägi; Oskar Lehemaa
- Produced by: Erik Heinsalu; Veiko Eske; Tanel Tatter; Mikk Mägi
- Starring: Mikk Mägi; Oskar Lehemaa; Jan Uuspõld; Märt Avandi; Jaagup Kreem
- Cinematography: Urmas Jõemees
- Edited by: Oskar Lehemaa
- Music by: Sten-Olle Molda; Lauri Kadalipp
- Production companies: BOP Animation; Apollo Film Productions; Enhanced Media
- Distributed by: HeaFilm (Estonia); Baltic Crime (International sales)
- Release date: September 27, 2019
- Running time: 88 minutes
- Country: Estonia
- Language: Estonian

The Old Man Movie (Estonian: Vanamehe film), also known as The Old Man Movie: Lactopalypse, is a 2019 Estonian adult animated comedy stop motion film directed by Mikk Mägi and Oskar Lehemaa. As of 2021 this film is the most successful Estonian full-length animated film. The film was watched by over 86,000 people.

== Plot ==
The grandchildren are coming to visit the Old Man in the country for the summer. It's far from an idyllic summer vacation at grandpa's place, because the Old Man is working hard on the land to feed both the children and his dairy cow. The rascals do not understand the customs of the countryside and cause the prized cow to run away. Now the Old Man and the kids have 24 hours to find the cow before the unmilked udder explodes and causes a dairy disaster. The old man and the children begin a merciless race against time, as the udder must be neutralized before the mysterious Old Milkman sends the cow to the heavenly meadow.

On this journey, our heroes come face-to-face with hipsters who despise the countryside, lumberjacks, meeting a rockstar inside of a brown bear and a pig suffering from constipation.

== Cast ==
- Old Man – Mikk Mägi
- Priidik – Mikk Mägi
- Aino – Mikk Mägi
- Mart – Oskar Lehemaa
- Piimavana – Jan Uuspõld
- Cow – Märt Avandi
- Jaagup Kreem – Jaagup Kreem

== Reception ==
On the review aggregator website Rotten Tomatoes, 100% of 8 critics' reviews are positive, with an average rating of 7.2/10.
