= Little Peeter's Dream =

1958 animated film directed by Elbert Tuganov

- Directed by: Elbert Tuganov
- Written by: Elbert Tuganov
- Starring: Toomas Niit (voice)
- Cinematography: Aimée Beekman
- Music by: Boris Kõrver
- Production company: Kunstiliste- ja Kroonikafilmide Tallinna Kinostuudio
- Release date: June 6, 1958
- Running time: 18 minutes
- Country: Estonia
- Language: Estonian

Little Peeter's Dream (Estonian: Peetrikese unenägu) is a 1958 Estonian animated film directed by Elbert Tuganov and based on the 1942 children's book Palle alene i Verden by Danish author Jens Sigsgaard. The film was the first Estonian animated film after WW II. In 2009 the film was digitally restored.

The film talks about little Peeter who wakes up on the morning and he finds that he is absolutely alone in the world. He begins to play and frolic. Finally he discovers that it was just a dream.
