= Aarne Ahi =

Estonian animator and film director

Aarne Ahi (born 11 September 1943, Tartu) is an Estonian animator and animated film director.

Since 1967 he worked at Tallinnfilm's department of puppetry (Estonian: Tallinnfilmi nukufilmi osakond), later he worked at Nukufilm.

== Selected filmography ==
Filmography per IMDB:

- 1975 "Lapsehoidjad" ("Babysitters" in English)
- 1978 "Linalakk ja Rosalin" ("Linalakk and Rosalin" in English)
- 1980 "Karsumm" ("Heat" in English)
- 1985 "Vägev vähk ja ahne naine" ("The Mighty Cancer and the Greedy Woman" in English)
- 1987 "Magus planeet" ("Sweet Planet" in English)
- 1988 "Linnupüüdja" ("Bird Catcher" in English)
- 1991 "Kingikratt" ("Gift Cart" in English, called "The House Spirit" and "The Foxy Christmas Story" in English Broadcasts)
