= Priit Tender =

Estonian animator and animated film director

Priit Tender (born 1971 in Tallinn) is an Estonian animator and animated film director.

His animation films have won numerous prizes from international animation film festivals. Since 2019, he has been the head of the animation department of the Estonian Academy of Arts.

== Selected filmography ==
- 1895 (with Priit Pärn and Janno Põldma; 1995)
- Gravitation (1996)
- The Crow and the Mice (1998)
- Viola (1999)
- Mont Blanc (2001)
- Frank and Wendy (with Priit Pärn, Kaspar Jancis and Ülo Pikkov; 2003-2005)
- Orpheus (2019)
