= Heino Pars =

Estonian animated film director

Heino Pars (13 October 1925 Mustla, Viljandi County – 8 October 2014 Tallinn) was an Estonian animated film director. With Elbert Tuganov, he is the founder of Estonian puppetry animation.

In 2001 he was awarded with Order of the White Star, V class.

== Filmography ==
- 1962 "Väike motoroller"
- 1964 "Operaator Kõps seeneriigis"
- 1972 "Nael I"
