= Avo Paistik =

Estonian cartoonist, author, film director, painter and pastor

- Born: Avo Paistik; 21 April 1936; Tallinn, Estonia
- Died: 3 December 2013 (aged 77); Estonia
- Occupations: Cartoonist, author, film director, painter, pastor
- Years active: 1973–1991

Avo Paistik (21 April 1936 − 3 December 2013) was an Estonian cartoonist, author, illustrator, film director, painter and pastor.

Born in Tallinn, Paistik animation short film credits included Lend, Tolmuimeja, Klaabu, Nipi ja tige kala, Klaabu kosmoses, Naksitrallid and Naksitrallid II. He left animation in 1991 to become a pastor.

Avo Paistik died of an undisclosed disease-related cause on 3 December 2013, aged 77.
