= Mait Laas =

Estonian animated film director

Mait Laas (born 4 August 1970, Tallinn) is an Estonian animated film director, producer, scenarist and artist.

== Filmography ==
- 2008 "Aja meistrid" ('The Kings of the Time')
- 2013 "Lisa Limone ja Maroc Orange: tormakas armulugu" ('Lisa Limone and Maroc Orange: A Rapid Love Story')
- 2016 "Mees ja naine"
