= Mati Kütt =

Estonian animated film director and caricaturist (born 1947)

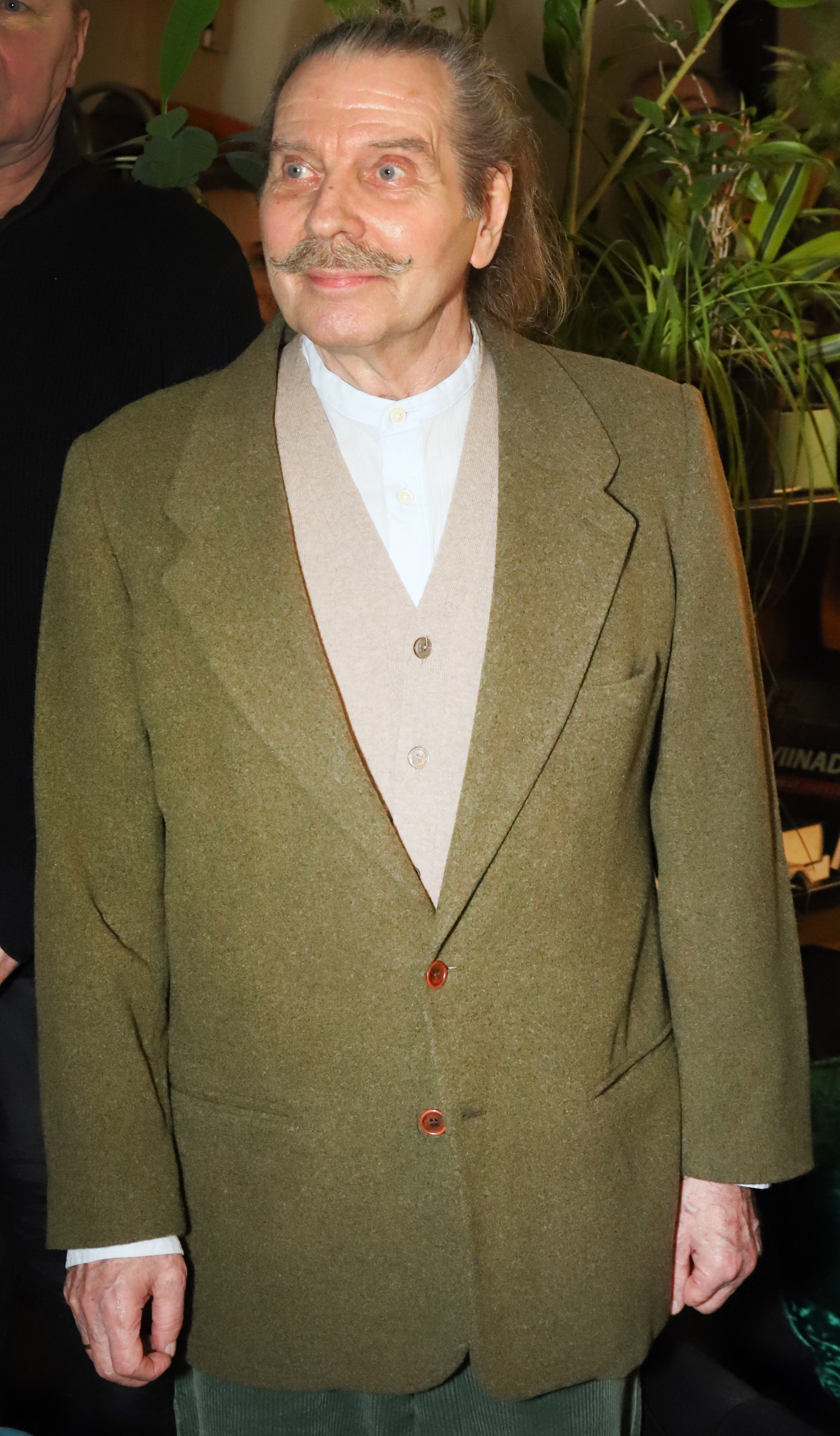
- Born: 5 April 1947 (age 79); Tallinn, then part of Estonian SSR, Soviet Union
- Occupations: Animated film director; caricaturist; painter

Mati Kütt (born 5 April 1947) is an Estonian animated film director, caricaturist and painter known for Une instituut (2006), Põrandaalune (1997) and Labürint (1989).

== Early life ==
Kütt was born on 5 April 1947 in Tallinn.

== Career ==
1974–1994 he worked at Tallinnfilm. Since 1995 he is a freelancer.

== Filmography ==
- 1989 Animated Self-Portraits
- 1989 Labyrinth
- 1992 Sprott võtmas päikest
- 1995 Plekkmäe Liidi
- 2002 Nööbi odüsseia
- 2003 Moonwatch
- 2005 Cricet
- 2006 Une instituut
- 2007 Black Ceiling
- 2010 Sky Song
