= Rao Heidmets =

Estonian animated film director

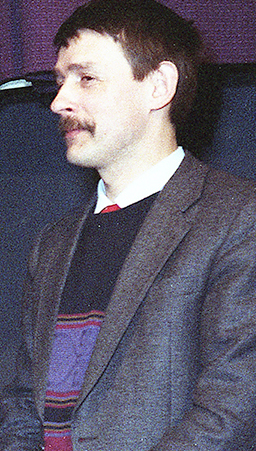
- Heidmets in 1994
- Born: September 15, 1956 (age 69); Pärnu, then part of Estonian SSR, Soviet Union

Rao Heidmets (born 15 September 1956) is an Estonian animated film director, producer and scenarist.

In 1982, he started to work at Tallinnfilm. In 1991, he established his own production company Rao Heidmetsa Filmistuudio. Since 2002, he is a film director in Nukufilm.

In 2005, he was awarded with Order of the White Star, V class.

== Filmography ==
- 1983 "Tuvitädi"
- 1985 "Nuril"
- 1998 "Kallis härra Q"
