= Olga Pärn =

Estonian animator, film director and illustrator

Olga Pärn (née Marchenko; born 1 January 1976) is a Belarusian-Estonian animator, film director and illustrator.

She was born in Minsk and graduated from Belarusian State Academy of Arts in graphic arts. Afterwards, she graduated from La Poudrière animation school in Valence, studying film direction.

She is working at Estonian Academy of Arts, being a visiting professor there.

Her illustrations are awarded several times. In 2015, she won the special price of the Estonian Children's Literature Centre because of her illustrations for the children's book "Telephone Tales".

Her husband is an Estonian animator Priit Pärn.
