= Riho Unt =

Estonian animated film director

Riho Unt (born May 15, 1956, in Kose-Risti) is an Estonian animated film director, scenarist, and artist. He studied animation at the Tallinn Art Institute, graduating in 1980. After his studies, he worked as an animator at Tallinnfilm and Nukufilm. In 1989, he founded his own animation studio, Riho Unt Film.

Unt's first major film was Kapsapea (Cabbagehead), which was released in 1993. The film is a satirical look at Estonian society in the post-Soviet era. It was a critical and commercial success, and it won several awards, including the Grand Prix at the Annecy International Animated Film Festival.

In 2001 he was awarded the Order of the White Star, Fifth Class.

== Filmography ==
- 1986: Kevadine kärbes (with Hardi Volmer)
- 1993: Kapsapea
- 1997: Tagasi Euroopasse
- 2000: Saamueli internet
- 2005: Vennad karusüdamed
- 2015: Isand
