= Elbert Tuganov =

Azerbaijani-Estonian animator and film director (1922–2007)

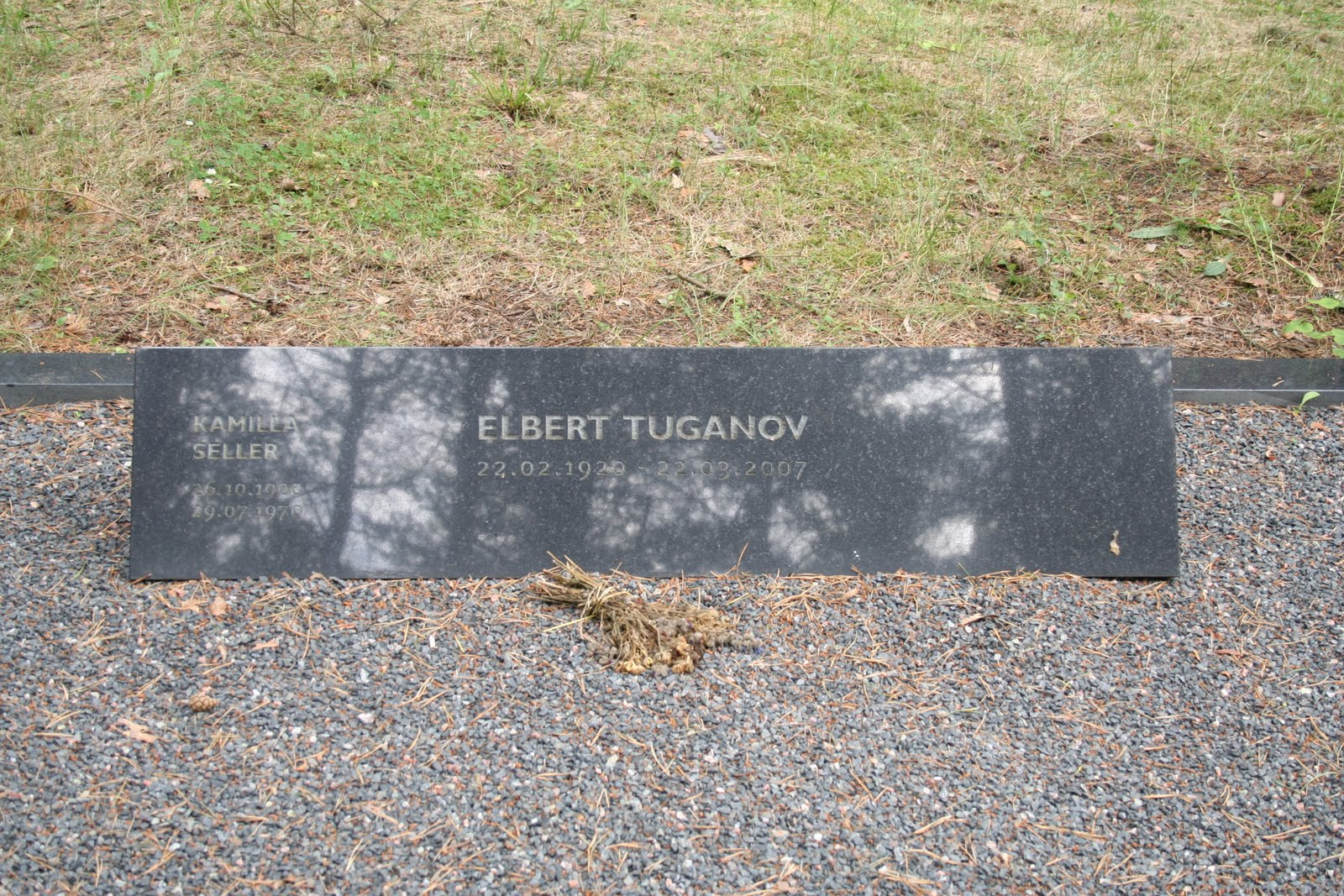
- The grave of Elbert Tuganov

Personal information
- Nationality: Soviet Union; Estonia
- Born: 22 February 1920 Baku, Azerbaijan Soviet Socialist Republic
- Died: March 22, 2007 (aged 87) Tallinn, Estonia

Elbert Tuganov (Russian: Эльберт Азгиреевич Туганов, Iron Ossetic: Тугъанаты Азджерийы фырт Эльберт, romanized: Tughanaty Azĝerijy fyrt Elbert; 22 February 1920 – 22 March 2007) was an Azerbaijani-Estonian animator and film director. He is known as "the father of Estonian animation".

== Life ==
Tuganov was born in Baku, Azerbaijan to an Estonian mother and an Ossetian father. In 1946 he joined with Tallinnfilm. In 1958 he created the first Estonian animated film Peetrikese unenägu.

== Animated films ==
In total he created 38 animated films.

- Peetrikese unenägu (1958)
- Põhjakonn (1959)
- Metsamuinasjutt (1960)
- Ott kosmoses (1961)
- Mina ja Murri (1961)
- Kaks lugu (1962)
- Peaaegu uskumatu lugu (1962)
- Just nii (1963)
- Hiirejaht (1965)
- Park (1966)
- Jonn (1966)
- Žanri sünd (1967)
- Ahvipoeg Fips (1968)
- Hammasratas (1968)
- Aatomik (1970)
- Aatomik ja Jõmmid (1970)
- Jalakäijad (1971)
- Suveniir (1977)
- Köpenicki kapten (1978)
- Kaupmees ja ahvid (1979)
- Giufa (1979)
- Ohver (1980)
- Õunkimmel (1981)
