= Hardi Volmer =

Estonian musician, film director and politician

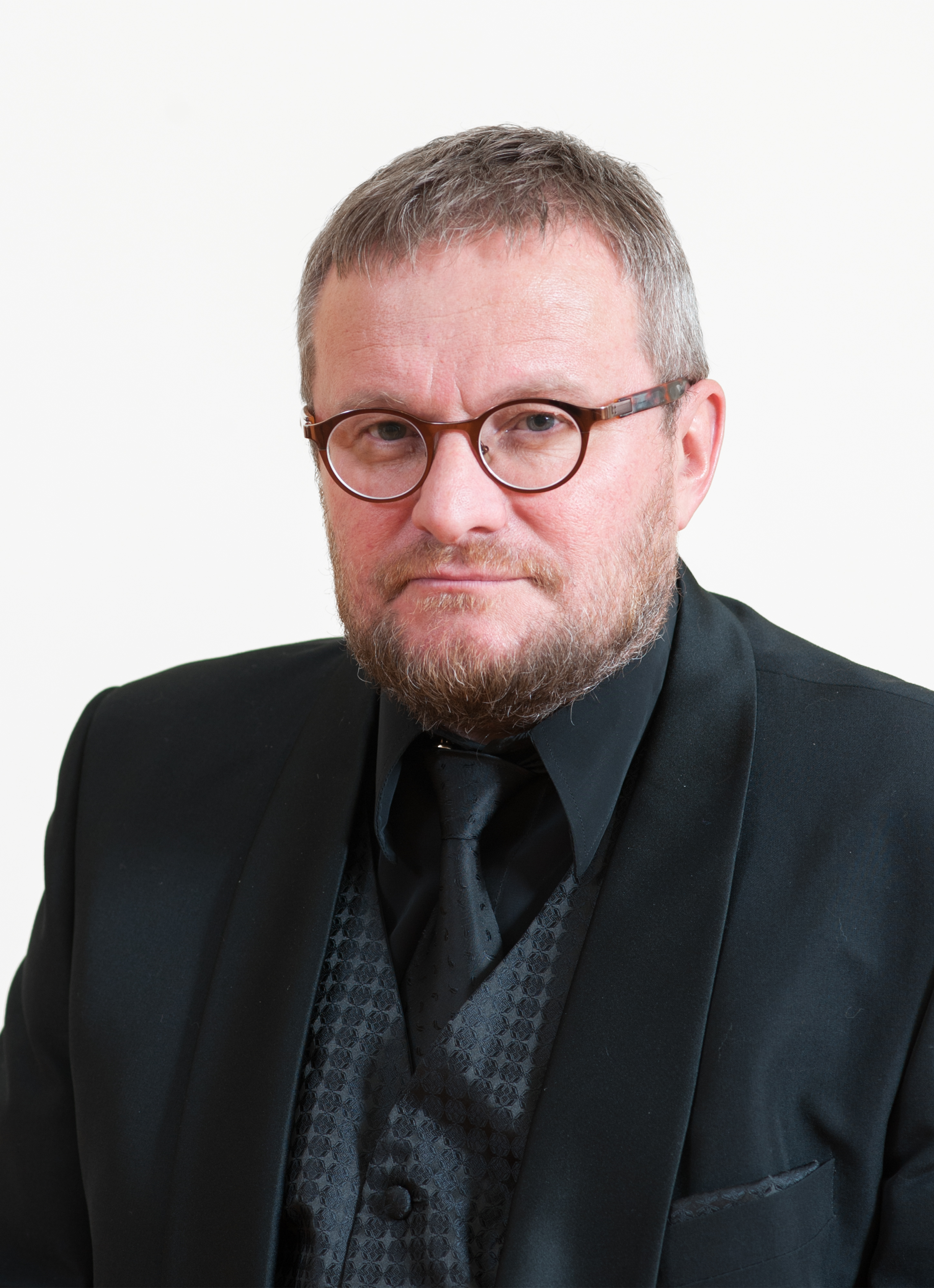
- Hardi Volmer in 2015

Background information
- Born: Hardi Volmer; 8 November 1957 (age 68); Pärnu, then part of Estonian SSR, Soviet Union
- Formerly of: Singer Vinger

Hardi Volmer (born 8 November 1957 in Pärnu) is an Estonian film director, puppet theatre set decorator and musician. Volmer is the singer in the Estonian punk rock band Singer Vinger.

== Animated cartoons ==
- "Imeline nääriöö" (Wonderful New Year's Eve, 1984)
- "Nõiutud saar" (Bewitched Island, 1985)
- "Kevadine kärbes" (Fly in Spring, 1986)
- "Sõda" (War, 1987)
- "Tööd ja tegemised" (Works and Doings, 1988)
- "Animeeritud autoportreed" (Animated Self-portraits, 1989)
- "Jackpot" (1990)
- "Incipit vita nova" (1992)
- "Hilinenud romanss" (Late Romance, 1994)
- "Keegi veel" (Someone More, 1998)
- "Primavera" (1999)

== Movies ==
- KALKAR (1980)
- Igaühele oma ("Something to Everyone", 1992)
- Tulivesi ("Firewater", 1994)
- Minu Leninid ("All My Lenins", 1997)
- Elavad pildid ("Living Images", 2013)
- Johannes Pääsukese tõeline elu ("Johannes Pääsuke's Real Life", 2019)
