= Cultural Endowment of Estonia =

State-owned cultural foundation in Estonia

Cultural Endowment of Estonia (Estonian: Eesti Kultuurkapital, abbreviated Kulka or KULKA; also translated as Estonian Cultural Capital) is an Estonian foundation which supports activities related to Estonian culture. The foundation was established in 1925 and re-established in 1994.

The foundation was established in 1925 after the Estonian Parliament passed the Cultural Endowment of Estonia Act. It was decided that scholarships are to be given twice a year: on 1 April and on 1 October.

The foundation was re-established in 1994 after the Estonian Parliament passed a new Cultural Endowment of Estonia Act.

The foundation gives also literary awards (Estonian: Eesti Kultuurkapitali kirjanduspreemia) and a yearly prize (Estonian: Eesti Kultuurkapitali aastapreemia).
