= Eesti Joonisfilm =

Estonian film studio

Eesti Joonisfilm is an Estonian animated film studio, located in Tallinn, Estonia.

The studio was established on 22 December 1993 when restructuring of Tallinnfilm took place.

In 2013, Heiki Ernitsa and Andrus Kivirähki's "Inventors Village Lotte" digital book for tablets was completed.

== Animated films ==
- 1992 – "Hotell E"
- 1995 – "Plekkmäe Liidi"
- 1995 – "Tallinna legendid"
- 1995 – "1895"
- 1996 – "Gravitatsioon"
- 1997 – "Tom ja Fluffy"
- 1998 – "Bermuda"
- 1998 – "Porgandite öö"
- 1999 – "Viola"
- 1999 – "Armastuse võimalikkusest"
- 2000 – "Lotte reis lõunamaale"
- 2001 – "Peata ratsanik"
- 2001 – "Mont Blanc"
- 2001 – "Superlove"
- 2001 – "Lepatriinude jõulud"
- 2002 – "Weitzenbergi tänav"
- 2002 – "Kontsert porgandipirukale"
- 2003 – "Ahviaasta"
- 2003 – "Karl ja Marilyn"
- 2003-2005 – "Frank ja Wendy"
- 2006 – "Sõnum naabritele"
- 2006 – "Elu maitse"
- 2006 – "Leiutajateküla Lotte"
- 2006 – "Maraton"
- 2007 – "Must Lagi"
- 2007 – "Seinameistrid"
- 2007 – "Üks"
- 2008 – "Dialogos"
- 2008 – "Elu ilma Gabriella Ferrita"
- 2008 – "Köögi dimensioonid"
- 2009 – "Krokodill"
- 2009 – "Õhus"
- 2010 – "Tuukrid vihmas"
- 2011 – "Lotte ja kuukivi saladus"
- 2012 – "Villa Antropoff"
- 2012 – "Ussinuumaja"
