= Priit Pärn =

Estonian animation director and caricaturist

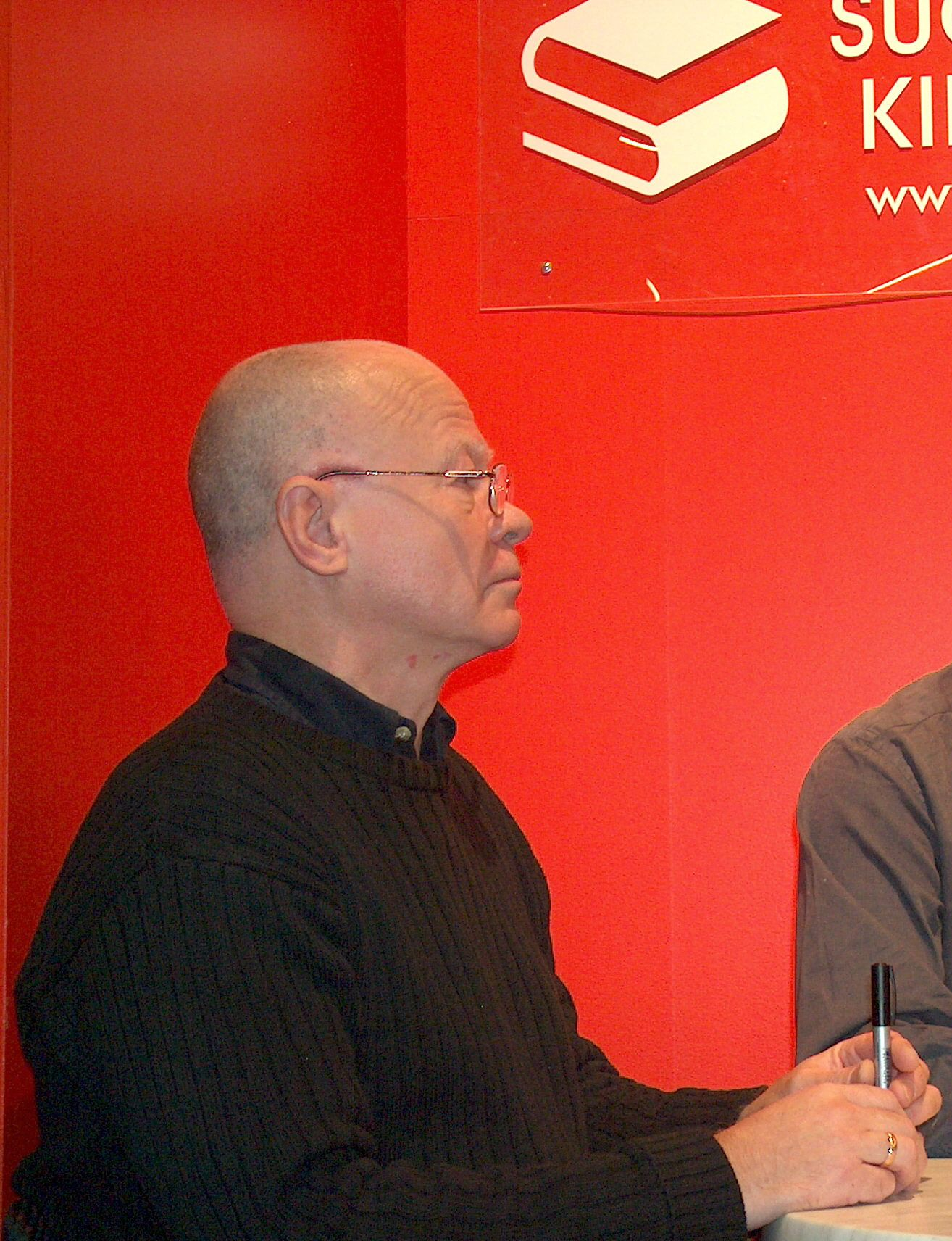
- Priit Pärn in 2004.
- Born: 26 August 1946 (age 80); Tallinn, then part of Estonian SSR, Soviet Union
- Occupation: Animation director
- Awards: 2004 Zagreb World Festival of Animated Films Special Jury Award; 1998 Grand Prize Ottawa International Animation Festival; 1999 Silver Dove Dok Leipzig; 1988 Grand Prize Zagreb World Festival of Animated Films; 1996 Craft Prize Ottawa International Animation Festival; 1996 Grand Prize Zagreb World Festival of Animated Films

Priit Pärn (born 26 August 1946 in Tallinn) is an Estonian cartoonist and animation director whose films have enjoyed success among critics as well as the public at various film festivals.

Pärn formerly worked as a plant ecologist; his career in animation began when he accepted Rein Raamat's proposal to make a design for Kilplased (1974). After a brief apprenticeship in Joonisfilm, he directed his first film Is the Earth Round? in 1977.

Pärn's most important films are considered to be Triangle (1982), Breakfast on the Grass (1987), Hotel E (1992), 1895 (co-directed by Janno Põldma, 1995) and Night of the Carrots (1998).

Pärn's style is characterized by black humour, playful surrealism and a unique graphic style. His somewhat crude style marked the departure from both Rein Raamat's overtly serious and moralizing films as well as the Disneyesque style propagated by the directors of Soyuzmultfilm. In his footsteps (and occasionally copying his style to a large degree) have followed numerous new generation Estonian filmmakers, most notably Ülo Pikkov and Priit Tender.

Influences of Pärn's graphical style can also be seen in such commercial animated series as Rugrats and AAAHH!!! Real Monsters!, both of which are produced by Klasky Csupo and directed by Igor Kovalyov for Nickelodeon.

In 2002 Pärn was awarded the Lifetime Achievement Award from the International Animated Film Association, and he received Lifetime Achievement Award at the World Festival of Animated Film - Animafest Zagreb in 2008.

Divers in the Rain (2010), co-directed with his wife Olga Pärn, became the most successful Estonian animated film of all time with its 18th award at KROK International Animated Film Festival in Ukraine.

Pärn had taught animation at the Arts Academy of the Turku University of Applied Sciences in Turku, Finland since 1994 and now teaches at Estonian Academy of Arts.

== Animated films ==
A screenshot from Night of the Carrots (1998), showcasing a rabbit talking to a vintage TV.

- Is The Earth Round? (Kas maakera on ümmargune?, 1977)
- ...And Plays Tricks (...Ja teeb trikke, 1978)
  - The best children's film from 2nd Varna Animated Film Festival, Bulgaria 1981
- Exercises in Preparation For Independent Life (Harjutusi iseseisvaks eluks, 1980)
  - 2nd Prize at the 15th USSR filmfestival, 1981
- The Triangle (Kolmnurk, 1982)
- Time Out (Aeg maha, 1984)
  - Grand Prix Varna Animated Film Festival, Bulgaria 1985
  - 1st Prize from the International Animated Film Festival Cinanima in Espinho , Portugal 1985
  - Best animated film Bilbao Short Film Festival, Spain 1985
- Breakfast on the Grass (Eine murul, 1987)
  - Grand Prix from the XVIII Tampere Short Film Festival, Finland 1988
  - Grand Prix, best film in category C and critics prize from VIII Zagreb World Festival of Animated Films, 1988
  - 3rd Audience Prize from Short Film Festival in Bonn, Germany 1988
  - 1st Prize in category C from 1st Animated Film Festival in Shanghai, 1988
  - Grand Prix from the International Animated Film Festival Cinanima in Espinho , Portugal 1988
  - 1st Prize from the XXI USSR Film Festival in Baku, 1988
  - Best Animated Film Award from Melbourne Film Festival, Australia 1988
  - 3rd Prize from VIII Odense Film Festival, Denmark 1989
  - Nika – the highest prize of the USSR film industry 1989
- Commercial spot: Switch Off The Lights (Kustuta valgus, 1988)
  - Bronze Lion 35thCannes International Advertising Festival, France 1988
- Hotel E (1992)
  - Prize of Land Baden-Württemberg from International Festival of Animated Film in Stuttgart , Germany 1992
- 1895 (1995) (co-director Janno Põldma )
  - 3rd Prize, awarded by festival's youth jury from 11th International Odense Film Festival 1995 (Denmark)
  - The Prize of Russian ASIFA from 3rd International Animated Film Festival Krok 95, Ukraine 1995
  - The Russian Critics' Prize from 3rd International Animated Film Festival Krok 95, Ukraine 1995
  - Prize in Class C, awarded by International Jury from 19th International Animated Film Festival of Espinho Cinanima , Portugal 1995
  - The Estonian Film Critics (FIPRESCI) Prize for the best film of the year 1995
  - Estonian Cultural Endowment's annual Johannes Pääsuke Award 1995
  - The Republic of Estonia's State Cultural Award for the film "1895" in the year 1995
  - The Festival Jury Special Prize from Balticum Film & TV Festival in Bornholm, Denmark 1996
  - Best Film Award from Oslo Animation Festival , Norway 1996
  - Grand Prix from 12th World Festival of Animated Films in Zagreb, Croatia 1996
  - The Critics' Award given by the Jury of the Association of Croatian Film Critics, Croatia 1996
  - Magic Chrystal Prize 6th International Film Forum Arsenals in Riga, Latvia 1996
  - Best Design Award from Ottawa International Animation Festival , Canada 1996
  - Grand Prix from Pärnu Film Days, Estonia 1997
  - Prize for Outstanding Film in General Category from '97 Seoul Animation Expo, South-Korea 1997
- Commercial spot: Deliss (1995)
- Commercial spot: Absolut Pärn (1996)
  - Diploma from International Animated Film Festival Krok 97, Ukraine 1997
  - Diploma from Holland Animated Film Festival in Utrecht, the Netherlands 1996
- Free Action (1996)
- Night of the Carrots (Porgandite öö, 1998)
  - Grand Prix from Ottawa International Animation Festival , Canada 1998
  - Special Jury Prize from Oslo Animation Festival , Norway 1999
  - 2nd Prize Silver Dove from 42nd International Leipzig Festival of Documentary and Animated Film, Germany 1999
  - 1stPrize from World Animation Celebration Competition, Los Angeles, USA 2000
- Karl And Marilyn (Karl ja Marilyn, 2003)
  - Best International Film at FAN International Animation Festival, UK 2003
  - Special Jury Award from 16th World Festival of Animated Films in Zagreb, Croatia2004
- Frank And Wendy (Frank ja Wendy, 2003–2005) (co-authors: P.Tender, Ü.Pikkov, K.Jancis / joonisfilm 7 x 9,5 min)
  - Estonian Cultural Endowment's Prize for the best Animated Film "Frank ja Wendy" in the year 2005
  - Newspaper Eesti Ekspress cultural extra Prize of the year 2005
  - Audience best animated film prize from film festival de Cinema & Video in Portugal, 2006
- I Feel Back of My Head (Ma kuklas tunnen 2007) (co-director O.Marchenko / 2 min / 35 mm / short story from animated film Black Ceiling)
- Life Without Gabriella Ferri (Elu Ilma Gabriella Ferrita, 2008)
  - Grand Prix from the 12th Holland International Animated Film Festival, Utrecht, Holland 2008
  - Grand Prix and the Anoba nomination for the Best Animated Film in the Baltic and Nordic countries from the Animated Dreams Animated Film Festival, Estonia 2008
  - Scottish Leader Estonian Film Award, Black Nights Film Festival 2008, Estonia 2008
  - Estonian Cultural Endowment's award for Best Animation, 2008
  - Jury Special Mention, World Festival of Animated Film - Animafest Zagreb, Croatia 2009
  - ANOBA prize, 2009
  - Grand Prix, I Castelli Animati, Italia, 2009
  - Jury Special Prize, MONSTRA IAFF, Portugal 2011
- Divers in the Rain (Tuukrid Vihmas, 2010) (co-director Olga Pärn )
  - Silver Jabberwocky prize from the 16th Etiuda&Anima Film Festival, Poland 2009
  - Don Quixote – International Federation of Film Societies Award from the 16th Etiuda&Anima Film Festival, Poland 2009
  - Grand Prix from Anima, the International Animation Film Festival of Brussels, Belgium 2010
  - Grand Prix from the MONSTRA – Lisbon Animation Film Festival, Portugal 2010
  - Best Sound Track award from the MONSTRA – Lisbon Animation Film Festival, Portugal 2010
  - Grand Prix from the World Festival of Animated Film - Animafest Zagreb, Croatia 2010
  - Hiroshima Prize from the Hiroshima International Animation Festival, Japan 2010
  - Best Story from Fantoche International Animation Festival, September 2010
  - Best Sound from Fantoche International Animation Festival, September 2010
  - Best Short Film award Silver Wolf from Festival du Nouveaux Cinema, Canada 2010
  - Grand Prix from International Animation Festival Tofuzi, Georgia 2010
  - Best Nordic and Baltic Short Film award from the Fredrikstad Animation Festival, Norway 2010
  - Prize for the Best Medium Length Film from the International Animated Film Festival CINANIMA, Portugal 2010
  - Award for the Best Story from the Animated Dreams, Estonia 2010
  - Grand Prix from International Animation Festival Anifest, Czech Republic 2011
  - Best International Short Film from International Animation Festival Anifilm, Czech Republic 2011
  - Special Distinction for the Best Direction from International Animation Festival Animanima, Serbia 2011
  - Grand Prix from International Animation Festival Krok, Ukraine 2011
- Luna Rossa (2024) (co-director Olga Pärn )

== Art exhibitions ==
- Tallinn, Estonia 1982, 1984, 1992
- Viitasaari, Finland 1988
- Tampere, Finland 1989
- Turku, Finland 1989
- Helsinki, Finland 1990, 1992, 1995
- Stuttgart, Germany 1990
- Volda, Molde, Grimstad, Norway 1990
- Odense, Denmark 1991
- Heidelberg, Germany 1992
- Karlsruhe, Germany 1992
- Hafnarfjörður, Ísland 1992
- Brussels, Belgium 1993
- Annecy, France 1993
- Genève, Switzerland 1993
- Harlem, Holland 1994
- Baden, Switzerland 1995
- Genève, Switzerland 1995
