= Heiki Ernits =

Estonian film director

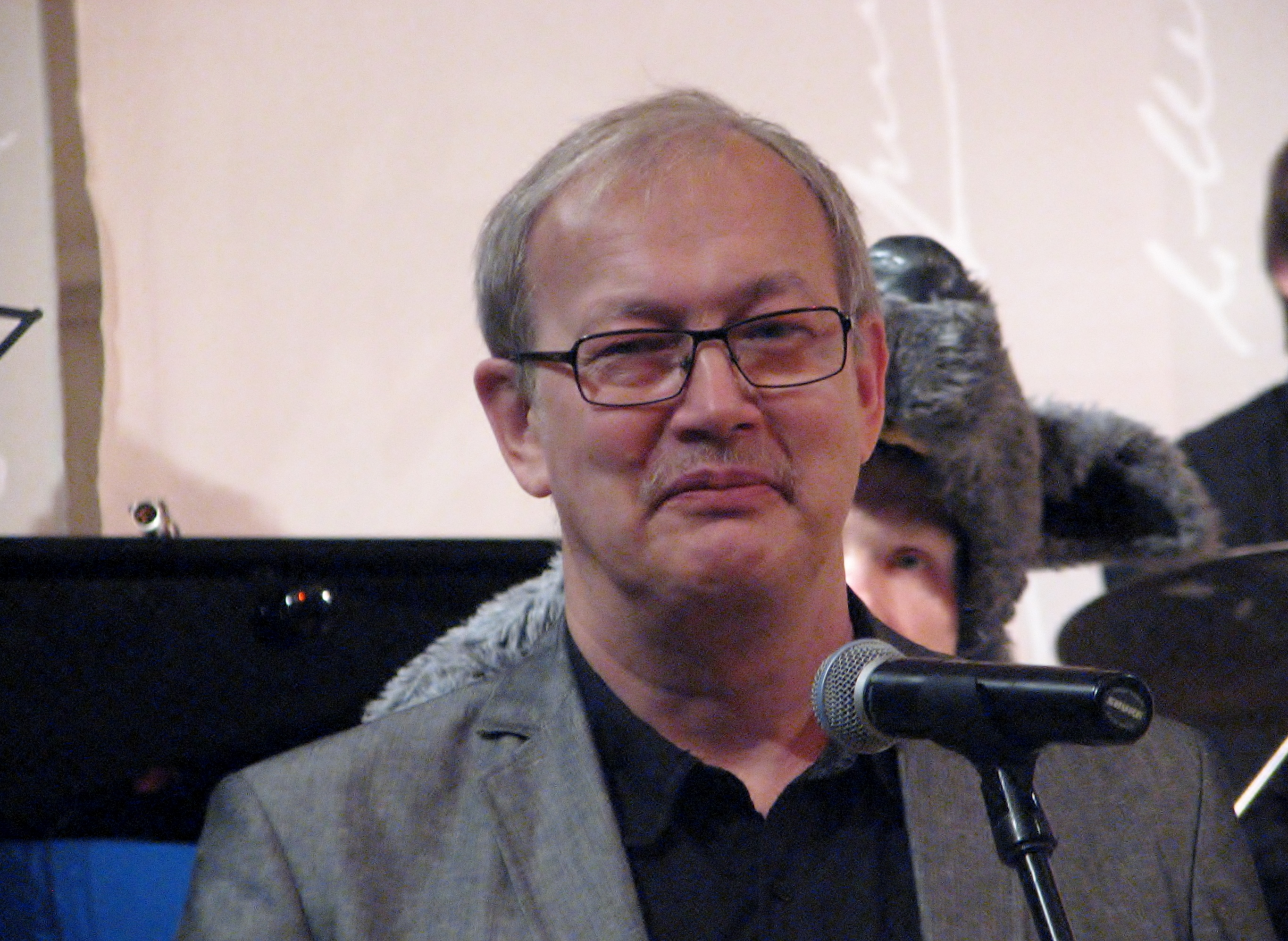
Heiki Ernits in 2014

Heiki Ernits (born 24 March 1953) is an Estonian animator, illustrator, and film director.

He graduated from the Tallinn Pedagogical Institute as a teacher of arts and crafts.

He has created 19 animated films and illustrated over 30 children's books. He has received 6 Nukits Awards.

With Janno Põldma, he created the popular character Lotte.
