= Nukufilm =

Film production company based in Estonia

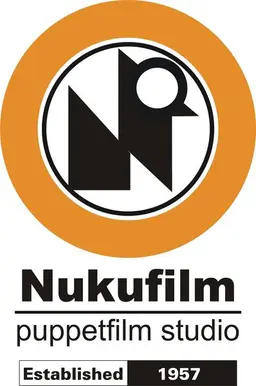

Nukufilm OÜ is an animation studio in Tallinn, Estonia. This studio is the biggest stop-motion animation studio in Northern Europe.

The studio was established in 1957.

In 1993, the studio was disjointed from Tallinnfilm.

== Produced animated films ==
During its existence of over 60 years, the studio is produced over 200 animated films (for full list, see list of Estonian animated films).
