= Janno Põldma =

Estonian film director and writer

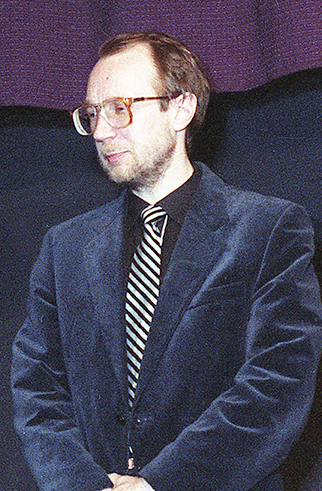
Põldma in 1994

Janno Põldma (born 7 November 1950 in Tallinn) is an Estonian film director and children's writer.

Since 1973 he has worked in Tallinnfilm Studio.

He has filmed about 20 animated films, mostly Priit Pärn's animation films.

== Works ==
=== Films ===
- Tom and Fluffy
- The Boy Who Did Not Want To Be an Actor
- Ladybirds' Christmas
- Lotte from Gadgetville
- Lotte As a Detective
- Lotte and the Moonstone Secret
- Lotte and the Lost Dragons

=== Children's books ===
- 1985: "Judo Boys"
- Ladybirds' Christmas
- Lotte and the Moonstone Secret
- The Lotte ABC Book (with Heiki Ernits)
