= Karin Rask =

Estonian actress

- Born: Karin Lätsim; 21 April 1979 (age 47); Haapsalu, then part of Estonian SSR, Soviet Union
- Occupation: Actress
- Years active: 2001–present
- Spouse: Rasmus Rask
- Children: 3

Karin Rask (until 2005, Karin Lätsim; born 21 April 1979) is an Estonian stage, film and television actress, theatre teacher and clothing designer.

== Early life and education ==
Karin Rask was born as Karin Lätsim in Haapsalu, in Lääne County in 1979. She attended secondary school at Haapsalu Gymnasium, graduating in 1997. From 1997 until 1998, she studied radio and program direction at Tallinn Pedagogical University (now, Tallinn University). In 2002, she graduated from the Higher Theatre School (now, the Estonian Academy of Music and Theatre) in Tallinn. Among her graduating classmates were Priit Võigemast, Ott Aardam, Maria Soomets, Hele Kõre, Mart Toome, Evelin Võigemast, Elisabet Reinsalu, and Argo Aadli.

== Stage career ==
In 2002, shortly after graduation, Rask (then known by her birth name, Lätsim) joined the Estonian Puppet and Youth Theatre (also called the Estonian State Puppet Theatre. More commonly called the NUKU theatre) in Tallinn's Old Town. She would remain with the NUKU until 2014. Roles at the NUKU include works by such Estonian authors and playwrights, and as: Ivar Põllu, Paul-Eerik Rummo, Triin Voorel, Andrus Kivirähk, Andres Roosileht, Kalju Kangur, Urmas Lennuk, and Eno Raud. Roles in productions of international playwrights and authors include those of: Anders Byström, Judy Upton, Gianni Rodari, the Brothers Grimm, Selma Lagerlöf, Jim Jacobs and Warren Casey.

After her departure from the NUKU theatre, Rask became a freelance actress. She has performed in roles at the Estonian Drama Theatre in Tallinn, the Theatre Randlane in Haapsalu, and the Von Krahl Theatre in Tallinn, among others. Rask is currently involved with the Polygon theatre, based in Tallinn, where she is both an actress and theatre teacher.

== Television and film ==
Rask's first feature film debut (credited as Karin Lätsim) was a small role in the 2002 Elmo Nüganen directed war drama Nimed marmortahvlil, which focuses on a group of young men fighting in the 1918–1920 Estonian War of Independence. The film was based on the 1936 novel of the same name by Albert Kivikas. In 2007, she appeared in another small role in the Dirk Hoyer directed crime drama Võõras. In 2008, Rask was a co-presenter of the TV3 musical reality competition series Laulud tähtedega with actor Marko Matvere. In 2015, Rask appeared in the Margus Paju directed family adventure film Supilinna Salaselts and the following year played the role of Simone in the René Vilbre directed Taska Film comedy Klassikokkutulek. Beginning in 2015, Rask starred on the TV3 thriller Varjudemaa. The series follows Rask's character Rita Metsallik as she returns home to the small village on a fictional island where she grew up after living in Tallinn for twenty years to bury her deceased father, only to discover that his death was not an accident.

She has also appeared in a number of film shorts, most notably 2015's drama Tiibadeta piloot, directed by Leeni Linna and pairing Rask with actor Priit Võigemast.

Rask has also appeared on several Estonian television series; most notably as Lucy on the TV3 drama Kodu keset linna in 2003, and again from 2005 to 2006; as Triin Mets on the popular Kanal 2 crime drama Kelgukoerad from 2007 until 2008; and as Kiku on the TV3 drama Nurjatud tüdrukud in 2012. Other appearances on television series include three appearances on the TV3 comedy crime series Kättemaksukontor in 2009 and 2013, and a 2014 appearance on the Kanal 2 crime drama Viimane võmm. In 2017, she had a starring role as Eva in the Kanal 2 drama-mystery series Nukumaja.

== Clothing designer ==
In 2013, Rask began designing clothes for children. She initially came up with the idea after designing and creating clothing for her daughter. After several people began to enquire about the clothes, Rask began making clothing for others. Eventually, she started a clothing line called Kalamaja Printsess. All of the fabrics are recycled and repurposed from surplus or salvaged from old clothing, curtains and other fabrics and each outfit is unique.

== Personal life ==
In August 2005, Karin Lätsim married lawyer Rasmus Rask. The couple have three children: a son born in 2006, daughter born in 2009, and a son born in 2019. The family reside in Tallinn. Since her marriage, she has used her married surname, Rask.
