= Elisabet Reinsalu =

Estonian actress

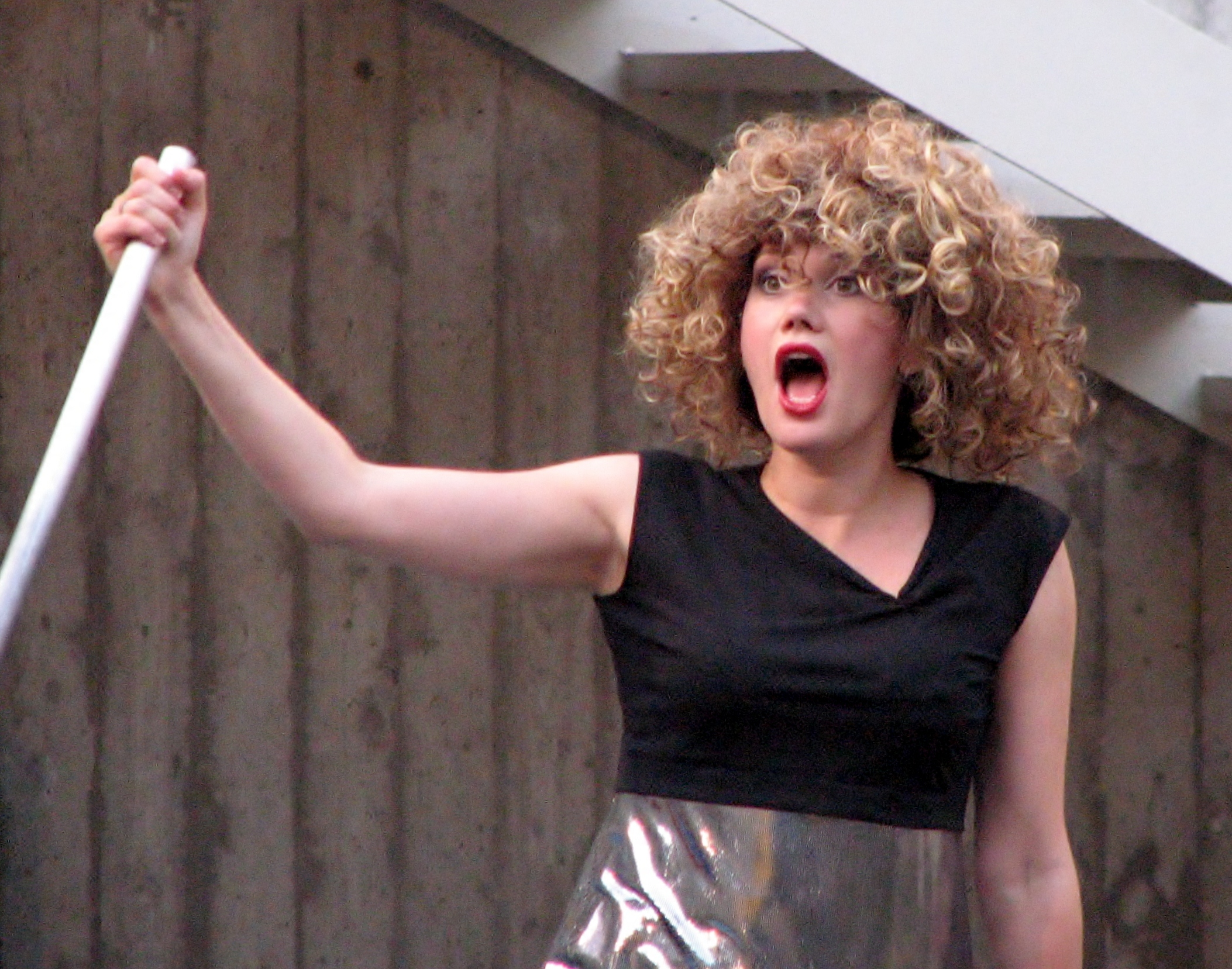
- Elisabet Reinsalu in costume, performing onstage.
- Born: Elisabet Tamm; 21 April 1976 (age 50); Tallinn, then part of Estonian SSR, Soviet Union
- Occupation: Actress
- Years active: 1991–present
- Spouse: Ardo Reinsalu
- Children: 2
- Parent(s): Mari Lill; Tõnu Tamm
- Relatives: Ivo Lill (maternal uncle)

Elisabet Reinsalu (until 2012, Elisabet Tamm; born 21 April 1976) is an Estonian stage, television, voice, and film actress.

== Early life and education ==
Elisabet Reinsalu was born Elisabet Tamm in Tallinn to Tõnu Tamm and Mari Lill, both actors. She has an older sister named Katariina. Her maternal uncle is glass artist Ivo Lill.

Tamm graduated from secondary school in 1994 from Tallinn Õismäe Humanitarian Gymnasium. She spent three years studying advertising and media at Tallinn Pedagogical University (now, Tallinn University) before entering the Estonian Academy of Music and Theatre's Drama School, graduating in 2002. Among her graduating classmates were Priit Võigemast, Ott Aardam, Hele Kõrve, Karin Rask, Mart Toome, Evelin Võigemast, Maria Soomets, and Argo Aadli.

== Stage career ==
Following graduation, Elisabet Tamm joined the Tallinn City Theatre in 2002; where she is still presently engaged. She made her stage debut while still a student in the role of Edith in a 2000 production of Mark Twain's 1881 novel The Prince and the Pauper. Her stage debut as an actress engaged at the theatre was in the role of Catherine in a 2002 production of David Auburn's 2000 play Proof. Other notable stage appearances include roles in productions by authors and playwrights such as: Alexandre Dumas, Jaan Tätte, A. H. Tammsaare, William Butler Yeats, Luigi Pirandello, Carlo Gozzi, Jón Atli Jónasson, and J. B. Priestley.

== Film career ==
Tamm made her film debut at age 15 in 1991 as Rita in the Roman Baskin directed drama Rahu tänav for Tallinnfilm, starring Mikk Mikiver and Jüri Järvet. Following this role, she returned to her studies and didn't appear in another film until receiving a small roll in the 2002 Elmo Nüganen directed historical drama Nimed marmortahvlil, adapted from the 1936 Albert Kivikas novel of the same name about the 1918–1920 Estonian War of Independence. In 2006, she played the role of Ottilie in the Roman Baskin directed Vana daami visiit; based on 1956 tragicomic play The Visit by Swiss dramatist Friedrich Dürrenmatt, and starring Ita Ever and Aarne Üksküla.

Other small film roles include, the Marko Raat directed Agent Sinikael in 2002; the Mart Arjukese directed film short Viimane öö in 2003; as a voice actress in the Hardi Volmer directed animated film short Barbarid in 2003; in the 2005 Leeni Linna directed dramatic short film Personal Space; and the Sander Allikmäe directed dramatic short film Kastis in 2012.

In addition to film roles, she has also had a career as a voice actress; often dubbing foreign animated film characters into Estonian. She has voiced the characters Colette Tatou in Pixar's 2007 American animated comedy film Ratatouille; Vanellope von Schweetz in the American animated fantasy-comedy film Wreck-It Ralph, produced by Walt Disney Animation Studios; and Maggie in the 2013 animated fantasy-comedy film The House of Magic, among others.

== Television career ==
Tamm's first prominent television role as an actress was as Rita Leidpalu in the 2006–2007 ETV crime drama serial Ohtlik lend. In 2008, she appeared in the role of Helmi Reiman in the ETV twelve-part television historical mini-series Tuulepealne maa, which focused on the pre-World War II history of Estonia, its birth as a country, the Estonian War of Independence, post-war life throughout 1920 up to 1941 and World War II.

Since 2010, she has appeared as Mari Murakas in the popular Kanal 2 drama series Pilvede all. In 2013, she played a central character named Vivian in the TV3 drama series Kartulid ja apelsinid.

== Personal life ==
In 2012, Elisabet Tamm married Ardo Reinsalu. The couple had been in a long-term relationship and have two children; a daughter, born in 2004; and a son, born in 2008. Since 2012, she has used her married surname Reinsalu.
