= Ott Aardam =

Estonian actor (born 1980)

- Born: 1 July 1980 (age 45); Orissaare, Saare County, then part of Estonian SSR, Soviet Union
- Occupation: Actor
- Years active: 2002–present
- Spouse: Laura Peterson
- Children: 3

Ott Aardam (born 1 July 1980) is an Estonian stage, television, and film actor.

== Early life ==
Born and raised in Orissaare on the island of Saaremaa, he graduated from primary school in 1995 from Orissaare Gymnasium. In 1998, he graduated from secondary school from Saaremaa Gymnasium. Afterward, he moved to Tallinn and attended the Estonian Academy of Music and Theatre Drama School (now, the Estonian Academy of Music and Theatre), studying under drama teacher and actor Elmo Nüganen, and graduating in 2002. Among his graduating classmates were Priit Võigemast, Karin Rask, Maria Soomets, Hele Kõre, Mart Toome, Evelin Võigemast, Elisabet Reinsalu, and Argo Aadli.

== Acting career ==
In 2002, shortly after graduation, Ott Aardam began an engagement as an actor at the Ugala theatre in Viljandi. He would work in this capacity until 2008. In April 2014, he began working as the Ugala theatre's creative director.

Aardam made his film debut in the 2002 Elmo Nüganen directed drama Nimed marmortahvlil (English: Names in Marble), based on the novel of the same name penned by Albert Kivikas in 1936 about the Estonian War of Independence fought in 1918–1920. This was followed by a role in the joint Estonian-Finnish comedy Kinnunen in 2007. In 2015, he appeared in the Margus Paju directed adventure film Supilinna Salaselts, and in 2016 in the Triin Ruumet directed black comedy Päevad, mis ajasid segadusse. In 2017, he appeared in the Priit Pääsuke-directed drama Keti lõpp.

Since 2003, he has had a recurring role as Jaanus on the popular, long-running ETV series Õnne 13. He has also made appearances as an actor in other television programs such as Kättemaksukontor and Viimane võmm.

== Personal life ==
Aardam is married to actress Laura Peterson and they have three children.
