= Mart Toome =

Estonian theater, film, and television actor (born 1980)

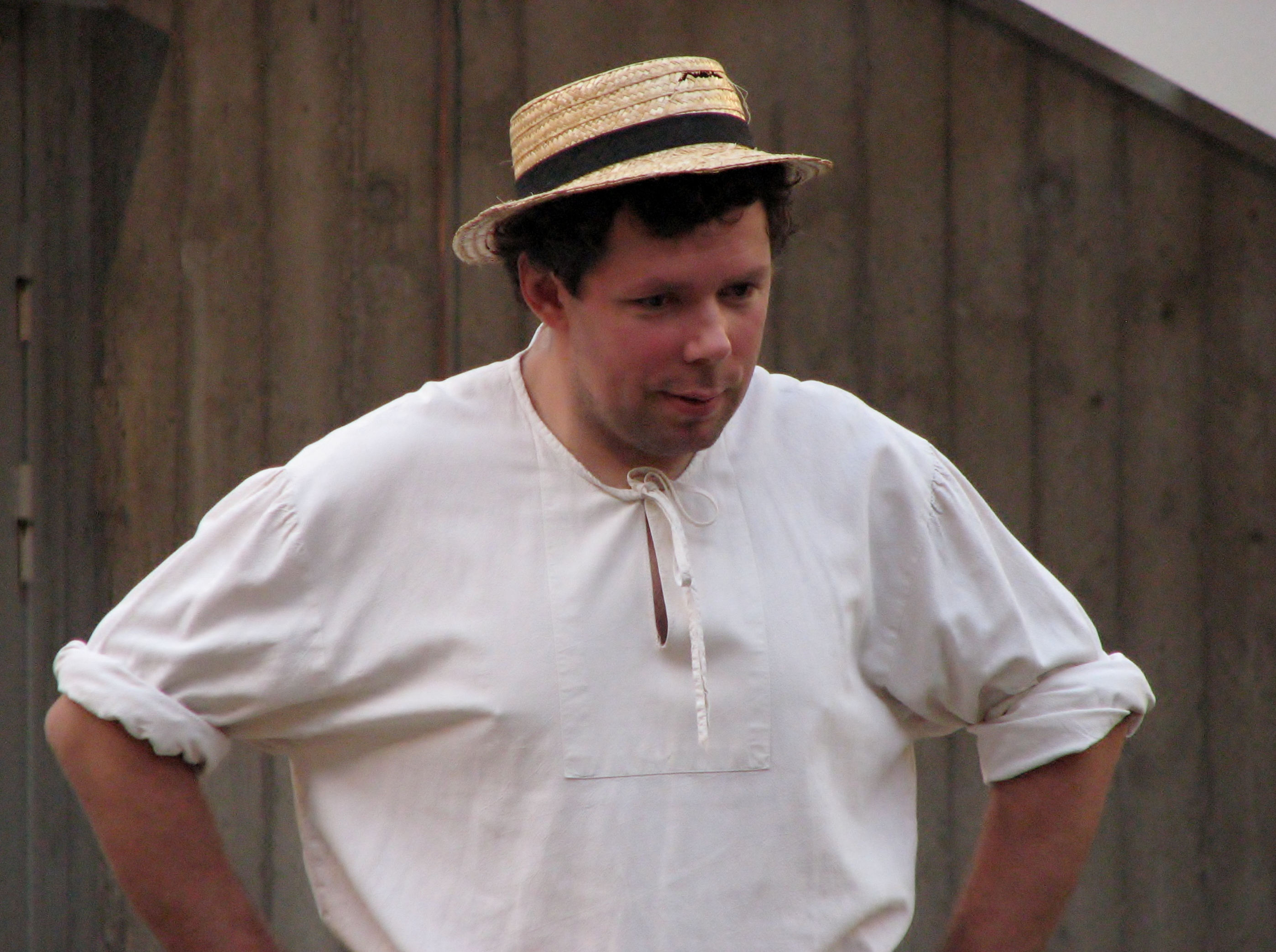
- Toome in 2012
- Born: 7 March 1980 (age 46); Enge, then part of Estonian SSR, Soviet Union
- Occupation: Actor
- Years active: 2002–present
- Children: 2

Mart Toome (born 7 March 1980) is an Estonian stage, television, and film actor.

== Early life and education ==
Mart Toome was born Enge, Halinga Parish, in Pärnu County in 1980. He is a 2002 graduate of the EMA Higher Drama School (now the Estonian Academy of Music and Theatre) in Tallinn under direction of actor, director and theatre pedagogue Elmo Nüganen. Among his graduating classmates were actors: Elisabet Reinsalu, Priit Võigemast, Ott Aardam, Hele Kõrve, Karin Rask, Evelin Võigemast, Maria Soomets, and Argo Aadli.

== Career ==
=== Stage ===
Shortly following his graduation from the EMA Higher Drama School in 2002, Mart Toome began an engagement as an actor at the Tallinn City Theatre, where he is still currently employed. Some of his most memorable roles since joining the Tallinn City Theatre include those in stage productions by such varied international playwrights and authors as: Shakespeare, Dostoyevsky, Yeats, Dumas, Chekhov, Steinbeck, Waugh, Ferenc Molnár, Aleksey Nikolayevich Tolstoy, David Mamet, Sławomir Mrożek, Carlo Gozzi, Ann Jellicoe, Tennessee Williams, J. B. Priestley, and Otfried Preußler, among others. Among his more memorable performances in roles by Estonian playwrights and authors include those of: Eduard Vilde, A. H. Tammsaare, Jaan Tätte, Diana Leesalu, and Paavo Piik.

Toome has also appeared in productions at a number of other theatres, including the Estonian Drama Theatre, the MTÜ Look, the Kalevipoeg Summer Theatre, the R.A.A.A.M. theatre, the MTÜ Kell Kümme, the Vanalinnastuudio, and the Estonian Puppet and Youth Theatre (NUKU).

=== Television ===
Mart Toome made his television debut on an episode of the TV3 drama series Kodu keset linna in 2003. This was followed by another small role on the Eesti Televisioon (ETV) children's television series Buratino tegutseb jälle the same year. In 2006, Toome appeared in the role of Taavi on an episode of the ETV crime-drama series Ohtlik lend. Toome has also made appearances on several other Estonian television series, including the Kanal 2 crime-drama Kelgukoerad in 2007 and again in 2010, on the popular TV3 comedy-crime series Kättemaksukontor in 2010 and 2015, and a 2015 appearance on the Kanal 2 crime-drama series Viimane võmm. In 2017, he hosted the comedic game show Peitusemeistrid on Kanal 2.

In 2014, Toome joined the cast, in a starring role, of the Kanal 2 comedy series Parim enne as Doctor Mart. In 2015, Toome appeared as Sten on the Kanal 2 comedy series Takso, starring Jan Uuspõld. Toome took Ardo Ran Varres's place in the Estonian language dubbing of the Nickelodeon animated television series SpongeBob SquarePants, or Käsna-Kalle Kantpüks, starting with the show's seventh season.

=== Film ===
Toome's feature film debut was in the role of Miljan in the 2002 Elmo Nüganen directed period war film Nimed marmortahvlil for Taska Film. The film was an adaptation of the 1936 Albert Kivikas penned novel of the same name chronicling students in Tartu who enlist to fight in the 1918–1920 Estonian War of Independence. In 2005, he appeared in a small role in the Peeter Urbla directed comedy-drama Stiilipidu for Exitfilm about three women (played by Maarja Jakobson, Anne Reemann, and Evelin Võigemast) who lose their jobs and open a costume rental business.

== Personal life ==
Mart Toome is in a long-term relationship with Aveli Kadastik. The couple have two children; a daughter Marta born in October 2010, and a younger son. They currently reside in Tallinn.
