= Hele Kõrve =

Estonian actress and singer

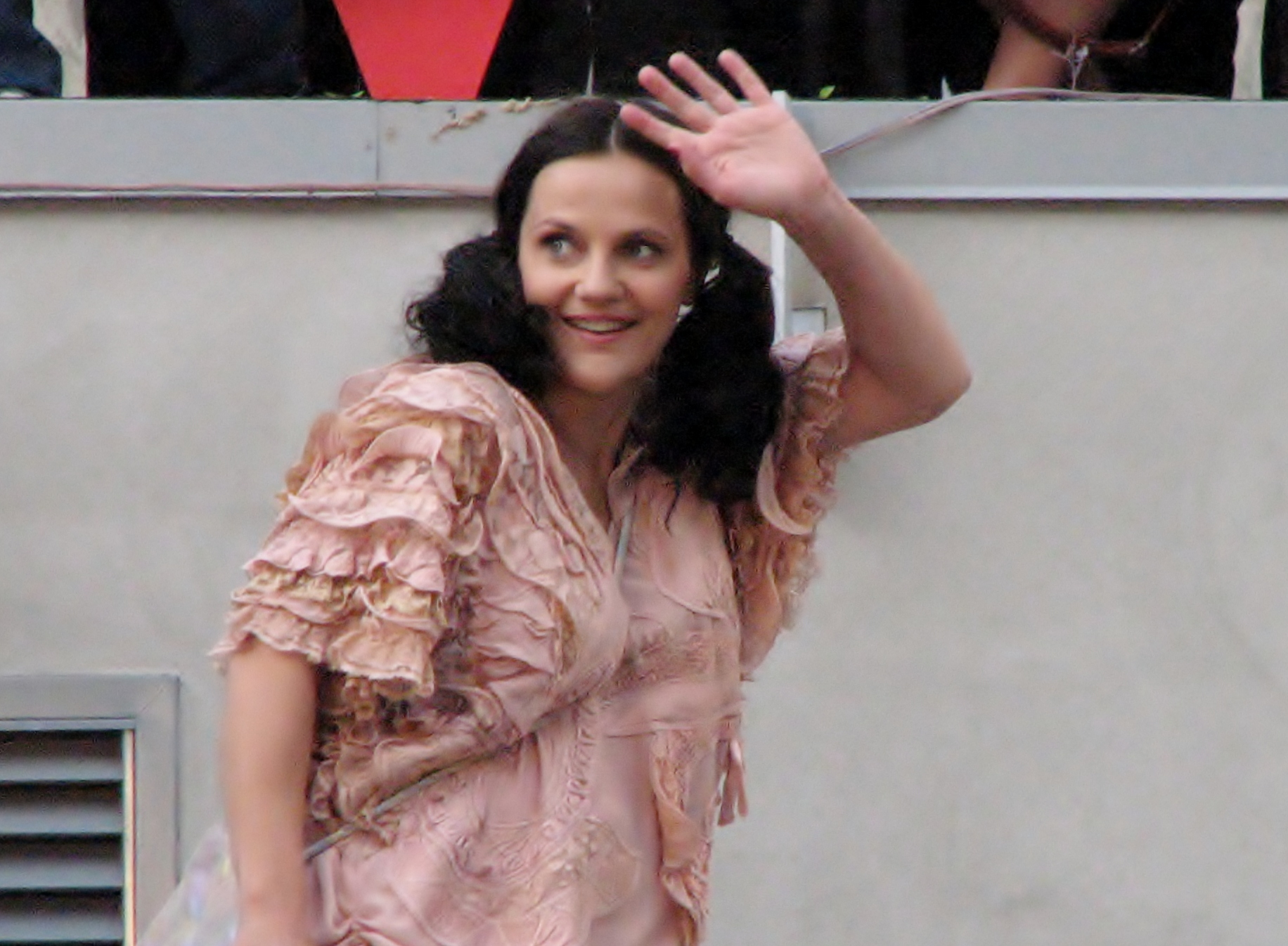
- Born: Hele Kõre; 7 January 1980 (age 46); Jõgeva, then part of Estonian SSR, Soviet Union
- Occupations: Actress, singer
- Years active: 2000–present
- Spouse: Alo Kõrve (2009 – present)
- Children: 2

Hele Kõrve (until 2009, Hele Kõre; born 7 January 1980) is an Estonian stage, television, film and voice actress and singer.

== Early life and education ==
Hele Kõrve was born Hele Kõre in 1980 in the town of Jõgeva, in Jõgeva County. She graduated from secondary school at the Jõgeva Gymnasium in 1998. Afterward, she studied acting at the Estonian Academy of Music and Theatre, graduating in 2002. Among her graduating classmates were Priit Võigemast, Ott Aardam, Maria Soomets, Karin Rask, Mart Toome, Evelin Võigemast, Elisabet Reinsalu, and Argo Aadli.

== Stage career ==
In 2002, she began an engagement as an actress at the Tallinn City Theatre, where she still performs. She has appeared in roles at the Tallinn City Theatre in works by such varied authors and playwrights as: Shakespeare, Chekhov, Dumas, Tiago Rodrigues, A. H. Tammsaare, Evelyn Waugh, Aleksey Nikolayevich Tolstoy, David Storey, Richard Kalinoski and Jaan Tätte, among others.

Additionally, she has appeared in productions at the Estonian National Opera and the NUKU Theatre in Tallinn.

== Film ==
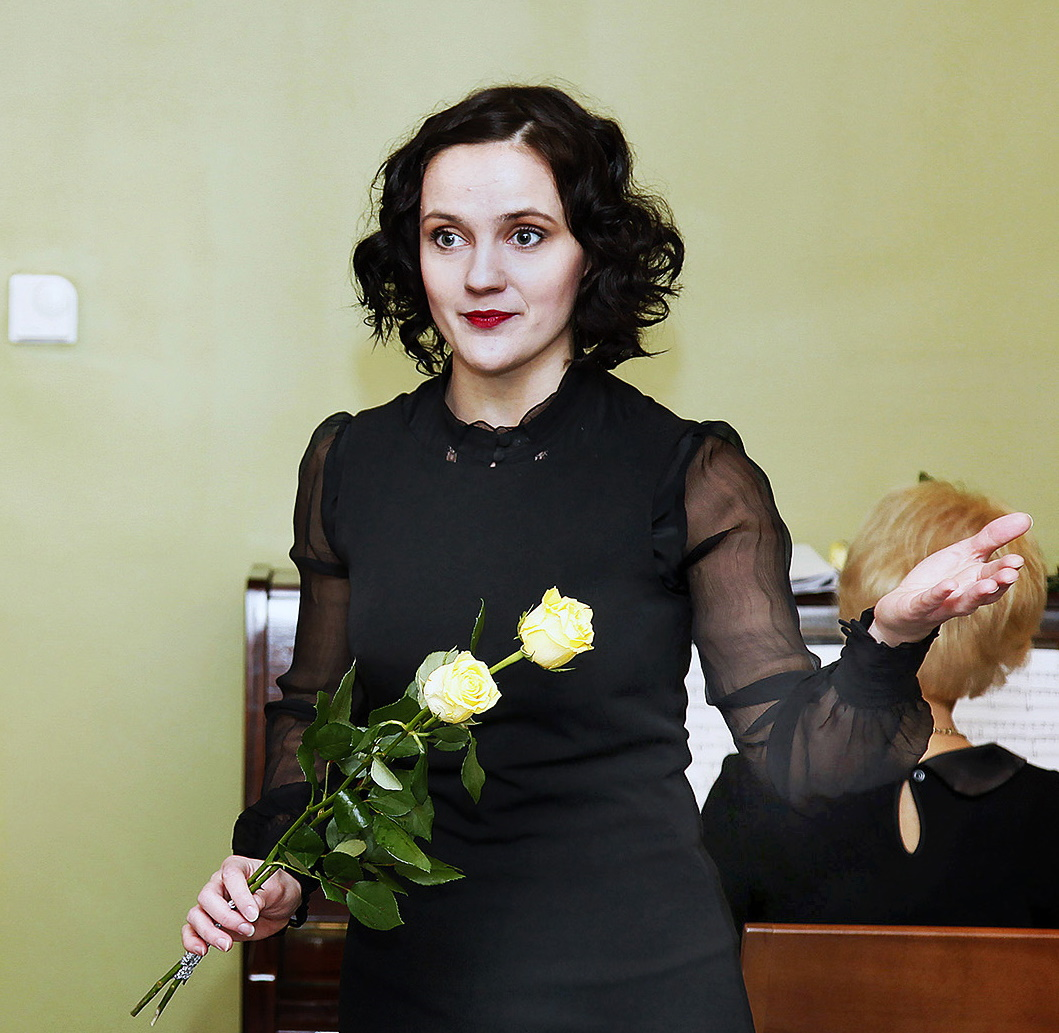
Kõrve in 2008

Kõrve (then using her maiden name Hele Kõre) made her film debut in a starring role as Marta in the 2002 Elmo Nüganen-directed Nimed marmortahvlil (English release titles: Names in Marble and Names Engraved in Marble) opposite actors Priit Võigemast, Indrek Sammul and future husband Alo Kõrve. The film was based on the novel of the same name by author Albert Kivikas about the Estonian War of Independence. This was followed by the role of Marion in the 2005 Andrus Tuisk directed horror short film Ukse taga. Other prominent film roles include Helen Tamm in the Dirk Hoyer-directed crime-drama Võõras, starring Tanel Padar; Renita, in the 2005 René Vilbre directed crime-drama Mina olin siin, based on the novel Mina olin siin. Esimene arest by Sass Henno; and a small role in the 2011 Andres Puustusmaa-directed crime-drama Rotilõks. In 2017, she appeared in the Puustusmaa directed film Rohelised kassid.

In 2007, she provided the singing voice for the role of Asta Ots, wife of Estonian tenor Georg Ots, in the Peeter Simm-directed biopic film Georg. Russian actress Anastasiya Makeyeva played the speaking role of Asta Ots.

Kõrve has also worked as voice actress; most notably, dubbing several foreign animated films into the Estonian language. In 2013, she provided the Estonian voice of Merida, the main character from the 2012 Disney Pixar film Brave. In 2014, she was both the speaking and singing voice of Anna in the Walt Disney Animation Studios' animated film Frozen. The film's songs "For the First Time in Forever", translated into Estonian and sang as "Esmakordselt ajameres", and "Love Is an Open Door" as "Armastus muudab kõik" were both sung by Kõrve.

In 2020, she appeared alongside her husband as the character Edith Parik in the Margus Paju directed World War II spy drama O2. IN 2022, she appeared as Else in the Elmo Nüganen directed historical mystery thriller Apteeker Melchior: Timuka tütar alongside her husband, Alo Kõrve.

== Television ==
As Hele Kõre, she made her television debut in the ETV children's series Buratino tegutseb jälle in 2003. In 2005, she appeared as Anneli in the Ilmar Raag directed television movie August 1991, which focused on the 1991 Soviet coup d'état attempt that brought the Soviet military onto the streets of Estonia in an effort to quell the Estonian pro-independence movement.

In 2008, she would appear as the character Iivi Liivet-Kallaste in the ETV twelve-part television mini-series Tuulepealne maa (Windward Land) which chronicled the pre-World War II history of Estonia, its birth as a country, the 1918-1920 Estonian War of Independence, post-war life throughout 1920 up to 1941 and World War II.

Kõrve is possibly most well-known from television as the character of Merilin on the long-running ETV drama Õnne 13, which she has appeared on since 2007.

In 2011, she co-hosted (along with Evelin Võigemast) a season of Eesti otsib superstaari (Estonia is Searching for a Superstar) on TV3; the Estonian version of the British talent show Pop Idol.

Since 2015, Kõrve has appeared as the character Veera Jõesaar in the ETV drama series Mustad lesed. In 2017, she was a contestant on TV3's Su nägu kõlab tuttavalt, the Estonian version of Your Face Sounds Familiar, an interactive reality television franchise series where celebrity contestants impersonate singers. Kõrve's impersonations included Elina Born, Alice Cooper, Montserrat Caballé, Koit Toome, Jennifer Lopez, Minnie Riperton, and Europe, among others. Kõrve ultimately finished in second place behind composer and singer Valter Soosalu.

== Music ==
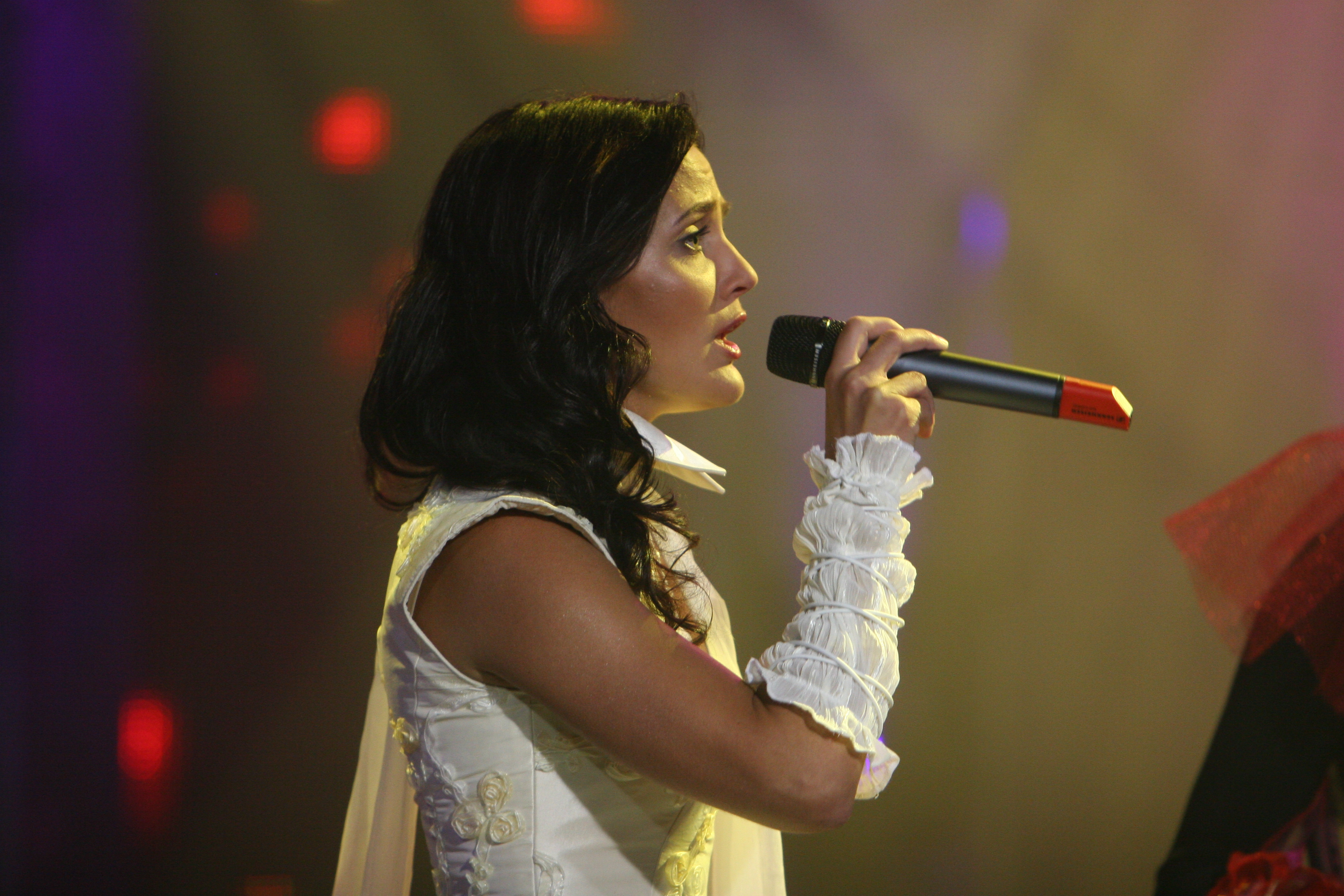
Hele Kõre performing at Eurolaul in 2007.

In 2006, Hele Kõre and Kristjan Kasearu recorded a duet, "Siis, kui maailm magab veel" ("When the World is Still Sleeping") for the rock musical Romeo & Julia, written by the Estonian band Terminaator. The band later wrote the eponymously titled track "Romeo & Julia" for inclusion in the musical. Hele Kõre and Kasearu would perform the song in 2007 as an entry for Eurolaul, the annual televised competition to select a song to represent Estonia in the Eurovision Song Contest. However, the song placed second, behind Gerli Padar's entry "Partners in Crime".

Kõre also provided vocals for Estonian industrial-metal band No-Big-Silence albums Kuidas kuningas kuu peale kippus in 2004 and War in Wonderland in 2006.

== Personal life ==
Hele Kõre married actor Alo Kõrve in June 2009. They have two daughters; Roosi, born in 2009 and Kirsi, born in 2012. The family reside in Üksnurme, Harju County, near Tallinn. Since 2009, Kõre has used her married surname Kõrve.
