= 1980 in film =

The following is an overview of events in 1980 in film, including the highest-grossing films, award ceremonies and festivals, a list of films released and notable deaths.

== Highest-grossing films (U.S.) ==
The top ten 1980 released films by box office gross in North America are as follows:

Highest-grossing films of 1980
Rank	Title	Distributor	Box-office gross
1	The Empire Strikes Back	20th Century Fox	$209,398,025
2	9 to 5	20th Century Fox	$103,290,500
3	Stir Crazy	Columbia	$101,300,000
4	Airplane!	Paramount	$83,453,539
5	Any Which Way You Can	Warner Bros.	$70,687,344
6	Private Benjamin	Warner Bros.	$69,847,348
7	Coal Miner's Daughter	Universal	$67,182,787
8	Smokey and the Bandit II	Universal	$66,132,626
9	The Blue Lagoon	Columbia	$58,853,106
10	The Blues Brothers	Universal	$57,229,890

== Worldwide gross revenue ==
The following table lists known worldwide gross revenue figures for several high-grossing films that originally released in 1980. Note that this list is incomplete and is therefore not representative of the highest-grossing films worldwide in 1980.

Title	Gross	Source	Country
The Empire Strikes Back	$538,375,067		United States
The Gods Must Be Crazy	$200,000,000		South Africa
Airplane!	$130,000,000		United States
The Blues Brothers	$115,229,890		United States

== Events ==
- April 29 – Sir Alfred Hitchcock, known as "The Master of Suspense", dies at his home in Bel Air, California, at the age of 80.
- May 21 – The Empire Strikes Back is released and is the highest-grossing film of the year (just as its predecessor, Star Wars, was three years prior).
- June 9 – Richard Pryor sets himself on fire while free-basing cocaine and drinking 151-proof rum. Pryor ran down his street in Northridge, California, until subdued by police.
- June 20 – The Blues Brothers is released, and in addition to becoming one of the top-grossing films of the year, it also became the first feature film to be based on characters created on Saturday Night Live.
- June 23 – Filming begins on George Lucas and Steven Spielberg's first Indiana Jones film Raiders of the Lost Ark.
- August 13 – Pacific Data Images is founded by Carl Rosendahl.
- November 4 – Former Screen Actors Guild president and film actor Ronald Reagan wins the 1980 United States presidential election in a landslide victory.
- November 7- Legendary actor Steve McQueen dies at the age of 50 after surgery to remove tumours in his neck after previously being diagnosed with lung cancer.
- November 19 – Heaven's Gate becomes one of the biggest box office bombs of all-time and its colossal failure bankrupts United Artists.
- Allied Artists is sold to Lorimar Productions.

== Context ==
Industry professionals predicted comedy films and upbeat entertainment to dominate theaters in 1980. This was a response to poor morale in a nation suffering through economic recession, which generally increased theatrical visits as audiences sought escapism and ignored romantic films and depictions of blue-collar life. The financial success and low production cost of comedies such as Blazing Saddles (1974) and Animal House (1978), had further driven demand for comedies; Airplane!, The Blues Brothers, Caddyshack, and The Jerk, were all scheduled for release that year. The average cost of making films had risen to $6 million which had reduced the number of films being made for niche audiences. Some studios continued to release a wide variety of films, hoping that a few significant successes would compensate for other failures.

A surge of interest in science-fiction following Star Wars' release had led to many low-budget entries in the genre attempting to profit by association, and big budget entries such as Star Trek: The Motion Picture and The Black Hole, both of which were released in late 1979, just months before The Empire Strikes Back.

== Awards ==
Category/Organization	38th Golden Globe Awards January 31, 1981		34th BAFTA Awards March 22, 1981	53rd Academy Awards March 31, 1981
Category/Organization	Drama	Musical or Comedy	34th BAFTA Awards March 22, 1981	53rd Academy Awards March 31, 1981
Best Film	Ordinary People	Coal Miner's Daughter	The Elephant Man	Ordinary People
Best Director	Robert Redford; Ordinary People		Akira Kurosawa; Kagemusha	Robert Redford; Ordinary People
Best Actor	Robert De Niro; Raging Bull	Ray Sharkey; The Idolmaker	John Hurt; The Elephant Man	Robert De Niro; Raging Bull
Best Actress	Mary Tyler Moore; Ordinary People	Sissy Spacek; Coal Miner's Daughter	Judy Davis; My Brilliant Career	Sissy Spacek; Coal Miner's Daughter
Best Supporting Actor	Timothy Hutton; Ordinary People		N/A	Timothy Hutton; Ordinary People
Best Supporting Actress	Mary Steenburgen; Melvin and Howard		N/A	Mary Steenburgen; Melvin and Howard
Best Screenplay, Adapted	William Peter Blatty; The Ninth Configuration		Jerzy Kosinski; Being There	Alvin Sargent; Ordinary People
Best Screenplay, Original	William Peter Blatty; The Ninth Configuration		Jerzy Kosinski; Being There	Bo Goldman; Melvin and Howard
Best Original Score	Dominic Frontiere; The Stunt Man		John Williams; The Empire Strikes Back	Michael Gore; Fame
Best Original Song	"Fame"; Fame		N/A	"Fame"; Fame
Best Foreign Language Film	Tess		N/A	Moscow Does Not Believe in Tears
Best Documentary	N/A	N/A	N/A	From Mao to Mozart: Isaac Stern in China

Palme d'Or (Cannes Film Festival):

All That Jazz, directed by Bob Fosse, United States
Kagemusha, 影武者 (Shadow Warrior), directed by Akira Kurosawa, Japan

Golden Lion (Venice Film Festival):

Atlantic City, directed by Louis Malle, US / Canada / France
Gloria, directed by John Cassavetes, United States

Golden Bear (Berlin Film Festival):

Heartland, directed by Richard Pearce, United States
Palermo or Wolfsburg (Palermo oder Wolfsburg), directed by Werner Schroeter, West Germany

People's Choice Award (Toronto International Film Festival):

Bad Timing, directed by Nicolas Roeg, United Kingdom

== Births ==
- January 2 - David Gyasi, British actor
- January 4
  - June Diane Raphael, American actress and comedian
  - D'Arcy Carden, American actress and comedian
  - Greg Cipes, voice actor
- January 7
  - Hele Kõrve, Estonian actress and singer
  - Simon Woods, English actor and writer
- January 8
  - Sam Riley, English actor and singer
- January 10
  - Katie Dippold, American actress, writer and screenwriter
  - Sarah Shahi, American actress and former model
- January 16 – Lin-Manuel Miranda, American singer-songwriter and actor
- January 17 – Zooey Deschanel, American singer-songwriter and actress
- January 18
  - Estelle, British singer, songwriter, record producer and actress
  - Jason Segel, American actor, comedian, screenwriter, singer, songwriter, author and producer
- January 19 – Luke Macfarlane, American actor
- January 21
  - Nana Mizuki, Japanese singer and voice actress
  - Kim Sharma, Indian actress
- January 22 - Christopher Masterson, American actor
- January 29
  - Joe MacLeod, Canadian actor and television host
  - Jason James Richter, American actor and musician
- January 30 – Wilmer Valderrama, American actor
- February 2 – Zhang Jingchu, Chinese actress
- February 3 - Ben Turner, British-Iranian actor
- February 6 - Ben Lawson, Australian actor
- February 8
  - William Jackson Harper, American actor
  - Sinead Matthews, English actress
- February 9 - Margarita Levieva, Russian-American actress
- February 11 – Matthew Lawrence, American actor
- February 12
  - Christina Ricci, American actress
  - Enver Gjokaj, American actor
  - Sarah Lancaster, American actress
- February 14 – Michelle Ye, Hong Kong actress and producer
- February 17 - Jason Ritter, American actor, voice actor and producer
- February 21
  - Justin Roiland, American voice actor, animator, writer, and producer
  - Brendan Sexton III, American actor
- February 25
  - Chris Knowings, American actor
  - Christy Knowings, American actress and comedian (died 2026)
  - Rashaan Nall, American writer, director, screenwriter and actor
- February 26
  - Jóhannes Haukur Jóhannesson, Icelandic actor
  - Georgia Taylor, English actor
- February 27 - Stephen Wight, English actor
- February 28
  - Denise Gough, Irish actress
  - Charles Halford, American actor
- February 29
  - Steven Cree, Scottish actor
  - Peter Scanavino, American actor
- March 2 - Rebel Wilson, Australian actress, comedian, writer and producer
- March 3
  - Meiling Melançon, American actress and screenwriter
  - Katherine Waterston, American actress
- March 5 - Jessica Boehrs, German actress and singer
- March 7
  - Laura Prepon, American actress
  - Mart Toome, Estonian actor
- March 9 – Matthew Gray Gubler, American actor
- March 13 - Nathan Phillips, Australian actor
- March 17 - Katie Morgan, American pornographic actress
- March 18 - Sophia Myles, English actress
- March 20 - Mikey Day, American actor and comedian
- March 23 - Itay Tiran, Israeli actor and director
- March 25 - Tinsel Korey, Canadian actress and singer-songwriter
- March 29 - Kim Tae-hee, South Korean actress
- March 30 - Fiona Gubelmann, American actress
- March 31
  - Christine Barger, American actress
  - Kate Micucci, American actress
  - Maaya Sakamoto, Japanese singer and voice actress
- April 4 - Collette Wolfe, American actress
- April 8
  - Carrie Savage, American voice actress
  - Katee Sackhoff, American actress
- April 10
  - Sean Avery, Canadian actor
  - Charlie Hunnam, British actor and screenwriter
- April 11 - Julia Chantrey, Canadian actress
- April 13
  - Colleen Clinkenbeard, American voice actress
  - Kelli Giddish, American actress
- April 14
  - Tom Franco, American actor
  - Claire Coffee, American actress
- April 15 - Arian Moayed, Iranian-born American actor, writer and director
- April 17
  - Nicholas D'Agosto, American actor
  - Samantha Soule, American actress
- April 21 - Hadley Fraser, English actor and singer
- April 22 - Rodrigo Hilbert, Brazilian television presenter, actor, and former model
- April 24 - Reagan Gomez-Preston, American actress
- April 25
  - Daniel MacPherson, Australian actor and television presenter
  - Céline Sallette, French actress
- April 26
  - Jordana Brewster, American actress
  - Anna Mucha, Polish actress
  - Marnette Patterson, American actress
  - Channing Tatum, American actor
  - Damien Dante Wayans, American actor, screenwriter, producer and director
- April 30 - Sam Heughan, Scottish actor
- May 2 - Ellie Kemper, American actress and comedian
- May 5 - Zach McGowan, American actor
- May 8
  - Jasen Fisher, American former child actor
  - Kimberlee Peterson, American actress
- May 14 - Sérgio Guizé, Brazilian actor
- May 18 - Matt Long, American actor
- May 19 - Chris Jarvis, English actor
- May 20 - Cauã Reymond, Brazilian actor
- May 22
  - Nazanin Boniadi, British actress
  - Lucy Gordon, English actress and model (died 2009)
  - Evelin Võigemast, Estonian actress
- May 23
  - D. J. Cotrona, American actor
  - Lane Garrison, American actor
  - Chris Gethard, American actor, comedian and writer
- May 25 - Will Janowitz, American actor
- May 27 - Ben Feldman, American actor and producer
- May 28 - Kelly Fremon Craig, American screenwriter, producer and director
- May 29 - Adam Brown, English actor and comedian
- June 1 - Oliver James, English musician and former actor
- June 3 - Billy Slaughter, American actor
- June 6 - Elliot Villar, American actor
- June 10 - Jessica DiCicco, American film, television and voice actress
- June 15 - Candace Brown, American actress and comedian
- June 16 – Sibel Kekilli, German actress
- June 18 - David Giuntoli, American actor
- June 19
  - Neil Brown Jr., American actor
  - Lauren Lee Smith, Canadian actress
- June 20 - Tika Sumpter, American actress, singer, producer, television host and model
- June 21
  - Preeya Kalidas, British singer and actress
  - Wanuri Kahiu, Kenyan film director, producer, and author
- June 22 - Javone Prince, British comedian and actor
- June 23
  - Heath Freeman, American actor (died 2021)
  - Melissa Rauch, American actress and comedian
- June 24 – Minka Kelly, American actress
- June 26 - Jason Schwartzman, American actor, producer and musician
- July 1 - Fortune Feimster, American comedian
- July 3 – Olivia Munn, American actress
- July 4 - Max Elliott Slade, American former child actor
- July 6 – Eva Green, French actress
- July 7 - Marika Domińczyk, Polish-American actress
- July 10
  - James Rolfe, American filmmaker, actor, YouTuber and online personality
  - Jessica Simpson, American singer and actress
  - Thomas Ian Nicholas, American actor
  - Aaron Staton, American actor
- July 12
  - Kristen Connolly, American actress
  - Mylène Jampanoï, French actress
  - Tom Price, Welsh actor and comedian
- July 15 – Jasper Pääkkönen, Finnish actor and film producer
- July 17 – Brett Goldstein, British actor and comedian
- July 18 – Kristen Bell, American actress
- July 19
  - Mark Webber, American actor, screenwriter and director
  - Chris Sullivan, American actor
- July 27 - Ewen Leslie, Australian actor
- July 29 - Rachel Miner, American actress
- July 30 - April Bowlby, American actress
- August 3
  - Hannah Simone, Canadian actress
  - Teuku Rifnu Wikana, Indonesian actor
- August 5 - Sophie Winkleman, English actress
- August 6
  - Monique Ganderton, Canadian stunt performer and actress
  - Rory Scovel, American actor and comedian
- August 8 – Marisa Quintanilla, American actress
- August 9 - Stephen Schneider, American actor
- August 10
  - Pua Magasiva, New Zealand actor (died 2019)
- August 11 - Merritt Wever, American actress
- August 12 - Dominique Swain, American actress and producer
- August 13 - Álex González, Spanish actor
- August 14 - Adrienne C. Moore, American actress
- August 15 - Natalie Press, English actress
- August 18 – Preeti Jhangiani, Indian actress
- August 19
  - Adam Campbell, English actor
  - Aaron Horvath, American animator, screenwriter, producer and director
- August 20 - Corey Carrier, American former child actor
- August 21 - John Brotherton, American actor
- August 23 - Joanne Froggatt, English actress
- August 25 – Jackie Tohn, American actress and singer
- August 26
  - Macaulay Culkin, American actor
  - Chris Pine, American actor
- August 31 - Leo Bill, English actor
- September 1 - Lara Pulver, English actress
- September 4 - Timo Tjahjanto, Indonesian filmmaker
- September 7
  - J. D. Pardo, American actor
  - Alex Hassell, English actor
- September 9 – Michelle Williams, American actress
- September 12 - Hiroyuki Sawano, Japanese music composer
- September 13 – Ben Savage, American actor
- September 13 – Cristiana Capotondi, Italian actress
- September 18 - Charity Wakefield, English actress
- September 19 - Benjamin Davies, Scottish actor
- September 21
  - Kareena Kapoor, Indian actress
  - Autumn Reeser, American actress
- September 25
  - T.I., American actor and rapper
  - Chris Owen, American actor
- September 29
  - Zachary Levi, American actor and singer
  - Chrissy Metz, American actress
- September 30 - Toni Trucks, American actress
- October 1 - Sarah Drew, American actress
- October 3 - Daniel DeSanto, Canadian actor and voice actor
- October 4
  - Nick Mohammed, English actor, comedian and writer
  - Morgan Spector, American actor
- October 6
  - David Alpay, Canadian actor, musician and producer
  - Jenny Wade, American actress
- October 8
  - Nick Cannon, American comedian, rapper and television host
  - Nathan Head, British actor
- October 14 – Ben Whishaw, English actor
- October 18
  - Erin Dean, American former actress
  - Natasha Rothwell, American writer, actress and comedian
- October 19 – Benjamin Salisbury, American actor
- October 21
  - Kim Kardashian, American media personality, model and actress
  - Lino Musella, Italian actor
- October 23 - Robert Belushi, American actor
- October 24
  - Casey Wilson, American actress and comedian
  - Monica, American singer-songwriter, producer and actress
- October 25 - Mehcad Brooks, American actor
- October 26 - Khalid Abdalla, British actor
- October 28 - Wes Ball, American film director and artist
- October 29 – Ben Foster, American actor
- October 30 - Sarah Carter, Canadian actress
- October 31
  - Samaire Armstrong, American actress
  - Eddie Kaye Thomas, American actor
- November 1 - Dani Rovira, Spanish comedian and actor
- November 2 - Kim So-yeon, South Korean actress
- November 5 - Luke Hemsworth, Australian actor
- November 8 - Brooke Lyons, American actress
- November 9 - Vanessa Lachey, American actress, fashion model and television host
- November 10 - Alberta Mayne, Canadian actress
- November 11 - Kris Swanberg, American filmmaker and actress
- November 12
  - Ryan Gosling, Canadian actor
  - Gustaf Skarsgård, Swedish actor
- November 13 - Monique Coleman, American actress
- November 17 - Stuart Stone, Canadian actor
- November 18 - Mathew Baynton, English actor, writer, comedian, singer and musician
- November 23 - Tannishtha Chatterjee, Indian actress and director
- November 29 - Jason Griffith, American actor and voice actor
- December 1 - Chriselle Almeida, Indian actress
- December 3
  - Anna Chlumsky, American actress
  - Jenna Dewan, American actress and dancer
- December 5 - Jessica Paré, Canadian actress
- December 8 - Juliette Danielle, American actress
- December 9 – Simon Helberg, American actor and comedian
- December 13 - Satoshi Tsumabuki, Japanese actor
- December 15 - Yuri Kolokolnikov, Russian actor
- December 16 - Michael Jibson, English actor, director, writer and voice over artist
- December 18
  - Christina Aguilera, American singer, songwriter, actress and television personality
  - Neil Fingleton, English actor (died 2017)
  - Kirsty Strain, Scottish actress
- December 19
  - Jake Gyllenhaal, American actor
  - Marla Sokoloff, American actress
- December 22 - Chris Carmack, American actor
- December 26 - Jared Van Snellenberg, American former actor
- December 27 - Elizabeth Rodriguez, American actress
- December 30
  - Eliza Dushku, American actress
  - Scott Haze, American actor
- December 31 – Rosanne Mulholland, Brazilian actress

== Deaths ==
Month	Date	Name	Age	Country	Profession	Notable films
January	1	Adolph Deutsch	82	US	Composer, Arranger	Oklahoma!; The Apartment
January	3	Ivan Triesault	81	Estonia	Actor	Notorious; The Bad and the Beautiful
January	14	Robert Ardrey	71	US	Screenwriter	The Three Musketeers; Khartoum
January	17	Barbara Britton	59	US	Actress	The Virginian; Captain Kidd
January	18	Cecil Beaton	76	UK	Costume Designer, Production Designer	Gigi; My Fair Lady
January	22	Iris Meredith	64	US	Actress	The Green Archer; The Spider's Web
January	23	Leonard Strong	71	US	Actor	Shane; The Naked Jungle
January	24	Lil Dagover	92	Germany	Actress	The Cabinet of Dr. Caligari; Destiny
January	24	James Poe	58	US	Screenwriter	Around the World in 80 Days; Lilies of the Field
January	27	Peppino De Filippo	76	Italy	Actor	Toto, Peppino, and the Hussy; Boccaccio '70
January	28	Erle C. Kenton	83	US	Director	House of Frankenstein; Who Done It?
January	29	Jimmy Durante	86	US	Actor, Singer	The Man Who Came to Dinner; It's a Mad, Mad, Mad, Mad World
February	1	Romolo Valli	54	Italy	Actor	The Leopard; 1900
February	3	Ray Heindorf	71	US	Composer	Yankee Doodle Dandy; The Music Man
February	9	Renée Houston	77	UK	Actress	Repulsion; The Horse's Mouth
February	13	David Janssen	48	US	Actor	The Green Berets; The Shoes of the Fisherman
February	17	Jerry Fielding	57	US	Composer	The Wild Bunch; The Outlaw Josey Wales
February	17	Ed Graves	62	US	Art Director	Doctor Dolittle; Our Man Flint
February	18	Gale Robbins	58	US	Actress, Singer	Calamity Jane; Three Little Words
February	26	Mario Mattoli	81	Italy	Director, Screenwriter	Funniest Show on Earth; Imputato, alzatevi!
February	27	George Tobias	78	US	Actor	The Glenn Miller Story; Sergeant York
March	5	Jay Silverheels	67	Canada	Actor	The Lone Ranger; One Little Indian
March	8	Frank McDonald	80	US	Director	Isle of Fury; In Old Missouri
March	17	Farciot Edouart	85	US	Special Effects Artist	Double Indemnity; Vertigo
March	27	Philip W. Anderson	64	US	Film Editor	Giant; The Parent Trap
March	27	Steve Fisher	67	US	Screenwriter	Dead Reckoning; Lady in the Lake
March	28	Dick Haymes	61	Argentina	Actor, Singer	One Touch of Venus; State Fair
March	30	David Sharpe	70	US	Stuntman, Actor	Dick Tracy Returns; Trail Riders
April	3	Mary McCarty	56	US	Actress	The French Line; All That Jazz
April	6	John Collier	78	UK	Screenwriter	Deception; The War Lord
April	9	Kathleen Burke	66	US	Actress	Island of Lost Souls; The Lives of a Bengal Lancer
April	10	Kay Medford	65	US	Actress	Funny Girl; A Face in the Crowd
April	11	Charlotte Henry	66	US	Actress	Alice in Wonderland; Babes in Toyland
April	14	Tom Fadden	85	US	Actor	Invasion of the Body Snatchers; Flareup
April	15	Raymond Bailey	75	US	Actor	Vertigo; The Gallant Hours
April	17	Alf Sjöberg	76	Sweden	Director	Only a Mother; Wild Birds
April	19	Tony Beckley	50	UK	Actor	The Italian Job; Get Carter
April	25	Mario Bava	65	Italy	Director, Screenwriter, Cinematographer	Black Sabbath; The Whip and the Body
April	26	Cicely Courtneidge	87	Australia	Actress, Singer	Take My Tip; Under Your Hat
April	29	William Clemens	74	US	Director	The Case of the Stuttering Bishop; Calling Philo Vance
April	29	Alfred Hitchcock	80	UK	Director	Psycho; Rear Window
May	1	Henry Levin	70	US	Director	Murderers' Row; Where the Boys Are
May	1	Gene Markey	84	US	Screenwriter	On the Avenue; Luxury Liner
May	2	George Pal	72	Hungary	Producer, Director	War of the Worlds; The Time Machine
May	4	Kay Hammond	71	UK	Actress	Blithe Spirit; Five Golden Hours
May	12	Lillian Roth	69	US	Actress	Animal Crackers; Ladies They Talk About
May	14	Hugh Griffith	67	UK	Actor	Ben-Hur; Tom Jones
May	15	Gordon E. Sawyer	74	US	Sound Engineer	West Side Story; The Alamo
May	16	José Calvo	64	Spain	Actor	A Fistful of Dollars; I Giorni dell'ira
May	19	Ray Rennahan	84	US	Cinematographer	Blood and Sand; Lady in the Dark
May	21	Ida Kamińska	80	Ukraine	Actress	The Shop on Main Street; The Angel Levine
May	26	Franz Bachelin	84	Germany	Art Director	Journey to the Center of the Earth; Stalag 17
June	4	Gloria Saunders	52	US	Actress	Captive Women; Northwest Territory
June	12	Milburn Stone	75	US	Actor	Captive Wild Woman; The Judge
June	18	Terence Fisher	76	UK	Director	Dracula; The Curse of Frankenstein
June	22	Monang Carvajal	82	Philippines	Actress	Anak Dalita; The Moises Padilla Story
June	23	John Laurie	83	UK	Actor	The 39 Steps; Hobson's Choice
June	23	Odile Versois	50	France	Actress	To Paris with Love; The Young Lovers
June	24	Boris Kaufman	73	Poland	Cinematographer	On the Waterfront; 12 Angry Men
June	28	José Iturbi	84	Spain	Conductor, Actor	Anchors Aweigh; Three Daring Daughters
June	30	Thomas Browne Henry	72	US	Actor	20 Million Miles to Earth; Julius Caesar
July	6	Frank Cordell	62	UK	Composer	Cromwell; Khartoum
July	6	Gail Patrick	69	US	Actress	My Man Godfrey; My Favorite Wife
July	7	Reginald Gardiner	77	UK	Actor	The Great Dictator; The Man Who Came to Dinner
July	7	Dore Schary	74	US	Producer, Screenwriter, Executive	Boys Town; Sunrise at Campobello
July	11	Peggy Knudsen	57	US	Actress	The Big Sleep; Half Past Midnight
July	24	Peter Sellers	54	UK	Actor	Dr. Strangelove; Being There
July	30	Charles McGraw	66	US	Actor	The Narrow Margin; Spartacus
July	31	Bobby Van	51	US	Actor, Dancer	Kiss Me Kate; Lost Horizon
August	1	Strother Martin	61	US	Actor	The Wild Bunch; Butch Cassidy and the Sundance Kid
August	2	Donald Ogden Stewart	85	US	Screenwriter	The Philadelphia Story; Holiday
August	9	Elliot Nugent	83	US	Director	My Favorite Brunette; Up in Arms
August	14	Dorothy Stratten	20	Canada	Actress	Galaxina; They All Laughed
August	17	Harold Adamson	73	US	Lyricist	An Affair to Remember; Higher and Higher
August	24	Yootha Joyce	53	UK	Actress	A Man for All Seasons; George and Mildred
August	25	Gower Champion	59	US	Actor, Dancer, Director	Show Boat; Till the Clouds Roll By
August	25	Lester Dorr	87	US	Actor	Behind Prison Gates; The Shadow Returns
August	26	Tex Avery	72	US	Animator, Director	Droopy; Screwy Squirrel
August	27	Douglas Kenney	33	US	Screenwriter	Animal House; Caddyshack
September	3	Barbara O'Neil	70	US	Actress	Gone with the Wind; All This, and Heaven Too
September	4	Duncan Renaldo	76	Romania	Actor	Lady Luck; The Cisco Kid Returns
September	5	Barbara Loden	48	US	Actress, Director	Splendor in the Grass; Wanda
September	12	Lillian Randolph	81	US	Actress	It's a Wonderful Life; The Onion Field
September	17	Michael Strong	62	US	Actor	Point Blank; The Great Santini
September	19	Sol Lesser	90	US	Producer	Tarzan the Fearless; Stage Door Canteen
September	25	Lewis Milestone	84	Moldova	Director	All Quiet on the Western Front; Ocean's 11
October	6	Hattie Jacques	58	UK	Actress	Carry On; Scrooge
October	10	Billie "Buckwheat" Thomas	49	US	Actor	Our Gang; General Spanky
October	28	Leon Janney	63	US	Actor	Charly; Penrod and Sam
November	4	Noel Langley	68	South Africa	Screenwriter	The Wizard of Oz; Ivanhoe
November	7	Emilio Cigoli	70	Italy	Actor	Shoeshine; Sunday in August
November	7	Steve McQueen	50	US	Actor	The Great Escape; Papillon
November	9	Carmel Myers	81	US	Actress	All Night; Ben-Hur
November	9	Victor Sen Yung	65	US	Actor	Across the Pacific; Charlie Chan in Honolulu
November	14	Nick Dennis	76	US	Actor	A Streetcar Named Desire; Kiss Me Deadly
November	15	Bill Lee	64	US	Actor, Singer	Mary Poppins; Alice in Wonderland
November	16	Imogen Hassall	38	UK	Actress	When Dinosaurs Ruled the Earth; Toomorrow
November	22	Mae West	87	US	Actress, Screenwriter	She Done Him Wrong; I'm No Angel
November	24	Nancy Hsueh	38	US	Actress	Targets; House Calls
November	24	George Raft	79	US	Actor	Some Like It Hot; They Drive by Night
November	26	Conrad A. Nervig	91	US	Film Editor	A Tale of Two Cities; King Solomon's Mines
November	26	Rachel Roberts	53	UK	Actress	Murder on the Orient Express; Picnic at Hanging Rock
November	28	Sarah Y. Mason	84	US	Screenwriter	Little Women; Magnificent Obsession
November	29	Edith Evanson	84	US	Actress	Rope; The Big Heat
December	8	John Lennon	40	UK	Singer, Actor	A Hard Day's Night; How I Won the War
December	12	Urie McCleary	75	US	Art Director	Blossoms in the Dust; Patton
December	16	Peter Collinson	44	UK	Director	The Italian Job; And Then There Were None
December	20	Ben Sharpsteen	85	US	Director, Producer	Pinocchio; Dumbo
December	21	Marc Connelly	90	US	Actor, Screenwriter	The Spirit of St. Louis; Tall Story
December	22	Lesser Samuels	86	US	Screenwriter	No Way Out; Ace in the Hole
December	23	Memmo Carotenuto	72	Italy	Actor	Big Deal on Madonna Street; Bread, Love and Dreams
December	28	Sam Levene	75	US	Actor	Sweet Smell of Success; Brute Force
December	31	Raoul Walsh	93	US	Director, Actor	White Heat; High Sierra

== Film debuts ==
- Jay Acovone – Cruising
- Christopher Atkins – The Blue Lagoon
- James Avery – The Stunt Man
- Michael Badalucco – Raging Bull
- Adam Baldwin – My Bodyguard
- Adrienne Barbeau – The Fog
- Drew Barrymore – Altered States
- Jennifer Beals – My Bodyguard
- Fabrizio Bentivoglio – The Blue-Eyed Bandit
- Pierce Brosnan – The Long Good Friday
- Leo Burmester – Cruising
- Julie Carmen – Night of the Juggler
- Jim Carter – Flash Gordon
- Rosalind Chao – The Big Brawl
- François Cluzet – Cocktail Molotov
- Robbie Coltrane – Death Watch
- Barry Corbin – Urban Cowboy
- Tony Cox – Dr. Heckyl and Mr. Hype
- Peter Coyote – Die Laughing
- Joan Cusack – Cutting Loose
- Willem Dafoe – Heaven's Gate
- John Diehl – Falling in Love Again
- Billy Drago – Windwalker
- Michael Dudikoff – The Black Marble
- Paul Eiding – Foolin' Around
- Frankie Faison – Permanent Vacation
- Miriam Flynn – First Family
- Michael J. Fox – Midnight Madness
- Peter Gallagher – The Idolmaker
- Richard Gant – Night of the Juggler
- Serena Grandi – I'm Photogenic
- Kathy Griffin – Battle Beyond the Stars
- Michael Gross – Just Tell Me What You Want
- Julie Hagerty – Airplane!
- Tom Hanks – He Knows You're Alone
- Robert Hays – Airplane!
- Linda Hunt – Popeye
- William Hurt – Altered States
- Jeremy Irons – Nijinsky
- Bill Irwin – Popeye
- Gregory Itzin – Airplane!
- O-Lan Jones – Die Laughing
- Robert Joy – Atlantic City
- Don Lake – Don't Answer the Phone!
- Adam LeFevre – Return of the Secaucus 7
- Juliette Lewis – Bronco Billy
- Ernie Lively – It's My Turn
- William H. Macy – Somewhere in Time
- Ann Magnuson – The Long Island Four
- Michael Maloney – Richard's Things
- Sophie Marceau – La Boum
- Francis Xavier McCarthy – Altered States
- Christopher McDonald – The Hearse
- Elizabeth McGovern – Ordinary People
- Micole Mercurio – Alligator
- Cathy Moriarty – Raging Bull
- David Morse – Inside Moves
- Marshall Napier – Beyond Reasonable Doubt
- Taylor Negron – The Gong Show Movie
- Cynthia Nixon – Little Darlings
- Tom Noonan – Willie & Phil
- Richard Norton – The Octagon
- Catherine O'Hara – Nothing Personal
- Ed O'Neill – Cruising
- Terry O'Quinn – Heaven's Gate
- Michelle Pfeiffer – The Hollywood Knights
- Cindy Pickett – Night Games
- Richard Portnow – Roadie
- Harold Ramis – Caddyshack (director)
- Judge Reinhold – Running Scared
- Marco Rodríguez – The Baltimore Bullet
- Robert Romanus – Foxes
- John Rothman – Stardust Memories
- Saul Rubinek – Death Ship
- David Schofield – The Dogs of War
- Armin Shimerman – Stardust Memories
- Jean Smart – Hoodlums
- Kurtwood Smith – Roadie
- Catherine Mary Stewart – Powder Heads
- Sharon Stone – Stardust Memories
- David Strathairn – Return of the Secaucus 7
- David Suchet – Schiele in Prison
- John Turturro – Raging Bull
- Gedde Watanabe – The Long Island Four
- Hugo Weaving – ...Maybe This Time
- Dianne Wiest – It's My Turn
- Bruce Willis – The First Deadly Sin
- Jeff Wincott – Happy Birthday, Gemini
- Mare Winningham – One-Trick Pony
- John Witherspoon – The Jazz Singer
- Nicholas Woodeson – Heaven's Gate
- Sean Young – Jane Austen in Manhattan
- Lenore Zann – Hounds of Notre Dame

== See also ==
=== By country/region ===
- List of American films of 1980
- List of Argentine films of 1980
- List of Australian films of 1980
- List of Bangladeshi films of 1980
- List of British films of 1980
- List of Canadian films of 1980
- List of French films of 1980
- List of Hong Kong films of 1980
- List of Indian films of 1980
  - List of Hindi films of 1980
  - List of Kannada films of 1980
  - List of Malayalam films of 1980
  - List of Marathi films of 1980
  - List of Tamil films of 1980
  - List of Telugu films of 1980
- List of Japanese films of 1980
- List of Mexican films of 1980
- List of Pakistani films of 1980
- List of South Korean films of 1980
- List of Soviet films of 1980
- List of Spanish films of 1980

=== By genre/medium ===
- List of action films of 1980
- List of animated feature films of 1980
- List of avant-garde films of 1980
- List of comedy films of 1980
- List of drama films of 1980
- List of horror films of 1980
- List of science fiction films of 1980
- List of thriller films of 1980
- List of western films of 1980
