= Evelin Võigemast =

Estonian actress and singer

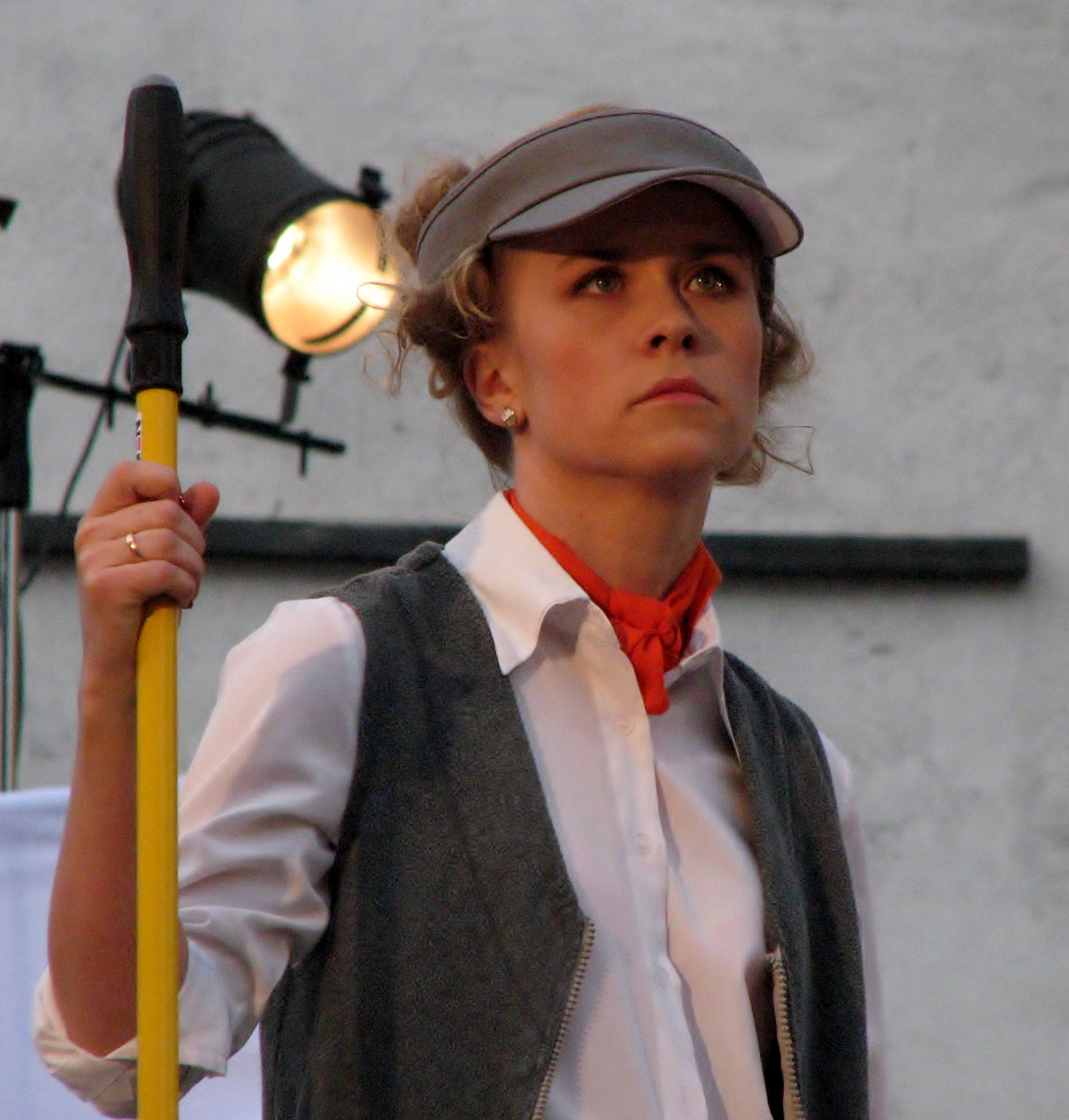
- Evelin Võigemast onstage in 2012.
- Born: Evelin Pang; 22 May 1980 (age 46); Tallinn, then part of Estonian SSR, Soviet Union
- Occupations: Actress, singer
- Years active: 2000–present
- Spouse: Priit Võigemast (2005 – 2017; divorced)
- Children: 2

Evelin Võigemast (until 2007, Evelin Pang; born 22 May 1980) is an Estonian stage, film television and voice actress and singer.

== Early life and education ==
Born Evelin Pang in Tallinn, her parents were Valdur Pang and Eda Pang (née Taska). She has a brother named Margus Pang. She initially studied at Tallinn School No. 21 secondary school, but graduated from Tallinn School No. 49. (now, Tallinn Arte Gymnasium) in 1998. She is also a graduate of the Tallinn Children's Music School (now, the Tallinn Music School) in Kesklinn, Tallinn, where she studied piano.

In 1998, she began studying acting at the Estonian Academy of Music and Theatre under Elmo Nüganen, graduating in 2002. Among his graduating classmates were Priit Võigemast, Karin Rask, Maria Soomets, Hele Kõre, Mart Toome, Ott Aardam, Elisabet Reinsalu, and Argo Aadli.

== Stage career ==
Following graduation, she joined the Tallinn City Theatre in 2002, where she is still currently engaged. She has appeared in roles at the Tallinn City Theatre in works by such varied authors and playwrights as: Shakespeare, Alexandre Dumas, David Auburn, Anton Chekhov, Franz Kafka, Ivan Turgenev, W. B. Yeats, A. H. Tammsaare, Tennessee Williams, Ernest Hemingway, Arnold Wesker and Nikolai Gogol, among others.

She has also performed at the Vanalinnastuudio in roles by Bertolt Brecht and Jim Cartwright; the NUKU Theatre, the Nargen Opera; and at the Vanemuine in Tartu, where she performed as Evita Peron in Andrew Lloyd Webber and Tim Rice's Evita in 2014.

== Film ==
In 2000, Pang began voicing the animated character Lotte in the popular Estonian Lotte films; the first was Lotte Goes South. This was followed by Lotte from Gadgetville in 2006, Lotte and the Moonstone Secret in 2011, and Lotte and the Lost Dragons in 2019. The Lotte films and their characters proved so popular in Estonia that a theme park, Lottemaa, was opened in Reiu, Pärnu County, Estonia.

She was also cast as a voice actress to dub the role of Mittens in the Estonian release of the 2008 American Disney animated feature film Bolt (Estonian: Välk).

She made her feature-length film debut in a small role in the 2002 Elmo Nüganen directed Nimed marmortahvlil (English release titles: Names in Marble and Names Engraved in Marble), based on the novel of the same name by author Albert Kivikas about the Estonian War of Independence. She was billed under her maiden name, Evelin Pang. This was followed by a co-starring role in the Peeter Urbla directed comedy-drama Stiilipidu in 2005, opposite actresses Maarja Jakobson and Anne Reemann. Other film roles include that of Annika Hunt in the Asko Kase directed drama Hundi agoonia; Liisa, in the 2009 Hannu Salonen directed drama Vasha; Evelyn in the 2012 Ain Mäeots directed drama Deemonid; Reet Haljandi in the 2015 Margus Paju directed family adventure film Supilinna Salaselts (English release title: The Secret Society of Souptown), based on the novels of Finnish author Mika Keränen; Marian in the 2017 Andres Maimik and Katrin Maimik directed comedy-drama Minu näoga onu; and Andres' mother in the 2020 Peeter Simm directed coming-of-age period comedy-drama Vee peal.

== Television ==
Evelin Pang made her television debut in the ETV children's series Buratino tegutseb jälle in 2002. In 2008, she would appear as the character Adele Kallaste in the ETV twelve-part television mini-series Tuulepealne maa (Windward Land) which chronicled the pre-World War II history of Estonia, its birth as a country, the Estonian War of Independence, post-war life throughout 1920 up to 1941 and World War II. From 2008 until 2009, she made several appearances on the Kanal 2 crime drama series Kelgukoerad; in 2010, she had a recurring role as Ursula Amarante Malone in the long-running ETV drama series Õnne 13; and in 2012, she played the role of Piret in the TV3 series Nurjatud tüdrukud. She has also made appearances on other television series, such as Riigimehed and the ETV sketch comedy series Tujurikkuja.

In 2011, she co-hosted (along with Hele Kõrve) a season of Eesti otsib superstaari (Estonia is Searching for a Superstar) on TV3; the Estonian version of the British talent show Pop Idol. In 2017 she joined the cast of the ETV ten-part drama series Pank, which follows the rise and subsequent misfortunes of a new bank that which emerges in Estonia in the 1990s.

== Music ==
In 2009, Pang released her debut album "... (album)"; recorded at Blackfish Studios in Tallinn for MFM records. The album consisted mainly of pop and jazz and songs and included Estonian language covers of Serge Gainsbourg's "Poupée de cire poupée de son" (originally recorded by France Gall in 1965) and Sonny Bono's "The Beat Goes On" (originally recorded by Sonny & Cher in 1967). The album also featured cover songs by Estonian artists such as Joel Steinfeldt ("Kaks südant"), Jaan Tätte ("Lööri laul") and Novella Hanson ("Maailm muutub laisemaks"), as well as compositions by Riho Sibul, Arne Oit, Heini Vaikmaa and Aivar Tommingas and lyrics by Villu Kangur, Linnar Priimägi, Merle Ambre, Heldur Karmo, Ave Alavainu and Kustas Kikerpuu. The album garnered her a Gold Record award (Kuldne Plaat) in 2010 at the Estonian Music Awards for Debut Album of the Year.

== Personal life ==
Pang married fellow actor Priit Võigemast in 2005. They have two children; a daughter Loviise born in 2007, and a son Lennart, born in 2009. Since 2007 Pang has used her married surname, Võigemast.

In December 2016, Priit Võigemast announced that after eleven years of marriage, the couple were divorcing.
