= Võigemast =

Family name

Võigemast is an Estonian surname. Notable people with the surname include:

- Evelin Võigemast (born 1980), Estonian actress and singer
- Jüri Võigemast (born 1956), Estonian politician
- Priit Võigemast (born 1980), Estonian actor
