= Maria Annus =

Estonian actress

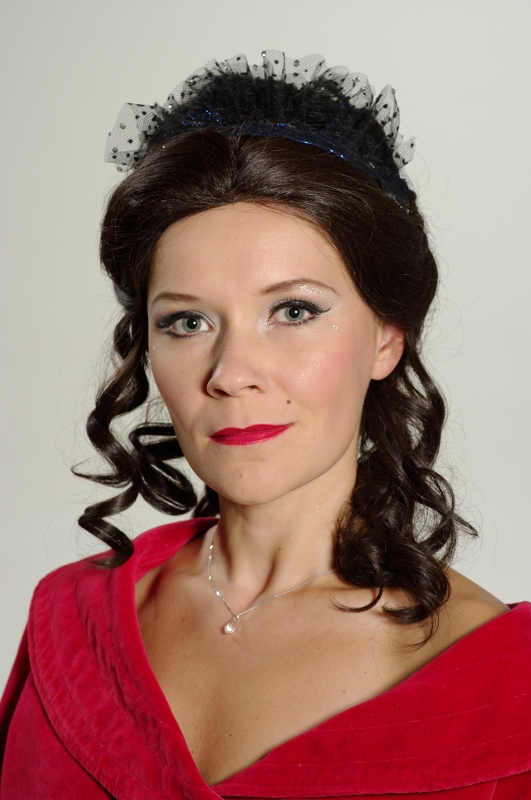
- Annus in theater costume, with wig.
- Born: Maria Soomets; 21 February 1979 (age 47); Tallinn, then part of Estonian SSR, Soviet Union
- Occupation: Actress
- Years active: 2002–present
- Spouse: Robert Annus (m. 2016)
- Children: 1

Maria Annus (until 2016, Maria Soomets; born 21 February 1979) is an Estonian stage, television and film actress.

== Early life and education ==
Maria Soomets was born in Tallinn on 21 February 1979. She has an older brother, Simmo Soomets, born in 1974. She attended primary and secondary schools in Tallinn and in her youth sang with the Ellerhein Girls' Choir. After secondary school, she studied acting at the EMA Higher Drama School (now, the Estonian Academy of Music and Theatre), graduating in 2002. Among her graduating classmates were Priit Võigemast, Ott Aardam, Hele Kõrve, Karin Rask, Mart Toome, Evelin Võigemast, Elisabet Reinsalu, and Argo Aadli.

== Stage career ==
Following graduation from EMA Higher Drama School, Annus (then, Soomets) became engaged as an actress at the Ugala theatre in Viljandi in 2002. Her first stage role at the Ugala was the character of Sonja in a 2002 production of Anton Chekhov's Uncle Vanya. She would remain an actress at the Ugala until 2007. Among her more memorable roles at the Ugala are in works by: Hella Wuolijoki, Woody Allen, August Gailit, Nikolai Gogol, Jean Anouilh, Brian Friel, Leo Tolstoy, Oskar Luts, Antonio Buero Vallejo, and Charles De Coster, among others.

In May, 2008, Maria Annus became engaged at the Vanemuine theatre in Tartu. Her first role as an actress with the theatre was as Emma Kent in a production of Edward Taylor's 1992 thriller Murder by Misadventure. Annus would go on to perform in stage appearances in productions by such varied international authors and playwrights as: Shakespeare, Franz Kafka, Ödön von Horvath, Martin Crimp, Harper Lee, Ray Cooney, and Robert James Waller; as well as in roles by works of such Estonian authors and playwrights as: Uku Uusberg, Urmas Lennuk, Mihkel Raud, Tiina Laanem, Loone Ots, Janno Põldma, and Heiki Ernits.

Annus has also performed as a stage actress in productions at Tallinn's R.A.A.A.M. theatre, the Tartu New Theatre, and the Luke Manor theatre in Nõo Parish.

== Television and film ==
Annus's first substantial television role was as the character Malvina in the Eesti Televisioon (ETV) children's television series Buratino tegutseb jälle in 2002; a role which she would play until the series ended in 2005. This was followed by the role of Anni on another ETV children's television series, Saame kokku Tomi juures, from 2006 until 2011. From 2007 until 2009, she also appeared as the character Ira on the TV3 drama Brigaad 3, which follows the work and lives of an ambulance crew.

Annus has also made a number of appearances on other television series, among them; the ETV crime drama series Ohtlik lend in 2007; the TV3 comedy-crime series Kättemaksukontor in 2012 and 2013; the ETV comedy series ENSV in 2012; and the Kanal 2 crime drama series Viimane võmm in 2016, among others.

In 2003, Annus made her screen debut in the Anu Aun directed drama Liivakellade parandaja for Exitfilm. The short film was based on the eponymously titled 2001 play penned by Urmas Lennuk. In 2013, she appeared as Roosi in the Hardi Volmer directed historical melodrama feature film Elavad pildid, which follows two Estonians, a girl and a boy, born at the beginning of the 20th-century in a Baltic German manor, through the coming decades and all of the revolutions, wars, military occupations, regime collapses, and new beginnings. In 2018, she appeared alongside her husband Robert in the Anu Aun directed family-Christmas film Eia jõulud Tondikakul.

== Personal life ==
On 22 June 2016, Maria Soomets married actor Robert Annus. The couple met during filming of the ETV children's television series Buratino tegutseb jälle and had been in a long-term relationship. They have one daughter, Noora, born in 2010, and reside in Tartu. Since her marriage, she has used her married name, Annus.
