= Annely Peebo =

Estonian singer

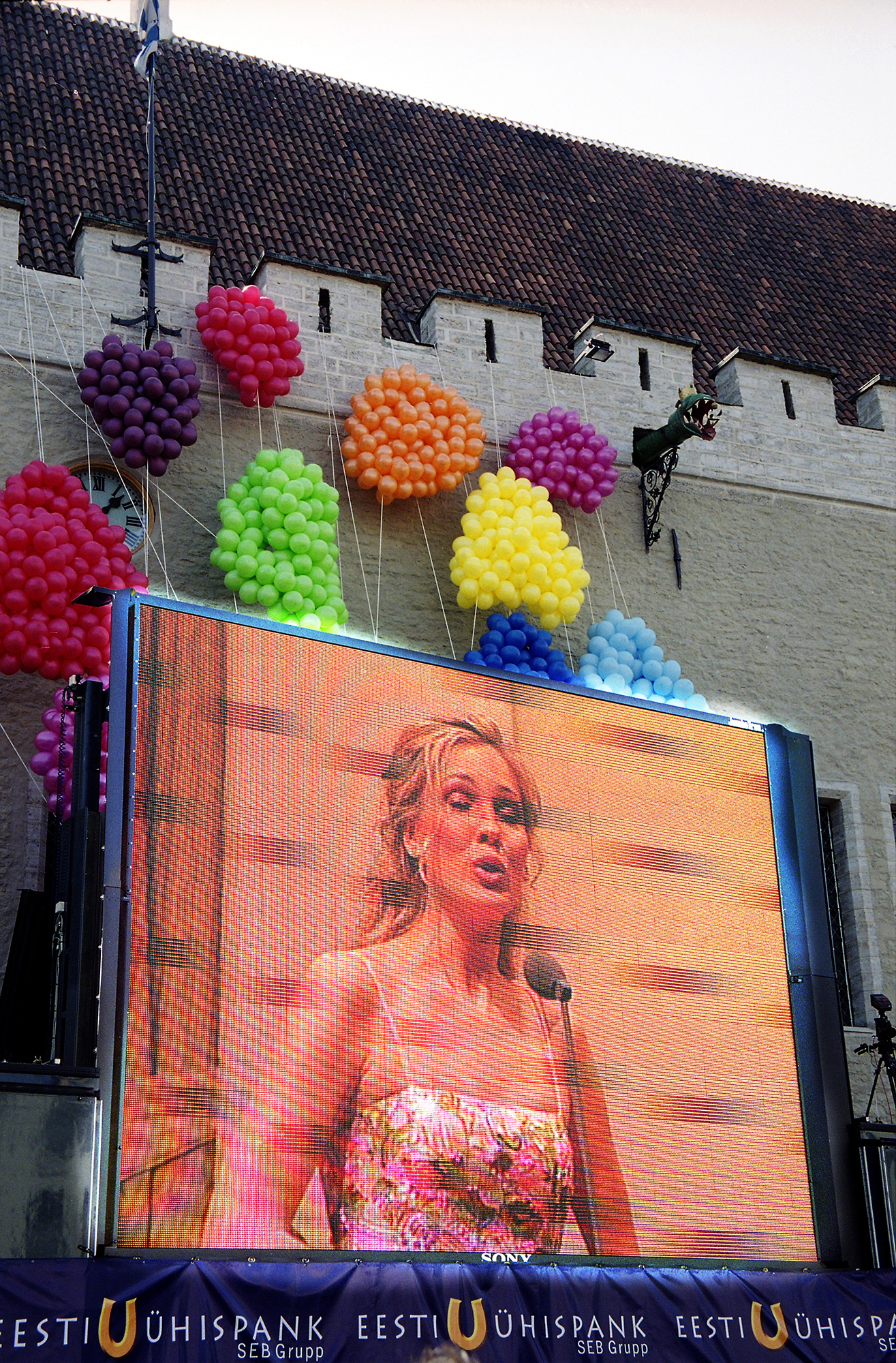

Background information
- Born: 16 November 1971 (age 54); Viljandi, then part of Estonian SSR, Soviet Union
- Genres: Opera, classical
- Occupation: Singer
- Years active: 1991–present

Annely Peebo (born 16 November 1971) is an Estonian operatic mezzo-soprano. She was a co-host of the Eurovision Song Contest 2002 in Tallinn.

== Life and career ==
Annely Peebo gained a diploma for choral conducting and completed vocal studies in opera. She studied at the University of Music and Dramatic Arts Vienna in Vienna, Austria, where she studied singing with Professor Gerhard Kahry and opera with Professor Curt Malm. In 1997, she became a permanent ensemble member of the Vienna Volksoper after her debut at the Vienna State Opera in Rigoletto the same year.

Peebo is a regular at various festivals. At the Vienna Festival in 2001, she sang the role of Meroe in the first performance of the expressionistic opera, Penthesilea by Othmar Schoeck (after Heinrich von Kleist). At the Salzburg Festival in 2002, she performed works by Mozart and Gershwin. Over the years, she has performed together with the likes of Plácido Domingo, José Carreras, Andrea Bocelli, Renato Bruson, and Stefania Bonfadelli.

Peebo speaks five languages, which allowed her to play a leading role in the French movie Les leçons des ténèbres as well as hosting the Eurovision Song Contest 2002 in Tallinn together with Marko Matvere.

Peebo is married and has two children. The multi-lingual family lives in Austria.

== See also ==
- List of Eurovision Song Contest presenters

Preceded by (Denmark) Søren Pilmark & Natasja Crone Back	Eurovision Song Contest presenter (with Marko Matvere); 2002	Succeeded by (Latvia) Renārs Kaupers & Marie N
