= Reinsalu =

Family name

Reinsalu is an Estonian surname. Notable people with the surname include:

- Elisabet Reinsalu (nee Tamm; born 1976), Estonian actress
- Urmas Reinsalu (born 1975), Estonian politician
