= Ohtlik lend =

Estonian television series

Ohtlik lend (English: Dangerous Flight) is an Estonian television crime series. In the series, detective Andres (Marko Matvere) and his colleague Rita (Elisabet Reinsalu) solve crime cases. In the first series, the activities take place in Pärnu, and in the second session, in Tallinn.

The series is directed by Ain Prosa.

The series aired from 2006 until 2007 on Eesti Televisioon (ETV).

== Cast ==
- Marko Matvere as Detective Andres Västrik
- Elisabet Reinsalu as Detective Rita Leidpalu
- Piret Kalda as Katrin
- Jaan Rekkor as Rein
- Maria Klenskaja as Ella
- Üllar Saaremäe as Toomas
- Leino Rei as Marek
- Karol Kuntsel as Rene
- Ursula Ratasepp as Kaja
- Argo Aadli as Dan
