= Martin Veinmann =

Estonian actor

- Born: 2 December 1950 (age 75); Tallinn, then part of Estonian SSR, Soviet Union
- Education: Estonian Academy of Music and Theatre
- Occupation: Actor
- Years active: 1972–present
- Height: 5 ft 10 3/4 in (1.797 m)

Martin Veinmann (born 2 December 1950 in Tallinn) is an Estonian actor. He has appeared in several movies and TV shows like Šlaager (1982), Jaani öö (2014) and Kodu keset linna (2003–2011).

== Alma mater ==
In 1972 he graduated from the Stage Art Department of the Tallinn State Conservatory.

Since 1972 he is working at Estonian Drama Theatre.

== Award show participation ==
Besides from various art work he also attended many awards shows:

- 1980: Meritorious artist of the Estonian SSR
- 1980: Ants Lauter prize
- 2017: Order of the White Star, IV class

== Filmography ==
- Šlaager, 1982
- Karoliine hõbelõng, 1984
- Nimed marmortahvlil, 2002 (role: commander of the battalion)
- Kaksikelu, 2003
- Jaani öö, 2014
- Kodu keset linna, 2003–2011
