= Marko Matvere =

Estonian actor and singer

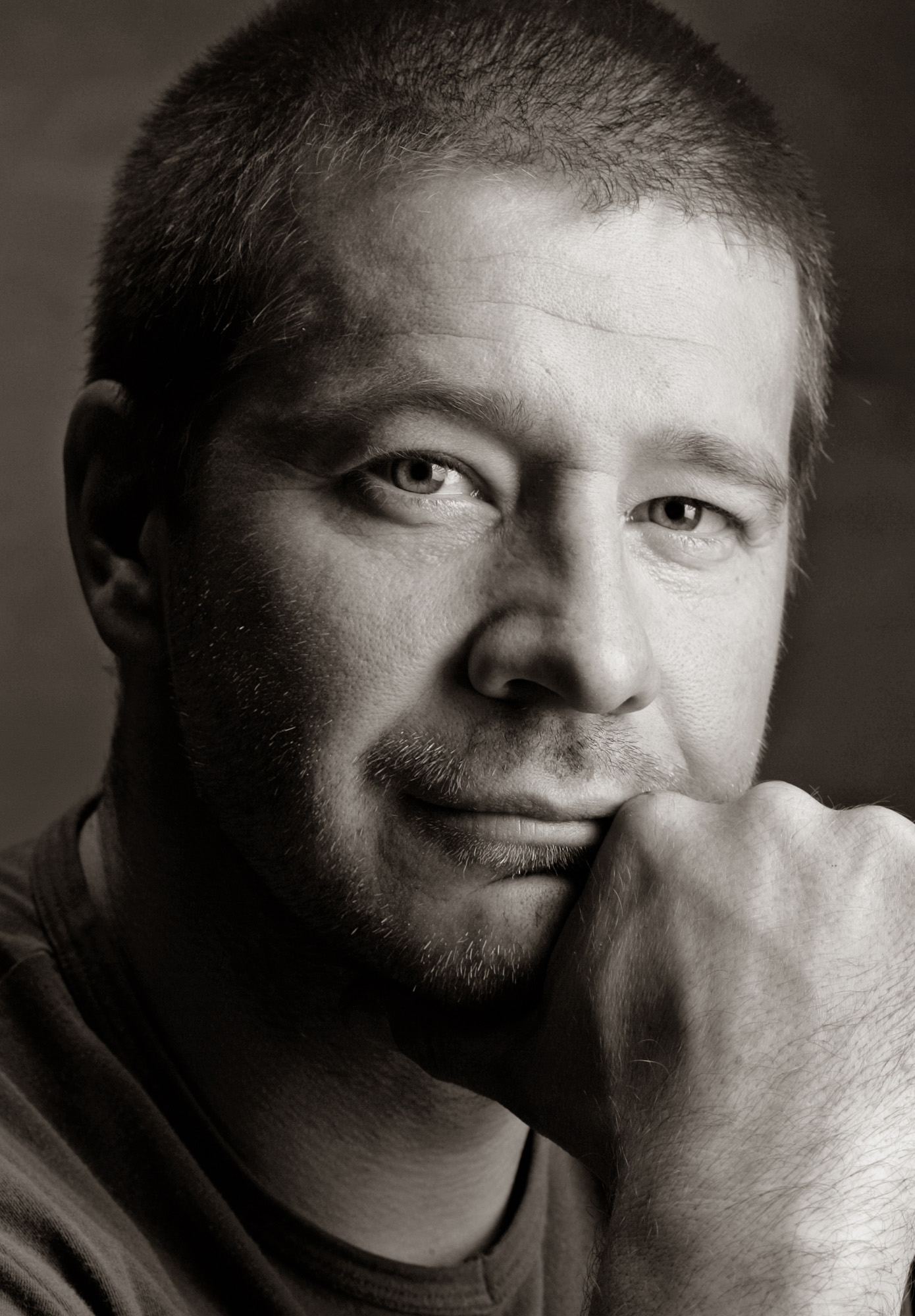
- Born: Marko Matvere; 4 February 1968 (age 58); Pärnu, then part of Estonian SSR, Soviet Union
- Occupation: Actor
- Years active: 1993–present
- Spouse: Tiina Matvere

Marko Matvere (born 4 February 1968) is an Estonian actor and singer. He was the lead actor of the Tallinn City Theatre, but left to become a freelance actor in 2004.

== Biography ==
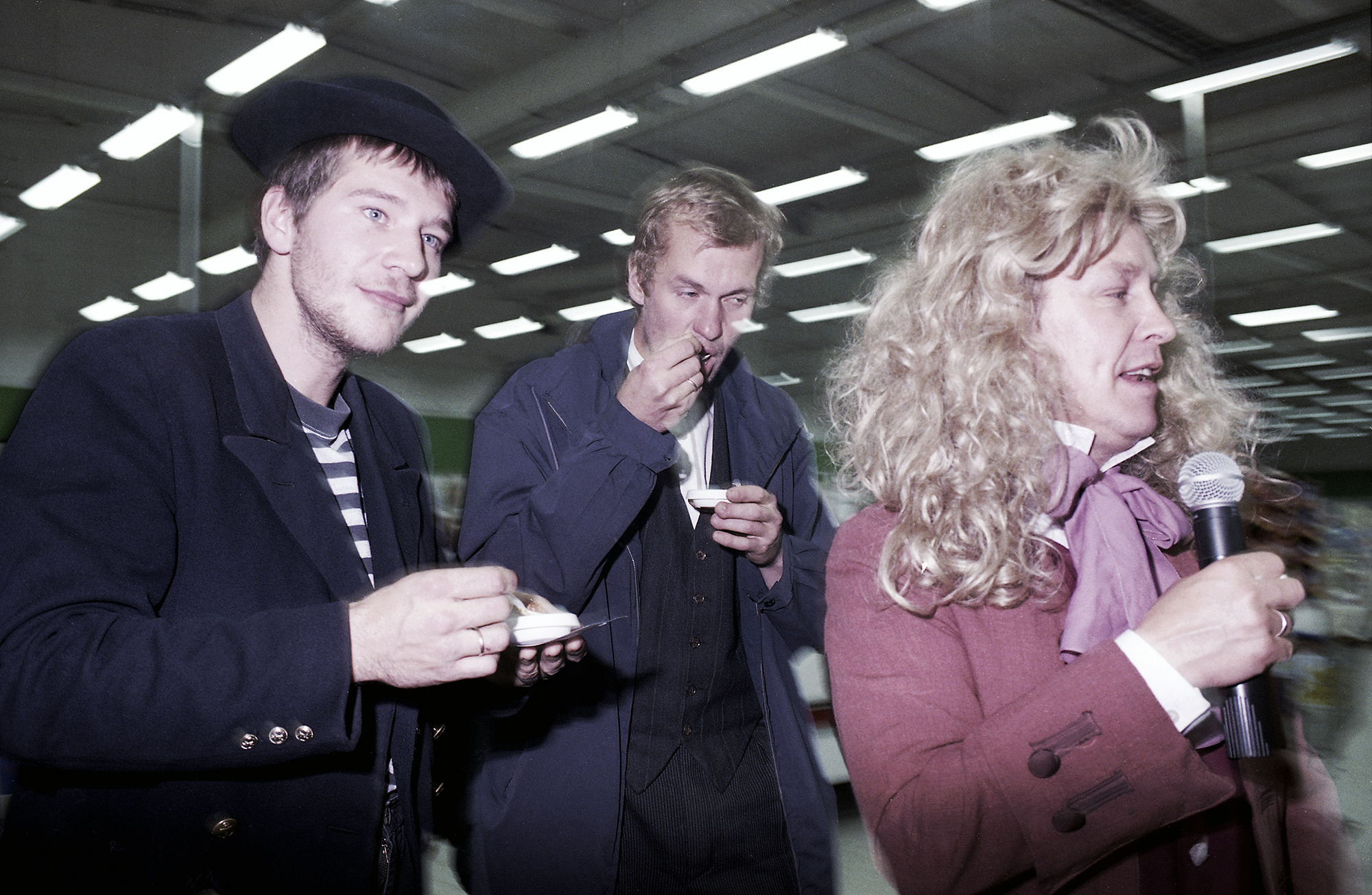
Matvere (far left), Jaan Tätte and Lauri Nebel in 1996

Matvere was born in Pärnu and graduated from the Tallinn Conservatory (now the Estonian Academy of Music and Theatre) in 1990. He is married to Tiina Matvere and they have a daughter, Matilde, and a son, Oskar.

Matvere has performed in many musicals, including Les Misérables, Tanz der Vampire, The Sound of Music, and Miss Saigon. He has performed the main role in several films ("Georg) and television series. He hosted the Eurovision Song Contest 2002 with Annely Peebo. He has also hosted the TV show Songs with Stars with Karin Rask. He has been a member of the music group "Väikeste lõõtspillide ühing" ("Association of Little Accordions") since 1989 and released two albums with Jaan Tätte.

He made his first movie appearance in Suflöör (1993). Matvere has played or voiced in a number of and television series including foreign television series.

== Recognition ==
Marko has been awarded with the First Prize in the category of young actors at the International Theatre Festival in Torun in 1992, the Estonian Theatre Union Award in 1996, the award for Best Actor in 1997 at the National Drama Festival, and the Tallinn City Theatre Collegiate awards of Best Actor in 1995, 1996, 1998, and 1999.

== Filmography ==
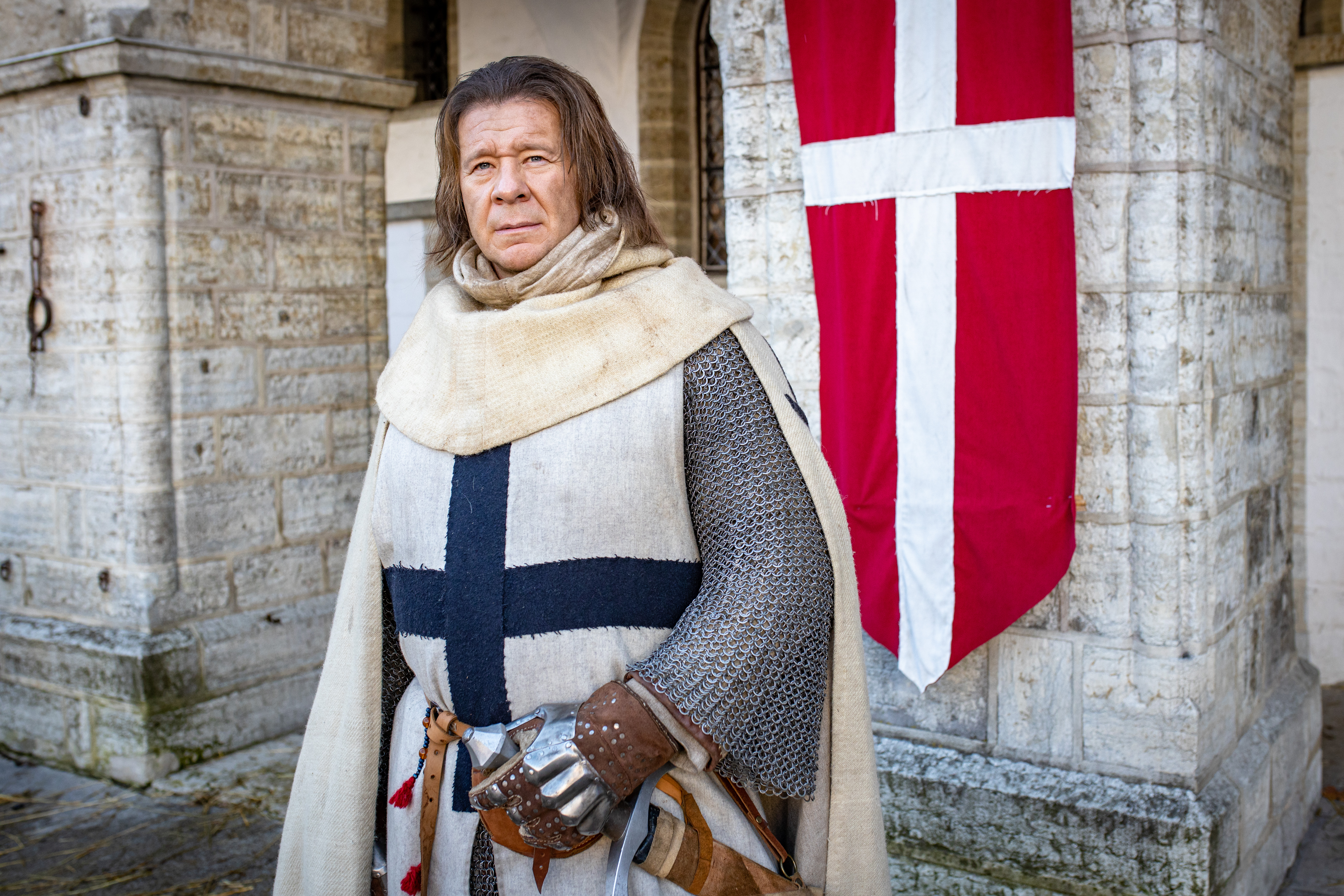
Matvere as the character Spanheim in the 2022 Elmo Nüganen directed film Apteeker Melchior

Films

Year	Film	Role	Film gross	Notes
1993	Suflöör	Karl		
1994	Tulivesi	Pilli-Villu		
1994	Jüri Rumm	Robert		
2001	Lepatriinude jõulud	Pedro (voice)		
2003	Vanad ja kobedad saavad jalad alla	Ranger		
2006	Vana daami visiit	Bodyguard Roby		
2006	Leiutajateküla Lotte	Mati (voice)		
2007	Georg	Georg Ots	32 million EEK	
2009	Johan Falk: National Target	Raivo		video
2018	Mihkel	Mihkel's father		
2020	On the Water	Valter		
2022	Kiik, Kirves ja Igavese Armastuse Puu	Sir Juhan Denholm		
2022	Apteeker Melchior	Spanheim		
2022	Apteeker Melchior. Viirastus	Spanheim		

Television

Year	Title	Role
1995	Wikmani poisid	Penno
1996	M Klubi	Maahärra
2001	Bekännelsen	Peeter
2004	Kodu keset linna	Mihkel
2006	Tusenbröder	Mart
2006	Georg (musical)	Georg Ots
2006–07	Ohtlik lend	Andres Västrik
2008	Tuulepealne maa	Artur Kallaste
2020	Tulejoonel	Jakob Sommer
2022	Armastus	Kuldar Kivi

== See also ==
- List of Eurovision Song Contest presenters

Preceded by (Denmark) Søren Pilmark & Natasja Crone Back	Eurovision Song Contest presenter (with Annely Peebo); 2002	Succeeded by (Latvia) Renārs Kaupers & Marie N
