= Wikmani poisid (TV series) =

Estonian television series

- Created by: Hugo Ader; Andres Maimik; Anu Soolep; Vilja Nyholm-Palm
- Directed by: Vilja Palm
- Starring: Mait Malmsten; Mikk Mikiver; Liina Olmaru; Indrek Sammul; Marko Matvere
- Theme music composer: Sven Grünberg
- Country of origin: Estonia
- Original language: Estonian
- No. of seasons: 1
- No. of episodes: 12

Production
- Running time: 32 minutes

Original release
- Network: ETV
- Release: 1995

Wikmani poisid (lit. Wikman Boys) is a 1995-year television drama serial about the Wikman Private Gymnasium students from 1937 till their mobilization in 1944. The series is based on a 1988 novel Wikmani poisid by Jaan Kross.

The series were first aired in 1995 on Estonia's Eesti Televisioon. Each episode runs at approximately 30 minutes. The show was created by Hugo Ader, Andres Maimik, Anu Soolep and Vilja Nyholm-Palm. DVD was published in the 2003.

== Cast ==
- Mikk Mikiver as Johan Wikman
- Mait Malmsten as Jaak Sirkel
- Meelis Muhu as Vare
- Marko Matvere as Penno
- Ain Mäeots as Juhan Pukspuu
- Ago Anderson as Tummel
- Indrek Sammul as Richard Laasik
- Meelis Pai as Kristjan Koorman
- Raivo Maripuu as Kelder
- Tiit Kikas as Jauram
- Andre Aarniste as Feliks
- Ain Prosa as Maim
- Liina Olmaru as Virve
- Piret Kalda as Aino
- Lauri-Kare Laos as Rumma
- Ardo Ran Varres as Haaviksoo
- Kalju Orro as Constable Tults
- Andres Noormets as Mr. Kõiv
- Rudolf Allabert as Mr. Tooder
- Kaie Mihkelson as Mrs. Pukspuu
- Madis Kalmet as Mr. Ambel
- Elle Kull as Mrs. Sirkel
- Helene Vannari as Maria
- Rein Laos as Mr. Trump
- Mikk Mikiver as Mr. Wikman
- Aarne Üksküla as Mr. Hellmann
- Peeter Kard as Mr. Puhm
- Mari Lill as Mrs. Laasik
- Aime Kala as Mrs. Ambrosius
- Luule Komissarov as Madame Lülli
- Pille Lukin as Britta
- Kaljo Kiisk as Mr. Weseler
- Hans Kaldoja as Dr. Saar
- Mati Klooren as Mr. Tusam
- Kristo Vahu as Aabel Tooder
- Liia Kanemägi as Suur-Tiia
- Elina Reinold as Maila
- Anne Arendi as Väike-Tiia
- Enn Kraam as Mr. Markson
- Jaan Rekkor as Mr. Saul
- Maria Klenskaja as Mrs. Jakovleva
- Rein Oja as Mr. Pahkla
- Anu Olvik as Ella Laasik
- Toomas Kreen as Mr. Krafft
- Anu Presjärv as Waitress
- Ines Aru as Housekeeper
