= Vilja Nyholm-Palm =

Estionian director

Vilja Nyholm-Palm (since 2004 Palm; born 12 May 1957) is an Estonian theatre and film director.

She was born in Tallinn.

Since 1975 she worked at Estonian Television. 1994-2005 she taught at Tallinn University. 1999-2001 she was the program director of Kanal 2.

== Filmography ==
- 1995 "Wikmani poisid" (director)
- 1998 "Isa" (television feature film; producer)
- 1999 "Armuke" (television feature film; producer)
- 2003 "Kodu keset linna" (director)
