= Meelis Pai =

Estonian theatre leader, producer, and actor

Meelis Pai (born 9 February 1968) is an Estonian theatre leader and theatre producer and occasional actor.

Pai was born in Tartu. In 1996 he graduated from Tallinn Pedagogical University in theatre management speciality (Estonian: näitejuhtimine).

From 2000 until 2013, he was the head of NUKU Theatre. Since 2015 he is the artistical leader of Salme Cultural Centre.

He has participated on several television series, including the roles of Kristjan Koorman in Wikmani poisid (1994) and Toomas in Kelgukoerad (2007).

In 2010 he was awarded with Order of the White Star, IV class.
