= Tallinna Arte Gümnaasium =

School in the district of Mustamäe, Tallinn, Estonia

Coordinates: 59.4038793°N 24.69155791°E

Tallinn Arte Gymnasium
- Tallinna Arte Gümnaasium

Location
- Vilde tee 62; Tallinn; Estonia

Information
- Type: Public
- Established: 1981
- Principal: Sirje Ebral
- Grades: 1–12
- Language: Estonian
- Website: www.arte.edu.ee

Tallinna Arte Gümnaasium (Tallinn Arte Gymnasium) is a school, located in the district of Mustamäe, Tallinn, Estonia. As of September 2008, the headmaster is the former headteacher, Sirje Ebral.

== Early history ==
The school was founded in 1981 as Tallinn Secondary School No. 49 (Tallinna 49. keskkool). It was renamed in 2002. The school had already built an indoor swimming pool, which was also opened in 1981. In 1983, the famous junior football club, "Tallinna Lõvid" (Lions of Tallinn), was founded. Later that year, the school started with its first Mothers-Day concert "Orhidee Emale", which remains an annual tradition of the school. In 1991, the school opened a renovated library.

== Later history ==
During 2001/2002, the school's bathrooms, gym, pool, library, cafeteria and the main lounge have been renovated. Later in 2021/2022, the school was entirely rebuilt.

== Famous graduates ==
- Mart Poom – Estonian football goalkeeper
- Martin Müürsepp – Estonian basketballer
- Martin Reim – Estonian footballer
- Maret Maripuu – Estonian politician
- Evelin Pang - Estonian actress
