= Stefania Bonfadelli =

Italian operatic soprano

Stefania Bonfadelli (born 1967) is an Italian operatic soprano.

She began studying pianoforte at eight years of age and singing at fourteen in Verona, and later continued these studies in Paris and Vienna. Her operatic debut was with I puritani in 1997 at the Vienna State Opera. She also performs in concerts, notably at the Hamburg State Opera, the Bayerische Staatsoper, Oper Frankfurt, the Opéra de Marseille, the Teatro De La Maestranza in Seville, the Concertgebouw and Netherlands Opera in Amsterdam, the Vienna State Opera, the Michigan Opera Theatre in Detroit, the Royal Opera House, Covent Garden, London, La Scala in Milan, the Teatro Regio, Turin, the Teatro di San Carlo in Naples, and the Teatro Verdi in Trieste.

== Recordings (DVD) ==
- Violetta in La traviata Ahoy Rotterdam 2000 (Companions Opera 500493) and Teatro Verdi Busseto 2002 (TDK DVUS-OPLTRM)
- Lucia di Lammermoor (title role) Teatro Carlo Felice, Genoa 2003 (TDK DV-OPLDIL)
- New Year's Concert 2004 from the reopened Teatro La Fenice, with Roberto Aronica, Greta Hodgkinson, and Roberto Bolle, and conducted by Lorin Maazel - Venice (TDK DV-NYC4V)
