= Jüri Võigemast =

Estonian politician (born 1956)

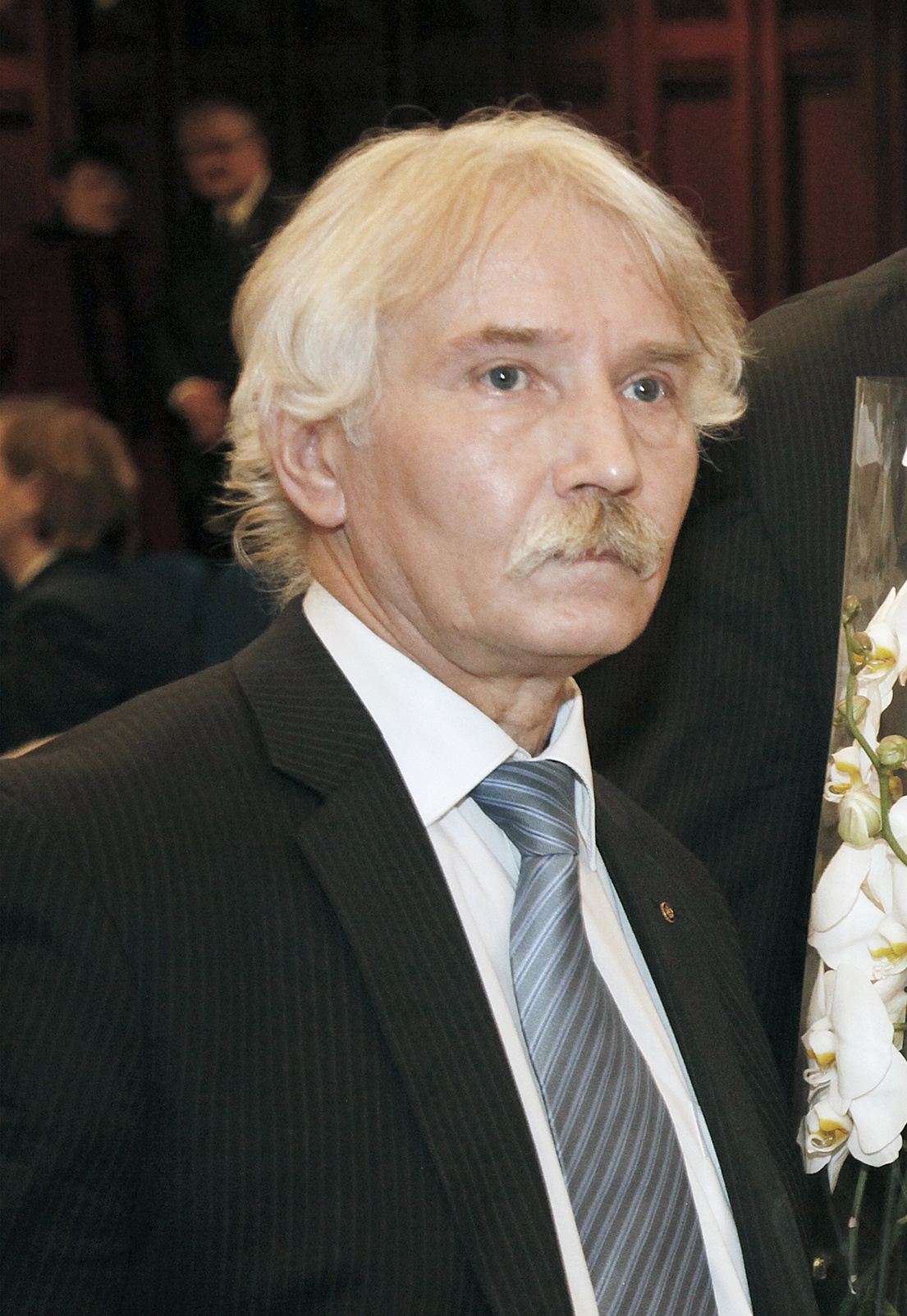
Jüri Võigemast in 2013

Jüri Võigemast (born 18 November 1956 in Rapla) is an Estonian politician.

From 1991 he is a member of the Estonian Centre Party.

In 2002–2003 he was a member of IX Riigikogu.

His son is an actor Priit Võigemast.
