= Kodu keset linna =

Estonian television series

Kodu keset linna (English: Home in the City) is an Estonian television soap opera. The activities of series take place in Tallinn where the Uuspere family lives.

The series is directed by Roman Baskin, Vilja Palm, and Martin Korjus.

The series was on the air from 2003 to 2006 and from 2007 to 2011 in TV3.

== Cast ==
- Hannes Uuspere (Martin Veinmann)
- Helen Uuspere (Kleer Maibaum)
