= Names in Marble (film) =

2002 film directed by Elmo Nüganen

Names in Marble Estonian: Nimed marmortahvlil
- Directed by: Elmo Nüganen
- Written by: Elmo Nüganen; Kristian Taska
- Produced by: Kristian Taska
- Starring: Priit Võigemast; Indrek Sammul; Hele Kõre
- Cinematography: Sergey Astakhov
- Music by: Margo Kõlar
- Release date: 2002
- Running time: 95 minutes
- Countries: Estonia; Finland
- Language: Estonian
- Budget: 19 million EEK

Names in Marble (Estonian: Nimed marmortahvlil) is an Estonian 2002 film directed by Elmo Nüganen. It is based on Albert Kivikas' 1936 novel of the same name about the Estonian War of Independence fought in 1918–1920.

== Plot summary ==
Two brothers choose the opposite sides in the Estonian War of Independence. In November 1918, the bolshevik Red Army of Soviet Russia invades Estonia, and the newly independent country's government declares a general mobilization. Henn Ahas, son of a poor family, in his inner struggles, hesitates at first as he does not know whether to follow his brother to the bolshevik side or join the government forces. He decides to join the government troops and heads for the front to reach the unit of his gymnasium classmates.

Ahas is captured by the Red bolshevik forces. In captivity, he meets Marta, a young girl from a wealthy family. A Finnish officer, Sulo Kallio, who has arrived in Estonia to support the government forces, helps Ahas and Marta to escape. Ahas joins the same unit with all his classmates, and through the battles and adventures that follow, the young brothers-in-arms grow up, although destiny would also bring them some bitter surprises and sacrifices.

== Cast ==
- Henn Ahas – Priit Võigemast
- Ants Ahas – Indrek Sammul
- Marta – Hele Kõre
- Käsper – Alo Kõrve
- Tääker – Anti Reinthal
- Mugur – Ott Sepp
- Miljan – Mart Toome
- Martinson – Karol Kuntsel
- Kohlapuu – Ott Aardam
- Karakull – Guido Kangur
- Konsap – Argo Aadli
- Käämer – Bert Raudsep
- Sulo Kallio – Peter Franzén
- Captain – Jaan Tätte
- Militia unit leader – Hannes Kaljujärv
- Battalion commander (Karl Einbund) – Martin Veinmann
