= Urmas Lennuk =

Estonian theatre director

- Born: 16 October 1971 (age 55); Tamsalu, Soviet Union (now Estonia)
- Education: Estonian Academy of Music and Theatre
- Years active: 1998–present
- Employers: Rakvere Theatre (2000–2011); Vanemuine Theatre (2011–2013); Rakvere Theatre (2017–present)
- Notable work: Õnne 13

Urmas "Ummi" Lennuk (born 16 October 1971, in Tamsalu) is an Estonian theatre director, playwright and dramaturg.

In 2000, he graduated from the Estonian Academy of Music and Theatre's Stage Art Department. In 2000–11, he worked at Rakvere Theatre and in 2011–13 at Vanemuine Theatre. Since 2017, he has worked again at Rakvere Theatre. In 2011–14, he was a screenwriter for the television series Õnne 13.

Lennuk thinks Estonian theatre practitioners should have more faith in local playwrights, literature, and texts. According to Lennuk, those who wish to depict Estonians should be given the opportunity to do so on stage, as failing to do so diminishes the value of Estonian culture and identity.

Lennuk is married to the actress Liisa Aibel. They have a daughter, adopted in May 2008.

== Productions of plays ==
- Melfi's Linnubassein (1998, diploma work, Estonian Puppetry Theatre)
- Koidula's Säärane Mulk ehk Sada tangu (1999)
- Williams's Iguaani öö (2000)
