= Jaan Tätte =

Estonian actor, singer, and writer

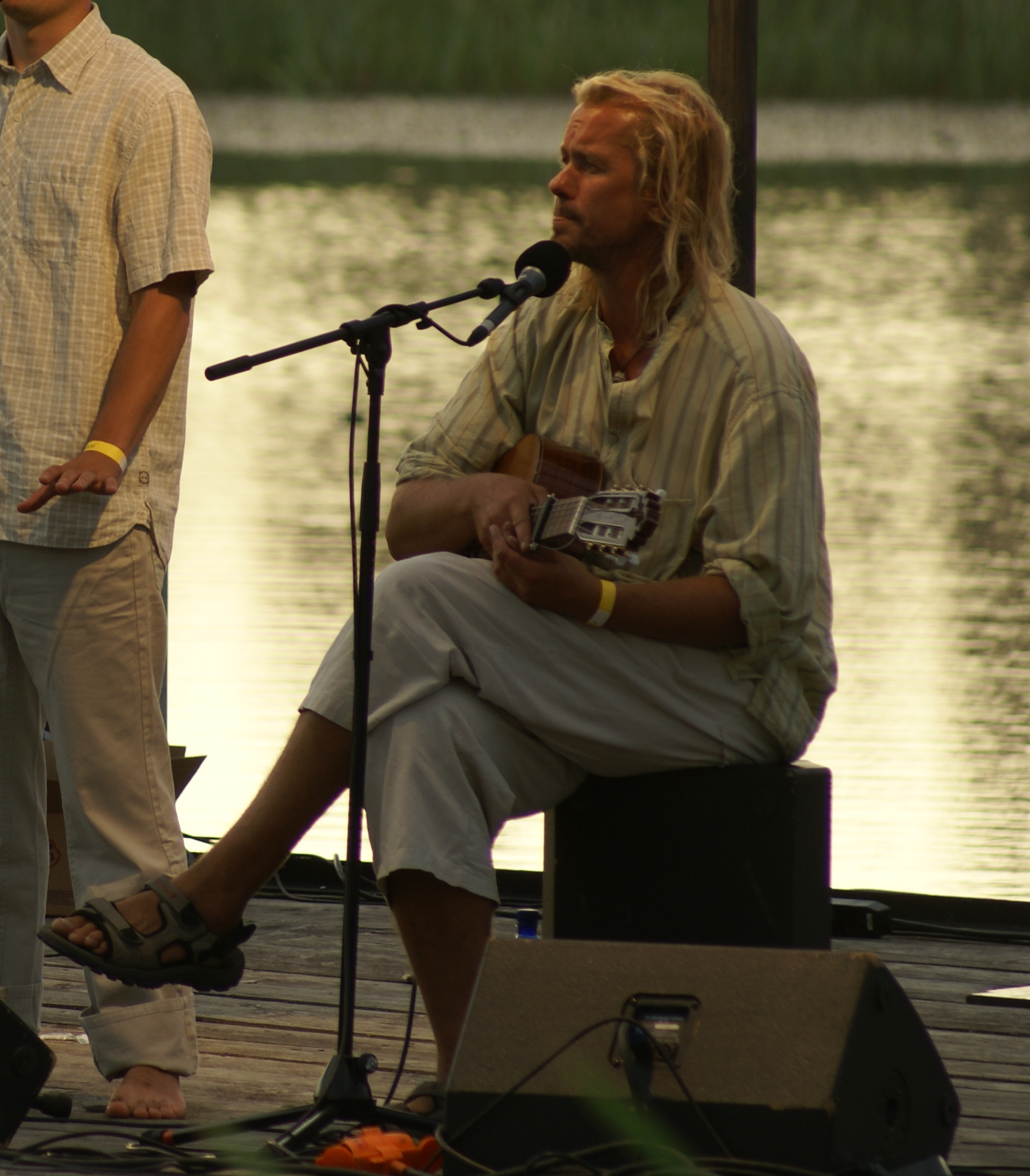
Jaan Tätte at Leigo Lake Music Festival in 2007.

Jaan Tätte (born 24 March 1964 in Viljandi) is an Estonian playwright, poet, actor, and singer.

== Biography ==
From 1982 to 1984 Tätte studied biology at the University of Tartu. From 1985 to 1986 he attended a graduate program at the Tallinn Pedagogical Institute (now Tallinn University) and studied acting in the drama department of the Tallinn Conservatory (now, the Estonian Academy of Music and Theatre), graduating in 1990. Since 1990 he has been an ensemble member of the Tallinn City Theatre. Since 2003 he has worked as a playwright at the same theater. He has also been involved in films.

Towards the end of the 1990s, he began to write plays that would make him well-known beyond the borders of Estonia. His first piece "Ristumine peateega" (Bungee Jumping) was a great success. In 2000 "Sild" (The Bridge), followed in 2001. In 2005, he wrote "Palju õnne argipäevaks!"(Fasten Seat Belts or Good Luck to Everyday Life) and "Meeletu". "Kaev" was premiered in June 2006 in Tallinn.

Since 2004 he has also appeared as a singer with Marko Matvere; they have released two CDs together. He is married and has two children.

== Filmography ==
- Ainult hulludele ehk halastajaõde (1990)
- Firewater (Estonian: Tulivesi; 1994)
- The Shoe (Latvian: Kurpe, German: Der Schuh; 1998)
- The Highway Crossing (Estonian: Ristumine peateega; 1999)
- Names in Marble (Estonian: Nimed marmortahvlil; 2002)

== Discography ==
=== Studio albums ===
- Majakavahi armuhüüd (2000) - with Marko Matvere
- Mine mine (2001)
- Olemine (2004) - with Marko Matvere
- Tulemine (2009)
- Äratund (2012)
- Peatus (2014)

=== Live albums ===
- Laulude õhtu "Vana kuub" (2005) - with Marko Matvere
- Tuulevaiksel ööl (2010)
- Viimane tuulevaikne öö (2010) - with Marko Matvere

== Awards ==
- 1996 Scholarship from Estonian Cultural Capital
- 1997 Second prize of the comedy competition of the Estonian Theater Agency
- 1997 Cultural prize "Big Car" for the best lyrics
- 1999 Cultural Prize "Big Car" for the best drama
- 2001 Second prize of the comedy competition of the Estonian Theater Agency
- 2002 Annual prize of the Estonian Theater Agency
- 2002 Literature Prize of the Baltic Assembly
- 2004 Order of the White Star V. Class
- 2010 Annual prize of Estonian music
