= Names in Marble =

1936 novel by Albert Kivikas

- Names in Marble
- Author: Albert Kivikas
- Original title: Nimed marmortahvlil
- Cover artist: Eduard Järv
- Language: Estonian
- Series: Names in Marble
- Subject: War of Estonian Independence
- Publisher: Estonian Publishers' Cooperative
- Publication date: 1936
- Publication place: Estonia
- Media type: Print (Hardback & Paperback)
- Pages: 539
- Followed by: Names in Marble II

Names in Marble (Estonian: Nimed marmortahvlil) is an Estonian war novel written by Albert Kivikas. It was published in 1936, and its subject is the Estonian War of Independence. Kivikas received an award by the Estonian Literature Society for the novel. It is one of the best-known works of Estonian literature. The film adaptation of the novel was released in 2002.

== Background ==
Names in Marble is based on the personal experiences of Albert Kivikas during the Estonian War of Independence. Through the main characters of the book, the two major political movements of the era, nationalism and communism are portrayed. The book also portrays the uncertainty among Estonians at that period about the future of the country.

== Plot summary ==
The novel is divided in three parts. The main characters of the novel are two brothers, Henn and Juhan Ahas. In the first part, set at the beginning of the war, a group of students from Tartu join the Estonian Army (most students join immediately). In the beginning, Henn Ahas hesitates but after his hometown is attacked he joins the army. In the first part, the political and economic situation of the nation is described through the group of students. The second part contains autobiographical references and describes the situation at the war front, and the experiences of soldiers. The third part of the novel focuses on the final stage of the war and in particular the Treaty of Tartu, which recognised the independence of Estonia. The book ends with the group of students returning to their homes.

== Theatrical and film adaptations ==
In 1937 Albert Kivikas was awarded by the Estonian Literature Society for Names in Marble with the State Elder Award (Estonian: Riigivanema auhind) of 1937. This led in 1939 to the publication of a theatrical version of the novel. It was divided in three acts, and contained 109 pages. Names in Marble the play was directed by Ants Lauter and its premiere was on February 24, 1939. The role of Henn Ahas was played by Tees Koppel.

In 2002 a film of the same name and based on the novel was released in Estonia. It was directed by Elmo Nüganen, and Priit Võigemast starred as the main character Henn Ahas. Names in Marble is the highest budgeted Estonian feature film and the most successful film in Estonia in terms of box office profits.
