= Albert Kivikas =

Estonian writer and journalist

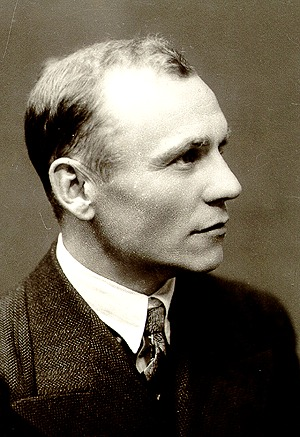
- Kivikas in 1930
- Born: 18 January 1898; Groß-St. Johannis, Governorate of Livonia, Russian Empire
- Died: 19 May 1978 (aged 80); Lund, Sweden
- Occupations: writer, journalist
- Writing career
- Pen name: A.Pedajas, Mart Karus
- Period: 1919 - 1963
- Subject: Estonian War of Independence
- Notable works: Names in Marble, Black Blood
- Literary movement: futurism, expressionism

Albert Kivikas (18 January [O.S. 6 January] 1898 – 19 May 1978) was an Estonian writer and journalist. He is best known as the author of the book Names in Marble (Estonian: Nimed marmortahvlil), the subject of which is the Estonian War of Independence.

== Life ==
Albert Kivikas was born in Suure-Jaani (Groß-St. Johannis), Livonia, which at the time was part of the Russian Empire. His mother, Anu Kivikas, was a weaver. In his youth he published some of his works under the names A. Pedajas and Mart Karus. After the Estonian War of Independence, in which he participated as a volunteer, Kivikas became one of the few writers in Estonia to experiment with futurism. However, his best works are novels and short stories dealing with war and social problems in the rural environment.

From 1941 to 1944 he served as chairman of the Estonian Writers' Union. In spring 1944, Kivikas went into exile in Finland and from there in autumn 1944 on to Sweden, where he remained until his death in Lund.

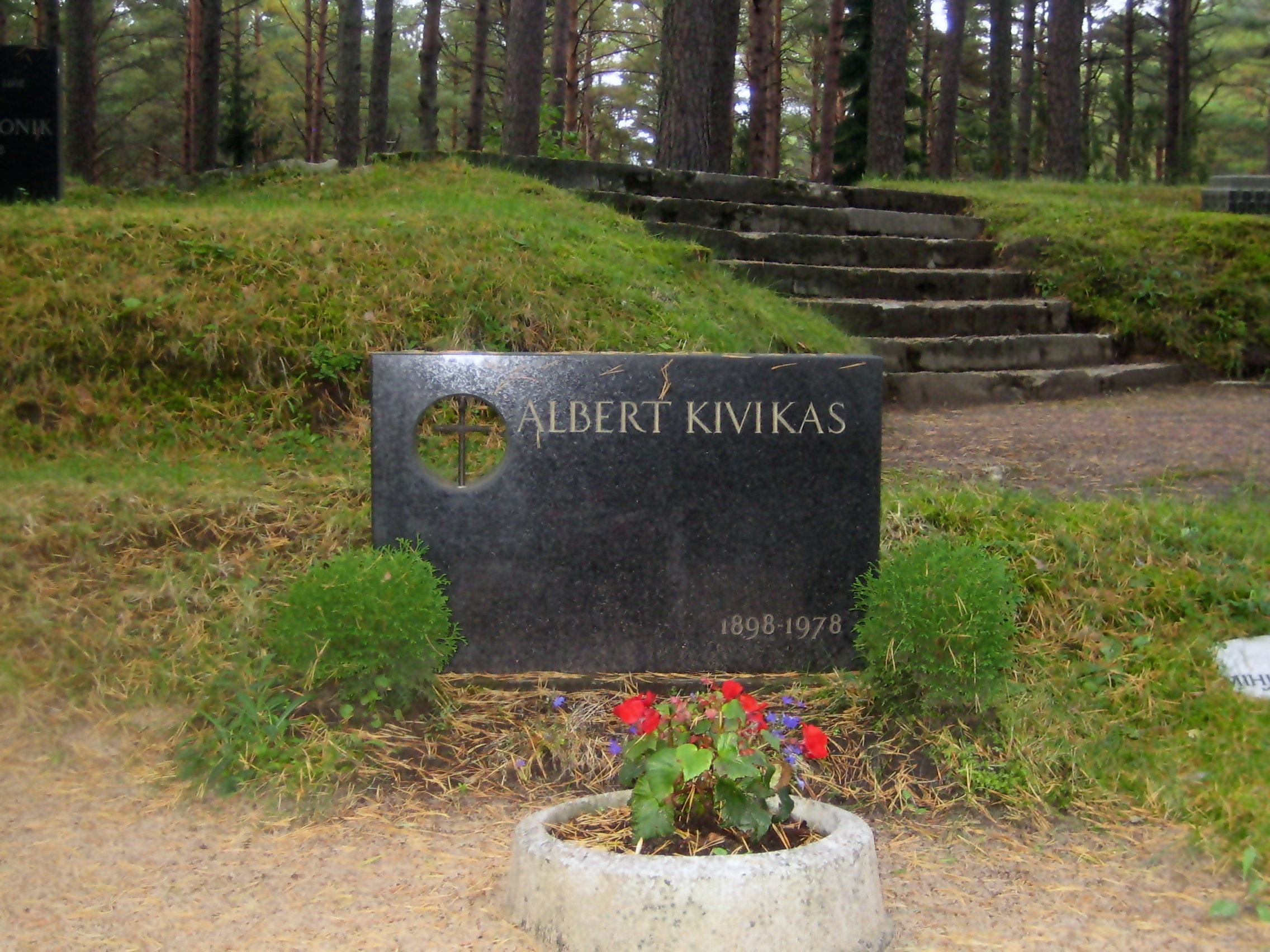
Kivikas' grave in Tallinn's Forest Cemetery
