= Priit Võigemast =

Estonian actor

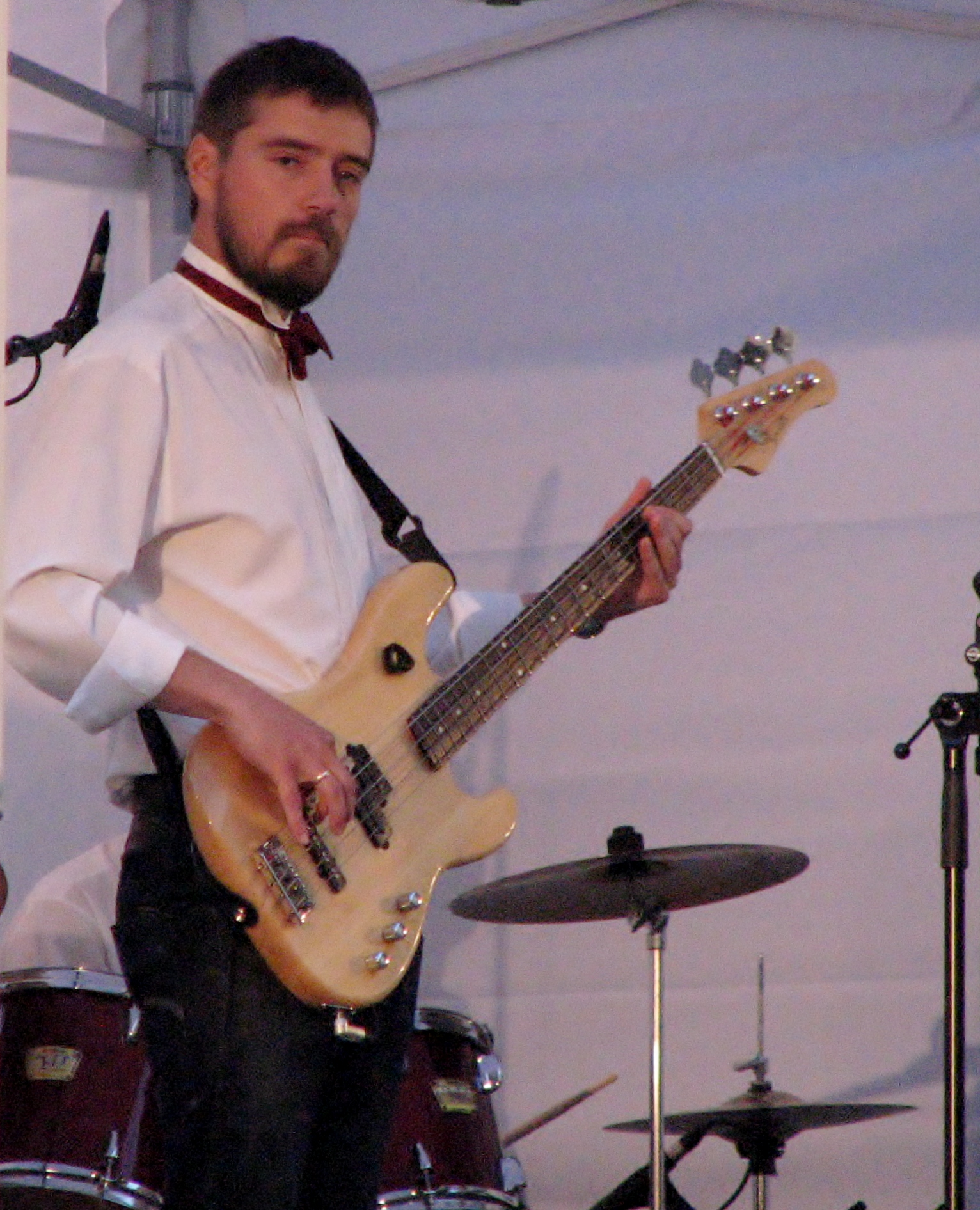
- Priit Võigemast in 2012.
- Born: 18 April 1980 (age 46); Alu, Rapla County, then part of Estonian SSR, Soviet Union
- Occupation: actor
- Years active: 2002–present
- Spouse(s): Evelin Võigemast (née Pang; divorced), Laura Võigemast (née Kalle)
- Children: 2
- Parent: Jüri Võigemast (father)

Priit Võigemast (born 18 April 1980) is an Estonian film, television and stage actor. Between 2002 and 2007 he has performed in the Ugala, Tallinna Linnateater and other theatres. He is probably best known for the role of Henn Ahas in the 2002 war drama Names in Marble. He was married to actress Evelin Võigemast.

== Biography ==
=== Theatre performances ===
- 2002: "Niskamäe kired" – Antti
- 2003: "Ullike ootamatuste saarelt" – Ingel
- 2003: "Minu pere ja muud loomad" – Gerald Durrell
- 2003: "Kevade" – Lesta
- 2003: "Koturnijad ehk Kui nalja ei saa, siis meie ei mängi" – Mees, Peremees, Põis
- 2003: "Toomas Nipernaadi" – Toomas Nipernaadi
- 2003: "Thijl Ulenspiegel" – kuningas Felipe, vaim
- 2004: "80 päevaga ümber maailma" – salapolitseinik Fax
- 2004: "Aarete saar" (Treasure Island) – Jim Hawkins
- 2005: "Suvi" – Tõnisson
- 2005: "Lõõmav pimedus" – Carlos
- 2005: "Anna Karenina" – krahv Aleksei Kirillovitsh Vronski
- 2006: "Saateviga" – Dönci
- 2006: "Kolm klaasikest kirsiviina" – erinevad rollid
- 2006: "Marilyn" – Joe DiMaggio
- 2007: "Opera Comique" - Georges Bizet
- 1999: "Hamlet" – Laertes (Linnateater)
- 1999: "Kolmekrossiooper" – Filch (Linnateater)
- 2001: "Musketärid kakskümmend aastat hiljem" – Vikont de Bragelonne (Linnateater)
- 2003: "Bent" – Rudy (Vanalinnastuudio)
- 2004: "Grease" – Danny Zuko (Nukuteater)
- 2004: "Latern" – Sass projektiteater

=== Tallinna Linnateater performances ===
- 2007: C. Gozzi "Ronk" - Smeraldina, Brighella, Ratsu
- 2007: "Karin. Indrek. Tõde ja õigus. 4." - Melesk

=== Television roles ===
- Kelgukoerad - Pulk (2010)
- Õnne 13 - Marko Reikvere (2005–2010)
- Buratino tegutseb jälle - Buratino (2003)
- Restart - Marek (2015)
- Pank - Kalju Tamm (2018)
- Alo - Viljo (2018)

=== Filmography ===
- Täna öösel me ei maga (English release title: Set Point) - Kristofer (2004)
- Nimed marmortahvlil (English: Names in Marble) - Henn Ahas (2002)
- Lotte and the Moonstone Secret - Paul the Cat (2011)
- Vasaku jala reede - Lihunik (2012)
- Väikelinna detektiivid ja Valge Daami saladus - Stig Velson (2013)
- Elavad pildid - Julius (2013)
- Teesklejad - Juhan (2016)
- Luuraja ja luuletaja (2016)
- Võta või jäta - Lawyer (2018)
- Eia jõulud Tondikakul - Oskar (2018)
- Tõde ja õigus (English: Truth and Justice) - Pearu (2019)
- O2 - Feliks Kangur (2020)
- Kalev - Riho Soonik (2022)
- Taskmaster – kuninga käsul - himself (contestant) (2026)
