= Argo Aadli =

Estonian theatre and film actor

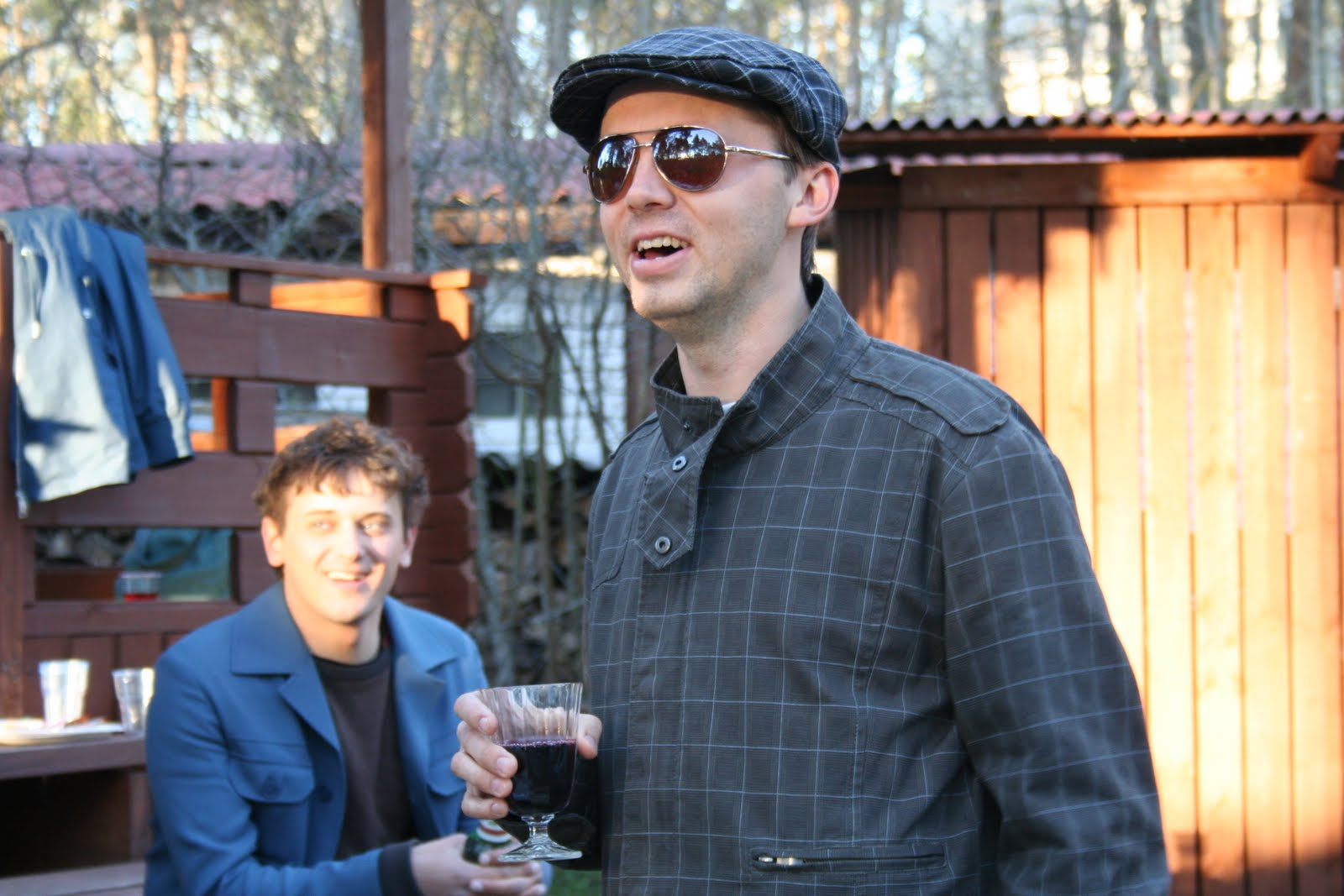
- Born: 12 April 1980 (age 46); Kunda, then part of Estonian SSR, Soviet Union
- Education: Higher Theatre School of the Estonian Academy of Music and Theatre
- Occupation: actor

Argo Aadli (born 12 April 1980) is an Estonian theatre and film actor.

== Biography ==
=== Education and career ===
Born in Kunda, Estonia, Aadli graduated from the Higher Theatre School of the Estonian Academy of Music and Theatre in 2002.

Aadli has worked as an actor in Tallinn City Theatre where he has performed at least ten productions to date, notably the character of Zahhar in the Anton Chekhov play "Pianola or The Mechanical Piano" in 2002. Aside from this he has been involved in several films including Names in Marble (2002) where he played Konsap, and Lotte from Gadgetville (2006) where he voiced Albert.

=== Theatre credits ===
- Zametov (Fyodor Dostoyevski / Elmo Nüganen Crime and punishment, 1999)
- Lauri (Aleksis Kivi Seven Brothers, 2001)
- Zahhar (Anton Chekhov Pianola or The Mechanical Piano, 2002)
- Gregor Samsa (Franz Kafka The Metamorphosis, 2004)
- Indrek Paas (A. H. Tammsaare / Elmo Nüganen Truth and Justice. Part Two., 2005)
- Ajakirjanik Pilu (A. H. Tammsaare / Elmo Nüganen "Karin. Indrek. Truth and Justice. Part Four.", 2006)

== Selected filmography ==
Year	Film	Role	Film gross	Notes
2002	Nimed marmortahvlil	Konsap	19 million EEK	
2005	Malev	Leholas		
2006	Leiutajateküla Lotte	Albert/Theodor (voice)		
2016	Luuletaja ja luuletaja	Drunk		
2018	Seltsimees laps	Ratsasõidu Jaan		
2021	Öölapsed	Gas station attendant		
2023	Kuulsuse narrid	Kaltsakas Argo		
