= 1970 in film =

The year 1970 in film involved some significant events.

== Events ==
- January 9 – Larry Fine, the second member of The Three Stooges, suffers a massive stroke, effectively ending his career.
- February 11 – The Magic Christian, starring Peter Sellers and Ringo Starr, premieres in New York City. The film's soundtrack album, including Badfinger's "Come and Get It" (written and produced by Paul McCartney), is released on Apple Records.
- March 12 – Film debut of Ornella Muti in La moglie più bella (The Most Beautiful Wife) 3 days after her 15th birthday.
- March 17 – The controversial film The Boys in the Band, directed by William Friedkin and based on Mart Crowley's hit off-Broadway play, opens in theaters.
- July – Stanley R. Jaffe appointed as president of Paramount Pictures, succeeding Charles Bludhorn who remained chairman and CEO.
- October 24 – Joan Crawford's final film, the low-budget horror picture Trog, opens in the US and UK.
- December 1 – Yousuf Khan Sher Bano is the first Pashto film to be released in Pakistan.
- December 14 – John Lennon and Yoko Ono film Up Your Legs Forever with 367 participants in New York City.
- December 16 – Love Story is released to theaters. Not only that it becomes the highest-grossing film of the year, it also launches the career of Tommy Lee Jones and its iconic theme song ("(Where Do I Begin?) Love Story") made it a cultural phenomenon of the 1970s.
- The IMAX motion picture projection system premieres at the Fuji Pavilion, at Expo '70 in Osaka, Japan.
- In Culver City, California, MGM begins selling off its studio back lot property and movie props.

== Awards ==
Category/Organization	28th Golden Globe Awards February 5, 1971		24th BAFTA Awards March 4, 1971	43rd Academy Awards April 15, 1971
Category/Organization	Drama	Musical or Comedy	24th BAFTA Awards March 4, 1971	43rd Academy Awards April 15, 1971
Best Film	Love Story	M*A*S*H	Butch Cassidy and the Sundance Kid	Patton
Best Director	Arthur Hiller; Love Story		George Roy Hill; Butch Cassidy and the Sundance Kid	Franklin J. Schaffner; Patton
Best Actor	George C. Scott; Patton	Albert Finney; Scrooge	Robert Redford; Butch Cassidy and the Sundance Kid; Downhill Racer; Tell Them Willie Boy Is Here	George C. Scott; Patton
Best Actress	Ali MacGraw; Love Story	Carrie Snodgress; Diary of a Mad Housewife	Katharine Ross; Butch Cassidy and the Sundance Kid; Tell Them Willie Boy Is Here	Glenda Jackson; Women in Love
Best Supporting Actor	John Mills; Ryan's Daughter		Colin Welland; Kes	John Mills; Ryan's Daughter
Best Supporting Actress	Karen Black; Five Easy Pieces; Maureen Stapleton; Airport		Susannah York; They Shoot Horses, Don't They?	Helen Hayes; Airport
Best Screenplay, Adapted	Erich Segal; Love Story		William Goldman; Butch Cassidy and the Sundance Kid	Ring Lardner Jr. M*A*S*H
Best Screenplay, Original	Erich Segal; Love Story		William Goldman; Butch Cassidy and the Sundance Kid	Francis Ford Coppola and Edmund H. North; Patton
Best Original Score	Francis Lai; Love Story		N/A	Francis Lai; Love Story; The Beatles; Let It Be
Best Original Song	"Whistling Away The Dark"; Darling Lili		N/A	"For All We Know"; Lovers and Other Strangers
Best Foreign Language Film	Rider on the Rain		N/A	Investigation of a Citizen Above Suspicion
Best Documentary	N/A	N/A	Sad Song of Yellow Skin	Woodstock

Cannes Film Festival (Palme d'Or):

M*A*S*H, directed by Robert Altman, United States

== Highest-grossing films (U.S.) ==
The top ten 1970 released films by box office gross in North America are as follows:

Highest-grossing films of 1970
Rank	Title	Distributor	Domestic rentals
1	Love Story	Paramount	$50,000,000
2	Airport	Universal	$44,500,000
3	M*A*S*H	20th Century Fox	$30,000,000
4	Patton	20th Century Fox	$27,000,000
5	Woodstock	Warner Bros.	$16,400,000
6	Little Big Man	National General Pictures	$15,000,000
7	Tora! Tora! Tora!	20th Century Fox/Toei	$13,700,000
8	Ryan's Daughter	MGM	$13,400,000
9	Catch-22	Paramount	$12,300,000
10	The Owl and the Pussycat	Columbia	$11,500,000

== 1970 films ==
=== By country/region ===
- List of American films of 1970
- List of Argentine films of 1970
- List of Australian films of 1970
- List of Bangladeshi films of 1970
- List of British films of 1970
- List of Canadian films of 1970
- List of French films of 1970
- List of Hong Kong films of 1970
- List of Indian films of 1970
  - List of Hindi films of 1970
  - List of Kannada films of 1970
  - List of Malayalam films of 1970
  - List of Marathi films of 1970
  - List of Tamil films of 1970
  - List of Telugu films of 1970
- List of Japanese films of 1970
- List of Mexican films of 1970
- List of Pakistani films of 1970
- List of South Korean films of 1970
- List of Soviet films of 1970
- List of Spanish films of 1970

=== By genre/medium ===
- List of action films of 1970
- List of animated feature films of 1970
- List of avant-garde films of 1970
- List of comedy films of 1970
- List of drama films of 1970
- List of horror films of 1970
- List of science fiction films of 1970
- List of thriller films of 1970
- List of western films of 1970

== Births ==
- January 1
  - Julio Cesar Cedillo, Mexican actor
  - Gabriel Jarret, American actor
  - John Moore, Irish director and producer
- January 4 - Josh Stamberg, American actor
- January 7 - Doug E. Doug, American actor, comedian, screenwriter, producer and director
- January 17 - Genndy Tartakovsky, Russian-American animator, director, producer, screenwriter, voice actor and storyboard artist
- January 19
  - Essie Davis, Australian actress and singer
  - Kipp Marcus, American actor, screenwriter and producer
- January 20
  - Branka Katić, Serbian actress
  - Skeet Ulrich, American actor
- January 21 - Ken Leung, American actor
- January 24 – Matthew Lillard, American actor, voice actor, director and producer
- January 27 - Todd Louiso, American actor and director
- January 29 – Heather Graham, American actress
- January 31 - Minnie Driver, English actress
- February 1 - C. Ernst Harth, Canadian character actor
- February 3 - Matt Winston, American actor
- February 8 - Stephanie Courtney, American actress and comedian
- February 14 - Simon Pegg, English actor
- February 16 - Scott Yaphe, Canadian actor and comedian
- February 17
  - Michael Hyatt, American actress
  - Dominic Purcell, Australian actor
- February 18 - Susan Egan, American actress, voice actress, singer and dancer
- February 22
  - Nicole Oliver, Canadian actress
  - Jeremy Shamos, American actor
- February 23 – Niecy Nash, American actress, comedian and television host
- February 24 – Jonathan Ward, American retired actor
- February 25 - Heather Simms, American actress
- March 2 - Alexander Armstrong, English actor, comedian, television personality, television presenter and singer
- March 3 - Julie Bowen, American actress
- March 4
  - Sergio Basáñez, Mexican actor
  - Will Keen, English actor
  - Angela V. Shelton, American actress and comedian
- March 5 - Rimantė Valiukaitė, Lithuanian actress
- March 6 - Dan Põldroos, Estonian actor (d. 2007)
- March 7 - Rachel Weisz, English actress
- March 8
  - Meredith Scott Lynn, American actress, producer and director
  - Jed Rees, Canadian actor
- March 13 - Tim Story, American filmmaker
- March 18 – Queen Latifah, American actress and rapper
- March 20
  - Linda Larkin, American actress and voice actress
  - Michael Rapaport, American actor and comedian
- March 24
  - Lauren Bowles, American actress
  - Lara Flynn Boyle, American actress and producer
  - Robbie Gee, British actor
  - Taizo Harada, Japanese actor and comedian
- March 28 - Vince Vaughn, American actor
- March 31 - Damon Herriman, Australian actor
- April 4 - Barry Pepper, Canadian actor
- April 7 - Ivelin Giro, Cuban-American actress
- April 11 - Johnny Messner, American actor
- April 12 - Retta, American stand-up comedian and actress
- April 13 - Ricky Schroder, American actor
- April 15 - Flex Alexander, American actor and comedian
- April 21
  - Rob Riggle, American actor, comedian, and marine
  - Nicole Sullivan, American actress, voice artist and comedian
- April 22 - Mireille Soria, American producer
- April 24 - Kiff VandenHeuvel, American actor and director
- April 25
  - Jonathan Brugh, New Zealand comedian, actor and musician
  - Jason Lee, American actor, comedian, and professional skateboarder
- April 29
  - Paweł Deląg, Polish actor
  - Uma Thurman, American actress
- May 1 - Dave Willis, American actor, writer, animator, producer, and voice actor
- May 2
  - Golda Rosheuvel, British actress and singer
  - Matt Gerald, American actor and screenwriter
- May 3 - Bobby Cannavale, American actor
- May 4 - Will Arnett, Canadian actor
- May 6 - Tristán Ulloa, Spanish actor, writer and director
- May 9 - Helen Hill, American animator (d. 2007)
- May 10 - Dallas Roberts, American actor
- May 11 - Nicky Katt, American and Mexican actor (d. 2025)
- May 12
  - Samantha Mathis, American actress
  - Larry Rickles, American screenwriter and producer (d. 2011)
  - Nae Yūki, Japanese actress and singer
- May 13 - Catherine Lough Haggquist, Canadian actress and producer
- May 18 - Tina Fey, American comedian, screenwriter, producer, and actress
- May 19 - Jason Gray-Stanford, Canadian actor
- May 20 - Sally Phillips, English actress, television presenter and comedian
- May 21 - Seth Morris, American actor, comedian and writer
- May 22
  - Naomi Campbell, English model and actress
  - Ayberk Pekcan, Turkish actor (d. 2022)
- May 23 - Nanette Burstein, American director, producer, and screenwriter
- May 25
  - Jamie Kennedy, American actor, screenwriter, stand-up comedian and television producer
  - Octavia Spencer, American actress
- May 26 - John Hamburg, American writer and director
- May 27 - Joseph Fiennes, English actor
- May 28 - Glenn Quinn, Irish actor (d. 2002)
- June 1 - Paula Malcomson, North Irish actress
- June 4 - Izabella Scorupco, Polish-Swedish actress and singer
- June 8 - Seu Jorge, Brazilian musical artist, songwriter and actor
- June 15
  - Justin Fletcher, English comedian, children's television presenter
  - Leah Remini, American actress, author and activist
- June 16 - Clifton Collins Jr., American actor
- June 17 - Will Forte, American actor and comedian
- June 22
  - Richard Yearwood, Canadian actor
  - Michael Trucco, American actor
- June 24 - Andres Raag, Estonian actor
- June 26
  - Paul Thomas Anderson, American filmmaker
  - Sean Hayes, American actor and comedian
  - Matt Letscher, American actor and director
  - Chris O'Donnell, American actor
  - Nick Offerman, American actor, writer, comedian and producer
- June 28
  - Rio Hackford, American actor (d. 2022)
  - Mike White, American writer, actor and producer
- June 30 - Brian Bloom, American actor and screenwriter
- July 2 - Scott Aukerman, American writer, actor, comedian, director and producer
- July 3 - Audra McDonald, American actress and singer
- July 4 - Lewis MacLeod, Scottish actor and voice actor
- July 11- Justin Chambers, American actor
- July 12 - Lee Byung-hun, South Korean actor
- July 13 - Sharon Horgan, Irish actress, writer, director, producer and comedian
- July 14
  - Catherine Curtin, American actress
  - Mike McFarland, American voice actor
  - Nina Siemaszko, American actress
- July 16 - Apichatpong Weerasethakul, Thai film director
- July 17 - Gary Gulman, American stand-up comedian and actor
- July 21 - Alysia Reiner, American actress
- July 22 - Jonathan Zaccaï, Belgian actor, director and screenwriter
- July 23 - Charisma Carpenter, American actress
- July 24 - Velibor Topić, Bosnian-British actor
- July 27
  - Nikolaj Coster-Waldau, Danish actor and producer
  - Tamie Sheffield, American actress
- July 30 - Christopher Nolan, English-American film director, producer and writer
- August 1 - Jennifer Gareis, American actress
- August 2 - Kevin Smith, American filmmaker, actor and comedian
- August 3 - Thierry Neuvic, French actor
- August 4 - Ron Lester, American actor (d. 2016)
- August 6 - M. Night Shyamalan, American film director, writer, producer and actor
- August 9 - Thomas Lennon, American actor, comedian, screenwriter, producer and director
- August 10 - Francesco De Vito, Italian actor
- August 15
  - Anthony Anderson, American actor
  - Maddie Corman, American actress
- August 16
  - Saif Ali Khan, Indian actor
  - Kaili Närep, Estonian actress
- August 17 - Rupert Degas, British-Australian actor
- August 18 - Malcolm-Jamal Warner, American actor (d. 2025)
- August 18 - Scott Waugh, American director, producer and editor
- August 21 - Marc Evan Jackson, American comedian and actor
- August 23
  - Jay Mohr, American actor and comedian
  - River Phoenix, American actor (d. 1993)
- August 25 - Claudia Schiffer, German model and actress
- August 26 - Melissa McCarthy, American actress, comedian and film producer
- August 29 - Alessandra Negrini, Brazilian actress
- August 31 - Debbie Gibson, American singer and actress
- September 2 - Jesse Burch, American actor
- September 3
  - Maria Bamford, American stand-up comedian, actress and voice actress
  - Drena De Niro, American actress and filmmaker
- September 4 - Ione Skye, British-born American actress
- September 5 - Johnny Vegas, English comedian, actor, writer and director
- September 7
  - Tom Everett Scott, American actor
  - Monique Gabriela Curnen, American actress
  - N'Bushe Wright, American actress
- September 10 - Tim Plester, British actor and filmmaker
- September 11
  - Taraji P. Henson, American actress
  - Laura Wright, American actress
- September 12
  - Pippa Grandison, Australian actress and singer
  - Josh Hopkins, American actor
- September 13 - Louise Lombard, English actress
- September 16 - Knowl Johnson, American actor
- September 18 - Gina Shay, American producer
- September 19 - Victor Williams, American actor
- September 22 - Rupert Penry-Jones, British actor
- September 28 - David Wills, American voice actor
- September 29 - Emily Lloyd, English actress
- September 30
  - Tony Hale, American actor
  - Dragan Mićanović, Serbian actor
  - Alistair Petrie, British actor
- October 1 - Gerald Downey, American actor
- October 2
  - Catherine Kellner, American character actress
  - Kelly Ripa, American actress and television host
  - Maribel Verdú, Spanish actress
- October 3 - Kirsten Nelson, American actress and director
- October 5 - Josie Bissett, American actress
- October 7 - Nicole Ari Parker, American actress and model
- October 8
  - Matt Damon, American actor
  - Anne-Marie Duff, English actress and narrator
- October 9 - Jason Butler Harner, American actor
- October 12
  - Cody Cameron, American voice actor and director
  - Kirk Cameron, American actor
  - Cláudia Abreu, Brazilian actress
- October 14 - Jon Seda, American actor
- October 15
  - Noel Gugliemi, American actor
  - Zak Orth, American actor
- October 17 - J. C. MacKenzie, Canadian actor
- October 18 - Mike Mitchell, American director, writer, producer, actor and animator
- October 19 - Chris Kattan, American actor and comedian
- October 21 - Autumn de Wilde, American photographer and film director
- October 22 - Amy Redford, American actress, director and producer
- October 24 - Raul Esparza, American actor
- October 25
  - Adam Goldberg, American character actor, filmmaker and musician
  - Adam Pascal, American actor, singer and musician
- October 26 - Lisa Ryder, Canadian actress
- October 28 - Greg Eagles, American actor, producer and writer
- October 29 - Michael Daingerfield, Canadian actor
- October 30 - Nia Long, American actress
- October 31
  - Rob Letterman, American director and screenwriter
  - Nolan North, American actor and voice actor
- November 1 - Merle Palmiste, Estonian actress
- November 6 - Ethan Hawke, American actor
- November 7 - Morgan Spurlock, American filmmaker and screenwriter (d. 2024)
- November 10 - Vince Vieluf, American actor
- November 12
  - Aitor Iturrioz, Mexican actor
  - Michael Greco, British actor
  - Craig Parker, New Zealand actor
- November 13 - José María Yazpik, Mexican actor
- November 15 - Danny Sapani, British actor
- November 16 - Martha Plimpton, American actress
- November 18
  - Mike Epps, American stand-up comedian, producer and actor
  - Peta Wilson, Australian actress and model
- November 20 - Melissa Disney, American voice actress and writer
- November 22 - Joe Son, South Korean-born American former actor
- November 23
  - Oded Fehr, Israeli actor
  - Danny Hoch, American actor, writer and director
- November 24 - Madis Milling, Estonian actor and presenter (d. 2022)
- November 27 - Brooke Langton, American actress
- November 29 - Larry Joe Campbell, American actor and comedian
- November 30
  - Kristin Dattilo, American actress
  - Perrey Reeves, American actress
- December 1
  - Jouko Ahola, Finnish powerlifter and actor
  - Sarah Silverman, American stand-up comedian, actress, singer and writer
- December 2 - Joe Lo Truglio, American actor, comedian, writer and producer
- December 4 - Kevin Sussman, American actor and comedian
- December 5 - Adam Levy, British actor
- December 6 - Rowena King, British actress
- December 12
  - Jennifer Connelly, American actress
  - Regina Hall, American actress
- December 13 - Bart Johnson, American actor
- December 17 - Sean Patrick Thomas, American actor
- December 18
  - Gero Camilo, Brazilian actor and singer-songwriter
  - Victoria Pratt, Canadian actress and model
- December 20
  - Nicole de Boer, Canadian actress
  - Todd Phillips, American director, producer and screenwriter
- December 23 - Anatole Taubman, Swiss actor
- December 24 - Amaury Nolasco, Puerto Rican actor and producer
- December 25 - Andy Fickman, American filmmaker
- December 28 - Elaine Hendrix, American actress
- December 31 - Chandra West, Canadian actress

== Deaths ==
- January 7 - Jack Natteford, 75, American screenwriter, 1,000 Dollars a Minute, Black Bart
- January 19 - Hal March, 49, American actor, Hear Me Good, Send Me No Flowers
- January 23 - Nell Shipman, 77, Canadian actress, writer, producer, Back to God's Country, The Grub-Stake
- January 25 - Eiji Tsuburaya, 68, Japanese film director and special effects designer, Godzilla, Godzilla, King of the Monsters!
- January 27 - Rocco D'Assunta, 65, Italian actor, comedian and playwright
- February 6 - Roscoe Karns, 76, American actor, It Happened One Night, Alibi Ike
- February 19 - Jules Munshin, 54, American actor, On the Town, Take Me Out to the Ball Game
- February 24 - Conrad Nagel, 72, American actor, All That Heaven Allows, The Divorcee
- March 4 - Peter Godfrey, 70, British director, Christmas in Connecticut, The Two Mrs. Carrolls
- March 6 - William Hopper, 55, American actor, Rebel Without a Cause, Track of the Cat
- March 23 - Del Lord, 75, Canadian pioneer Hollywood director, A Plumbing We Will Go, All the World's a Stooge
- March 25 - Virginia Van Upp, 68, American producer and screenwriter, Gilda, Cover Girl
- March 26 - Patricia Ellis, 51, American actress, A Night at the Ritz, Rhythm in the Clouds
- April 9 - Cobina Wright, 82, American singer and actress, The Razor's Edge, Footlight Serenade
- April 11 - Cathy O'Donnell, 46, American actress, Ben-Hur, The Best Years of Our Lives
- April 18
  - Gay Seabrook, 69, American actress, Bedtime Worries, Wild Poses
  - Glenn Tryon, 71, American actor and director, Lonesome, Miss Mink of 1949
- April 19 - George Blair, 64, American director, Duke of Chicago, Streets of San Francisco
- April 21 - Jose Corazon de Jesus Jr., 45, Filipino actor, Garrison 13, Higit Sa Lahat
- April 25 - Anita Louise, 55, American actress, The Little Princess, The Story of Louis Pasteur
- April 26 - Gypsy Rose Lee, 59, American burlesque performer and actress, Screaming Mimi, Belle of the Yukon
- April 28 - Ed Begley, 69, American actor, 12 Angry Men, Patterns
- April 30 - Inger Stevens, 35, Swedish actress, Hang 'Em High, A Guide for the Married Man
- May 10 - Mari Blanchard, 43, American actress, Destry, She-Devil
- May 14 - Billie Burke, 85, American actress, The Wizard of Oz, Father's Little Dividend
- May 17 - Nigel Balchin, 61, British screenwriter, The Man Who Never Was, 23 Paces to Baker Street
- May 21 - Vinton Hayworth, 63, American actor, playwright, screenwriter, Danger on Wheels, Enemy Agent
- May 22 - Mahmoud Zulfikar, 56, Egyptian director, screenwriter, Aghla Min Hayati, Soft Hands
- May 23 - Nydia Westman, 68, American actress, Ladies Should Listen, Dressed to Thrill
- June 4 - Sonny Tufts, 58, American actor, The Virginian, Government Girl
- June 11 - Frank Silvera, 55, Jamaica-born American actor, Viva Zapata!, Hombre
- June 14 - William Daniels, 68, American cinematographer, Camille, Ninotchka
- July 6 - Marjorie Rambeau, 80, American actress, A Man Called Peter, Tobacco Road
- July 9 - Sigrid Holmquist, 71, Swedish actress, Just Around the Corner, Meddling Women
- July 11 - Andreas Malandrinos, 81, Greek actor
- July 14 - Preston Foster, 69, American actor, The Informer, I Am a Fugitive from a Chain Gang
- July 22 - Fritz Kortner, 78, German director, Pandora's Box, The Razor's Edge
- July 26 - Claud Allister, 81, English actor, Lady Luck, The Trial of Mary Dugan
- August 1 - Frances Farmer, 56, American actress, Come and Get It, The Toast of New York
- September 3 - Vasil Gendov, 78, Bulgarian film director, actor and screenwriter, Bulgaran is Gallant
- September 11 - Chester Morris, 69, American actor, Meet Boston Blackie, Five Came Back
- September 18 - Jimi Hendrix, 27, American musician, Almost Famous, Wayne's World
- September 29 - Edward Everett Horton, 84, American actor, Arsenic and Old Lace, Top Hat
- October 2 - Grethe Weiser, 67, German actress, My Friend Barbara, Lemke's Widow
- October 4 - Janis Joplin, 27, American singer, Watchmen, Three Kings
- October 17 - Vola Vale, 73, American actress, The Phantom of the Opera
- October 20 - Patrick Wymark, 44, British actor, Battle of Britain, Where Eagles Dare
- October 21 – Ernest Haller, 74, American cinematographer, Gone with the Wind, Mildred Pierce
- November 1 – Hertha Feiler, 54, Austrian actress Woman in the River, Rembrandt, Charley's Aunt
- November 2 – Fernand Gravey, 64, French actor, The King and the Chorus Girl, The Great Waltz
- November 17 – Naunton Wayne, 69, British actor, Crook's Tour, Dead of Night
- November 25 – Louise Glaum, 82, American actress, Greater Than Love, Sex
- December 2 – Pat Flaherty, 73, American actor, Convict's Code, The Cobra Strikes
- December 12
  - Carolyn Craig, 36, American actress, House on Haunted Hill, Portland Exposé
  - George Terwilliger, 88, American director and screenwriter, The Fatal Hour, Bride's Play
- December 23 – Charles Ruggles, 84, American actor, Bringing Up Baby, The Parent Trap
- December 30 – Lenore Ulric, 78, American actress, Notorious, Camille
- December 31 – Suzanne Dalbert, 43, French actress, Mark of the Gorilla, The 49th Man

== Film debuts ==
- Isabelle Adjani – Le Petit bougnat
- Jane Alexander – The Great White Hope
- Carmen Argenziano – Cover Me Babe
- Linda Blair – The Way We Live Now
- Nick Cassavetes – Husbands
- Dennis Christopher – Didn't You Hear?
- Frances de la Tour – Every Home Should Have One
- Danny DeVito – Dreams of Glass
- George DiCenzo – House of Dark Shadows
- Robert Downey Jr. – Pound
- Alice Drummond – Where's Poppa?
- Shelley Duvall – Brewster McCloud
- Jayne Eastwood – Goin' Down the Road
- Erik Estrada – The Cross and the Switchblade
- George Buck Flower – Norma
- Scott Glenn – The Baby Maker
- Pam Grier – Beyond the Valley of the Dolls
- Philip Baker Hall – Cowards
- Dan Hedaya – Myra Breckinridge
- Ken Howard – Tell Me That You Love Me, Junie Moon
- Peter Jason – Rio Lobo
- Don Johnson – The Magic Garden of Stanley Sweetheart
- Jeffrey Jones – The Revolutionary
- Tommy Lee Jones – Love Story
- Diane Keaton – Lovers and Other Strangers
- Frank Langella – Diary of a Mad Housewife
- Darrell Larson – The Student Nurses
- Michael Lerner – Alex in Wonderland
- Stephen McHattie – The People Next Door
- Anne Meara – The Out-of-Towners
- Garrett Morris – Where's Poppa?
- Ornella Muti – The Most Beautiful Wife
- Stephen Rea – Cry of the Banshee
- Susan Sarandon – Joe
- John Schuck – M*A*S*H
- Arnold Schwarzenegger – Hercules in New York
- Tom Selleck – Myra Breckinridge
- Pepe Serna – The Student Nurses
- Sam Shepard – Brand X
- Sab Shimono – Loving
- Paul Sorvino – Where's Poppa?
- Jerry Stiller – Lovers and Other Strangers
- Fred Williamson – M*A*S*H
- Burt Young – Carnival of Blood
- Harris Yulin – End of the Road
