= Dan Põldroos =

Estonian actor (1970–2007)

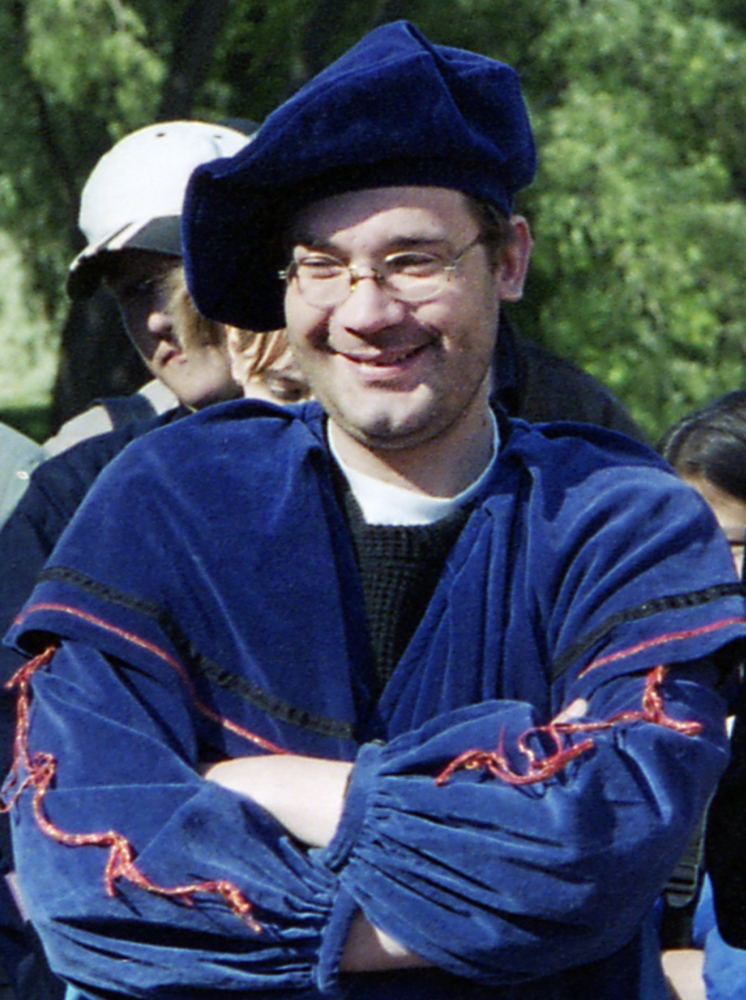
- Põldroos in 1998
- Born: 6 March 1970; Tallinn, then part of Estonian SSR, Soviet Union
- Died: 5 May 2007 (aged 37); Tallinn, Estonia
- Resting place: Metsakalmistu, Tallinn
- Occupation: Actor
- Years active: 1985–2007
- Spouse: Ketlin Bachmann
- Children: 1

Dan Põldroos (6 March 1970 – 5 May 2007) was an Estonian stage, television and film actor who began performing on stage at age fifteen. Although mostly known for comedic roles, he was also an accomplished dramatic actor. Põldroos' career ended at age thirty-seven when he died unexpectedly.

== Early life and education ==
Dan Põldroos was born in Tallinn. He was an only child from his parents' marriage, though he had a half-sibling and a step-sibling. His grandfather's brother was actor, writer, and director Priit Põldroos. As a hobby at age fifteen, he began performing with the Varius theatre in Tallinn. He attended schools in Tallinn, graduating as a carpenter and cabinet-maker from the Tallinn 12th Vocational Secondary School in 1988 and the same year he enrolled in the Performing Arts Department of the Tallinn State Conservatory (now, the Estonian Academy of Music and Theatre), studying under instruction of theatre and film director Kalju Komissarov, and graduating in 1992. Among his graduating classmates were: Merle Palmiste, Kristel Leesmend, Andres Raag, Kaili Närep, Jaanus Rohumaa, Üllar Saaremäe, Ivo Uukkivi, Sten Zupping, Tiina Mälberg and Garmen Tabor.

== Career ==
=== Theatre ===
While still attending the Tallinn Conservatory, in 1991 he began an engagement at the Ugala theatre in Viljandi. After a year with the Ugala, he began an engagement at the Estonian Drama Theatre in Tallinn that lasted from 1992 until 1999. Among his more memorable stage roles include those in works by such authors and playwrights as: Henrik Ibsen, Truman Capote, Andrus Kivirähk, Ray Cooney, Eduard Vilde, Brian O'Nolan, Tony Kushner, Molière, and Gustaf Fröding. In 1999, Põldroos left the theatre and briefly worked as a teacher at a primary school in Nõmme.

=== Film ===
In 1992, Dan Põldroos appeared in his first feature-length film as the character Filip in the Lembit Ulfsak-directed family-comedy Lammas all paremas nurgas. In 1994, he played the role of Günter in the Jaan Kolberg-directed biographical drama film Jüri Rumm about the 19th-century Estonian folk hero, itinerant thief and robber Rummu Jüri. In 2006, he appeared as the character Leif in the Katrin Laur-directed family-comedy film Ruudi. Põldroos' last film appearance was a role in the Andres Maimik and Rain Tolk-directed comedy Jan Uuspõld läheb Tartusse, which Estonian actor and singer Jan Uuspõld as a down-on-his-luck caricature of himself trying to hitchhike from Tallinn to Tartu to perform in a role at the Vanemuine theatre.

=== Television ===
Põldroos began his television career as an actor in a minor role in an episode of the Swedish television drama mini-series Fallet Paragon in 1994. The following year he was cast in the EVTV (now, TV3) television drama series V.E.R.I.; in which he would appear as a cast member on the series until 1997. In 1996, he appeared in the role of Anatoli in two episodes of the Finnish crime-drama television mini-series Sergein totuus. In 1999, he co-hosted the Kanal 2 game show TV-Oksjon with former Tallinn Conservatory classmate Merle Palmiste. In 2001, he was cast in a starring role in the short-lived television action series Kodumaa parim poeg ehk eriagent 1188.

Põldroos' most popular television roles are, arguably, those in the several Mart Juur and Andrus Kivirähk-penned Kanal 2 comedy series alongside friend Jan Uuspõld and an ensemble of other comedic actors. In 1998, he joined the cast of Wigla show, staying with the series until it ended in 2000. From 2001 until 2003, he appeared in the series Wremja, and in 2006 appeared in the series follow-up Sipelga 14. All three series shared common themes and the multiple characters – performed by just several actors – were often outrageously grotesque and bizarre. Põldroos' characters included Uuno Nisu/Nisu Unn, an alcoholic World War II veteran who fought for Germany and burned Adolf Hitler's corpse in 1945; Maali, a sadistic mother-in-law; Aiku, a teenage rullnokk (an Estonian hoodlum, akin to a chav); Eints, a comedian; Feeliks Raudjalg/Lieutenant colonel Ivanov, a lecher who pretends to be crippled and an Estonian freedom fighter who, in reality, was a spy for the KGB; and Inspektor Valdek Kukeke, a corrupt and incompetent policeman, among others.

In 2007, Põldroos joined the cast of the comedy-parody series Täna Õhtul Leo Põld, which caused a measure of controversy, as the series lampooned the early-1980s Eesti Televisioon (ETV) children's television series Kõige suurem sõber; depicting some of the central characters from that series in adult-themed scenarios. Several episodes were filmed, but the series was not broadcast, due to objections from the public, Eesti Rahvusringhääling (Estonian Public Broadcasting) copyright violation claims, and Põldroos' death.

== Personal life and death ==
Dan Põldroos was married to clothing designer Ketlin Bachmann-Põldroos. The couple had one daughter, Aleksandra, born in November 2006.

On 5 May 2007, Põldroos died in his sleep of natural causes at the family's home in Tallinn at age 37. He had struggled with alcoholism during his adult life. He was buried in Forest Cemetery in Tallinn's Pirita district on 12 May 2007.

In 2011, author and theatre critic Pille-Riin Purje penned a biography of Põldroos titled Aitab naljast! Legend Dan Põldroosist, published by Fookus Meedia in Tallinn.
