= Ivo Uukkivi =

Estonian actor and singer (born 1965)

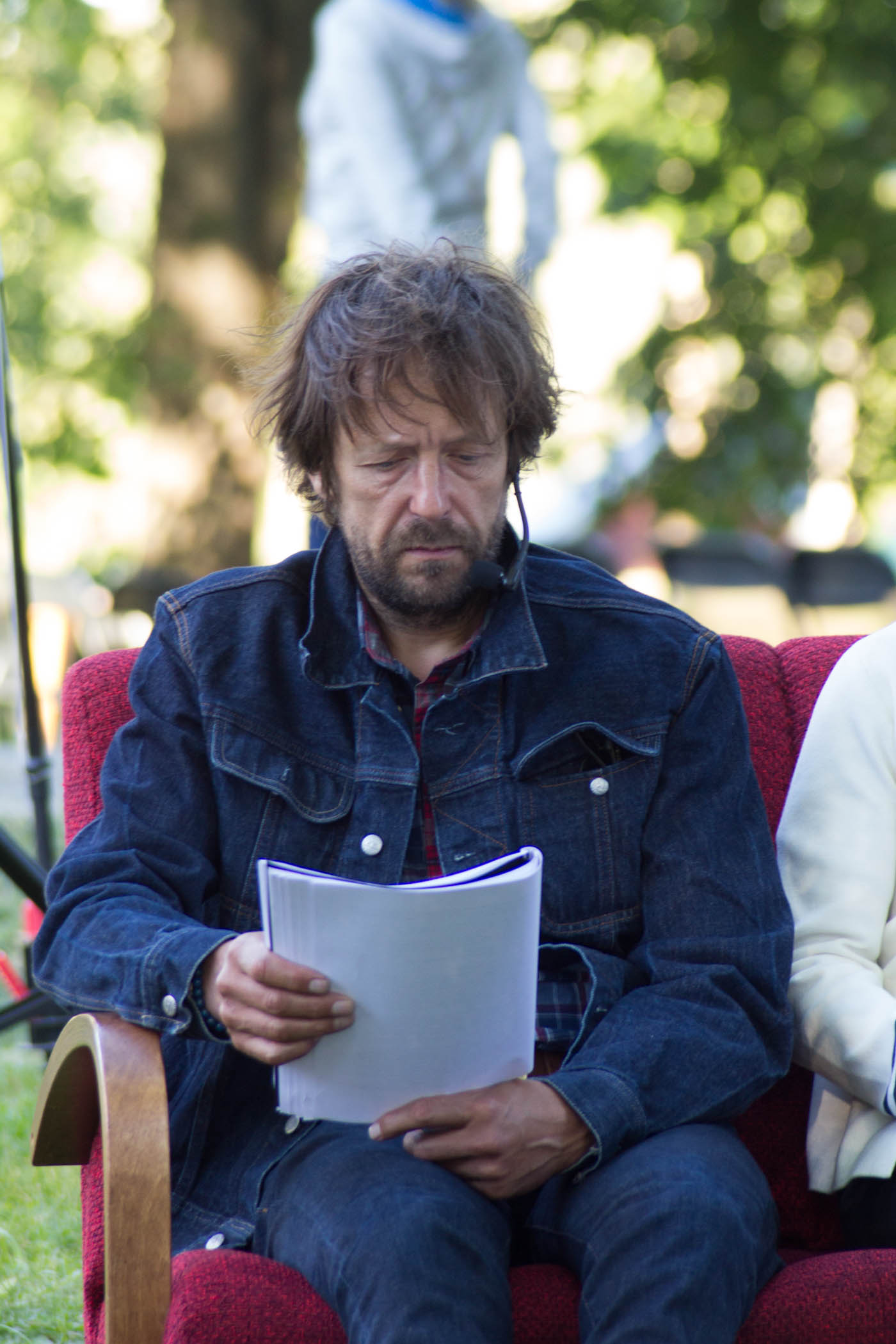
- Uukkivi in 2015
- Born: 11 October 1965 (age 61); Tallinn, Estonia
- Other name: Munk
- Occupations: Actor, singer, television producer
- Years active: 1980–present
- Partner: Mari-Liis Lill
- Children: 2

Ivo Uukkivi (born 11 October 1965) is an Estonian stage, film, radio, and television actor, television producer and, under the nickname Munk, founder of and singer with the punk band Velikije Luki.

== Early life and education ==
Ivo Uukkivi was born in Tallinn. He was one of two siblings. He is a 1980 graduate of Tallinn 2nd Secondary School (now, Tallinn Secondary School of Science). Afterward, he attended Tallinn Polytechnic School (now, Tallinn College of Technology), graduating in 1984. He is a 1992 graduate of the Tallinn Conservatory's (now, the Estonian Academy of Music and Theatre) Performing Arts Department. Uukkivi's diploma production roles include Snug in William Shakespeare's A Midsummer Night's Dream and Man in Purple in Mati Unt's Emperor Nero's Private Life. Among his graduating classmates were Merle Palmiste, Kristel Leesmend, Andres Raag, Kaili Närep, Jaanus Rohumaa, Üllar Saaremäe, Dan Põldroos, Sten Zupping, Tiina Mälberg and Garmen Tabor.

== Career ==
=== Stage ===
In 1991, Uukkivi made his stage debut at Tallinn's Estonian Drama Theatre in a production of Luigi Pirandello's Six Characters in Search of an Author. In 1992, he would begin an engagement as an actor at the theatre, where he is still currently employed. Uukkivi's stage debut as an actor formally engaged at the theatre was as Manuel in a production of Neil Simon's The Gingerbread Lady. During his long career at the Estonian Drama Theatre, he has appeared in over seventy roles in stage productions of works by such varied international authors and playwrights as: Yasmina Reza, Eugene O'Neill, Michel de Ghelderode, Sławomir Mrożek, Tankred Dorst, Henrik Ibsen, Frank Wedekind, Peter Shaffer, Tony Kushner, Charles Dickens, J. B. Priestley, Ray Cooney, Ayn Rand, Arthur Miller, Evgeny Schwartz, Brian Friel, Pedro Calderón de la Barca, Victor Pelevin, Roald Dahl, Ivan Turgenev, Juan Rulfo, Lyle Kessler, Tom Stoppard, and Anton Chekhov, among others. Among his more memorable performances in roles by Estonian playwrights and authors include those of: Uku Uusberg, Martin Algus, Vaino Vahing, Andrus Kivirähk, Oskar Luts, Madis Kõiv, and Eduard Vilde.

=== Television ===
Ivo Uukkivi made his television debut on the Eesti Televisioon (ETV) series Salmonid in 1993. From 1995 until 1996, he appeared on the EVTV (now, TV3) series V.E.R.I.. Other television appearances on Estonian television series in the 1990s include the TV3 series Waba Riik in 1997 and the TV3 series Kired from 1998 until 2000. Uukkivi has also appeared in several teleplays; in 1996 he appeared in the Talvo Pabut directed teleplay Trimalhio pidu, adapted from the 1935 Betti Alver penned poem Viletsuse komöödia; and in 1999, he appeared in the Ain Prosa directed teleplay Nukumaja ehk Norbert, an adaptation of Henrik Ibsen's 1897 play A Doll's House.

In 2003, Uukkivi made an appearance as Kaido on the popular TV3 drama series Kodu keset linna. In 2004, he played the role of Toomas in the Jussi Niilekselä directed television film Taksirengit. In 2007, he played a small role in the Andri Luup directed television film Kinnunen.

Ivo Uukkivi is possibly best recalled for his role of Post in the Kanal 2 crime-drama television series Kelgukoerad, a role he would play in approximately eighty-five episodes from 2006 until 2009. Another prominent television role for Uukkivi was the character Martin Kütt in the 2012 ETV thriller series Alpimaja; Uukkivi also acted as a producer on five episodes of the series.

Apart from Alpimaja, Uukkivi has also worked as a television producer on the Kanal 2 suspense-thriller series Süvahavva in 2012, and thirteen episodes of the 2012 TV3 comedy-drama series Nurjatud tüdrukud.

=== Film ===
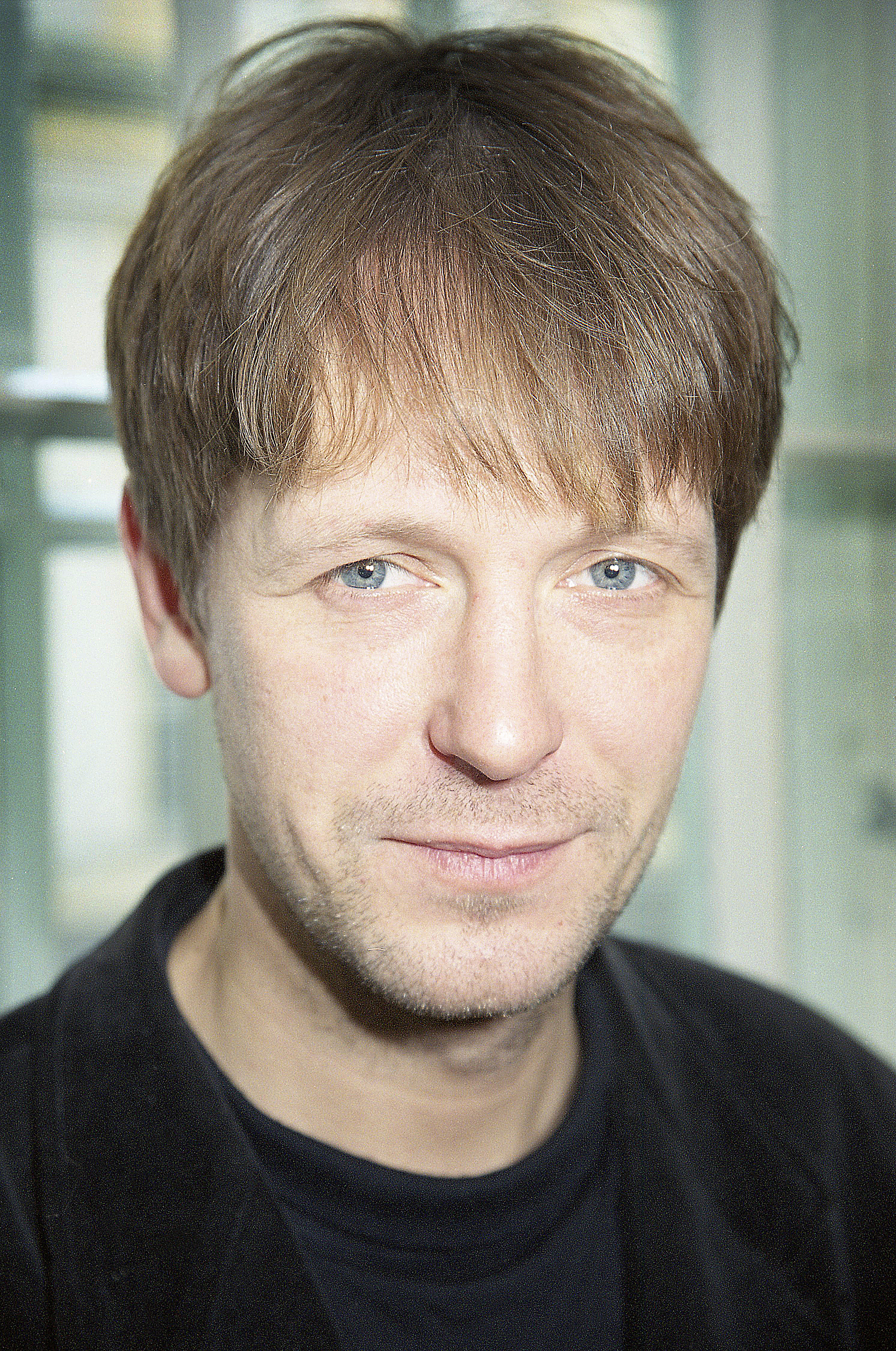
Uukkivi in 1999

Ivo Uukkivi has also appeared in a number of feature-length films. His first substantial role was as Moppe in the 1993 Pekka Karjalainen-directed comedy film Hysteria. This was followed by the starring role of Toivo in the Ilkka Järvi-Laturi-directed satirical political thriller Tallinn pimeduses the same year. The following year he appeared in the Jaan Kolberg-directed biographical drama film Jüri Rumm about the 19th-century Estonian folk hero, itinerant, thief and robber Rummu Jüri. In 1998, he played a small role in the Rao Heidmets-directed comedy-family film Kallis härra Q.

In 2003, he appeared in a small role in the Sulev Keedus-directed period drama Somnambuul. The following year, he played the role of Kuldar in the Ilmar Taska-directed thriller Täna öösel me ei maga for Taska Film. Täna öösel me ei maga (English release title: Set Point) is notable for Estonian model Carmen Kass appearing in a starring role. In 2007, he appeared in three films; as Laura's boyfriend in the Veiko Õunpuu-directed drama Sügisball; which was an adaptation of the 1979 Mati Unt novel of the same name; as Ants in the Rainer Sarnet-directed teen drama Kuhu põgenevad hinged; and a minor voice role for the Åke Lindman and Sakari Kirjavainen-directed Finnish World War II drama Tali-Ihantala 1944.

In 2012, Uukkivi appeared as a tough crook in the Andres Kõpper and Arun Tamm-directed dark comedy-crime film Vasaku jala reede. In 2015, he played role of Rudolf Kask in the Elmo Nüganen-directed World War II drama film 1944. The film is set in the year 1944 and is shown through the eyes of Estonian soldiers who had to choose sides and thus fight against their fellow countrymen. 1944 was selected as the Estonian entry for the Best Foreign Language Film at the 88th Academy Awards but it was not nominated.

In 2016, Uukkivi appeared in three films; a small role in the Anu Aun-directed drama Polaarpoiss; as Lembit in the Toomas Hussar-directed political thriller Luuraja ja Luuletaja; and a starring role as Andres in the Mart Kivastik-directed romantic drama Õnn tuleb magades opposite actress Katariina Unt. In 2020, he had a prominent role as Governor in the Rasmus Merivoo directed dark comedy-fantasy film Kratt. In 2023, he appeared as young Georg in the Mart Kivastik-directed comedy Taevatrepp, and the same year appeared as Erik in the Rain Rannu-directed comedy-drama Vaba rahu. In 2024, he appeared as Mia's Father in the science fiction thriller feature Infinite Summer.

In addition to feature films, Uukkivi has also appeared in a number of short films.

=== Radio ===
Uukkivi has also performed in a number of radio plays. Among his more memorable radio role performances were as Kaval-Ants in a 1992 radio theatre production of Juhan Kangilaski's Kaval-Ants ja Vanapagan, and Luis in a 2001 radio theatre production of Petri Salin's Rännukutse.

=== Music ===
In the early 1980s, Ivo Uukkivi (nicknamed Munk) was the vocalist of a short-lived Tallinn-based punk rock band called Kopli Otell. After the band folded in 1982, Uukkivi and Allan Vainola and Peep Männil, who were formerly members of the equally short-lived band Ajutine Valitsus, formed a new band called Velikije Luki. Vainola and Männil would leave the band shortly after its inception and new members Kuldar Hanstin (guitar), Raivo Pilt (bass guitar), Raik Kuusemets (drums) and guitarist Villu Tamme would round out the ensemble. Velikije Luki would release three albums: "Jõuluks koju" in 1989, "Velikiye Luki 15" in 1997, and "Tallinn põleb" in 2002. Tamme would go on to found the seminal Estonian punk rock band J.M.K.E. in 1986.

== Personal life ==
Ivo Uukkivi currently resides in Tallinn with his partner, actress Mari-Liis Lill. The couple have a son, born in 2011. He was previously in a relationship with actress Kristel Leesmend, with whom he has a daughter, Ulrike Brett, born in 1995.
