= Kaili Närep =

Estonian actress (born 1970)

- Born: 16 August 1970 (age 55); Pärnu, then part of Estonian SSR, Soviet Union
- Occupation: Actress
- Years active: 1989–present
- Children: 2

Kaili Närep (born 16 August 1970) is an Estonian stage, television and film actress whose career began in 1991. She has been engaged at the Ugala theatre in Viljandi and the Endla Theatre in Pärnu, where she also worked as a makeup artist. Närep has appeared in several motion pictures and has had recurring roles on several Estonian television series.

== Early life and education ==
Kaili Närep was born and raised in Pärnu. She studied violin at the Pärnu Children's Music School in the field of violin, graduating in 1985. She is a 1988 graduate of Pärnu 4th Secondary School. Afterward, she moved to Tallinn to study at the Tallinn Conservatory's Department of Performing Arts (now, the Estonian Academy of Music and Theatre) under the supervision of actor and instructor Kalju Komissarov, graduating in 1992. Among her graduating classmates were actors Jaanus Rohumaa, Üllar Saaremäe, Sten Zupping, Tiina Mälberg, Garmen Tabor, Ivo Uukkivi, Merle Palmiste, Kristel Leesmend, Andres Raag, and Dan Põldroos.

== Career ==
=== Theatre ===
Following her graduation from the Tallinn Conservatory, Närep began an engagement as an actress at the Ugala theatre in Viljandi where she appeared in roles in productions of works by Henrik Ibsen, Victor Hugo, Ernest Lehman, Walter Kollo, and Oskar Luts. Afterwards, she left for an engagement the Endla Theatre in her hometown of Pärnu, where she was employed as an actress from 2003 until 2009, when she was made redundant. During her time at the Endla, she also worked as one of the theatre's makeup artists. Following her dismissal from the Endla Theatre, Närep became a freelance actress.

=== Film ===
Kaili Närep's first film role was that of Evi in the 1989 Tallinnfilm drama Perekonnapildid while she was still a student at the Tallinn Conservatory. The film was directed by Valentin Kuik and based on the 1987 short story Valem, penned by Kuik. She has had small roles in the 2003 Rando Pettai directed and Peep Pedmanson penned comedy Vanad ja kobedad saavad jalad alla, the 2008 Asko Kase directed historical drama December Heat, and the 2015 Klaus Härö directed biopic Vehkleja, about Estonian fencer Endel Nelis.

=== Television ===
Närep has also appeared in several Estonian television series, most notably as the character Berit in the Kanal 2 drama series Pilvede all from 2012 until 2013, and as Vaike, one of the main characters on the TV3 comedy series Papad mammad from 2016 until 2018. In 2012, she had a prominent role as Reet Sool in the Andres Maimik and Rain Tolk directed and penned television comedy film Umbkotid, which also premiered as a feature film in Estonian theatres.

Närep has also made appearances in such other television series as the TV3 comedy series Doktor Silva, the Eesti Televisioon (ETV) crime series Ohtlik lend, the Kanal 2 crime series Kelgukoerad, and the TV3 comedy-crime series Kättemaksukontor.

== Personal life ==
Kaili Närep has two children and lives in Pärnu. She has worked as a care worker in a homeless shelter and trained to become a hairdresser – a profession she is still employed as at a salon in Pärnu – as well continuing to pursue her acting career.
