= Tiina Mälberg =

Estonian actress

Tiina Mälberg (born 16 March 1970) is an Estonian actress.

Tiina Mälberg was born and raised in Tallinn. She graduated from Saku Secondary School in 1988, then enrolled at the Tallinn State Conservatory, studying under instruction of theatre and film director Kalju Komissarov, and graduating in 1992. Among her graduating classmates were: Merle Palmiste, Kristel Leesmend, Andres Raag, Kaili Närep, Dan Põldroos, Jaanus Rohumaa, Üllar Saaremäe, Ivo Uukkivi, Sten Zupping, and Garmen Tabor.

In 2006, she received a master's degree in theatre from the Estonian Academy of Music and Theatre. From 2003 until 2004, she taught theatre courses at the Rakvere Private Gymnasium. Since 2011, Mälberg has been a theatre lecturer at the Viljandi Culture Academy of the University of Tartu.

From 1991 until 1997, she worked at Ugala theatre in Viljandi. Since 1997, she has been engaged at the Rakvere Theatre. Besides theatrical roles, she has also worked as a radio, television, and film actress.

== Selected filmography ==
- 2005 August 1991 (role: Virve Liivanõmm)
- 2006 Kelgukoerad
- 2011 Kalevipojad
- 2012 Kättemaksukontor (role: Inge Peeker)
- 2014-2016 Viimane võmm (role: Laura Kotkas)
- 2016 Ema ('Mother') (role: Mother)
- 2017 Mehetapja/Süütu/Vari (role: Guardian)
- 2021 Mädät omenat ('Bad apples') (role: Amalia)
- 2021 Vanaema, saa tuttavaks! (role: Virve)
- 2023 Mrs. Chatterjee vs. Norway (role: Saara Piius)
