= Andres Raag =

Estonian theater, film, television, and radio actor and singer (born 1970)

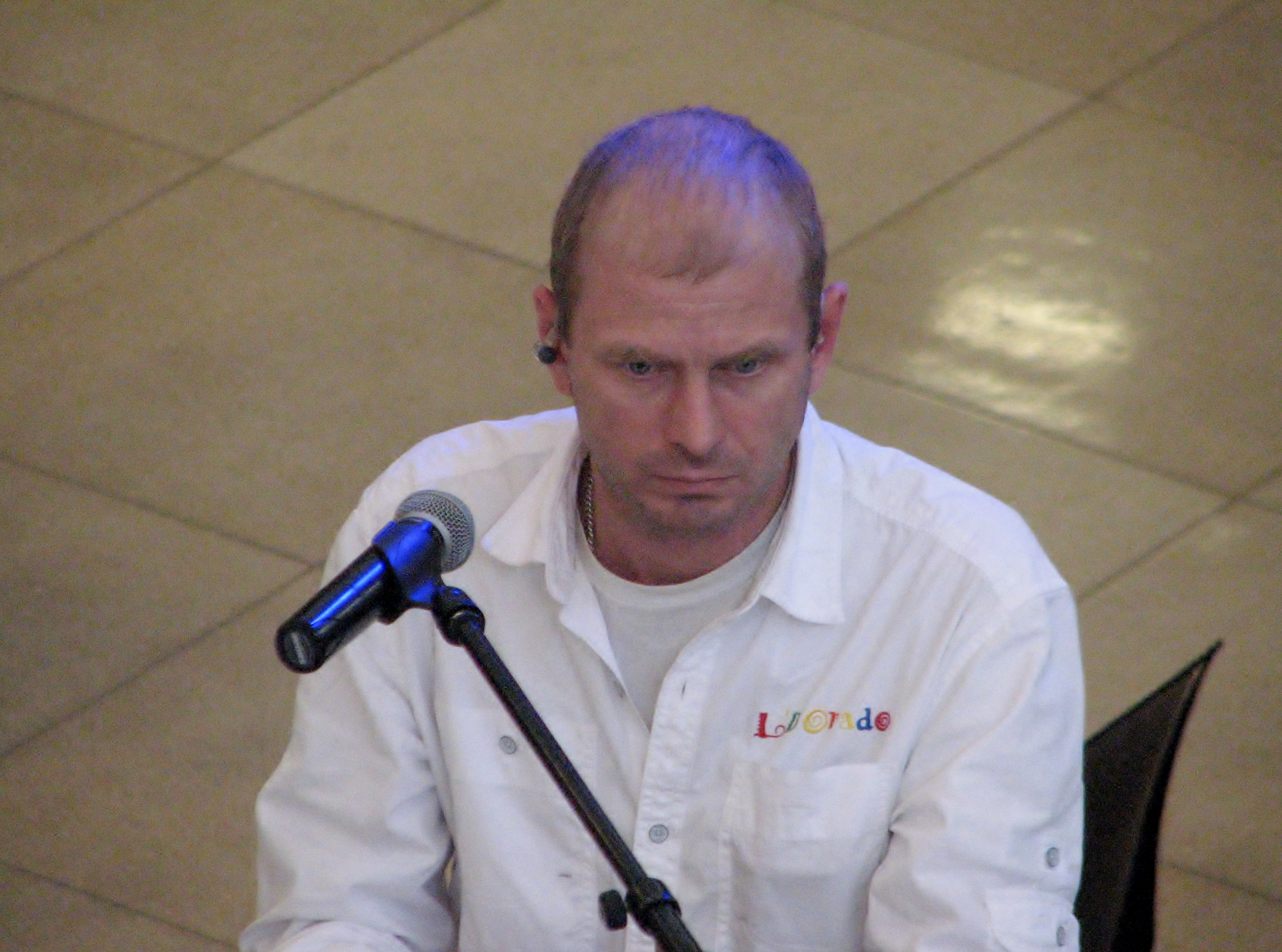
- Raag in 2013
- Born: 24 June 1970 (age 56); Tallinn, then part of Estonian SSR, Soviet Union
- Occupations: Actor, singer
- Years active: 1990–present
- Children: 1
- Parents: Kersti Kreismann (mother); Mati Unt (stepfather)

Andres Raag (born 24 June 1970) is an Estonian stage, film, radio and television actor and singer with the band L'Dorado since 1993.

== Early life and education ==
Andres Raag was born and attended schools in Tallinn. His mother is actress Kersti Kreismann and his step-father was writer, essayist and theatre director Mati Unt. During his formative years, he spent much of his time with his paternal grandparents. Following his graduation from secondary school he attended the Tallinn State Conservatory (now, the Estonian Academy of Music and Theatre), studying drama at the institution's Performing Arts Department. Among his graduating classmates were Merle Palmiste, Kaili Närep, Kristel Leesmend, Ivo Uukkivi, Jaanus Rohumaa, Üllar Saaremäe, Dan Põldroos, Sten Zupping, Tiina Mälberg and Garmen Tabor.

== Stage career ==
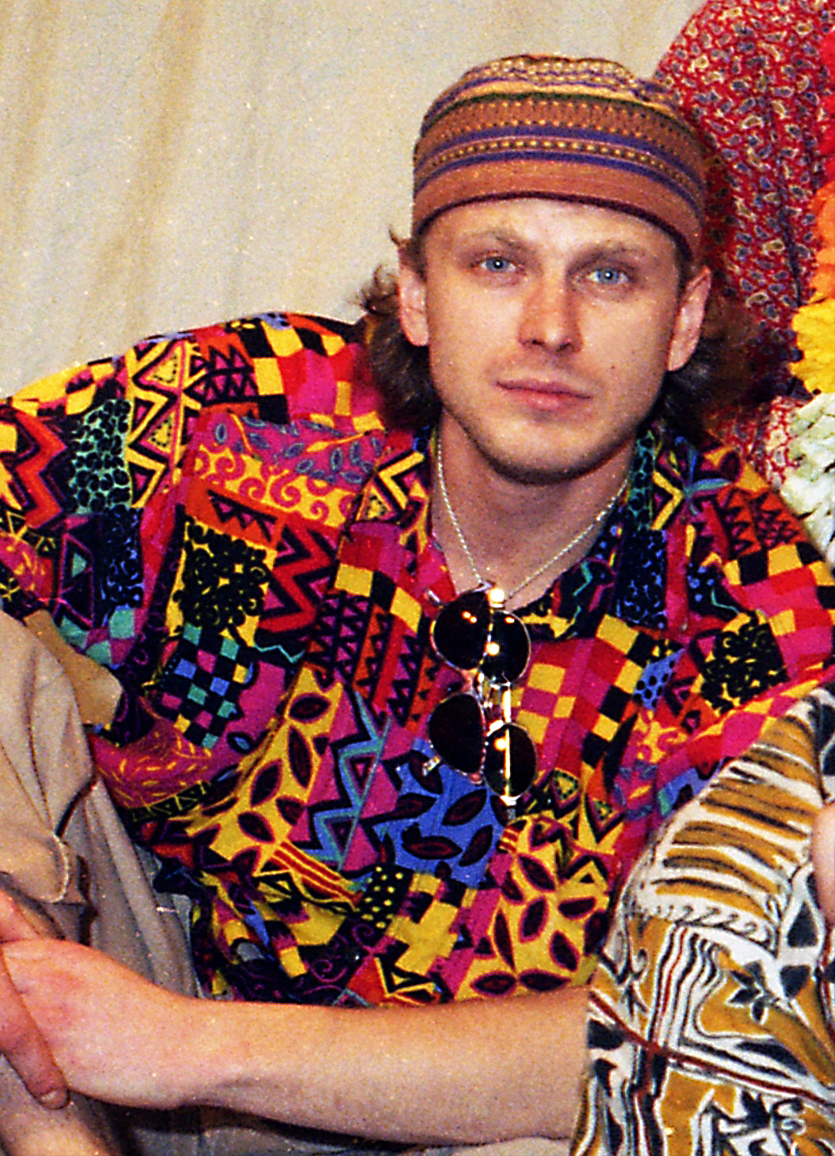
Raag in 1998

In 1990, Andres Raag began an engagement at the Estonian State Youth Theatre, which became the Tallinn City Theatre in 1992. He is still currently an actor with the theatre. During his years with the Tallinn City Theatre, he has appeared in roles in nearly fifty stage productions, including works by: Shakespeare, Molière, Chekhov, Brecht and Weill, Beckett, Twain, Dumas, Gogol, von Goethe, Thomas Mann, Evelyn Waugh, A. H. Tammsaare, Tom Stoppard, Martin McDonagh, David Storey, and Jean-Luc Lagarce, among many others.

Raag is a 2002 Ants Lauter Award recipient for recognition of his performances as a stage actor. He has also received the Tallinn City Theatre Colleague Award in 2001 for Best Actor, Best Supporting Actor in 2002, 2007 and 2013, and Best Actor in 2009 for the role of Kemp in Morris Panych's Auntie & Me.

In addition to the Tallinn City Theatre, Raag has also made appearances at the Von Krahl Theatre, Old Baskin's Theatre, Kell Kümme, and Estonian Drama Theatre in Tallinn, the Ugala theatre in Viljandi, and the Kuressaare City Theatre.

== Film ==
Andres Raag made his feature film debut as Ain in the 1989 Valentin Kuik directed Soviet-Estonian youth drama Perekonnapildid for Tallinnfilm. In 1993, he had a small role as a waiter in the joint Finnish-Estonian Anssi Mänttäri directed drama film The Grey Light of November, and another role as Contreras in the Ilkka Järvi-Laturi directed comedy-thriller Tallinn pimeduses.

Other film appearances include roles in the 2010 Marko Raat directed Lumekuninganna, based on the 1844 Hans Christian Andersen fairy tale The Snow Queen; and the 2011 Katrin Laur directed drama Surnuaiavahi tütar.

== Television and radio ==
Andres Raag has made a number of appearances on Estonian television. He is possibly best recalled, however, as the character of Tom Miller on the long running TV3 drama series Elu keset linna from 2003 until 2006 and again from 2009. He would reprise his role as Tom in the TV3 follow-up series Elu keset linna in 2012. In 2014, he began playing the role of Gunnar, a driving instructor, on the Kanal 2 comedy series Parim enne.

Other appearances on television include guest roles as Avo on an episode of Kanal 2's crime-drama series Kelgukoerad in 2007; as Enn Loots on an episode of the Eesti Televisioon (ETV) crime-drama series Ohtlik lend in 2007; as Roger on an episode of the TV3 comedy-crime series Kättemaksukontor in 2009; and as Sten Vaiksoo in two episodes of the TV3 mystery-horror series Keeris in 2015. Raag has also had roles in several Estonian television mini-series, including: Oli mis oli in 2004; Klass - Elu pärast in 2010, which was a follow-up to the 2007 Ilmar Raag directed feature film Klass about bullying and school violence; and in Teise mehe pea in 2010.

Raag has also appeared in a number of Estonian Public Broadcasting television and radio programs for children and a number of radio theatre plays.

== Music ==
In late 1993, Andres Raag and friends Tarvo Krall, Tarvo Jaaksoo, and Jaan Sööt formed the band L'Dorado. Their first performance took place at the House of the Blackheads in Tallinn in 1994. Over the years, the line-up has changed several times, however Raag has remained the main vocalist. L'Dorado plays a mixture of Latin music and merengue music, sung in the Estonian language. The current line-up includes: Raag (lead vocals and conga drums), Krall (vocals, mandolin, and accordion), Jaaksoo (vocals and bass guitar), Toomas Rull (drums), and Anneli Kadakas (drums). To date, the band has released four albums: "Kuuba pulm" (1996), "Karneval" (1998), "Siivutu Sa mulle meeldid nii" (2000), and "Kahe samba vahel" (2003). They have also appeared on several compilation albums.

== Personal life ==
Andres Raag has been in a long-term relationship with Viktorija Gurjev for many years. In 2003, Gurjev gave birth to their daughter Aliis. The family currently reside in Tallinn.
