= Merle Palmiste =

Estonian actress (born 1970)

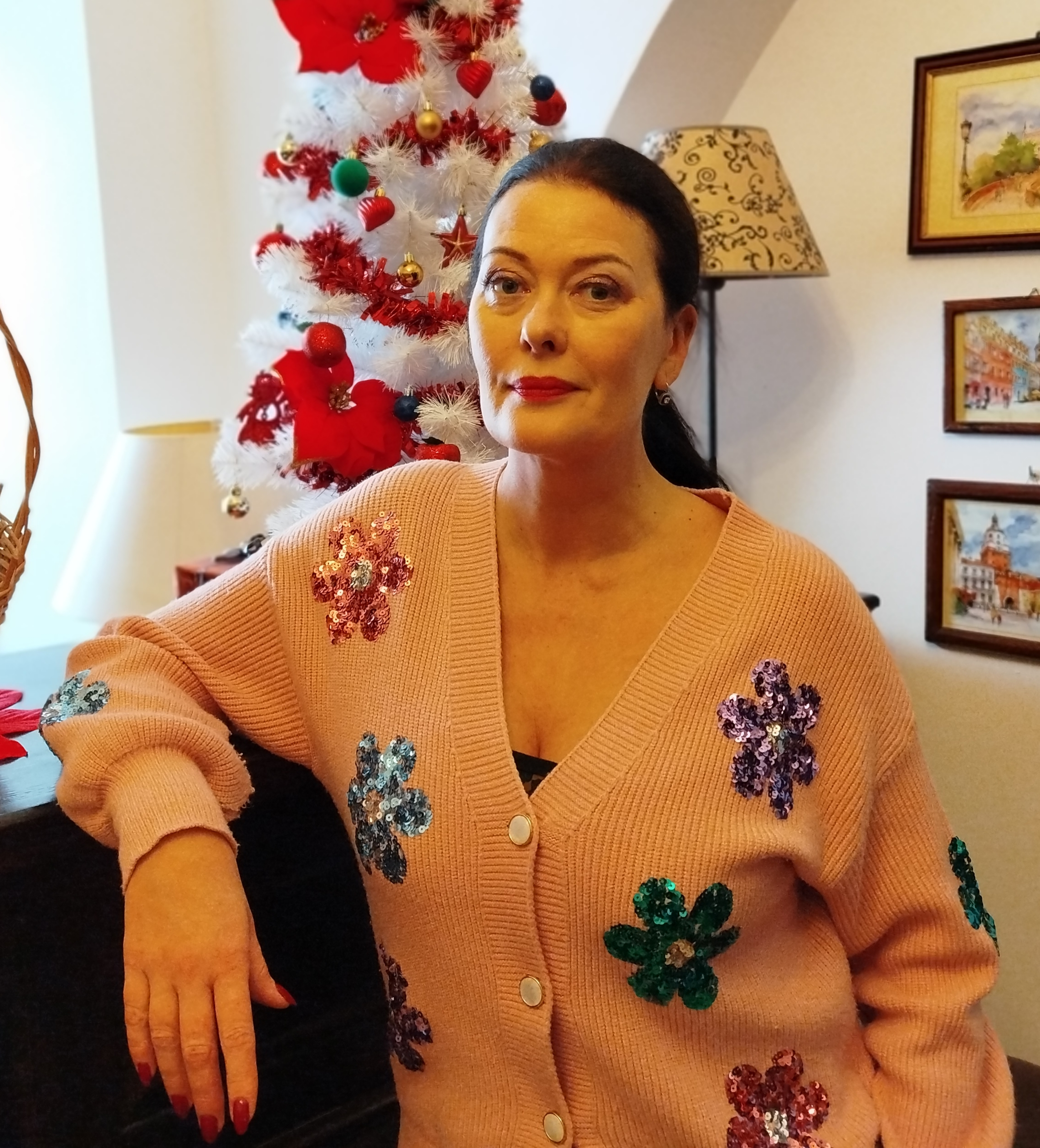
- Palmiste in 2026
- Born: 1 November 1970 (age 55); Tallinn, then part of Estonian SSR, Soviet Union
- Occupation: Actress
- Years active: 1991–present
- Children: 1

Merle Palmiste (born 1 November 1970) is an Estonian stage, film and television actress.

== Early life and education ==
Merle Palmiste was born in Tallinn and raised in the Tallinn subdistrict of Õismäe. Her father was an engineer and her mother was an accountant. She attended primary and secondary schools in Tallinn, graduating from Tallinn's 9th Secondary School in 1988. Following graduation, she enrolled in the Tallinn Conservatory (now, the Estonian Academy of Music and Theatre), graduating in 1992. Palmiste's diploma production roles included Helena in William Shakespeare's A Midsummer Night's Dream and Nina Mikhailovna Zarechnaya in Anton Chekhov's The Seagull. Among her graduating classmates were Andres Raag, Kristel Leesmend, Ivo Uukkivi, Jaanus Rohumaa, Üllar Saaremäe, Kaili Närep, Dan Põldroos, Sten Zupping, Tiina Mälberg and Garmen Tabor.

== Career ==
=== Stage ===
Following her graduation from the Tallinn Conservatory in 1992, Palmiste began a professional engagement as an actress at the Estonian Drama Theatre in Tallinn, where she remains. Throughout her career at the Estonian Drama Theatre, she has performed in roles of works by such international authors and playwrights as: Luigi Pirandello, Yukio Mishima, Michael Frayn, Tankred Dorst, Noël Coward, Arthur Miller, Hermann Bahr, Charles Dickens, Per Olov Enquist, Ayn Rand, Molière, Alan Ayckbourn, Terry Pratchett, Neil Simon, Hristo Boytchev, Evgeny Schwartz, John Patrick, Fyodor Dostoyevsky, Paul Lucas, Henrik Ibsen, Conor McPherson, Juan Rulfo, Ernest Hemingway, John Hodge, Tom Stoppard and Jordi Galceran. Roles in productions of works by Estonian authors and playwrights include: Andrus Kivirähk, Merle Karusoo, Madis Kõiv, Eduard Vilde, Jaan Kross, Eva Koff, Toomas Kall, Hendrik Toompere, and Vaino Vahing, among others.

Additionally, Palmiste has performed onstage at several other theatres in Estonia, chiefly, the Ugala theatre in Viljandi and the Tartu Theatre Lab in Tartu.

=== Film ===
Merle Palmiste made her full-length feature film debut in the role of Evelin in the 1994 Jaan Kolberg-directed historical action-drama Jüri Rumm; based on the life of the 19th-century Estonian brigand and folk hero Rummu Jüri. This was followed by the role of Grey One in the 2001 Arvo Iho-directed romantic drama Karu süda. In 2006, she appeared as Rutt in the Jüri Sillart-directed and Hans Luik penned melodrama Kuldrannake for Taska Film.

In 2001, Palmiste had a small role as an adjutant in the Sulev Keedus-directed drama Kirjad Inglile, starring Tõnu Oja and Rain Simmul. That same year, she voiced the character Benita the Cow in the Heiki Ernits and Janno Põldma-directed animated children's film Lotte and the Moonstone Secret (Estonian: Lotte ja kuukivi saladus), which was the second full-length feature film of the popular Estonian Lotte franchise. In 2013, she appeared in the role of Karin Viisla in the René Vilbre-directed family-fantasy film Väikelinna detektiivid ja valge daami saladus, produced by Balti Video and Eesti Rahvusringhääling. In 2016, she appeared in a small role as Mari in the Triin Ruumet-directed tragicomedy Päevad, mis ajasid segadusse, about a young, disaffected man played by Hendrik Toompere Jr. Jr. on a frantic journey through midsummer Estonia in the late 1990s trying to discover purpose and meaning in his life. In 2019, she appeared in the role of Marianne Büttel in the Mart Sander directed fantasy-horror film Kõhedad muinaslood.

In 2020, she voiced several characters in the Meelis Arulepp and Karsten Kiilerich directed animated feature film Sipsik, based on the popular 1962 children's book of the same title by Eno Raud.

In addition to Estonian films, Palmiste has appeared in several foreign language films, including; the 2003 Russian language feature-length romantic drama Yantarnye krylya directed by Andrey Razenkov; the 2004 German language film short Willkommen in Tallinn directed by Oliver Frohnauer; and the 2008 Ukrainian language family feature-length film Prykolna Kazka directed by Roman Shirman. Beginning in the early 2000s, Palmiste has also appeared in a number of Estonian short films.

=== Television ===
Merle Palmiste's career in television began in 1993 on the Toomas Kirss-directed Eesti Televisioon (ETV) drama series Salmonid. In the mid-1995 she appeared in small role in the Dietmar Bär directed German television drama film Nadja - Heimkehr in die Fremde. Her next several roles were all in foreign television productions: as Irina in the 1996 Finnish television crime-drama miniseries Sergein totuus, as Gertrude Sellers in the 1997 Finnish television drama-thriller film Nurkkapöytä Kämpissä, and a small role in the 1999 Swedish television comedy-drama film Torsk på Tallinn - en liten film om ensamhet in 1999.

Other substantial television film roles include the 2001 TV3 spy-comedy Kodumaa parim poeg ehk eriagent 1188, and the character of Ingrid in the 2005 Rainer Sarnet-directed ETV feature-length comedy-drama Libahundi needus.

Notable roles in television series include Riina in the 1998–1999 TV3 television serial drama Kired, Vilve in the 2005–2006 TV3 comedy series Hajameelselt abielus, Kertu in seven episodes of the Kanal 2 crime series Kelgukoerad between 2006 and 2007, as Riina on the TV3 drama television series Kälimehed from 2011 until 2012, and several appearances on the popular TV3 comedy-crime series Kättemaksukontor between 2013 and 2015.

In 2016, Palmiste appeared on the Kanal 2 reality series Suur Komöödiaõhtu, in which several Estonian celebrities compete in a variety of weekly comedic challenges. In 2017, she appeared as Anna in the TV3 mystery-drama series Merivälja. The same year she was cast to appear in a starring role as Madame Kukk in the 2018 TV3 period drama Litsid, based on the 2015 novel of the same name by Mart Sander. In May 2018, Palmiste was awarded the Best Actress in a TV Series for her role on Litsid at the 2018 Estonian Entertainment Awards.

== Personal life ==
Merle Palmiste was formerly involved in a long-term relationship with Alex Lepajõe. Their daughter is the fashion model Elisabeth Berthel who was born in 1996. Palmiste currently resides in Tallinn.
