= Rakvere Theatre =

Theatre in Estonia

Coordinates: 59°21′1.09″N 26°21′1.08″E

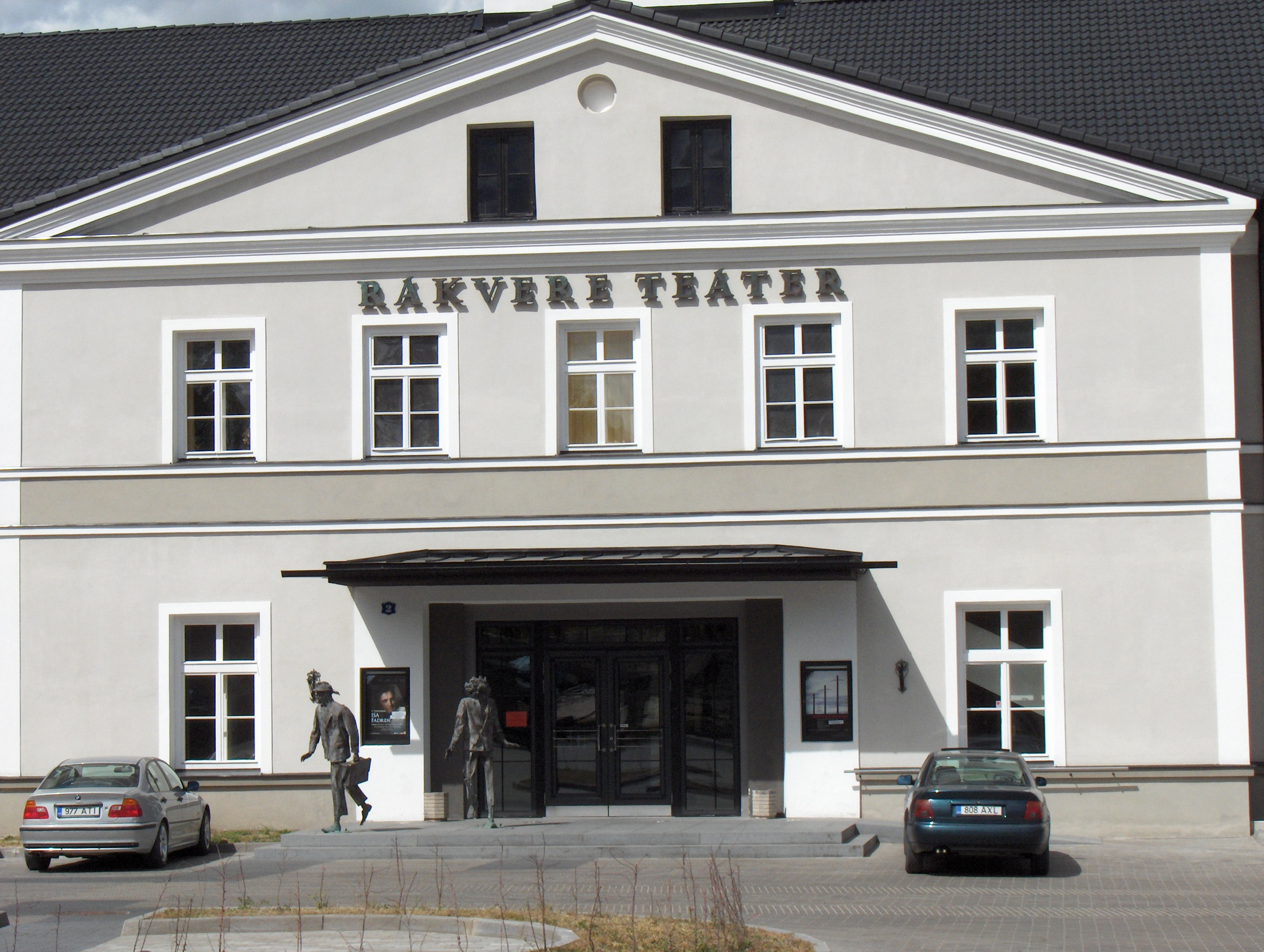
The building of Rakvere Theatre

Rakvere Theatre is a professional theatre in Rakvere, Estonia.

== History ==
Rakvere Theatre was established in the fall of 1921, when Rakvere Näitlejate Ring was formed. The building of the Rakvere Theatre was opened with a public ceremony on 24 February 1940, the 22nd anniversary of independent Estonia, the following day the first ever play, August Kitzberg's "Tuulte pöörises" premiered. The theatre's artistic director is Üllar Saaremäe, and theatre manager is Joonas Tartu.

Rakvere is believed to be the smallest town in Europe, which has its own professional theatre.

As of 2019, the troupe consists of 21 actors, eleven men and ten women:

- Anneli Rahkema
- Eduard Salmistu
- Elar Vahter
- Grete Jürgenson
- Helgi Annast
- Imre Õunapuu
- Jaune Kimmel
- Liisa Aibel
- Maarika Mesipuu-Veebel
- Madis Mäeorg
- Margus Grosnõi
- Märten Matsu
- Natali Väli
- Peeter Rästas
- Saara Pius
- Silja Miks
- Tarmo Tagamets
- Tarvo Sõmer
- Tiina Mälberg
- Toomas Suuman
- Ülle Lichtfeldt

== Gallery ==
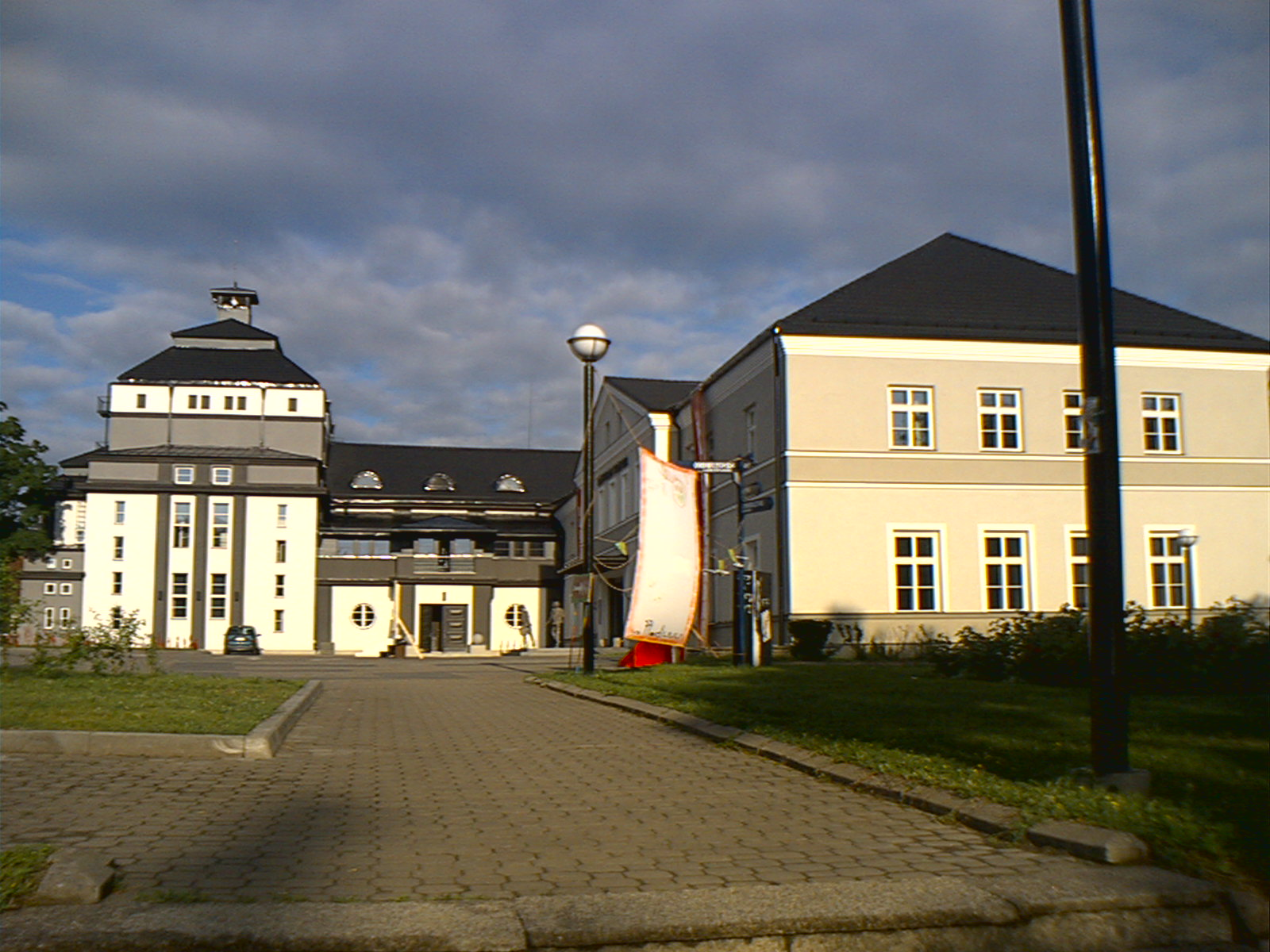
Theatre building from east

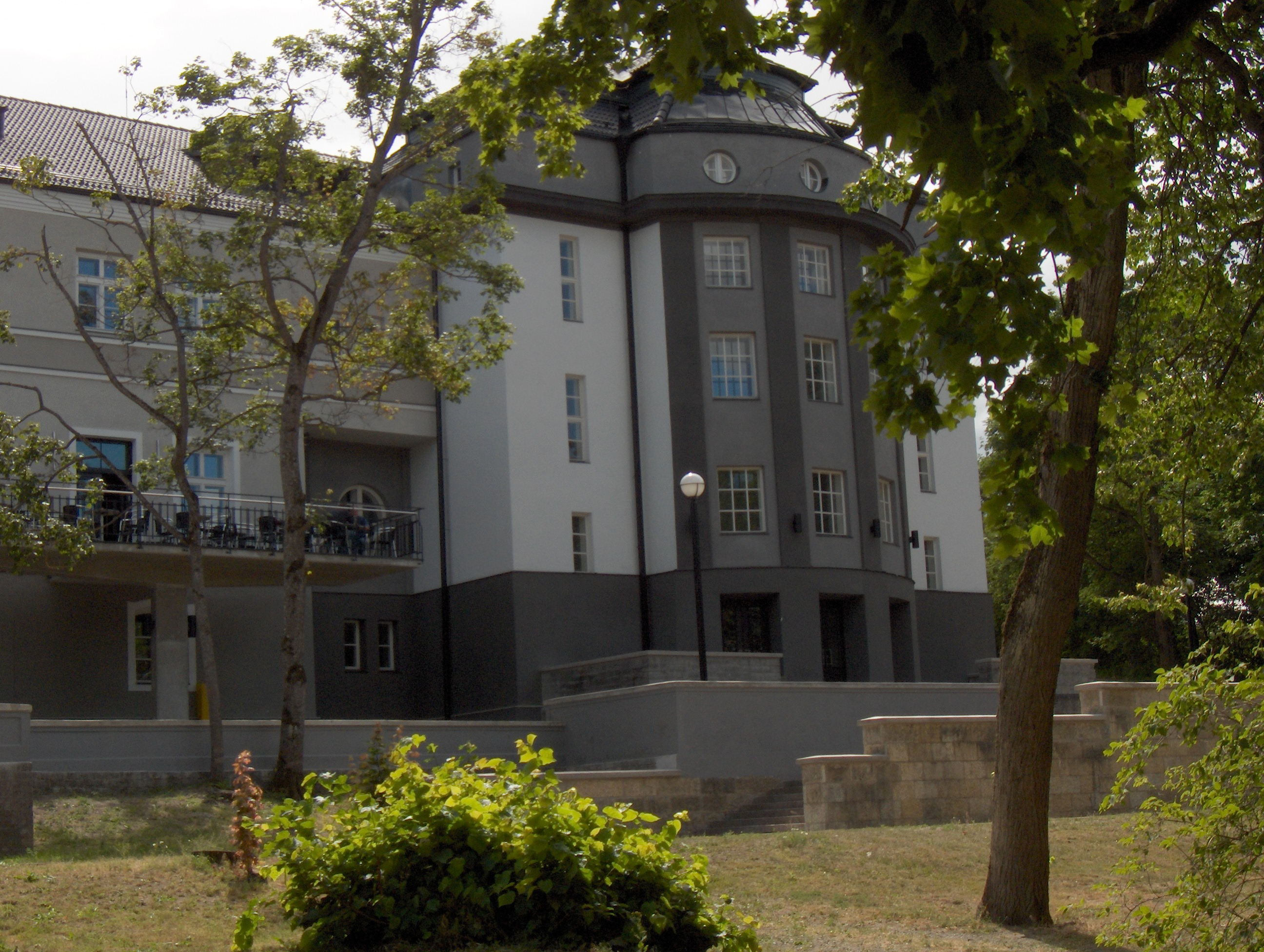
View from the Park of the Theatre

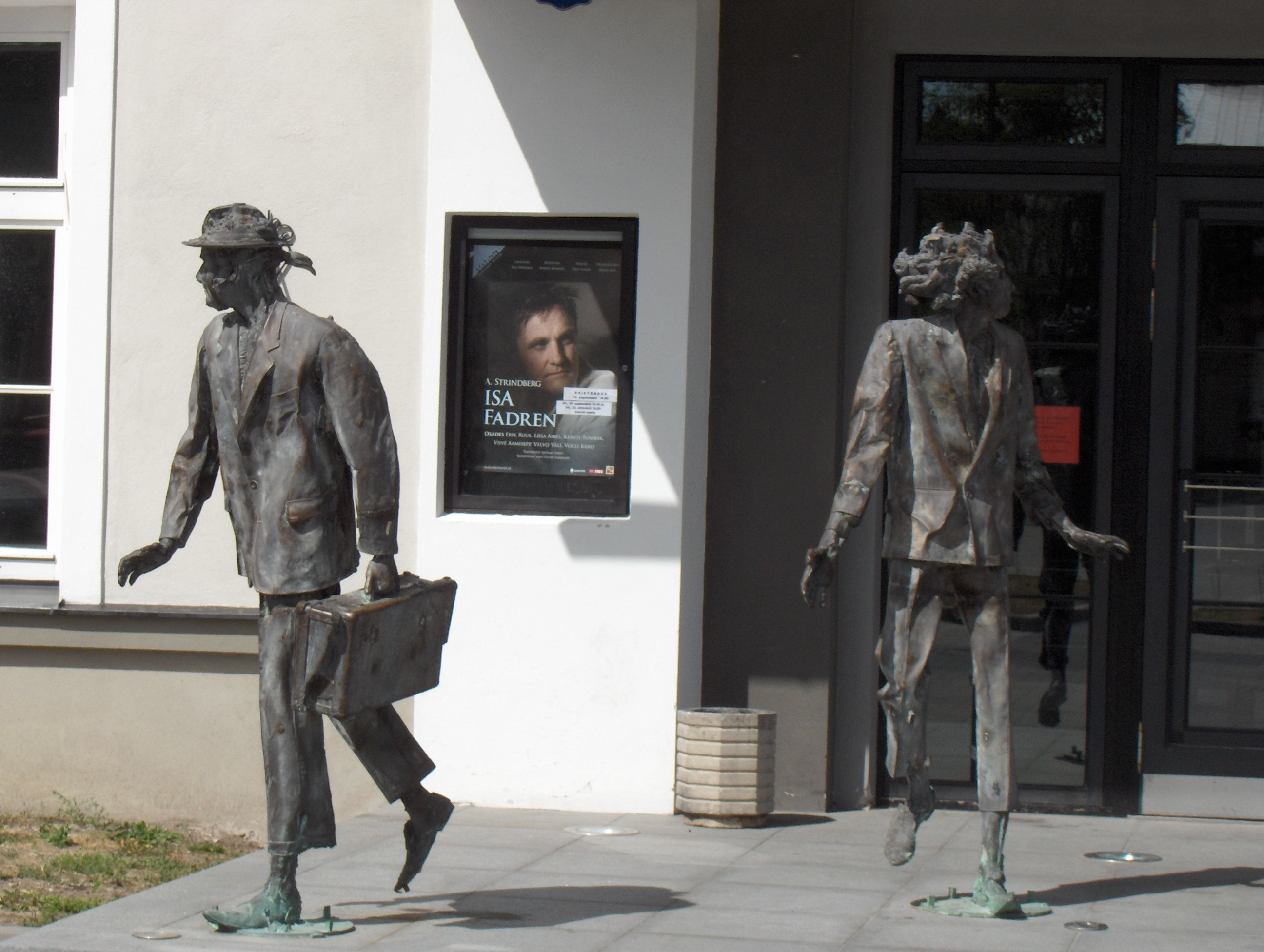
Statues in front of the Rakvere Theatre

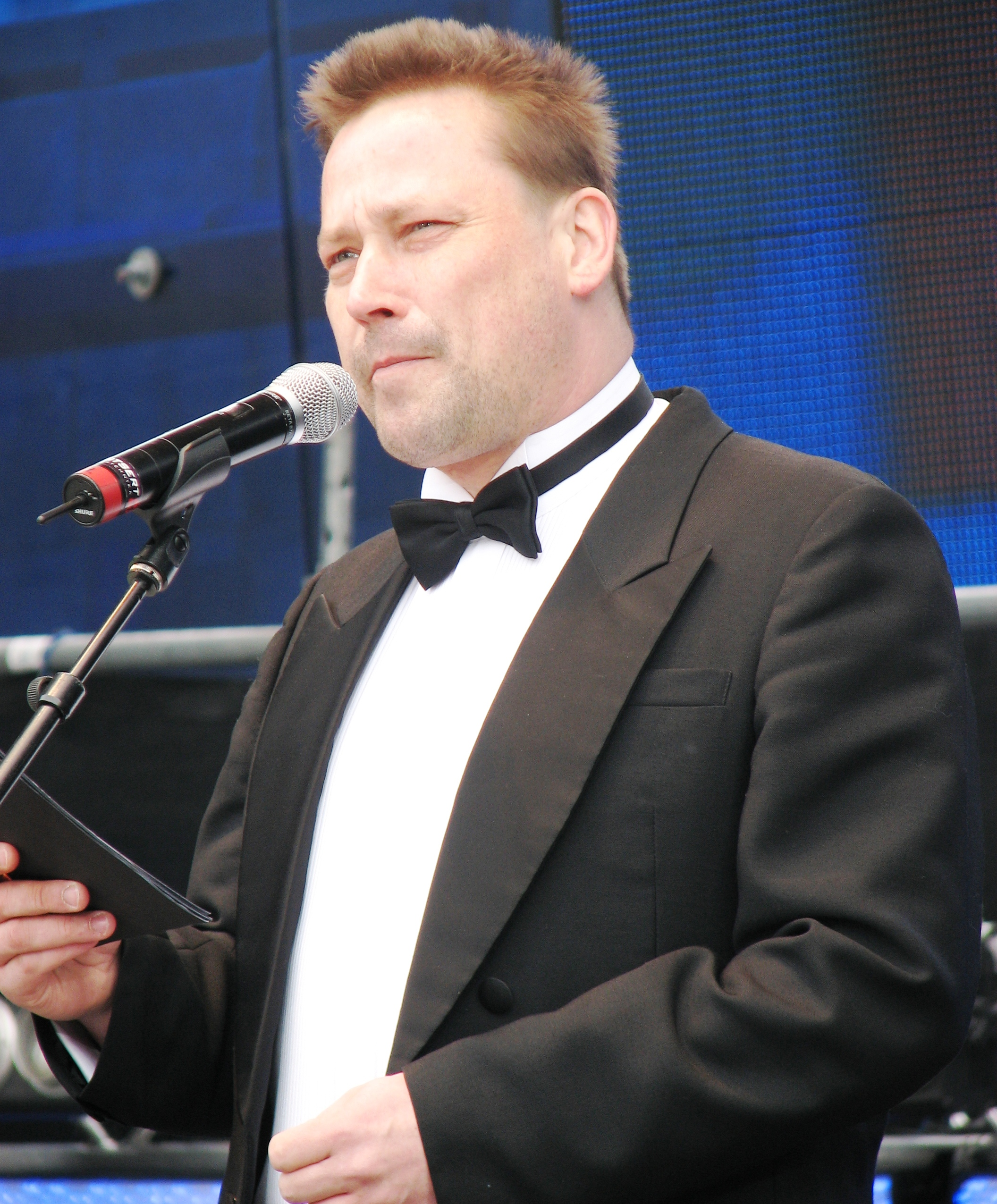
Artistic director Üllar Saaremäe
