= Darkness in Tallinn =

1993 film directed by Ilkka Järvi-Laturi

- Directed by: Ilkka Järvi-Laturi
- Written by: Paul Kolsby
- Produced by: Ilkka Järvi-Laturi
- Cinematography: Rein Kotov
- Edited by: Christopher Tellefsen
- Music by: Mader
- Distributed by: FilmZolfo; Upstream Pictures
- Release date: 12 September 1993
- Running time: 99 minutes
- Countries: Estonia; Finland
- Languages: Estonian; Finnish

Darkness in Tallinn (a.k.a. City Unplugged; Estonian: Tallinn pimeduses) is a 1993 feature film, a satirical political thriller directed by Ilkka Järvi-Laturi and written by Paul Kolsby. The film premiered on September 12, 1993, at the Toronto Festival of Festivals, and later played at the Sundance Film Festival in January 1994. Written by an American and directed by a Finn (the two met at New York University), the film was one of the more unusual and most popular of 1993. It was reshown at the Rotterdam Filmfestival 2013 for professional audience.

== Cast ==
- Ivo Uukkivi as Toivo
- Elina Aasa as Violinist
- Milena Gulbe as Maria
- Jüri Järvet as Anton
- Kristel Kärner as Extra
- Kadri Kilvet as Nurse
- Salme Poopuu as Nurse
- Andres Raag as Contreras
- Enn Klooren as Mikhail
- Ulvi Kreitsmann as Nurse
- Väino Laes as Andres
- Kristel Leesmend as Saleswoman
- Anna-Liisa Lehtimetsä as Extra
- Leida Paju as Cleaning woman
- Külli Palmsaar as Extra
- Kerstin Raidma as Gang girl
- Salme Reek as Shoplady
- Garmen Tabor as Diana
