= Wremja =

Estonian television series

Wremja was an Estonian situational comedy showing the lives of lower class people. It featured campy humor, intentionally, so as to keep the budget low. Wremja was preceded by the Wigla Show featuring a similar style, and the name was later changed to "Sipelga 14", as a reference to the Estonian soap opera "Õnne 13".

== Characters ==
Uuno Nisu (Nisu-Unn) (Dan Põldroos) is an alcoholic World War II veteran who fought for Germany and burned Hitler's corpse while drunk in 1945. He wears a red coat and has a moustache. He will drink anything with alcohol in it, including cologne and perfume.

Zorro (Jaan Zorro) (Jan Uuspõld) is Uuno's roommate (after kicking out Uno's family). He is a devoted communist who worked as a torturer, spy and astronaut for the Soviet government. He wears a beret and two pairs of glasses.

Haista Gäng (Dan Põldroos) is a severely alcoholic 30-year old son of Uno. He wears a worn-out wifebeater and boxers, is a chain-smoker and drinks strong beer. He was also briefly adopted by Zorro against his own wishes.

Laar (Mart Laar) (Meelis Adamson) is a women's hairdresser and the Prime Minister of Estonia. Although he’s a fascist, Zorro and Uno still consider him to be a dear friend. He is very timid to the point of being a sissy and rarely able to stand up for himself. He was constantly henpecked, abused and degraded by his wife and mother-in-law until him refusing to put up with it anymore and escaping to France with Zorro’s aid.

Ämm / The Mother-in-Law (Maali) (Dan Põldroos) is a sadistic old lady who, after coming to live with her daughter, Maie, harasses Laars. After Mart leaves the household, she keeps tormenting Maie daily. She almost always wants sex, and she constantly eats soup from a bowl.

Rullnokad Pets ja Aiku (Peeter Kelk and Aivar Sõnajalg) (Jan Uuspõld and Dan Põldroos) are local youngsters working in the car scrapyard. They're fairly unintelligent, even though either one may have occasional moments of wisdom and clarity. They love visiting nightclubs, drinking heavily and racing around in whatever cars they could afford. Aiku was also castrated by Uno’s tapeworm whom Zorro accidentally flushed, causing the former to attack everyone who happened to go to the toilet.

Dr. Liiv (Anti Liiv) (Martin Padar) is a prominent psychiatrist and the village elder of Haabersti. Though professionally talented, he is extremely corrupt and likes going to bordellos and drinking moonshine with Zorro, Uno and Laar.

Koomik Eints / Eints the Comedian (Eino Baskin) (Dan Põldroos) is an old school comedian who quotes Arkadi Raikin and wears winter clothing even during summer. He talks with a horrible rasp in his voice.

Viki (Viktro King) (Jan Uuspõld) is a television figure and a former classmate of Uuno Nisu. He is almost always drunk.

Feeliks Raudjalg (Dan Põldroos) is a molester who fakes that he is crippled. He pretends to be a proud Estonian freedom fighter, when he was really a spy for the KGB.

Mürka ja Mürka perse / Mürka and Ass of Mürka (Jan Uuspõld and Dan Põldroos) is the ass of renowned Estonian basketball star Martin Müürsepp. It tends to have a life of its own and sometimes escapes from its owner.

Inspektor Kukeke (Valdek Kukeke) (Dan Põldroos) is a corrupt, incompetent police. He gets his information on crimes from TV, because "newspapers are too expensive".
