= Andero Ermel =

Estonian actor

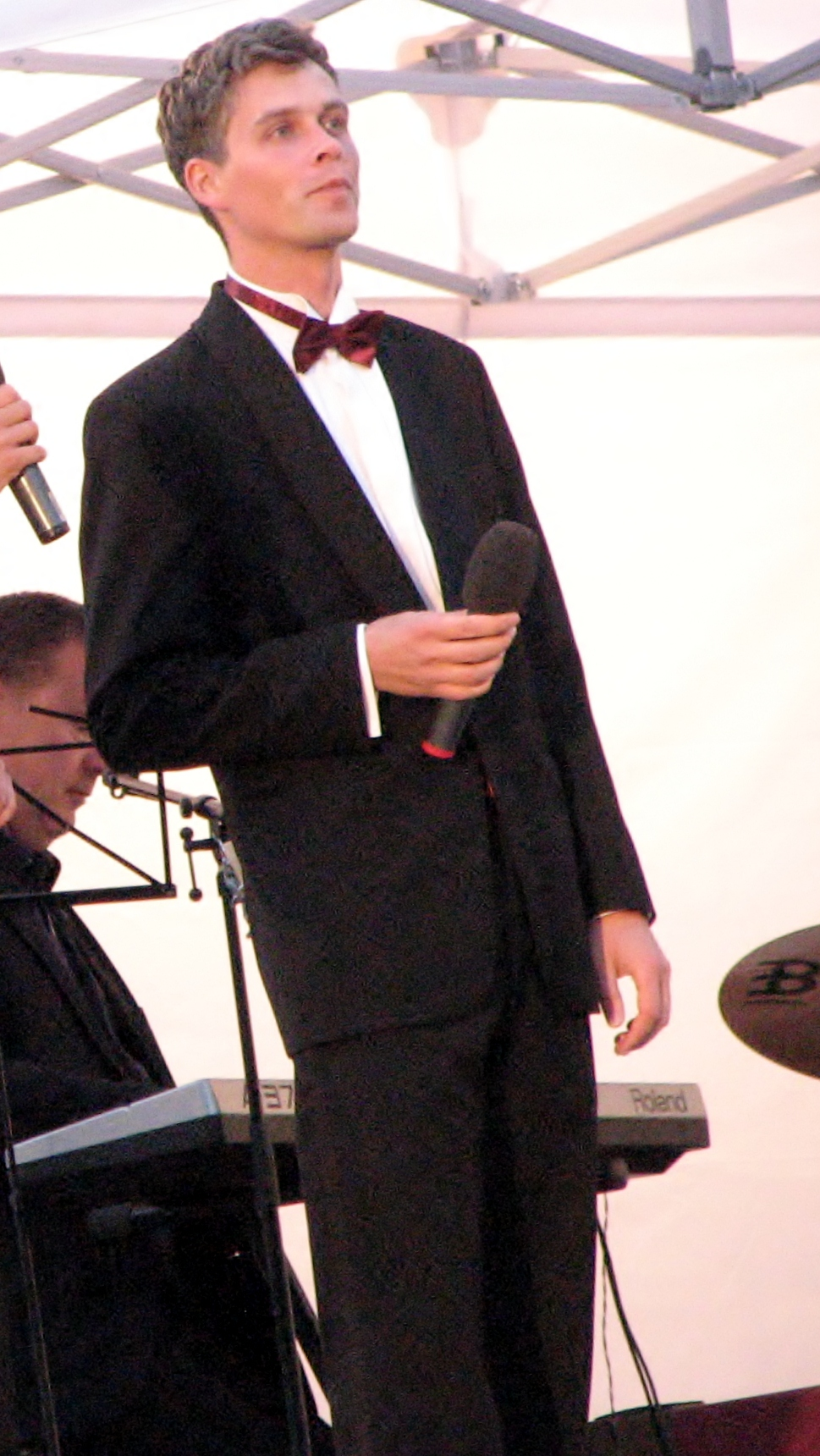
- Born: 6 August 1976 (age 49); Tartu, then part of Estonian SSR, Soviet Union
- Occupation: Actor
- Years active: 1996 – present
- Children: 2

Andero Ermel (born 6 August 1976) is an Estonian stage, film, television, and voice actor.

== Early life and education ==
Andero Ermel was born in Tartu. His father was Meelis Ermel and his mother's maiden name was Uibopuu. He has two siblings. He attended Rõngu Secondary School, graduating in 1994, before enrolling and being accepted into the EMA Higher Drama School (now, the Estonian Academy of Music and Theatre), where he graduated from in 1998. Among his graduating classmates were Tiit Sukk, Hilje Murel, Veikko Täär, Harriet Toompere, Liina Vahtrik, and Jan Uuspõld.

== Stage career ==
In 1998, Ermel was offered a position as an actor at the Tallinn City Theatre where he is still currently engaged. He made his stage debut at the theatre as Jimmy in a 1998 production of Brecht and Weill's The Threepenny Opera. During his engagement at the Tallinn City Theatre Ermel has appeared in over thirty roles in productions of works by such varied international authors and playwrights as: Shakespeare, Ibsen, Dostoyevsky, Yeats, Evelyn Waugh, Anton Chekhov, Thomas Mann, and Mark Twain, among others. Roles in productions of works by Estonian authors and playwrights include those of: Paavo Piik, Jaan Tätte, A. H. Tammsaare, Arthur Valdes, and Eduard Vilde, among several others.

Ermel has appeared onstage as an actor at several other theatres in Estonia, including the Emajõe Summer Theatre in Tartu, and the Vanalinnastuudio, the Estonian National Opera, and the Estonian National Puppet Theatre (NUKU) in Tallinn.

== Film and television ==
Ermel's feature film debut was as the voice of Tim in the Heiki Ernits and Janno Põldma directed animated children's film Lepatriinude jõulud for Eesti Joonisfilm in 2001. This was followed in 2006 by the voice role of Bruno in the Ernits and Põldma directed animated children's film Leiutajateküla Lotte, also for Eesti Joonisfilm. Leiutajateküla Lotte and sequel films and their characters proved so popular in Estonia that a theme park, Lottemaa, was subsequently opened in Reiu, Pärnu County, Estonia. The following year, when director Peeter Simm cast Latvian singer and actor Renārs Kaupers as Caesar in his biographical drama Georg, which chronicles the life of Estonian singer Georg Ots, Ermel provided the vocal dubbing.

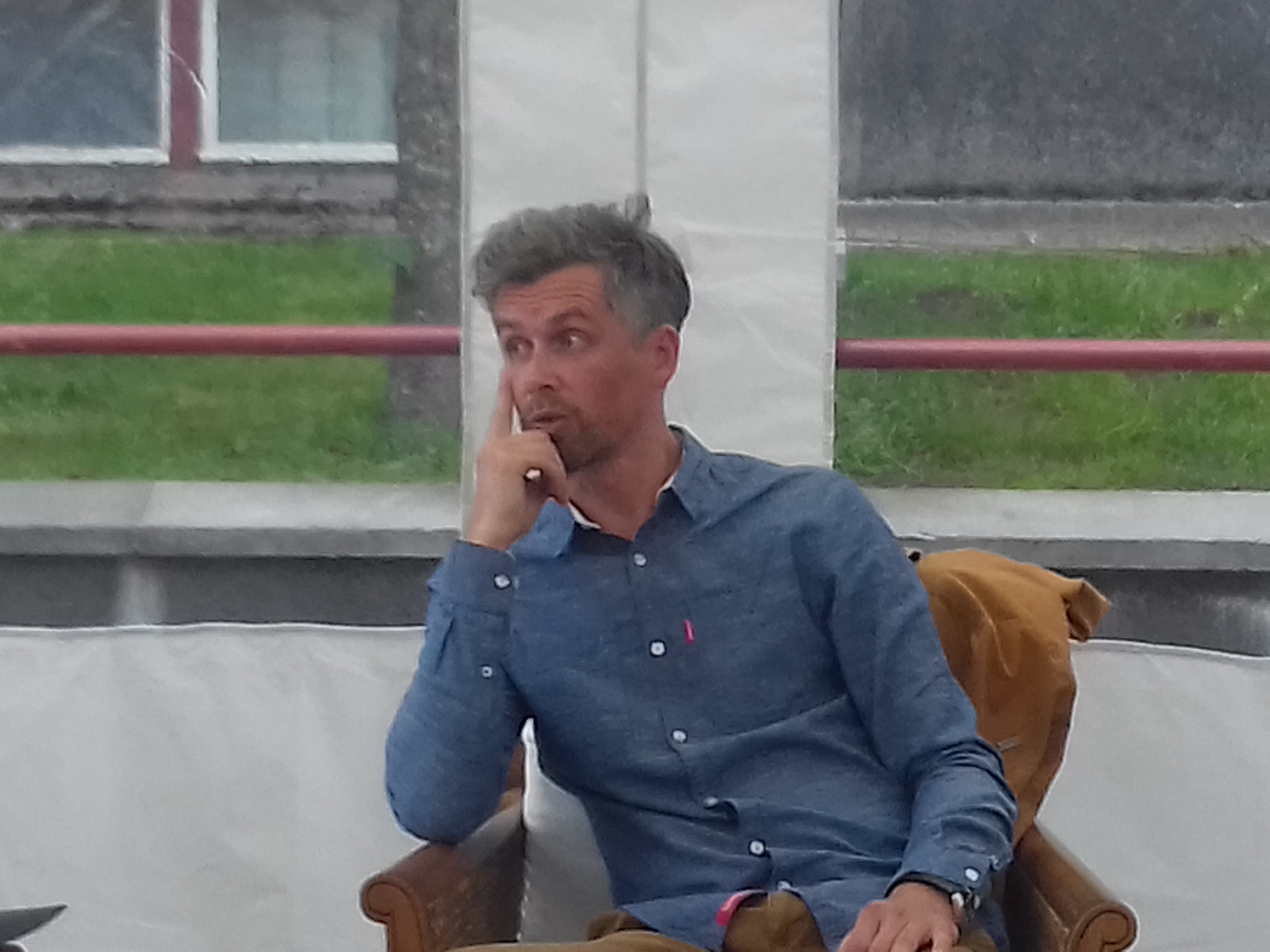
Ermel in 2018

In 2013, Andero Ermel voiced the character of Guard in the Mait Laas directed 3D animated opera film Lisa Limone ja Maroc Orange: Tormakas armulugu; a social critique of African illegal immigrants fleeing to Europe and focusing on Maroc, a refugee boy who is an orange who falls in love with local lemon girl Lisa. Ermel has also provided the Estonian language dubbing for several animated foreign films; in 2012, when the 1994 Disney animated musical film The Lion King was dubbed into the Estonian language, Ermel voiced the character Simba. In 2013, he voiced both the speaking and singing role of Hans in the American Disney animated musical fantasy film Frozen (retitled in Estonian as Lumekuninganna ja igavene talv).

In 2015, he played the role of Oskar Lepik in the Elmo Nüganen directed war film 1944. The film is set in World War II and is shown through the eyes of Estonian soldiers who had to choose sides and thus fight against their fellow countrymen. It was selected as the Estonian entry for the Best Foreign Language Film at the 88th Academy Awards but it was not nominated. In 2022, he appeared as the character Freisinck in the Elmo Nüganen directed historical thriller-mystery Melchior the Apothecary for Taska Film, based on the novel series of the same name by Indrek Hargla.

Anero Ermel's television debut was in the 1998 Vilja Palm directed Eesti Televisioon (ETV) teleplay Koor minu kohvis, which was adapted from the Dennis Potter penned Cream in My Coffee. The teleplay featured actors Ita Ever, Mikk Mikiver, and future long-term partner Külli Teetamm. Other television appearances include a guest role of Lauri Moora on the ETV crime series Ohtlik lend in 2007 and as Johann Loor in two episodes of the popular TV3 comedy-crimes series Kättemaksukontor in 2012.

In 2013, Ermel appeared as a celebrity contestant on TV3's Su nägu kõlab tuttavalt, the Estonian version of Your Face Sounds Familiar, in which celebrities are challenged to perform as different iconic music artists every week, chosen by the show's "Randomiser". They are then judged by the panel of celebrity judges. Ermel's impersonations included Hardi Volmer, Amanda Lear, Marko Matvere, Kurt Cobain of Nirvana, James Blunt, and Freddie Mercury of Queen, among others. He finished third at series end.

== Personal life ==
Andero Ermel had been in a long-term relationship with actress Külli Teetamm. They have two sons, Artur and Rasmus. Rasmus has also become an actor and appeared in a starring role in the 2020 coming-of-age comedy-drama Vee peal. In April 2018, Ermel announced that the coupled had separated. Andero currently resides in Tallinn.
