= Külli Teetamm =

Estonian actress

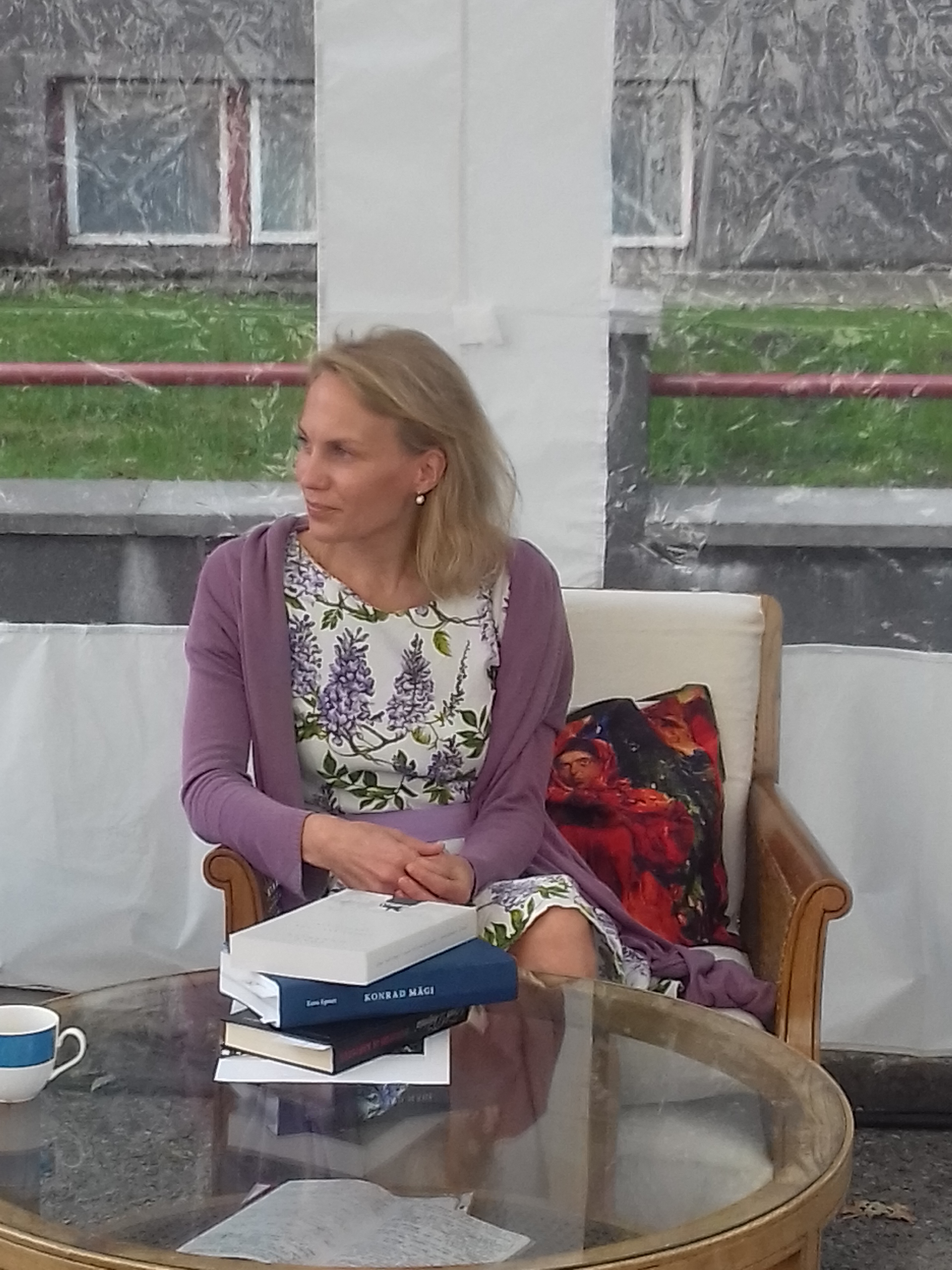
- Born: 22 May 1976 (age 50); Pärnu, then part of Estonian SSR, Soviet Union
- Occupation: Actress
- Years active: 1997-present
- Partners: Andero Ermel (ex-partner)
- Children: 2

Külli Teetamm (born 22 May 1976), is an Estonian stage, television and film actress.

== Early life and education ==
Külli Teetamm was born and attended school in Pärnu. She studied acting at the Estonian Academy of Music and Theatre Drama School (now, the Estonian Academy of Music and Theatre) in Tallinn, graduating in 1998.

== Stage career ==
Following graduation from the Estonian Academy of Music and Theatre Drama School, she joined the Tallinna Linnateater (Tallinn City Theatre), where she is still engaged as an actress. She made her stage debut at the theatre in the role of Hilde in a 1998 production of Henrik Ibsen's The Lady from the Sea. During her career at the Linnateater, she has appeared in roles in productions of such varied authors and playwrights as: Shakespeare (playing Ophelia in a 1999 production of Hamlet), Dostoyevsky, Beckett, Turgenev, Waugh, Tom Stoppard, Ann Jellicoe, Jean-Luc Lagarce, Thomas Mann, and Richard Brautigan, among others. She has appeared in several productions of works by such Estonian authors and playwrights as: Anu Lamp, A. H. Tammsaare, Madis Kõiv, Jaan Tätte and Urmas Lennuk.

== Film and television ==
Külli Teetamm made her television debut as the character of Pille Põder in 1997 in the long-running, popular ETV drama series Õnne 13. She would remain a regular cast member on the series, departing in 2013; the series' twentieth year in production. Between 2015 and 2016, she played the role of Sandra on the Kanal 2 comedy series Pilvede all. She would also appear in several episodes of the TV3 comedy-crime series Kättemaksukontor in 2014.

In 2000, she made her film debut as Anni in the Mare Raidma directed dramatic short Lunastus. This was followed in 2001 by the role of Laima in the Arvo Iho directed feature-length drama Karu süda (English release title: The Heart of the Bear).

== Personal life ==
Külli Teetamm had been in a long-term relationship with actor Andero Ermel for many years and the two have two sons, Artur and Rasmus. Rasmus has also become an actor and appeared in a starring role in the 2020 coming-of-age comedy-drama Vee peal. In April 2018, Ermel announced that the coupled had separated. Teetamm resides in Tallinn.
