= Wigla show =

Estonian television series

Wigla show is an Estonian sketch comedy series created by and featuring Ivar Vigla that aired on Eesti Televisioon from 1989 to 1991 (under the name Ivar Vigla sou) and on Kanal 2 from 1998 to 2000. The Kanal 2 series featured Dan Põldroos, Jan Uuspõld, Egon Nuter, Pille Pürg and Raivo Mets.

== Finnish mark sketch ==
The show is known for its infamous "Finnish mark sketch", which aired on 16 February 1991 and caused a nationwide panic. The sketch was a riff on the Soviet monetary reform of the same year in which 50 and 100-denominated ruble bills were retired and effectively confiscated from circulation. As a result of the reform, many Estonians had exchanged their rubles for Finnish markka, which was seen as a safer currency. The Estonian kroon would not enter circulation until the following year.

The sketch featured Feliks Undusk, a journalist known for hosting various TV shows related to news and politics, solemnly announcing in the middle of the otherwise comical TV show that the Bank of Finland would retire 50 and 100-denominated markka bills from circulation due to the currency's rapid spread outside the country's own borders. Adding to the segment's appearance as a genuine news broadcast was the inclusion of well-known foreign affairs commentator Harri Tiido and banking expert Riho Remmel.

At the end of the broadcast, Undusk interjected the show's catchphrase "leelo-leelo" to indicate that the segment was a comedy sketch. A popular belief is that many viewers had already left their homes in a panic before they could hear the phrase.

After the show aired, long lines formed outside of currency exchanges as viewers were desperate to get rid of their seemingly worthless currency, even at greatly discounted rates. Due to the monetary loss, Harri Tiido would later receive threats from angered viewers in writing as well as over the phone. The ETV headquarters allegedly received a bomb threat as a result of the incident. Several relatives of Vigla and Undusk who had also been deceived by the fake news broadcast refused to speak to them afterwards.

The incident received media attention in Finland and the Finnish government demanded an explanation from the broadcaster. Helsingin Sanomat cited a statement by Tõnu Ots, a press representative for the Estonian government, who had referred to the incident as "psycho-hooliganism".
