= Ladybirds' Christmas =

2001 animated film directed by Janno Põldma and Heiki Ernits

- Directed by: Janno Põldma, Heiki Ernits
- Written by: Andrus Kivirähk, Janno Põldma, Heiki Ernits
- Produced by: Kalev Tamm
- Cinematography: Krista Lepland
- Edited by: Janno Põldma
- Music by: Sven Grünberg
- Distributed by: Joonisfilm
- Release date: 29 November 2001
- Running time: 54 minutes
- Country: Estonia
- Language: Estonian

Ladybirds' Christmas (Estonian: Lepatriinude jõulud) is a 2001 Estonian animated film directed by Janno Põldma and Heiki Ernits. The screenplay is written by Andrus Kivirähk, Janno Põldma and Heiki Ernits.

== Cast ==
- Lembit Ulfsak as Father Christmas and Goga (voice)
- Anu Lamp as Mia (voice)
- Andero Ermel as Tim (voice)
- Kaljo Kiisk as Imanuel (voice)
- Peeter Oja as Salvatore (voice)
- Marko Matvere as Pedro (voice)
- Jan Uuspõld as Jussi (voice)
- Elina Reinold as Leonardo the Cricket (voice)
- Margus Tabor as Flea-Dog and Father (voice)
- Garmen Tabor as Mother (voice)
- Johanna Ulfsak as Child (voice)
