= Pille Pürg =

Estonian actress and parodist (born 1972)

- Born: 9 March 1972 (age 54); Tartu, Estonia
- Education: Helsinki Theatre Academy
- Occupations: Parodist, actress, comedian
- Years active: 1990–present

Pille Pürg (born 9 March 1972) is an Estonian actress, comedian and parodist.

== Early life and education ==
Pürg was born in Tartu. She is known for her work in parody and comedy, including impersonations of well-known Estonian performers.

Pürg graduated from Tartu Secondary School No. 5 in 1990. In 2012, she graduated from the Helsinki Theatre Academy with a degree in television and comedy acting.

== Career ==
From 1991 until 2003, Pürg worked at Vanalinnastuudio in Tallinn as an actress and performance director. She later worked at the Old Baskin's Theatre in Tallinn as a contracted actress. Pürg works predominantly in Estonia, as well as in Finland. She has performed on comedy tours with Madis Milling and Henrik Normann since 2005.

== Selected filmography ==
- 1997–2000: Wigla show
- 2003: Vanad ja kobedad saavad jalad alla (role: Nurse)
- 2003–2004: Õpetajate tuba (role: History teacher Mari Säär)
- 2005: Deus ex machina (role: Annabella)
- 2018: Seltsimees laps (role: Officer's wife)
- 2018: Elu Hammasratastel
