= Tallinn College of Technology =

Estonian high school

- Tallinna Tehnoloogiakolledž

Information
- Other name: Techno TLN
- School type: Vocational college
- Motto: School of the future
- Established: c. 1880
- Director: Ott Pärna
- Campuses: Downtown, Järve, Mustamäe, Lasnamäe
- Nickname: Techno
- Website: techno.ee

The Tallinn College of Technology, also known as Techno TLN, is a newly founded vocational college in Tallinn. The new college was formed by the merger of four Tallinn vocational schools – Tallinn Mechanical School, Tallinn Polytechnic School, Tallinn Industrial Education Center, and Tallinn School of Construction – and offers practical secondary education to more than 6,000 students. The college's director is Ott Pärna. As of January 2026, the only school officially under the new name is the former Mechanical school.

The new college will be opening a modern drone academy at its Mustamäe campus in September 2026.
