= Jan Uuspõld =

Estonian actor and musician

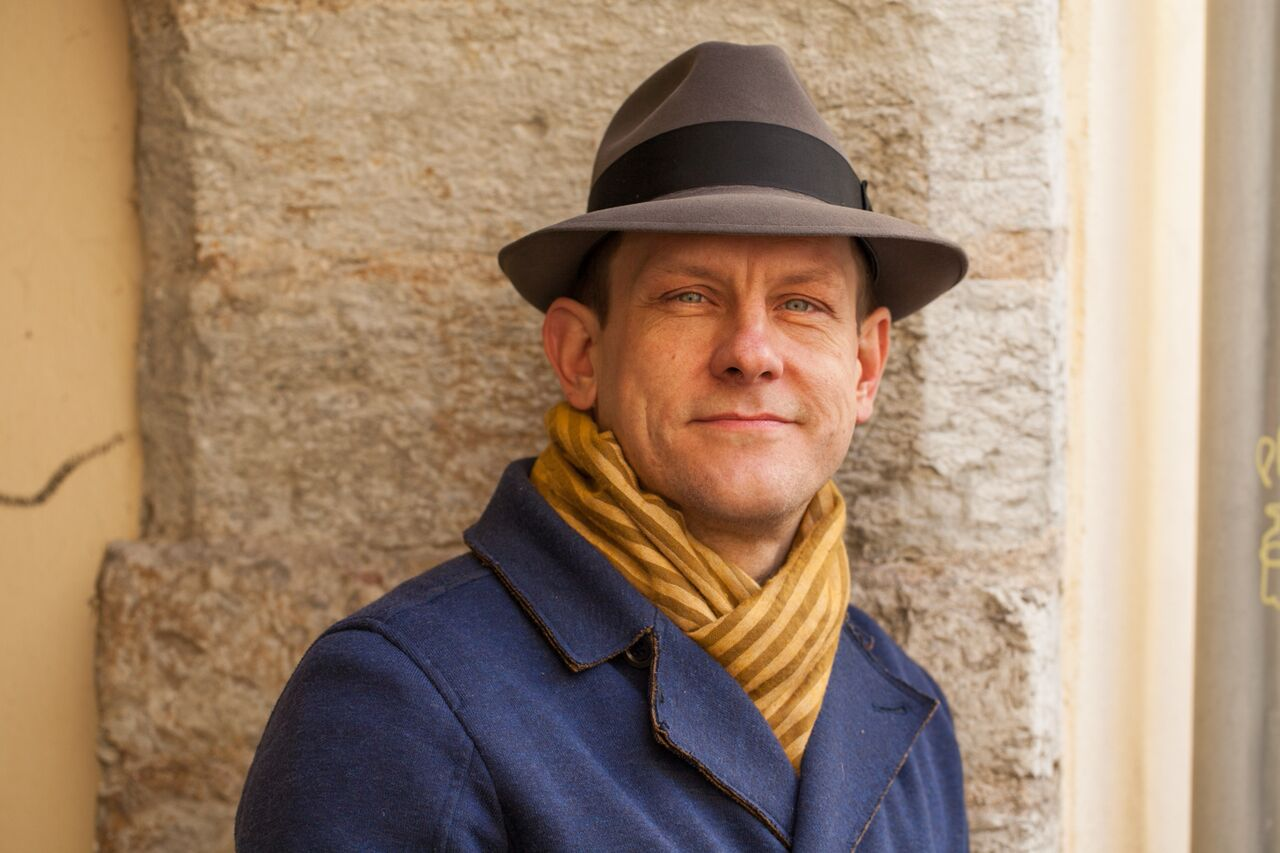
- Born: 14 December 1973 (age 52); Tallinn, then part of Estonian SSR, Soviet Union
- Occupations: Actor, musician
- Spouses: Marion Magdalena Poom (divorced) Gerli Tiganik (m. 2013)
- Website: http://uuspold.ee/en/

Jan Uuspõld (born 14 December 1973) is an Estonian stage, television, radio and film actor and musician.

== Early life and music career ==
Jan Uuspõld was born in Tallinn, the eldest of three sons of Ingar and Heidi Uuspõld. His mother is an accountant and his father was a long-distance truck driver. He was raised mostly in Hiiu, Nõmme and attended schools in Keila and Tallinn. In middle school was enrolled in music class and sang in a school choir. He graduated from Tallinn's 1st Industrial High School in 1991 where he trained as an offset printer.

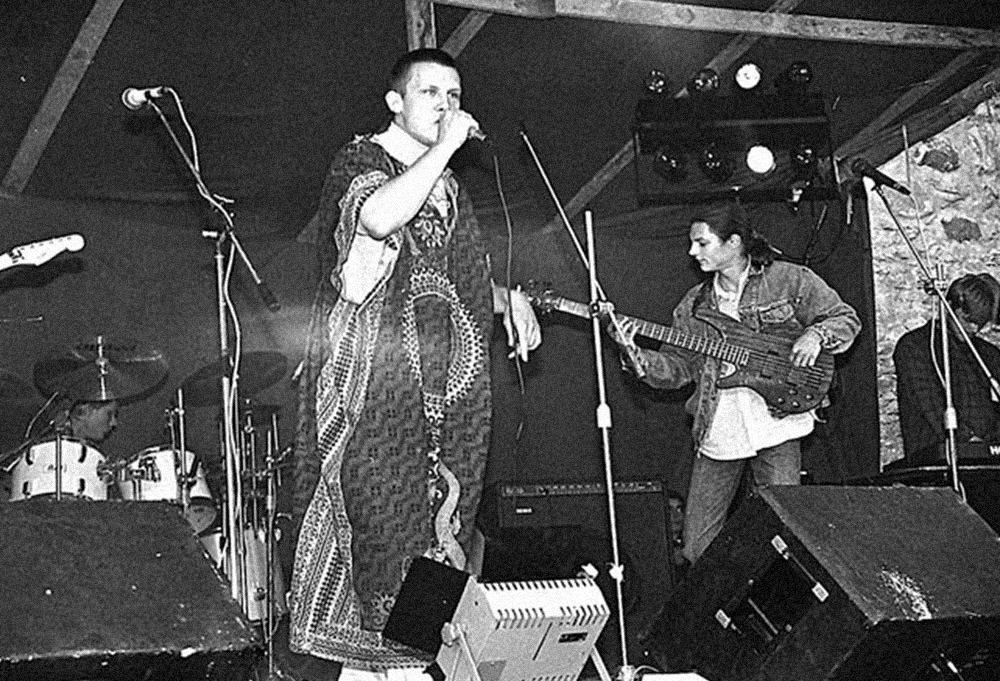
Jan Uuspõld performing with the Luxury Filters.

As a teenager, he wished to become a musician. Influenced in part by the Estonian punk rock band J.M.K.E., he formed a punk band called Trakulla at age fifteen with several classmates and younger brother Andrus after his mother gave him money to buy a guitar. The band went through several music styles and incarnations until eventually being called Luxury Filters and playing predominately jazz and Texas blues inspired songs. After recording several songs, the band appeared on the television Eesti Televisioon (ETV) program 7 vaprat and found a degree of success in Estonia. Their most popular single, "Tramm nr 66", sung by Uuspõld, was released in 1992 when Uuspõld was nineteen. The band folded not long after, but reformed on several occasions, performing on ETV and the 2013 August Blues Festival in Haapsalu.

== Stage career ==
After Luxury Filters broke up, Uuspõld was inspired to become an actor after watching Estonian actor Tõnu Kark perform in a stage production of One Flew Over the Cuckoo's Nest. In 1994 he applied to and was accepted at the EMA Higher Drama School (now, the Estonian Academy of Music and Theatre) in Tallinn, graduating in 1998. Among his graduating classmate were actors Harriet Toompere, Tiit Sukk, Veikko Täär, Liina Vahtrik, and Andero Ermel. While still a student, his course instructor Priit Pedajas offered him an engagement at the Estonian Drama Theatre. He would perform at the Estonian Drama Theatre from 1996 until 2013 in roles by Shakespeare, Ibsen, Dostoyevsky, among many others. From 2005 until 2007 he also performed for two seasons at the Vanemuine theater in Tartu and from 2009 to 2014, with partner Karl Kermes, he created the Monoteater, which staged several plays. In 2013 he developed his own theater production company called Prem Productions.

== Television and film ==
Jan Uuspõld's first film role as an actor was in the 1999 Ervin Õunapuu directed short Kõrbekuu. In 2000, he was cast in the lead role of Leo in the Finnish Yle TV2 television series Siperian Nero!. This was followed in 2001 as a series regular in the Estonian Kanal 2 comedy series Wremja. He would appear in the program as a regular until 2003. He would go on to appear in roles for such television series as: Rikospoliisi ei laula (2006), Ohtlik lend (2006), Kelgukoerad (2007), Brigaad 3 (2007), Kättemaksukontor (2009-2012), among others. In 2004, he appeared on his own television program Jan E. Uuspõld Show on TV3. In 2014 he appeared on the popular reality television program Su nägu kõlab tuttavalt (English: Your Face Sounds Familiar) where celebrity contestants impersonate singers. Uuspõld's impersonations consisted of Justin Bieber, Vesa-Matti Loiri, Shirley Bassey, B.B. King and Fred Astaire. In 2011, he also competed for charity and won performing on Tantsud tähtedega, the Estonian version of Dancing with the Stars.

Since 2015, he has appeared as the character Urmas Kuldnokk on the Kanal 2 weekly television comedy series Takso. In 2019, he began appearing in a starring role as the character Aksel in the Eesti Televisioon (ETV) comedy-drama television series Lahutus Eesti moodi opposite actress Liina Vahtrik. In 2024, he began appearing in the role of Mart in the Ergo Kuld directed TV3 drama Valetamisklubi.

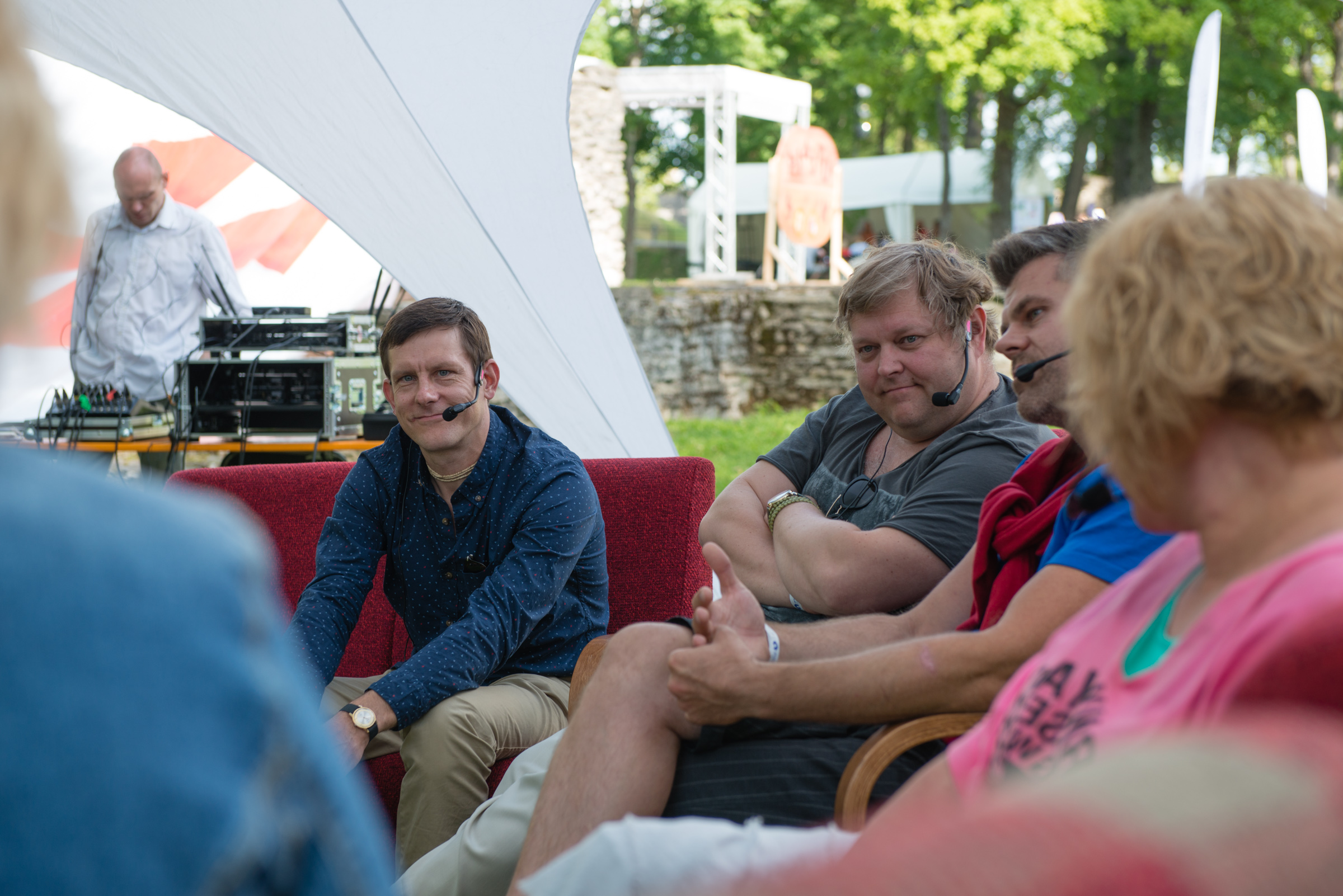
Jan Uuspõld speaking at Arvamusfestival in 2015.

Shortly after leaving the Estonian Drama Theatre, Uuspõld had an idea to create a comedic road movie. After presenting his idea to directors and screenwriters Rain Tolk and Andres Maimik, the three collaborated in making the 2007 comedy Jan Uuspõld läheb Tartusse (English release title: 186 Kilometers). In the film Uuspõld plays a down-on-his-luck caricature of himself, trying to hitchhike from Tallinn to Tartu to perform in a role at the Vanemuine theater. Along the way, he encounters a vision of deceased opera singer Georg Ots, a perverse truck driver, a man kept as a slave, a hippie, neo-Nazis, the Estonian Army and Estonian President Toomas Hendrik Ilves in a cameo appearance, among others. The film premiered in Estonia in 2007 and became the most viewed movie of the year, bringing a record number of people to the cinemas.

In 2021, he appeared in the role of Aadam in the Ergo Kuld directed comedy film Jahihooaeg alongside Harriet Toompere, Mirtel Pohla and Grete Kuld.

== Personal life ==
Jan Uuspõld currently resides in Nõmme with his wife, Gerli Tiganik. The two were married in 2013. He has a daughter, Laura-Lisete, from a previous relationship with Margit Roosaar and was previously married to actress Marion Poom, with whom he has a son, Fred. He previously had a long-term relationship with actress Liina Vahtrik.

== Awards ==
- Estonian Radio Theatre Actor Award for the best radio play (Jörgen - Linnud, Karl Raismik - Noored hinged, Ekke - Domini Cane) (2001)
- Suur Ants, Estonian Drama Theatre Prize (Osvald Alving - Kummitused) (2003)
- Baltic Theatre Festival OmaDRAAMA Actor Award (Eduard Wiiralt - Põrgu wärk) (2006)
- Kaval-Ants, Estonian Drama Theatre Prize for promoting the theatre in a television show, Tantsud tähtedega (2011)
- Oskar Luts Humor Prize (2014)
- Estonian Radio Theatre Actor Award (Reading of A. H. Tammsaare 's novel Põrgupõhja uus Vanapagan) (2018)

== Selected filmography ==
- Something Real (Estonian: Midagi tõelist) (2026)
- What a Bumpkin! (Estonian: Säärane mulk) (2026)
- Jan Uuspõld Goes Home (Estonian: Jan Uuspõld läheb koju) (2025)
- 8 Views of Lake Biwa (Estonian: Biwa järve 8 nägu) (2024)
- Melchior the Apothecary. The Executioner's Daughter (Estonian: Apteeker Melchior. Timuka tütar) (2022)
- Swing, Axe and the Tree of Eternal Love (Estonian: Kiik, Kirves ja Igavese Armastuse Puu) (2022)
- Hunting Season (Estonian: Jahihooaeg) (2021)
- Estonian Funeral (Estonian: Eesti matus) (2021)
- Raggie (Estonian: Sipsik; animated feature, voice) (2020)
- Kratt (2020)
- Asjad, millest me ei räägi (2020)
- Vanamehe film (animated feature, voice) (2019)
- The Manslayer/The Virgin/The Shadow (Estonian: Mehetapja/Süütu/Vari) (2017)
- Swingers (Estonian: Svingerid) (2017)
- The Spy and the Poet (Estonian: Luuraja ja Luuletaja) (2016)
- Free Range (Estonian: Free Range: Ballaad maailma heakskiitmisest) (2013)
- Vasha (2009)
- 186 Kilometers (Estonian release title: Jan Uuspõld läheb Tartusse) (2007)
- Hundi agoonia (2006)
- Ruudi (2006)
- Frank and Wendy (Estonian: Frank ja Wendy, animated feature, voice) (2004)
- Somnambulance (Estonian: Somnambuul) (2003)
- Made in Estonia (Estonian release title: Vanad ja kobedad saavad jalad alla) (2003)
- Ladybirds' Christmas (Estonian: Lepatriinude jõulud; animated feature, voice) (2001)
