= Üllar Saaremäe =

Estonian actor, director, politician, and singer

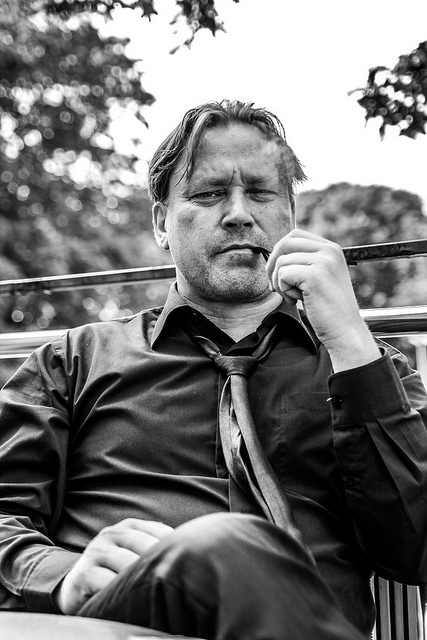
- Saaremäe in 2013
- Born: 23 November 1969 (age 56); Kohtla-Nõmme, then part of Estonian SSR, Soviet Union
- Occupations: actor, politician
- Years active: 1987–present
- Partner: Ketlin Kütt

Üllar Saaremäe (born November 23, 1969) is an Estonian actor, director, politician, and punk band singer.

== Biography ==
Üllar Saaremäe was born 23 November 1969 in Kohtla-Nõmme.

He has two children from his relationship with actress Tiina Mälberg: Karl Robert and Marii Ingriin.

He was the creator and producer of the Estonian Punk Song Festival in 2008, for which he received the Estonian Volunteer of the Year national award.

Saaremäe is also involved in politics; he is a member of the conservative Pro Patria party and from 2009–2013 was a member of the Rakvere City Council. From 2017–2018, he was a member of the Kadrina Rural Municipality Council, and he has been a Lääne-Viru County electoral district member of the XIV Riigikogu since 2019.

== Filmography ==
=== Films ===
Year	Film	Role	Film gross	Notes
1997	Minu Leninid	Aleksander Kesküla		
2004	Täna öösel me ei maga	The Pimp		
2004	Sigade revolutsioon	Commander of Hundissaare		
2005	Stiilipidu	Jaan		
2005	Malev	Wolfram		
2005	Vana daami visiit	Bodyguard		
2012	Seenelkäik	Local redneck		
2013	Elavad pildid	Jüri		
2017	Mehetapja/Süütu/Vari	Johorka		
2019	Johannes Pääsukese tõeline elu	Kõrtsu-Ruudi		
2022	Kalev	Gert's Father		
2023	Tume paradiis	Andres		

=== Television ===
Year	Title	Role	Notes
1993 to present	Õnne 13	Kaido Prillop	
2006	Hajameelselt abielus	Peeter	
2007	Ohtlik lend	Toomas	
2008	Tuulepealne maa	Karl Ploompuu	
2008	Kelgukoerad	Mikk	
2009	Kättemaksukontor	Almer Roots	
2010	Kodu keset linna	Rasmus	
2010	Klass: Elu pärast	Väino's colleague	
2014 to 2016	Viimane võmm	Mikk Kotkas	
2016	Siberi võmm	Mikk Kotkas	
