= Kristel Leesmend =

Estonian actress (born 1968)

- Born: August 30, 1968 (age 57); Tallinn, then part of Estonian SSR, Soviet Union
- Occupation: Actress
- Years active: 1987–present
- Notable work: Tallinn pimeduses; Jüri Rumm; Ruudi; Surnuaiavahi tütar
- Partner: Ivo Uukkivi
- Children: 1

Kristel Leesmend (born 30 August 1968) is an Estonian actress.

== Early life and education ==
Leesmend was born on 30 August 1968 in Tallinn.

From 1987 until 1988, Leesmend worked at the Vanalinnastuudio in Tallinn as a costume designer and as a freelance actress.

In 1992 she graduated from Estonian Academy of Music and Theatre's Drama School and has been a freelance actress since. In 2002, she worked as a supervisor at the Tallinn University of Technology's student theatre, T-Theater.

== Career ==
From 2003 until 2006, she director of casting for the Estonian Casting Agency (Allfilm). Besides theatrical roles she has also played in several films.

== Personal life ==
Leesmend was in a relationship with actor Ivo Uukkivi, the pair have a daughter, born in 1995, with whom she has a very close relationship.

== Selected filmography ==
- 1993 Tallinn pimeduses (feature film; role: Department store salesclerk)
- 1994 Jüri Rumm (feature film; role Eliisabet)
- 2006 Ruudi (feature film; role: Nurse)
- 2008 Doktor Kloun (documentary film; director and scenarist)
- 2011 Surnuaiavahi tütar (feature film; role: Ilse)
- 2012 Üksik saar (feature film; role: Sick woman)
- 2012 Kõik muusikud on kaabakad (feature film; role: Külli)
- 2016 Mäel (short film; role: Maria)
