= Garmen Tabor =

Estonian actress and theatre director

Garmen Tabor (née Suurmets; born 19 April 1968) is an Estonian actress and theatre director.

Tabor was born in Rakvere. In 1992 she graduated from the Tallinn State Conservatory's Performing Arts Department. From 1992 until 2002, she worked at Estonian Drama Theatre, 2002–2003 at Vanalinnastuudio. 2003–2007 she was a freelance actress. 2005–2008 she worked at Kuressaare Linnateater. 2009–2011 she was stage manager (Estonian: näitejuht) and director at Estonia Theatre. Since 2019 she is the head of Ugala Theatre. Besides theatre roles, she has appeared in films; she has given voice to several animated film characters, and has appeared on television.

She has been married to actor Margus Tabor since 1989.

== Filmography ==
- 1993: Darkness in Tallinn (role: Diana)
- 1995–2017: Õnne 13 (Anne-Mai)
- 2001: Ladybirds' Christmas (animated film; in the role: Mother (voice))
- 2005: Mis värvi on armastus?
- 2005: Tuul
- 2006: Leiutajateküla Lotte (animated film; in the role: Anna (voice))
- 2007: Must lagi (role: Poetry reader)
- 2007: Kelgukoerad (role: Dr. Sarap)
- 2007: Sügiseleegia (animated film; in the role: Betty)
- 2011: Lotte ja kuukivi saladus (animated film; in the role: Lotte's mother Anna (voice))
- 2014: Landscape with Many Moons (Naine)
- 2014: Revenge Office (role: Emeli Fresen)
- 2019: Lotte ja kadunud lohed (animated film; in the role: Hilde (voice))
