= List of animated feature films of the 2000s =

Lists of animated feature films released in the 2000s organized by year of release:

- List of animated feature films of 2000
- List of animated feature films of 2001
- List of animated feature films of 2002
- List of animated feature films of 2003
- List of animated feature films of 2004
- List of animated feature films of 2005
- List of animated feature films of 2006
- List of animated feature films of 2007
- List of animated feature films of 2008
- List of animated feature films of 2009

== See also ==
- List of highest-grossing animated films of the 2000s
