= List of highest-grossing animated films of the 2000s =

The following are lists of the highest-grossing animated films of the 2000s.

== Highest-grossing animated films of the 2000s ==
Figures are given in U.S. dollars (USD). DreamWorks Animation is the most represented animation studio with 13 films on the list and has the highest total of any animation studio in that decade. Distributors listed are for the original theatrical release.

Top 50
Rank	Title	Country	Production company	Distributor	Worldwide gross	Year	Ref
1	Finding Nemo	U.S.	Pixar Animation Studios	Walt Disney Pictures	$940,335,536	2003	
2	Shrek 2	U.S.	DreamWorks Animation/Pacific Data Images	DreamWorks Pictures	$933,848,612	2004	
3	Ice Age: Dawn of the Dinosaurs	U.S.	20th Century Fox Animation/Blue Sky Studios	20th Century Fox	$886,686,817	2009	
4	Shrek the Third	U.S.	DreamWorks Animation/Pacific Data Images	Paramount Pictures	$798,958,162	2007	
5	Up	U.S.	Pixar Animation Studios	Walt Disney Pictures	$735,099,082	2009	
6	Ice Age: The Meltdown	U.S.	20th Century Fox Animation/Blue Sky Studios	20th Century Fox	$660,940,780	2006	
7	The Incredibles	U.S.	Pixar Animation Studios	Walt Disney Pictures	$633,019,734	2004	
8	Kung Fu Panda	U.S.	DreamWorks Animation	Paramount Pictures	$631,744,560	2008	
9	Ratatouille	U.S.	Pixar Animation Studios	Walt Disney Pictures	$623,722,818	2007	
10	Madagascar: Escape 2 Africa	U.S.	DreamWorks Animation/Pacific Data Images	Paramount Pictures	$603,900,354	2008	
11	Monsters, Inc.	U.S.	Pixar Animation Studios	Walt Disney Pictures	$577,425,734	2001	
12	WALL-E	U.S.	Pixar Animation Studios	Walt Disney Pictures	$533,281,433	2008	
13	Madagascar	U.S.	DreamWorks Animation/Pacific Data Images	DreamWorks Pictures	$532,680,671	2005	
14	The Simpsons Movie	U.S.	20th Century Fox Animation/Gracie Films	20th Century Fox	$527,071,022	2007	
15	Shrek	U.S.	DreamWorks Animation/Pacific Data Images	DreamWorks Pictures	$484,409,218	2001	
16	Cars	U.S.	Pixar Animation Studios	Walt Disney Pictures	$461,983,149	2006	
17	Happy Feet	Australia/U.S.	Village Roadshow Pictures/Animal Logic/Kennedy Miller Productions	Warner Bros.	$384,335,608	2006	
18	Ice Age	U.S.	20th Century Fox Animation/Blue Sky Studios	20th Century Fox	$383,257,136	2002	
19	Monsters vs. Aliens	U.S.	DreamWorks Animation	Paramount Pictures	$381,509,870	2009	
20	Shark Tale	U.S.	DreamWorks Animation	DreamWorks Pictures	$367,275,019	2004	
21	Spirited Away	Japan	Studio Ghibli	Tokuma Shoten	$365,000,000	2001	
22	Dinosaur	U.S.	Walt Disney Animation Studios/Secret Lab	Walt Disney Pictures	$349,822,765	2000	
23	Over the Hedge	U.S.	DreamWorks Animation	Paramount Pictures	$336,002,996	2006	
24	A Christmas Carol	U.S.	ImageMovers/ImageMovers Digital	Walt Disney Pictures	$325,286,646	2009	
25	Chicken Little	U.S.	Walt Disney Animation Studios	Walt Disney Pictures	$314,432,837	2005	
26	Bolt	U.S.	Walt Disney Animation Studios	Walt Disney Pictures	$309,979,994	2008	
27	The Polar Express	U.S.	ImageMovers/Castle Rock Entertainment/Shangri-La Entertainment/Playtone	Warner Bros.	$307,514,317	2004	
28	Dr. Seuss' Horton Hears a Who!	U.S.	20th Century Fox Animation/Blue Sky Studios	20th Century Fox	$297,138,014	2008	
29	Bee Movie	U.S.	DreamWorks Animation	Paramount Pictures	$287,594,577	2007	
30	Lilo & Stitch	U.S.	Walt Disney Animation Studios	Walt Disney Pictures	$273,144,151	2002	
31	The Princess and the Frog	U.S.	Walt Disney Animation Studios	Walt Disney Pictures	$267,045,765	2009	
32	Robots	U.S.	20th Century Fox Animation/Blue Sky Studios	20th Century Fox	$260,718,330	2005	
33	Brother Bear	U.S.	Walt Disney Animation Studios	Walt Disney Pictures	$250,397,798	2003	
34	Cloudy with a Chance of Meatballs	U.S.	Sony Pictures Animation/Sony Pictures Imageworks	Columbia Pictures	$243,006,126	2009	
35	Howl's Moving Castle	Japan	Studio Ghibli	Tokuma Shoten	$235,184,110	2004	
36	Chicken Run	U.K./U.S.	DreamWorks Animation/Aardman Animations/Pathé	DreamWorks Pictures	$224,834,564	2000	
37	Ponyo	Japan	Studio Ghibli	Tokuma Shoten	$201,750,937	2008	
38	Open Season	U.S.	Sony Pictures Animation/Sony Pictures Imageworks	Columbia Pictures	$197,309,027	2006	
39	Beowulf	U.S.	ImageMovers/Shangri-La Entertainment	Paramount Pictures	$196,393,745	2007	
40	Wallace and Gromit: The Curse of the Were-Rabbit	U.K./U.S.	DreamWorks Animation/Aardman Animations	DreamWorks Pictures	$192,610,372	2005	
41	Atlantis: The Lost Empire	U.S.	Walt Disney Animation Studios	Walt Disney Pictures	$186,053,725	2001	
42	Flushed Away	U.K./U.S.	DreamWorks Animation/Aardman Animations	Paramount Pictures	$178,120,015	2006	
43	Meet the Robinsons	U.S.	Walt Disney Animation Studios	Walt Disney Pictures	$169,333,034	2007	
44	The Emperor's New Groove	U.S.	Walt Disney Animation Studios	Walt Disney Pictures	$169,327,687	2000	
45	Surf's Up	U.S.	Sony Pictures Animation/Sony Pictures Imageworks	Columbia Pictures	$149,044,513	2007	
46	Monster House	U.S.	ImageMovers/Amblin Entertainment	Columbia Pictures	$140,175,006	2006	
47	The SpongeBob SquarePants Movie	U.S.	Nickelodeon Movies/United Plankton Pictures	Paramount Pictures	$140,161,792	2004	
48	The Jungle Book 2	U.S.	DisneyToon Studios	Walt Disney Pictures	$135,703,599	2003	
49	Coraline	U.S.	Laika/Pandemonium Films	Focus Features	$124,596,397	2009	
50	Spirit: Stallion of the Cimarron	U.S.	DreamWorks Animation	DreamWorks Pictures	$122,563,539	2002	

=== Highest-grossing film by year ===
DreamWorks Animation is the most represented studio with 4 films on this list. Ice Age is the most represented animated franchise with 3 films on this list.

Year	Title	Studio	Worldwide gross	Budget	Ref(s)
2000	Dinosaur	Disney/Walt Disney Feature Animation	$349,822,765	$127,500,000	
2001	Monsters, Inc.	Disney/Pixar	$632,316,649 ($525,373,250)	$115,000,000	
2002	Ice Age	20th Century Fox/Blue Sky Studios	$383,257,136	$59,000,000	
2003	Finding Nemo	Disney/Pixar	$940,350,086 ($867,893,978)	$94,000,000	
2004	Shrek 2	DreamWorks/DreamWorks Animation	$923,075,336	$150,000,000	
2005	Madagascar	DreamWorks/DreamWorks Animation	$532,680,671	$75,000,000	
2006	Ice Age: The Meltdown	20th Century Fox/Blue Sky Studios	$661,483,908	$80,000,000	
2007	Shrek the Third	Paramount/DreamWorks Animation	$798,958,162	$160,000,000	
2008	Kung Fu Panda	Paramount/DreamWorks Animation	$631,744,560	$130,000,000	
2009	Ice Age: Dawn of the Dinosaurs	20th Century Fox/Blue Sky Studios	$886,686,817	$90,000,000	

== See also ==
- List of animated feature films of the 2000s

== Notes ==
Release Notes
