= List of adventure films of the 2000s =

A list of adventure films released in the 2000s.

== 2000 ==
Title	Director	Cast	Country	Subgenre/Notes
102 Dalmatians	Kevin Lima	Glenn Close, Gérard Depardieu, Ioan Gruffudd, Alice Evans	United States	Family-oriented adventure
The Adventures of Rocky and Bullwinkle	Des McAnuff	Robert De Niro, Rene Russo, Jason Alexander, Piper Perabo	United States	Live-action/animated film, adventure comedy
Amazon	Philippe de Broca	Jean-Paul Belmondo, Arielle Dombasle, Patrick Bouchitey	France; Spain	Adventure comedy
The Beach	Danny Boyle	Leonardo DiCaprio, Tilda Swinton, Virginie Ledoyen	United States	Adventure drama
Cast Away	Robert Zemeckis	Tom Hanks, Helen Hunt, Chris Noth	United States	Adventure drama
Chicken Run	Nick Park, Peter Lord	Mel Gibson (voice), Julia Sawalha (voice), Miranda Richardson (voice), Jane Horrocks (voice)	United States; United Kingdom	Animated film, Adventure comedy
Crouching Tiger, Hidden Dragon	Ang Lee	Chow Yun-fat, Michelle Yeoh, Zhang Ziyi	China; Hong Kong; Taiwan; United States	Romantic adventure
Dinosaur	Eric Leighton, Ralph Zondag	D. B. Sweeney (voice), Ossie Davis (voice), Alfre Woodard (voice)	United States	Animated film, family-oriented adventure
Don Quixote	Peter Yates	John Lithgow, Bob Hoskins, Isabella Rossellini, Lambert Wilson	United States	
Dungeons & Dragons	Courtney Solomon	Justin Whalin, Marlon Wayans, Thora Birch	United States; Czech Republic	
Gladiator	Ridley Scott	Russell Crowe, Joaquin Phoenix, Oliver Reed, Connie Nielsen, Richard Harris	United States; United Kingdom	
I Dreamed of Africa	Hugh Hudson	Kim Basinger, Vincent Perez, Eva Marie Saint, Daniel Craig	United States	
The King's Guard	Jonathan Tydor	Trevor St. John, Ashley Jones, Eric Roberts, Ron Perlman	United States	
Mission to Mars	Brian De Palma	Gary Sinise, Tim Robbins	United States	Space adventure
O Brother, Where Art Thou?	Joel Coen	George Clooney, John Turturro, Tim Blake	United States	
Orpheus and Eurydice	Paul Pissanos	Andrew Bullock, Carolina Liriti, David Bowles, Oliver Reed	Greece	
The Perfect Storm	Wolfgang Petersen	George Clooney, Mark Wahlberg, John C. Reilly	United States	Sea adventure, adventure drama
Prince of Central Park	John Leekley	Kathleen Turner, Danny Aiello, Cathy Moriarty, Frankie Nasso, Harvey Keitel	United States	
Le Prince du Pacifique	Alain Corneau	Thierry Lhermitte, Patrick Timsit, Marie Trintignant	France	Adventure comedy
Red Planet	Antony Hoffman	Val Kilmer, Carrie-Anne Moss	United States	Space adventure
The Road to El Dorado	Don Paul and Bibo Bergeron	Kenneth Branagh (voice), Kevin Kline (voice), Rosie Perez (voice)	United States	Animated film, family-oriented adventure
Sinbad: Beyond the Veil of Mists	Alan Jacobs		United States	Fantasy adventure
Space Cowboys	Clint Eastwood	Clint Eastwood, Donald Sutherland, Tommy Lee Jones, James Garner	United States	Space adventure
Supernova	Thomas Lee	James Spader, Angela Bassett, Robert Forster	United States	Space adventure
Thomas and the Magic Railroad	Britt Allcroft	Alec Baldwin, Mara Wilson, Peter Fonda	United Kingdom; United States	Family-oriented adventure
Titan A.E.	Don Bluth, Gary Goldman	Matt Damon (voice), Drew Barrymore (voice), Bill Pullman (voice)	United States	Animated film, space adventure
Tweety's High-Flying Adventure	James T. Walker	Joe Alaskey (voice), June Foray (voice)	United States	Animated film, family-oriented adventure
U-571	Jonathan Mostow	Matthew McConaughey, Bill Paxton, Harvey Keitel	United States	War adventure, sea adventure
Vertical Limit	Martin Campbell	Chris O'Donnell, Bill Paxton, Robin Tunney, Scott Glenn, Izabella Scorupco	United States	Mountaineering adventure
Voyage of the Unicorn	Philip Spink	Beau Bridges, Heather McEwen, C. Ernst Harth	United States	
X-Men	Bryan Singer	Hugh Jackman, Patrick Stewart, Ian McKellen, Famke Janssen	United States	

== 2001 ==
Title	Director	Cast	Country	Subgenre/Notes
Amazons and Gladiators	Zachary Weintraub	Patrick Bergin, Jennifer Rubin	Australia	
Atlantis: The Lost Empire	Gary Trousdale, Kirk Wise	Michael J. Fox (voice), Cree Summer (voice), James Garner (voice)	United States	Animated film, fantasy adventure
Attila	Dick Lowry	Gerard Butler, Powers Boothe, Simmone Mackinnon	United States	
Back to the Secret Garden	Michael Tuchner	Camilla Belle	United Kingdom	Family-oriented adventure
Black Knight	Gil Junger	Martin Lawrence, Tom Wilkinson, Marsha Thomason	United States	Adventure comedy
Brotherhood of the Wolf	Christophe Gans	Samuel Le Bihan, Vincent Cassel, Monica Bellucci, Mark Dacascos	France	
The Bunker	Rob Green	Jason Flemyng, Charley Boorman, Jack Davenport	United Kingdom	War adventure
Cats & Dogs	Lawrence Guterman	Jeff Goldblum, Elizabeth Perkins, Alexander Pollock	United States; Australia	
Daresalam	Issa Serge Coelo	Haikal Zakaria, Abdoulaye Ahmat	Chad	
The Diamond of Jeru	Dick Lowry, Ian Barry	Billy Zane, Keith Carradine	United States; Australia	
Elsewhere	Nikolaus Geyrhalter		Austria; Niger; Finland; Micronesia; Australia; China; Greenland	
Final Fantasy: The Spirits Within	Hironobu Sakaguchi, Motonori Sakakibara	Ming-Na Wen (voice), Alec Baldwin (voice), Ving Rhames (voice)	United States	Animated film, space adventure
Harry Potter and the Philosopher's Stone	Chris Columbus	Daniel Radcliffe, Emma Watson, Rupert Grint	United Kingdom; United States	Fantasy adventure
High Adventure	Mark Roper	Thomas Ian Griffith, Anja Kling, Götz Otto	Canada; United Kingdom; Italy; Bulgaria	
In Desert and Wilderness	Gavin Hood	Karolina Sawka, Adam Fidusiewicz, Artur Żmijewski	Poland	
Jimmy Neutron: Boy Genius	John A. Davis	Megan Cavanagh (voice), Mark DeCarlo (voice), Debi Derryberry (voice)	United States	Animated film, Space adventure
Jurassic Park III	Joe Johnston	Sam Neill, William H. Macy, Téa Leoni, Alessandro Nivola, Trevor Morgan, Michael Jeter	United States	
A Knight's Tale	Brian Helgeland	Heath Ledger, Mark Addy, Rufus Sewell	United States	
The Knights of the Quest	Pupi Avati	Raoul Bova, Edward Furlong, Thomas Kretschmann, F. Murray Abraham	Italy; France	
Lady and the Tramp II: Scamp's Adventure	Jeannine Roussel, Darrell Rooney	Scott Wolf (voice), Alyssa Milano (voice), Chazz Palminteri (voice)	United States	Animated film, Family oriented adventure
Lagaan: Once Upon a Time in India	Ashutosh Gowariker	Aamir Khan	India	
Lara Croft: Tomb Raider	Simon West	Angelina Jolie, Jon Voight, Noah Taylor, Daniel Craig	United States	Fantasy adventure
The Legend of Suriyothai	Chatrichalerm Yukol	Piyapas Bhirombhakdi, Sarunyoo Wongkrachang, Chatchai Plengpanich	Thailand	
The Legend of Zu	Tsui Hark	Zhang Ziyi, Cecilia Cheung, Kelly Lin	Hong Kong; China	Fantasy adventure
Lenya – Die größte Kriegerin aller Zeiten	Michael Rowitz	Anja Knauer, Sonja Kirchberger	Germany	Fantasy adventure
The Lord of the Rings: The Fellowship of the Ring	Peter Jackson	Elijah Wood, Ian McKellen, Ian Holm	United States; New Zealand	Fantasy adventure
The Mummy Returns	Stephen Sommers	Brendan Fraser, Rachel Weisz, John Hannah, Arnold Vosloo, Dwayne Johnson	United States	Adventure comedy
The Musketeer	Peter Hyams	Justin Chambers, Catherine Deneuve, Mena Suvari, Stephen Rea, Tim Roth	United States	
The Old Man Who Read Love Stories	Rolf de Heer	Richard Dreyfuss, Timothy Spall, Hugo Weaving	Australia; Netherlands; Spain; France	Adventure drama
The Other Side of Heaven	Mitch Davis	Christopher Gorham, Anne Hathaway	United States	Adventure drama
Princess of Thieves	Peter Hewitt	Keira Knightley, Stephen Moyer, Malcolm McDowell	United States; United Kingdom	
The Sea Wolf	Mark Roper	Thomas Ian Griffith, Gerit Kling	Canada; United Kingdom; Italy; Cuba	Sea adventure also known as SeaWolf: The Pirate's Curse
She	Timothy Bond	Ophélie Winter, Ian Duncan, Marie Bäumer, Götz Otto, Christoph Waltz	Canada; United Kingdom; Italy	
Shrek	Andrew Adamson, Vicky Jenson	Mike Myers (voice), Eddie Murphy (voice), Cameron Diaz (voice), John Lithgow (voice)	United States	Animated film family-oriented adventure
Spirited Away	Hayao Miyazaki	Rumi Hiiragi (voice), Miyu Irino (voice), Suzanne Pleshette (voice)	Japan	Animated film, fantasy adventure
Spy Kids	Robert Rodriguez	Antonio Banderas, Carla Gugino, Alexa Vega	United States	Family-oriented adventure

== 2002 ==
Title	Director	Cast	Country	Subgenre/Notes
The Adventures of Pluto Nash	Ron Underwood	Eddie Murphy, Randy Quaid, Rosario Dawson	United States	Space adventure
Asterix & Obelix: Mission Cleopatra	Alain Chabat	Gérard Depardieu, Christian Clavier, Monica Bellucci	France; Germany; Italy	
Balto II: Wolf Quest	Phil Weinstein		United States	Animated film, Family-oriented adventure
Below	David N. Twohy	Bruce Greenwood, Olivia Williams, Holt McCallany	United States	War adventure
Blanche	Bernie Bonvoisin	Lou Doillon, Jean Rochefort, Carole Bouquet, Gérard Depardieu	France	
Le Boulet	Alain Berbérian	Gérard Lanvin, Benoît Poelvoorde, José Garcia, Djimon Hounsou	France	Adventure comedy
Corto Maltese, la cour secrète des arcanes	Pascal Morelli		France	Animated film
The Count of Monte Cristo	Kevin Reynolds	James Caviezel, Guy Pearce, Dagmara Dominczyk, Richard Harris	United States	
The Crocodile Hunter: Collision Course	John Stainton	Steve Irwin, Terri Irwin, Magda Szubanski	Australia	Adventure comedy
Crusade of Vengeance	Byron W. Thompson	Joanna Pacula, Rutger Hauer	United States; Ireland; Lithuania	
Die Another Day	Lee Tamahori	Pierce Brosnan, Halle Berry, Toby Stephens, Rosamund Pike, Judi Dench, John Cleese	United Kingdom; United States	
The Four Feathers	Shekhar Kapur	Heath Ledger, Wes Bentley, Kate Hudson	United States; United Kingdom	
Harry Potter and the Chamber of Secrets	Chris Columbus	Daniel Radcliffe, Rupert Grint, Emma Watson	United States; United Kingdom	Fantasy adventure
Hero	Zhang Yimou	Jet Li, Maggie Cheung, Donnie Yen, Zhang Ziyi	China	
Ice Age	Chris Wedge, Carlos Saldanha	Ray Romano (voice), John Leguizamo (voice), Denis Leary (voice)	United States	Animated film, family-oriented adventure
K-19: The Widowmaker	Kathryn Bigelow	Harrison Ford, Liam Neeson	United States	Sea adventure
The Lord of the Rings: The Two Towers	Peter Jackson	Elijah Wood, Ian McKellen, Liv Tyler, Viggo Mortensen	United States; New Zealand	Fantasy adventure
Les Oreilles sur le dos	Xavier Durringer	Béatrice Dalle, Gérald Laroche, Éric Savin	France	
Rabbit-Proof Fence	Phillip Noyce	Everlyn Sampi, Tianna Sansbury, Kenneth Branagh, David Gulpilil	Australia	Adventure drama
The Race	Djamel Bensalah	Hélène de Fougerolles, Roschdy Zem, Atmen Kelif, Lorànt Deutsch, Julien Courbey, Josiane Balasko, Gérard Jugnot	France	Adventure comedy
Reign of Fire	Rob Bowman	Matthew McConaughey, Christian Bale, Izabella Scorupco, Gerard Butler	United States	Fantasy adventure
Scooby-Doo	Raja Gosnell	Freddie Prinze Jr., Sarah Michelle Gellar, Matthew Lillard, Linda Cardellini	United States	Family-oriented adventure, Fantasy adventure
The Scorpion King	Chuck Russell	Dwayne Johnson, Steven Brand, Michael Clarke Duncan, Kelly Hu	United States	Fantasy adventure
Snow Dogs	Brian Levant	Cuba Gooding Jr., James Coburn	United States	Family-oriented adventure
Spy Kids 2: The Island of Lost Dreams	Robert Rodriguez	Antonio Banderas, Carla Gugino, Alexa Vega	United States	Family-oriented adventure
Star Trek: Nemesis	Stuart Baird	Patrick Stewart, Jonathan Frakes, Brent Spiner, Levar Burton	United States	
Star Wars: Episode II – Attack of the Clones	George Lucas	Ewan McGregor, Natalie Portman, Hayden Christensen, Christopher Lee	United States	
Stranded	Charles Beeson	Liam Cunningham, Jesse Spencer	United States	Family-oriented adventure
The Time Machine	Simon Wells	Guy Pearce, Jeremy Irons	United States	Science fiction adventure
Treasure Planet	Ron Clements, John Musker	Joseph Gordon-Levitt (voice), Brian Murray (voice), David Hyde Pierce (voice)	United States	Animated film, family-oriented adventure, space adventure
xXx	Rob Cohen	Vin Diesel	United States	

== 2003 ==
Title	Director	Cast	Country	Subgenre/Notes
2 Fast 2 Furious	John Singleton	Paul Walker, Tyrese Gibson	United States	
Agent Cody Banks	Harald Zwart	Frankie Muniz, Hilary Duff	United States	Family-oriented adventure
And Starring Pancho Villa as Himself	Bruce Beresford	Antonio Banderas, Eion Bailey, Alan Arkin, Jim Broadbent	United States	
The Cat in the Hat	Bo Welch	Mike Myers, Alec Baldwin, Dakota Fanning, Spencer Breslin	United States	
El Cid: The Legend	José Pozo		Spain	Animated film
Cold Mountain	Anthony Minghella	Jude Law, Nicole Kidman, Renée Zellweger	United States	
Coronado	Claudio Fäh	Kristin Dattilo, Clayton Rohner, John Rhys-Davies	Germany; United States	
Elf	Jon Favreau	Will Ferrell, James Caan	United States	
Fanfan la Tulipe	Gérard Krawczyk	Vincent Pérez, Penélope Cruz, Didier Bourdon	France	
Fat Pizza	Paul Fenech	Paul Fenech, Paul Nakad, John Boxer, Tahir Bilgiç, Rob Shehadie, Jason Davis	Australia	
Finding Nemo	Andrew Stanton, Lee Unkrich		United States	Animated film, family-oriented adventure, adventure comedy
Japanese Story	Sue Brooks	Toni Collette, Gotaro Tsunashima, Lynette Curran	Australia	
Johnny English	Peter Howitt	Rowan Atkinson, Natalie Imbruglia, Ben Miller, John Malkovich	United Kingdom	
The Jungle Book 2	Steven Trenbirth	Haley Joel Osment (voice), John Goodman (voice), Mae Whitman (voice)	United States	Animated film, family-oriented adventure
Kangaroo Jack	David McNally	Jerry O'Connell, Anthony Anderson, Estella Warren	United States	Adventure comedy
Lara Croft: Tomb Raider – The Cradle of Life	Jan de Bont	Angelina Jolie, Gerard Butler	United States	Fantasy adventure
The Last Samurai	Edward Zwick	Tom Cruise, Ken Watanabe, Tony Goldwyn, Hiroyuki Sanada, Billy Connolly	New Zealand; United States	
The League of Extraordinary Gentlemen	Stephen Norrington	Sean Connery, Shane West, Stuart Townsend	United Kingdom; Germany; Czech Republic; United States	
Looney Tunes: Back in Action	Joe Dante	Brendan Fraser, Jenna Elfman, Steve Martin	United States	Live action/animated film, adventure comedy
The Lord of the Rings: The Return of the King	Peter Jackson	Elijah Wood, Ian McKellen, Viggo Mortensen	United States; New Zealand	Fantasy adventure
Lost Treasure	Jim Wynorski	Stephen Baldwin, Nicollette Sheridan	United States	
Master and Commander: The Far Side of the World	Peter Weir	Russell Crowe, Paul Bettany, Billy Boyd, James D'Arcy	United States	Sea adventure, adventure drama
The Medallion	Gordon Chan	Jackie Chan, Lee Evans, Claire Forlani	Hong Kong; United States	Fantasy adventure
El misterio del Trinidad	José Luis García Agraz	Eduardo Palomo, Rebecca Jones	Mexico; Spain	
National Lampoon's Christmas Vacation 2	Nick Marck	Randy Quaid	United States	Adventure comedy
Once Upon a Time in Mexico	Robert Rodriguez	Antonio Banderas, Salma Hayek, Johnny Depp	United States	
Ong-Bak: Muay Thai Warrior	Prachya Pinkaew	Tony Jaa, Petchtai Wongkamlao, Pumwaree Yodkamol	Thailand	
Peter Pan	P. J. Hogan	Jason Isaacs, Jeremy Sumpter, Rachel Hurd-Wood	United States; United Kingdom; Australia	Fantasy adventure
Pirates of the Caribbean: The Curse of the Black Pearl	Gore Verbinski	Johnny Depp, Geoffrey Rush, Orlando Bloom, Keira Knightley, Jack Davenport	United States	Pirate film
Rencontre avec le dragon	Hélène Angel	Daniel Auteuil, Nicolas Nollet, Sergi López, Emmanuelle Devos, Gilbert Melki	France	
The Rundown	Peter Berg	Dwayne Johnson, Rosario Dawson, Christopher Walken	United States	Adventure comedy
Shanghai Knights	David Dobkin	Jackie Chan, Owen Wilson	United States; Hong Kong	
Le silence de la forêt	Bassek Ba Kobhio, Didier Ouénangaré	Eriq Ebouaney, Nadège Beausson-Diagne	Cameroon; Central African Republic; Gabon; France	
Sinbad: Legend of the Seven Seas	Tim Johnson, Patrick Gilmore		United States	Animated film, fantasy adventure, sea adventure
Sky Captain and the World of Tomorrow	Kerry Conran	Gwyneth Paltrow, Jude Law, Angelina Jolie	United States	
The Snow Walker	Charles Martin Smith	Barry Pepper, Annabella Piugattuk	Canada	
Spy Kids 3-D: Game Over	Robert Rodriguez	Antonio Banderas, Carla Gugino, Alexa Vega	United States	Family-oriented adventure film
Sword in the Moon	Kim Ui-seok	Cho Jae-hyun, Choi Min-soo, Kim Bo-kyung	South Korea	
Timeline	Richard Donner	Paul Walker, Frances O'Connor, Gerard Butler, Lambert Wilson	United States	
Tokyo Godfathers	Satoshi Kon, Shôgo Furuya	Tôru Emori (voice), Yoshiaki Umegaki (voice), Aya Okamoto (voice), Shôzô Îzuka (voice)	Japan	Animated film
Travellers and Magicians	Khyentse Norbu	Tsewang Dandup, Sonam Lhamo, Lhakpa Dorji	Bhutan	
Zurdo	Carlos Salces	Alex Perea, Alejandro Camacho, Arcelia Ramirez	Mexico	Family-oriented adventure

== 2004 ==
Title	Director	Cast	Country	Subgenre/Notes
Alexander	Oliver Stone	Colin Farrell, Angelina Jolie, Val Kilmer, Rosario Dawson, Anthony Hopkins	Germany; Italy; France; Netherlands; United Kingdom; United States	
Anacondas: The Hunt for the Blood Orchid	Dwight H. Little	Johnny Messner, KaDee Strickland	United States	
Around the World in 80 Days	Frank Coraci	Jackie Chan, Steve Coogan, Cécile de France	United States; Germany; United Kingdom; Ireland	
Arsène Lupin	Jean-Paul Salomé	Romain Duris, Kristin Scott Thomas, Pascal Greggory	Spain; Italy; France; United Kingdom	Romantic adventure
Balto III: Wings of Change	Phil Weinstein		United States	Animated film, family-oriented adventure
The Bourne Supremacy	Paul Greengrass	Matt Damon	United States	
Catch That Kid	Bart Freundlich	Kristen Stewart, Corbin Bleu, Max Thieriot	United States	Family-oriented adventure
The Chronicles of Riddick	David N. Twohy	Vin Diesel, Colm Feore, Thandiwe Newton, Judi Dench, Karl Urban	United States	Space adventure
Dark Kingdom: The Dragon King	Uli Edel	Kristanna Loken, Benno Fürmann, Alicia Witt	Germany	Fantasy adventure
EuroTrip	Jeff Schaffer	Scott Mechlowicz, Jacob Pitts, Travis Wester, Michelle Trachtenberg	United States; Czech Republic	Adventure comedy
La Femme Musketeer	Steve Boyum	Susie Amy, Michael York, Gérard Depardieu, Nastassja Kinski, John Rhys-Davies, Christopher Cazenove	United States	
Flight of the Phoenix	John Moore	Dennis Quaid, Tyrese Gibson, Giovanni Ribisi, Miranda Otto, Tony Curran	United States	Adventure drama
George and the Dragon	Tom Reeve	James Purefoy, Piper Perabo, Patrick Swayze, Michael Clarke Duncan	United States; United Kingdom	Fantasy adventure
Harry Potter and the Prisoner of Azkaban	Alfonso Cuarón	Daniel Radcliffe, Rupert Grint, Emma Watson,	United States	Fantasy adventure
Hidalgo	Joe Johnston	Viggo Mortensen, Omar Sharif, Louise Lombard	United States	
Howl's Moving Castle	Hayao Miyazaki		Japan	Animated film, fantasy adventure
In the Shadow of the Cobra	Ted Nicolaou	Sean Young, James Acheson, Rutger Hauer	United States	
The Incredibles	Brad Bird		United States	Animated film, family-oriented adventure
King Arthur	Antoine Fuqua	Clive Owen, Keira Knightley, Ioan Gruffudd, Mads Mikkelsen, Stellan Skarsgård	United States	
King Solomon's Mines	Steve Boyum	Patrick Swayze, Alison Doody	United States	
The Librarian: Quest for the Spear	David Titcher	Noah Wyle, Sonya Walger, Kyle MacLachlan	United States	
The Life Aquatic with Steve Zissou	Wes Anderson	Bill Murray, Owen Wilson, Cate Blanchett, Anjelica Huston, Willem Dafoe, Jeff Goldblum	United States	Sea adventure
Milady	Josée Dayan	Arielle Dombasle, Asia Argento	France	
National Treasure	Jon Turteltaub	Nicolas Cage, Diane Kruger, Jon Voight, Justin Bartha, Sean Bean, Harvey Keitel	United Kingdom	
The Polar Express	Robert Zemeckis	Tom Hanks (voice)	United States	
Shark Tale	Bibo Bergeron, Vicky Jenson, Rob Letterman	Will Smith (voice), Robert De Niro (voice), Renée Zellweger (voice)	United Kingdom	Animated film, sea adventure
Sky Captain and the World of Tomorrow	Kerry Conran	Gwyneth Paltrow, Jude Law, Angelina Jolie	United States	
The SpongeBob SquarePants Movie	Stephen Hillenburg	Tom Kenny (voice), Bill Fagerbakke (voice), Rodger Bumpass (voice), Clancy Brown (voice), David Hasselhoff	United States	
Team America: World Police	Trey Parker	Trey Parker (voice), Matt Stone (voice), Kristen Miller (voice), Masasa Moyo (voice), Daran Norris (voice)	United States	Marionette film, adventure comedy
Thunderbirds	Jonathan Frakes	Bill Paxton, Anthony Edwards, Sophia Myles, Ben Kingsley	United States	Family-oriented adventure
Troy	Wolfgang Petersen	Brad Pitt, Eric Bana, Diane Kruger, Orlando Bloom, Peter O'Toole, Sean Bean	United States; United Kingdom; Malta	
Wind and Cloud: The Storm Riders	Raymond Lee	Vincent Zhao, Ho Yun Tung	Hong Kong	Fantasy adventure
Without a Paddle	Steven Brill	Seth Green, Matthew Lillard, Dax Shepard, Burt Reynolds	United States	Adventure comedy

== 2005 ==
Title	Director	Cast	Country	Subgenre/Notes
The Adventures of Sharkboy and Lavagirl in 3-D	Robert Rodriguez	Taylor Lautner, Taylor Dooley, Cayden Boyd	United States	Family-oriented adventure
Beauty and the Beast	David Lister	Jane March, William Gregory Lee, Justin Whalin	United Kingdom; South Africa	Fantasy adventure
Beowulf & Grendel	Sturla Gunnarsson	Gerard Butler, Stellan Skarsgård, Sarah Polley	Iceland; United Kingdom; Canada	
The Brothers Grimm	Terry Gilliam	Matt Damon, Heath Ledger, Monica Bellucci, Jonathan Pryce	United States; United Kingdom	Fantasy adventure
Casanova	Lasse Hallström	Heath Ledger, Sienna Miller, Jeremy Irons	United States	
Charlie and the Chocolate Factory	Tim Burton	Johnny Depp, Freddie Highmore	United States; United Kingdom	
Chicken Little	Mark Dindal	Zach Braff (voice), Steve Zahn (voice), Joan Cusack (voice)	United States	Animated film, Family-oriented adventure
The Chronicles of Narnia: The Lion, the Witch and the Wardrobe	Andrew Adamson	Georgie Henley, Skandar Keynes, William Moseley, Anna Popplewell, Tilda Swinton, James McAvoy	United States	Fantasy adventure
The Descent	Neil Marshall	Shauna MacDonald, Natalie Mendoza, Alex Reid, Saskia Mulder	United Kingdom	Adventure drama
Doom	Andrzej Bartkowiak	Dwayne Johnson, Karl Urban, Rosamund Pike	United States	
The Dukes of Hazzard	Jay Chandrasekhar	Johnny Knoxville, Seann William Scott, Jessica Simpson, Willie Nelson, Burt Reynolds	United States	
Duma	Carroll Ballard	Alexander Michaeletos, Eamonn Walker, Campbell Scott, Hope Davis	United States	Family-oriented adventure
End of the Spear	Jim Hanon	Louie Leonardo, Chad Allen, Chase Ellison	United States	Adventure drama
Harry Potter and the Goblet of Fire	Mike Newell	Daniel Radcliffe, Rupert Grint, Emma Watson	United States	Fantasy adventure
The Hitchhikers Guide to the Galaxy	Garth Jennings	Martin Freeman, Sam Rockwell, Mos Def, Zooey Deschanel, Stephen Fry (voice), Alan Rickman (voice)	United States	
The Island	Michael Bay	Ewan McGregor, Scarlett Johansson	United States	
Into the Blue	John Stockwell	Paul Walker, Jessica Alba, Scott Caan	United States	Sea adventure
The Keeper: The Legend of Omar Khayyam	Kayvan Mashayekh	Moritz Bleibtreu, Bruno Lastra, Vanessa Redgrave	United States	Adventure drama
King Kong	Peter Jackson	Naomi Watts, Jack Black, Adrien Brody	United States	
The King Maker	Lek Kitaparaporn	Gary Stretch, John Rhys-Davies, Cindy Burbridge	Thailand; United States	
King of the Lost World	Leigh Scott	Bruce Boxleitner, Steve Railsback	United States	
Kingdom of Heaven	Ridley Scott	Orlando Bloom, Eva Green, Jeremy Irons, Liam Neeson	United Kingdom; United States; Germany	
Kirikou and the Wild Beasts	Michel Ocelot, Bénédicte Galup		France	Family-oriented adventure
Lassie	Charles Sturridge	Peter O'Toole, Samantha Morton, John Lynch	United Kingdom; Ireland; United States; France	Family-oriented adventure
The Legend of Zorro	Martin Campbell	Antonio Banderas, Catherine Zeta-Jones	United States	
Lenny the Wonder Dog	Oren Goldman, Yariv Ozdoba	Sammy Kahn, Craig Ferguson, Michael Winslow	United States	Family-oriented adventure
Love Wrecked	Randal Kleiser	Amanda Bynes, Chris Carmack, Jonathan Bennett	United States	
MirrorMask	Dave McKean	Stephanie Leonidas, Jason Barry, Rob Brydon, Gina McKee	United Kingdom; United States	Fantasy adventure
The Promise	Chen Kaige	Hiroyuki Sanada, Jang Dong-gun, Cecilia Cheung	China	Fantasy adventure
River Queen	Vincent Ward	Samantha Morton, Cliff Morton, Kiefer Sutherland	New Zealand; United Kingdom	
Robots	Chris Wedge, Carlos Saldanha	Ewan McGregor (voice), Halle Berry (voice), Robin Williams (voice)	United States	Animated film, family-oriented adventure
Sahara	Breck Eisner	Matthew McConaughey, Steve Zahn, Penélope Cruz	United States	Romantic adventure
Serenity	Joss Whedon	Nathan Fillion, Gina Torres, Alan Tudyk, Morena Baccarin	United States	Space adventure
A Sound of Thunder	Peter Hyams	Edward Burns, Catherine McCormack, Ben Kingsley	United States; United Kingdom; Germany; Czech Republic	
Star Wars: Episode III – Revenge of the Sith	George Lucas	Hayden Christensen, Ewan McGregor, Samuel L. Jackson, Natalie Portman	United States	
Valiant	Gary Chapman	Ewan McGregor (voice), Ricky Gervais (voice), Tim Curry (voice), Jim Broadbent (voice)	United Kingdom	Animated film, family-oriented adventure
Zathura: A Space Adventure	Jon Favreau	Jonah Bobo, Josh Hutcherson, Dax Shepard	United States	Space adventure

== 2006 ==
Title	Director	Cast	Country	Subgenre/Notes
300	Zack Snyder	Gerard Butler, Lena Headey, David Wenham, Dominic West	United States	
Alatriste	Agustín Díaz Yanes	Viggo Mortensen	Spain	
Apocalypto	Mel Gibson	Rudy Youngblood, Raoul Trujillo	United States	Adventure drama
Asterix and the Vikings	Stefan Fjeldmark, Jesper Møller		Denmark; France	Animated film, adventure comedy, family-oriented adventure
Azur & Asmar: The Princes' Quest	Michel Ocelot		Belgium; Spain; Italy; France	Animated film, family-oriented adventure
Blackbeard	Kevin Connor	Angus Macfadyen, Mark Umbers, Rachel Ward, Jessica Chastain	United States	Sea adventure
Blood Diamond	Edward Zwick	Djimon Hounsou, Leonardo DiCaprio, Jennifer Connelly	United States	Adventure drama
Casino Royale	Martin Campbell	Daniel Craig, Eva Green, Mads Mikkelsen	United Kingdom; United States; Czech Republic; Germany; Italy	
The Curse of King Tut's Tomb	Russell Mulcahy	Casper Van Dien, Malcolm McDowell	United States	
The Da Vinci Code	Ron Howard	Tom Hanks, Angelina Jolie	United States	
Eight Below	Frank Marshall	Paul Walker	United States	Adventure drama
Eragon	Stefen Fangmeier	Ed Speleers, Jeremy Irons, Sienna Guillory, Robert Carlyle, John Malkovich	United States	Fantasy adventure
Flicka	Michael Mayer	Alison Lohman, Tim McGraw, Maria Bello	United States; United Kingdom	
Flushed Away	David Bowers, Sam Fell	Hugh Jackman (voice), Kate Winslet (voice)	United Kingdom; United States	Family-oriented adventure
Flyboys	Tony Bill	James Franco, David Ellison, Jean Reno, Philip Winchester	United States	
The Guardian	Andrew Davis	Kevin Costner, Ashton Kutcher, Sela Ward	United States	Adventure drama
Happy Feet	George Miller		United States; Canada; Australia	Animated film, adventure comedy
Ice Age: The Meltdown	Carlos Saldanha	Ray Romano (voice), John Leguizamo (voice), Denis Leary (voice)	United States	Animated film, family-oriented adventure
Jade Warrior	Antti-Jussi Annila	Tommi Eronen, Markku Peltola, Zhang Jinchu	Finland; Netherlands; Estonia; China	
Kokoda	Alister Grierson	Jack Finsterer	Australia	
Lettres de la mer rouge	Éric Martin, Emmanuel Caussé	Arnaud Giovaninetti	France	
The Librarian: Return to King Solomon's Mines	David Titcher	Noah Wyle, Gabrielle Anwar	United States	
Little Miss Sunshine	Jonathan Dayton, Valerie Faris	Steve Carell, Toni Collette, Greg Kinnear, Abigail Breslin	United States	
The Lost Treasure of the Knights Templar	Kasper Barfoed	Julie Grundtvig Wester, Christian Heldbo Wienberg, Nicklas Svale Andersen	Denmark	
Night at the Museum	Shawn Levy	Ben Stiller, Robin Williams	United States	Adventure comedy, fantasy adventure
Paprika	Satoshi Kon	Megumi Hayashibara (voice), Toru Emori (voice), Katsunosuke Hori (voice)	Japan	Animated film, science fiction adventure
The Pink Panther	Shawn Levy	Steve Buscemi, Kevin Kline	United States	
Pirates of the Caribbean: Dead Man's Chest	Gore Verbinski	Johnny Depp, Orlando Bloom, Keira Knightley, Jack Davenport	United States	Adventure comedy, fantasy adventure
La piste	Éric Valli	Julian Sands	France	Adventure drama
Poseidon	Wolfgang Petersen	Josh Lucas, Kurt Russell, Jacinda Barrett	United States	Sea adventure
Rescue Dawn	Werner Herzog	Christian Bale, Steve Zahn, Jeremy Davies	United States	
Sinking of Japan	Shinji Higuchi	Tsuyoshi Kusanagi, Ko Shibasaki, Etsushi Toyokawa	Japan	
Superman Returns	Bryan Singer	Brandon Routh, Kate Bosworth, Kevin Spacey	United States	
The Thief Lord	Richard Claus	Alice Connor, Aaron Taylor-Johnson, Rollo Weeks, Vanessa Redgrave	Germany; Luxembourg; United Kingdom	
Wolfhound	Nikolai Lebedev	Aleksandr Bukharov, Oksana Akinshina	Russia	Fantasy adventure
X-Men: The Last Stand	Brett Ratner	Hugh Jackman, Halle Berry, Ian McKellen, Famke Janssen, Patrick Stewart	United States	Science-fiction Adventure

== 2007 ==
Title	Director	Cast	Country	Subgenre/Notes
Arn – The Knight Templar	Peter Flinth	Joakim Nätterqvist, Sofia Helin, Stellan Skarsgård, Vincent Pérez	Sweden; Norway; Finland; Denmark	
Aztec Rex	Brian Trenchard-Smith	Ian Ziering, Jack McGee, Dichen Lachman, Marco Sanchez	United States	
Battle for Terra	Aristomenis Tsirbas		United States	Animated film, space adventure
Beowulf	Robert Zemeckis	Ray Winstone (motion capture), Anthony Hopkins (motion capture), Angelina Jolie (motion capture)	United States	Animated film, fantasy adventure
Black Water	David Nerlich, Andrew Traucki	Diana Glenn, Maeve Dermody, Andy Rodoreda	Australia	
Bridge to Terabithia	Gábor Csupó	Josh Hutcherson, AnnaSophia Robb, Robert Patrick	United States	Fantasy adventure
The Bucket List	Rob Reiner	Jack Nicholson, Morgan Freeman, Sean Hayes	United States	
The Nautical Chart	Imanol Uribe	Carmelo Gómez, Aitana Sánchez-Gijón	Spain	
The Darjeeling Limited	Wes Anderson	Owen Wilson, Jason Schwartzman, Adrien Brody	United States	
Diamond Dogs	Shimon Dotan	Dolph Lundgren	Canada; China	
The Golden Compass	Chris Weitz	Nicole Kidman, Dakota Blue Richards, Daniel Craig	United States	Fantasy adventure
Harry Potter and the Order of the Phoenix	David Yates	Daniel Radcliffe, Rupert Grint, Emma Watson	United States	Fantasy adventure
In the Arms of My Enemy	Micha Wald	Adrien Jolivet, Grégoire Colin, François-René Dupont, Grégoire Leprince-Ringuet	Belgium; France	
In the Name of the King: A Dungeon Siege Tale	Uwe Boll	Jason Statham, Leelee Sobieski, Burt Reynolds, Ray Liotta, Ron Perlman, John Rhys-Davies	Canada; United States	
Into the Wild	Sean Penn	Emile Hirsch, Marcia Gay Harden, William Hurt	United States	Adventure drama
Jacquou le Croquant	Laurent Boutonnat	Gaspard Ulliel, Tchéky Karyo, Bojana Panić	France	
Kapitein Rob en het Geheim van Professor Lupardi	Hans Pos	Thijs Römer	Netherlands	
The Last Legion	Doug Lefler	Colin Firth, Ben Kingsley	Italy; United Kingdom; France	
Meet the Robinsons	Stephen Anderson	Daniel Hansen (voice), Jordan Fry (voice), Wesley Singerman (voice), Angela Bassett (voice)	United States	Animated film, science fiction adventure
Mr. Bean's Holiday	Steve Bendelack	Rowan Atkinson, Max Baldry, Willem Dafoe, Jean Rochefort	United Kingdom; France; Germany; United States	
National Treasure: Book of Secrets	Jon Turteltaub	Nicolas Cage, Jon Voight, Diane Kruger, Ed Harris, Helen Mirren, Justin Bartha	United States	
Pathfinder	Marcus Nispel	Karl Urban, Moon Bloodgood, Russell Means, Clancy Brown	United States	Adventure drama
Pirates of the Caribbean: At World's End	Gore Verbinski	Johnny Depp, Geoffrey Rush, Orlando Bloom, Keira Knightley, Chow Yun-fat	United States	
Rogue	Greg McLean	Michael Vartan, Radha Mitchell, Sam Worthington	Australia	
De Scheepsjongens van Bontekoe	Steven de Jong	Pim Wessels, Peter Tuinman, Cees Geel	Netherlands	
The Seeker	David Cunningham	Alexander Ludwig, Christopher Eccleston, Ian McShane	United States	Fantasy adventure
The Simpsons Movie	David Silverman	Dan Castellaneta (voice), Julie Kavner (voice), Nancy Cartwright (voice), Yeardley Smith (voice), Hank Azaria (voice), Harry Shearer (voice)	United States	Animated film
Stardust	Matthew Vaughn	Claire Danes, Michelle Pfeiffer, Robert De Niro	United States	Fantasy adventure
Sunshine	Danny Boyle	Cillian Murphy, Chris Evans, Rose Byrne	United States; United Kingdom	Space adventure
Wild Hogs	Walt Becker	Tim Allen, John Travolta, Martin Lawrence, William H. Macy	United States	

== 2008 ==
Title	Director	Cast	Country	Subgenre/Notes
10,000 BC	Roland Emmerich	Steven Strait, Camilla Belle, Affif Ben Badra, Tim Barlow	United States	
Allan Quatermain and the Temple of Skulls	Mark Atkins	Sean Cameron Michael	United States	
Arn – The Kingdom at Road's End	Peter Flinth	Joakim Nätterqvist, Sofia Helin, Stellan Skarsgård	Sweden; Norway; Finland; Denmark	
Asterix at the Olympic Games	Thomas Langmann, Frédéric Forestier	Clovis Cornillac, Gérard Depardieu, Alain Delon	Belgium; Spain; Italy; Germany; France	Family-oriented adventure
Australia	Baz Luhrmann	Nicole Kidman, Hugh Jackman, David Wenham	United States	
Beverly Hills Chihuahua	Raja Gosnell	Jamie Lee Curtis, Piper Perabo, Manolo Cardona	United States	Adventure comedy
Bolt	Chris Williams, Byron Howard		United States	Animated film, adventure comedy
De Brief voor de Koning	Pieter Verhoeff	Yannick van de Velde, Quinten Schram, Hanna Schwamborn	Netherlands	Fantasy adventure
The Children of Huang Shi	Roger Spottiswoode	Jonathan Rhys Meyers, Radha Mitchell, Chow Yun-fat	United States; China; Australia; Germany	Adventure drama
The Chronicles of Narnia: Prince Caspian	Andrew Adamson	William Moseley, Anna Popplewell, Skandar Keynes	United States; New Zealand	Fantasy adventure
City of Ember	Gil Kenan	Saoirse Ronan, Harry Treadaway, Bill Murray	United States	Fantasy adventure
Dachimawa Lee	Ryoo Seung-wan	Im Won-hee, Gong Hyo-jin, Park Si-yeon	South Korea	
Female Agents	Jean-Paul Salomé	Sophie Marceau, Julie Depardieu, Marie Gillain	France	War adventure
The Flyboys	Rocco DeVilliers	Jesse James, Reiley McClendon, Stephen Baldwin	United States	
Fool's Gold	Andy Tennant	Matthew McConaughey, Kate Hudson, Donald Sutherland	United States	Adventure comedy, romantic adventure
The Forbidden Kingdom	Rob Minkoff	Jackie Chan, Jet Li, Collin Chou	United States	Fantasy adventure
The Good, the Bad, the Weird	Kim Jee-Woon	Song Kang-ho, Lee Byung-hun, Jung Woo-sung	South Korea	Action-adventure
Indiana Jones and the Kingdom of the Crystal Skull	Steven Spielberg	Harrison Ford, Cate Blanchett, Karen Allen, Shia LaBeouf	United States	Adventure comedy
Inkheart	Iain Softley	Brendan Fraser, Eliza Bennett, Paul Bettany, Helen Mirren, Andy Serkis, Jim Broadbent, Sienna Guillory	United States; United Kingdom; Germany	
Die Jagd nach dem Schatz der Nibelungen	Ralf Huettner	Benjamin Sadler, Bettina Zimmermann, Fabian Busch, Hark Bohm	Germany	
La Jeune Fille et les Loups	Gilles Legrand	Laetitia Casta, Stefano Accorsi, Jean-Paul Rouve, Michel Galabru	France	
Journey to the Center of the Earth	Eric Brevig	Brendan Fraser, Josh Hutcherson, Anita Briem	United States	Fantasy adventure
Jumper	Doug Liman	Hayden Christensen, Jamie Bell, Samuel L. Jackson	United States	Science fiction adventure
The Librarian: Curse of the Judas Chalice	Jonathan Frakes	Noah Wyle, Stana Katic	United States	
The Lost Treasure of the Grand Canyon	Farhad Mann	Michael Shanks, Shannen Doherty, J. R. Bourne	United States	
Merlin and the War of the Dragons	Mark Atkins	Simon Lloyd-Roberts, Jürgen Prochnow	United States	Fantasy adventure
The Mummy: Tomb of the Dragon Emperor	Rob Cohen	Brendan Fraser, Jet Li, Michelle Yeoh	United States	Fantasy adventure, adventure comedy
Nim's Island	Mark Levin	Abigail Breslin, Jodie Foster, Gerard Butler	United States; Australia	Family-oriented adventure
North Face	Philipp Stölzl	Benno Fürmann, Florian Lukas, Johanna Wokalek	Germany; Austria	Adventure drama
Outlander	Howard McCain	Jim Caviezel, John Hurt, Ron Perlman	United States	Science fiction adventure
Quantum of Solace	Marc Forster	Daniel Craig, Olga Kurylenko, Mathieu Amalric, Gemma Arterton	United Kingdom; United States	
Rambo	Sylvester Stallone	Sylvester Stallone, Julie Benz, Paul Schulze	United States	War adventure
The Red Baron	Nikolai Müllerschön	Matthias Schweighöfer, Lena Headey, Til Schweiger, Joseph Fiennes	Germany	War adventure
Red Cliff	John Woo	Tony Leung Chiu-Wai, Takeshi Kaneshiro, Zhang Fengyi	China	
Roadside Romeo	Jugal Hansraj		India; United States	Animated film, family-oriented adventure
The Scorpion King 2: Rise of a Warrior	Russell Mulcahy	Michael Copon, Randy Couture, Karen Shenaz David	United States	Fantasy adventure
Star Wars: The Clone Wars	Dave Filoni	Matt Lanter (voice), James Arnold Taylor (voice), Dee Bradley Baker (voice), Tom Kane (voice)	United States	Animated film, space adventure
Strange Wilderness	Fred Wolf	Steve Zahn, Allen Covert, Jonah Hill, Kevin Heffernan	United States	Adventure comedy
The Tale of Despereaux	Sam Fell, Robert Stevenhagen		United States; United Kingdom	Animated film
A Viking Saga	Michael Mouyal	Ken Vedsegaard	Denmark	
WALL-E	Andrew Stanton		United States	Science fiction adventure

== 2009 ==
Title	Director	Cast	Country	Subgenre/Notes
9	Shane Acker	Elijah Wood (voice)	United States	Animated film, science fiction adventure, fantasy adventure
12 Paces Without a Head	Sven Taddicken	Ronald Zehrfeld, Matthias Schweighöfer	Germany	
2012	Roland Emmerich	John Cusack, Chiwetel Ejiofor, Amanda Peet, Oliver Platt	United States; Canada	
Agora	Alejandro Amenábar	Rachel Weisz, Max Minghella, Oscar Isaac	Spain	
Avatar	James Cameron	Sam Worthington, Zoe Saldaña	United States	
Barbarossa	Renzo Martinelli	Rutger Hauer, Raz Degan, F. Murray Abraham, Ángela Molina	Italy	
Dragonball Evolution	James Wong	Justin Chatwin, James Marsters, Emmy Rossum	Australia; United Kingdom; Hong Kong; United States	Fantasy adventure
Envoyés très spéciaux	Frédéric Auburtin	Gérard Lanvin, Gérard Jugnot, Omar Sy	France	Adventure comedy
Fräulein Stinnes fährt um die Welt	Erica von Moeller	Sandra Hüller, Bjarne Henriksen	Germany	
Haeundae	Yoon Je-kyoon	Sul Kyung-gu, Ha Ji-won, Lee Min-ki	South Korea	
Harry Potter and the Half-Blood Prince	David Yates	Daniel Radcliffe, Rupert Grint, Emma Watson	United Kingdom; United States	Fantasy adventure
Ice Age: Dawn of the Dinosaurs	Carlos Saldanha	Ray Romano, John Leguizamo, Denis Leary	United States	animated film, family oriented
The Imaginarium of Doctor Parnassus	Terry Gilliam	Heath Ledger, Christopher Plummer, Tom Waits	Canada; United Kingdom	Fantasy adventure
Inglourious Basterds	Quentin Tarantino	Brad Pitt, Mélanie Laurent, Christoph Waltz	Germany; United States	War adventure
Into the Blue 2: The Reef	Stephen Herek	Chris Carmack, Laura Vandervoort	United States	
Janosik: A True Story	Kasia Adamik, Agnieszka Holland	Václav Jiráček	Czech Republic; Slovakia; Poland; Hungary	
Land of the Lost	Brad Silberling	Will Ferrell, Anna Friel, Danny McBride	United States	Science fiction adventure
The Last Flight	Karim Dridi	Marion Cotillard, Guillaume Canet	France	
Night at the Museum: Battle of the Smithsonian	Shawn Levy	Ben Stiller, Amy Adams, Robin Williams, Owen Wilson, Hank Azaria	United States	Adventure comedy, fantasy adventure
OSS 117: Lost in Rio	Michel Hazanavicius	Jean Dujardin, Louise Monot, Michel Aumont	France	Adventure comedy
The Princess and the Frog	John Musker, Ron Clements	Anika Noni Rose, Bruno Campos, Keith David	United States	Animated film
Race to Witch Mountain	Andy Fickman	Dwayne Johnson, AnnaSophia Robb, Ciarán Hinds, Carla Gugino, Alexander Ludwig	United States	Family-oriented adventure, science fiction adventure
Safari	Olivier Baroux	Kad Merad, Lionel Abelanski, Valerie Benguigui	France	Adventure comedy
Sherlock Holmes	Guy Ritchie	Robert Downey Jr., Jude Law, Rachel McAdams, Mark Strong	United Kingdom; United States	
Sin Nombre	Cary Joji Fukunaga	Paulina Gaitan, Edgar Flores	Mexico; United States	Adventure drama
Solomon Kane	Michael J. Bassett	James Purefoy, Max von Sydow, Rachel Hurd-Wood	United Kingdom; France; Czech Republic	
Star Trek	J. J. Abrams	Chris Pine, Zachary Quinto, Leonard Nimoy	United States	Space adventure
Transformers: Revenge of the Fallen	Michael Bay	Shia LaBeouf, Megan Fox	United States	
Up	Pete Docter	Edward Asner (voice), Christopher Plummer (voice), Jordan Nagai (voice), Bob Peterson (voice)	United States	Animated film, family-oriented adventure
Valhalla Rising	Nicolas Winding Refn	Mads Mikkelsen, Maarten Stevenson, Gordon Brown	United States; United Kingdom; Denmark	Adventure drama
Van Diemen's Land	Jonathan Auf Der Heide	Oscar Redding, Greg Stone, Arthur Angel, Paul Ashcroft, Mark Leonard Winter	Australia	
Vicky the Viking	Michael Herbig	Jonas Hämmerle, Waldemar Kobus, Günther Kaufmann	Germany	
