= List of animated feature films of 2002 =

This is a list of animated feature films first released in 2002.

== List ==
Title	Country	Director	Production company	Animation technique	Type	Notes	Release date	Duration
20,000 Leagues Under The Sea	United States		Metro-Goldwyn-Mayer; DIC Entertainment	Traditional	Direct-to-video		December 29, 2002	74 minutes
6 Angels	Japan	Makoto Kobayashi	Eighty One Entertainment; Jpec Syst Co., Ltd.	Traditional	Theatrical		July 6, 2002	100 minutes
The Adventures of Tom Thumb & Thumbelina	United States	Glenn Chaika	Hyperion Animation; Miramax Films	Traditional	Direct-to-video		August 6, 2002	74 minutes
Alibaba	India	Usha Ganesarajah	Pentamedia Graphics	Computer	Direct-to-video		July 26, 2002	79 minutes
The Amazing Zorro	United States	Scott Heming	DIC Entertainment	Traditional	Television film		December 22, 2002	72 minutes
Go! Anpanman: The Secret of Roll and Roura's Floating Castle それいけ!アンパンマン ロールとローラ うきぐも城のひみつ	Japan	Shunji Oga	Anpanman Production Committee; TMS Entertainment	Traditional			July 13, 2002	50 minutes
Anjé: The Legend of the Pyrenees; Anjé, La leyenda del pirineo	Spain	Juan José Elordi Bilbao	Baleuko S.L.	Computer	Theatrical		December 5, 2002	72 minutes
The Archies in JugMan	United States	Scott Heming	DIC Entertainment	Traditional	Television film		November 3, 2002	74 minutes
Báječná show	Czech Republic	Vladimír Mráz		Stop motion	Theatrical		April 27, 2002	73 minutes
Balto: Wolf Quest	United States	Phil Weinstein	Universal Cartoon Studios	Traditional	Direct-to-video		February 19, 2002	75 minutes
Barbie as Rapunzel	United States	Owen Hurley	Mainframe Entertainment; Mattel Entertainment	Computer	Direct-to-video		October 1, 2002	83 minutes
Beyblade: Fierce Battle	Japan			Traditional	Theatrical		August 17, 2002	70 minutes
Birdvillage: Second Nest	United States	Scott Cawthon	Cawthon Entertainment	Computer	Direct-to-video	Partially found animation	2002	Unknown
Blue Gender: The Warrior	Japan	Koichi Ohata	AIC	Traditional	Theatrical		November 20, 2002	95 minutes
The Boy Who Wanted to Be a Bear; Drengen Der Ville Gøre Det Umulige	Denmark; France	Jannik Hastrup		Traditional	Theatrical		December 18, 2002	75 minutes
Case Closed: The Phantom of Baker Street 名探偵コナン ベイカー街の亡霊 (Meitantei Conan Beikā Sutorīto no Bōrei)	Japan	Kenji Kodama	TMS Entertainment	Traditional	Theatrical		April 20, 2002	107 minutes
The Cat Returns 猫の恩返し; Neko no Ongaeshi	Japan	Hiroyuki Morita	Studio Ghibli	Traditional	Theatrical		July 20, 2002	75 minutes
Cinderella II: Dreams Come True	United States	John Kafka	Walt Disney Television Animation	Traditional	Direct-to-video		February 26, 2002	73 minutes
Corto Maltese: La cour secrète des Arcanes	France; Italy; Luxembourg			Traditional	Theatrical		September 25, 2002	92 minutes
Crayon Shin-chan: The Storm Called: The Battle of the Warring States	Japan	Keiichi Hara	Shin-Ei Animation	Traditional	Theatrical		April 20, 2002	95 minutes
Dennis the Menace: Cruise Control	United States	Patrick A. Ventura	DIC Entertainment	Traditional	Television film		October 27, 2002	73 minutes
Dinosaur Island	United States	Will Meugniot	DIC Entertainment	Traditional	Direct-to-video		November 10, 2002	80 minutes (United States); 74 minutes (Australia)
Doraemon: Nobita in the Robot Kingdom ドラえもん のび太とロボット王国; Doraemon Nobita to Robotto Kingudamu	Japan	Tsutomu Shibayama	Shin-Ei Animation	Traditional	Theatrical		March 9, 2002	80 minutes
Dragon Hill; Dragon Hill, la colina del dragon	Spain	Ángel Izquierdo	Milímetros	Traditional	Theatrical		December 20, 2002	80 minutes
Eden	Poland	Andrzej Czeczot		Traditional	Theatrical		September 20, 2002 (Gdynia Polish Film Festival); February 28, 2003 (Poland)	85 minutes
Eight Crazy Nights	United States	Seth Kearsley	Columbia Pictures; Happy Madison Productions; Meatball Animation Studio	Traditional	Theatrical		November 27, 2002	76 minutes
Fimfárum; Fimfárum Jana Wericha	Czech Republic	Aurel Klimt; Vlasta Pospíšilová	Krátký film Praha	Stop motion	Theatrical		May 27, 2002 (Zlín Film Festival); November 28, 2002 (Czech)	100 minutes
Globehunters: An Around the World in 80 Days Adventure	United States	John Eng	DIC Entertainment; Frederator Studios; Nickelodeon Productions	Traditional	Television film		December 15, 2002	73 minutes
Groove Squad	United States	Patrick A. Ventura	DIC Entertainment; One Explosion Studios	Traditional	Television film		November 24, 2002	80 minutes
Hamtaro: The Captive Princess	Japan			Traditional	Theatrical		December 14, 2002	55 minutes
Hey Arnold!: The Movie	United States	Tuck Tucker	Nickelodeon Movies; Snee-Oosh, Inc. Nickelodeon Animation Studio	Traditional	Theatrical		June 28, 2002	75 minutes
Holy Fox; Святой лис (Svyatoy lis)	Georgia			Traditional	Theatrical	possibly it is the first Georgian animated feature		52 minutes
The Hunchback of Notre Dame II: The Secret of the Bell	United States	Bradley Raymond	Walt Disney Television Animation	Traditional	Direct-to-video	Final Disney direct-to-video film to use cel animation	March 19, 2002	66 minutes
Ice Age	United States	Chris Wedge	Blue Sky Studios	Computer	Theatrical		March 15, 2002	81 minutes
Initial D: Battle Stage	Japan	Shishi Yamaguchi	Pastel	Traditional	Theatrical		May 15, 2002	40 minutes
Inspector Gadget's Last Case	United States	Michael Maliani	DIC Entertainment	Traditional	Television film		October 6, 2002	73 minutes
InuYasha the Movie: The Castle Beyond the Looking Glass	Japan	Toshiya Shinohara	Sunrise	Traditional	Theatrical		December 21, 2002	99 minutes
Is It College Yet?	United States; South Korea	Glenn Eichler; Susie Lewis Lynn	MTV Studios	Traditional	Television film		January 21, 2002	75 minutes (original) 66 minutes (DVD edit)
Johan Padan and the Discovery of the Americas; Johan Padan a la descoverta de le Americhe	Italy	Giulio Cingoli		Traditional	Theatrical		October 4, 2002	83 minutes
Jonah: A VeggieTales Movie	United States	Phil Vischer; Mike Nawrocki	Big Idea Productions; F·H·E Pictures	Computer	Theatrical		August 14, 2002 (Hollywood Theater); October 4, 2002 (United States)	83 minutes
Karlsson on the Roof; Karlsson på taket	Sweden; Norway	Vibeke Idsøe		Traditional	Theatrical		September 27, 2002	77 minutes
The Little Polar Bear: Lars and the Little Tiger aka Der kleine Eisbär – Lars und der kleine Tiger	Germany	Thilo Rothkirch		Traditional	Theatrical		December 5, 2002	76 minutes
Kwentong kayumanggi	Philippines			Traditional	Theatrical		October 9, 2002	45 minutes
It's a Very Merry Muppet Christmas Movie	United States	Kirk R. Thatcher	The Jim Henson Company	Puppetry / Live action	Television film		November 29, 2002	88 minutes
The Land Before Time IX: Journey to Big Water	United States	Charles Grosvenor	Universal Cartoon Studios	Traditional	Direct-to-video		December 10, 2002	75 minutes
Lilo & Stitch	United States	Chris Sanders; Dean DeBlois	Walt Disney Feature Animation	Traditional	Theatrical		June 14, 2002 (premiere); June 21, 2002 (United States)	85 minutes
Mercano, the Martian; Mercano, el marciano	Argentina	Juan Antin		Traditional / Computer	Theatrical		October 3, 2002	87 minutes
Mickey's House of Villains	United States	Jamie Mitchell; Roberts Gannaway; Tony Craig; Rick Calabash; Mike Moon	Walt Disney Television Animation	Traditional	Direct-to-video		September 3, 2002	68 minutes
Muhammad: The Last Prophet	United States	Richard Rich	RichCrest Animation Studios	Traditional	Theatrical		November 8, 2002 (Turkey); November 14, 2004 (United States)	95 minutes
My Beautiful Girl, Mari 마리이야기 Mariiyagi	South Korea	Lee Sung-gang	Daewoo Entertainment; Kuk Dong; Siz Entertainment	Traditional	Theatrical		January 18, 2002	80 minutes
My Fair Madeline	United States	Scott Heming	DIC Entertainment	Traditional	Television film		November 17, 2002	74 minutes
Ogu and Mampato in Rapa Nui; Ogú y Mampato en Rapa Nui	Chile	Alejandro Rojas	Cine Animadores	Traditional	Theatrical		June 27, 2002	80 minutes
One Piece: Chopper's Kingdom on the Island of Strange Animals	Japan	Junji Shimizu	Toei Animation	Traditional	Theatrical		March 2, 2002	56 minutes
Pokémon Heroes	Japan	Kunihiko Yuyama	OLM, Inc.	Traditional	Theatrical	First Pokémon film to use digital ink and paint	July 13, 2002	72 minutes
The Powerpuff Girls Movie	United States	Craig McCracken	Cartoon Network Studios	Traditional	Theatrical		June 23, 2002 (Century City); July 3, 2002 (United States)	73 minutes
The Princess and the Pea	United States; Hungary	Mark Swan	Feature Films for Families; Pannónia Filmstúdió; Swan Productions	Traditional	Theatrical		August 16, 2002	85 minutes
Peter Pan II: Return to Never Land	United States	Robin Budd; Donovan Cook	Walt Disney Television Animation	Traditional	Theatrical		February 10, 2002 (New York City); February 15, 2002 (United States)	73 minutes
Rolie Polie Olie: The Great Defender of Fun	Canada; France	Ron Pitts; Bill Giggie; Mike Fallows	Nelvana; Sparx*	Computer	Direct-to-DVD		August 12, 2002	75 minutes
Sabrina: Friends Forever	United States	Scott Heming	DIC Entertainment	Traditional	Television film		October 13, 2002	73 minutes
Scooby-Doo	United States	Raja Gosnell	Atlas Entertainment; Mosaic Media Group	Computer / Live action	Theatrical		June 14, 2002	86 minutes
Song of the Miraculous Hind; Ének a csodaszarvasról	Hungary	Marcell Jankovics	Pannónia Filmstúdió	Traditional	Theatrical		February 21, 2002	89 minutes
S.O.S. Planet	United States; Belgium	Ben Stassen	Movida/Trix	Computer	Direct-to-video	IMAX anthology; Documentary	November 2002	40 minutes
Spirit: Stallion of the Cimarron	United States	Kelly Asbury; Lorna Cook	DreamWorks Animation	Traditional	Theatrical		May 24, 2002	83 minutes
Stuart Little 2	United States	Rob Minkoff	Columbia Pictures	Live-action animation			July 19, 2002	78 minutes
Tamala 2010: A Punk Cat in Space	Japan	t.o.L	Kinétique	Traditional	Theatrical		October 19, 2002	92 minutes
Tarzan & Jane	United States	Victor Cook; Steve Loter	Walt Disney Television Animation	Traditional	Direct-to-video		July 23, 2002	75 minutes
Time-Gate; Puerta del tiempo	Spain	Pedro Delgado		Traditional	Theatrical		December 2002	75 minutes
Time Kid	United States	Will Meugniot; Pam Carter	DIC Entertainment	Traditional	Television film		October 20, 2002	73 minutes
Tom and Jerry: The Magic Ring	United States	James Tim Walker	Turner Entertainment Co. Warner Bros. Animation	Traditional	Direct-to-video		November 12, 2001 (United Kingdom); March 12, 2002 (United States)	64 minutes
Treasure Island	United States	Will Meugniot	DIC Entertainment	Traditional	Direct-to-video		December 1, 2002	74 minutes
Treasure Planet	United States	Ron Clements; John Musker	Walt Disney Feature Animation	Traditional	Theatrical		November 27, 2002	95 minutes
A Tree of Palme	Japan	Takashi Nakamura	Palm Studio	Traditional	Theatrical		March 10, 2002	136 minutes
Tristan & Isolde; Tristan et Iseut	France; Luxembourg	Thierry Schiel		Traditional/Computer	Theatrical		April 3, 2002	80 minutes
Turn A Gundam I: Earth Light	Japan	Yoshiyuki Tomino	Sunrise	Traditional	Theatrical		February 9, 2002	129 minutes
Turn A Gundam II: Moonlight Butterfly	Japan	Yoshiyuki Tomino	Sunrise	Traditional	Theatrical		February 10, 2002	127 minutes
Tytus, Romek and A'Tomek Versus the Thieves of Dreams; Tytus, Romek i A’Tomek wśród złodziei marzeń	Poland	Leszek Gałysz		Traditional	Theatrical		March 21, 2002	74 minutes
VeggieTales: The Star of Christmas	United States	Tim Hodge	Big Idea Productions	Computer	Direct-to-video		October 28, 2002	48 minutes
The Wild Thornberrys Movie	United States	Jeff McGrath; Cathy Malkasian	Nickelodeon Movies; Klasky Csupo	Traditional	Theatrical		December 20, 2002	85 minutes
Winnie the Pooh: A Very Merry Pooh Year	United States	Jamie Mitchell	Walt Disney Television Animation	Traditional	Direct-to-video		November 12, 2002	63 minutes
WXIII: Patlabor	Japan	Fumihiko Takayama	Madhouse; Triangle Staff	Traditional	Theatrical		March 30, 2002	94 minutes

== Highest-grossing films ==
The following is a list of the 10 highest-grossing animated feature films first released in 2002.

Rank	Title	Studio	Worldwide gross	Ref.
1	Ice Age	Blue Sky	$383,257,136	
2	Lilo & Stitch	Walt Disney Feature Animation	$273,144,151	
3	Spirit: Stallion of the Cimarron	DreamWorks Animation	$122,563,539	
4	Return to Never Land	DisneyToon	$109,862,682	
5	Treasure Planet	Walt Disney Feature Animation	$109,578,115	
6	The Wild Thornberrys Movie	Nickelodeon Movies / Klasky Csupo	$60,694,737	
7	The Cat Returns	Studio Ghibli	$52,570,526	
8	Jonah: A VeggieTales Movie	Big Idea Productions	$25,615,231	
9	Eight Crazy Nights	Happy Madison Productions / A. Film A/S / Yowza! Animation	$23,833,131	
10	Detective Conan: The Phantom of Baker Street	TMS Entertainment	$23,783,234	

== See also ==
- List of animated television series of 2002
