= List of animated feature films of 2006 =

This is a list of animated feature films first released in 2006.

== List ==
Title	Country	Director	Production company	Animation technique	Type	Notes	Release date	Duration
Aachi & Ssipak 아치와 씨팍	South Korea	Jo Beom-jin	J Team	Traditional			June 28, 2006	90 minutes
The Adventures of Brer Rabbit	United States	Byron Vaughns	Universal Cartoon Studios	Traditional			March 21, 2006	71 minutes
The Adventures of Dragon Fruit 火龍果大冒險	Taiwan	Ivan C. Shih	CGCG Inc	Computer			2006	
Anpanman: Star-Spirited Dollie それいけ!アンパンマン いのちの星のドーリィ	Japan	Hiroyuki Yano	Anpanman Production Committee; TMS Entertainment	Traditional			July 15, 2006	50 minutes
Alexander the Great	Italy	Daehong Kim	Difarm Inc. Mondo TV	Computer			March 10, 2006	80 minutes
Amazing Lives of the Fast Food Grifters 立喰師列伝 (Tachiguishi-Retsuden)	Japan	Mamoru Oshii; Toshihiko Nishikubo	Production I.G.	Traditional			April 8, 2006	104 minutes
Animal Crossing: The Movie 劇場版 どうぶつの森 (Gekijōban Dōbutsu no Mori)	Japan	Jōjin Shimura	OLM, Inc.	Traditional	Theatrical		December 16, 2006	87 minutes
The Ant Bully	United States	John A. Davis	Warner Bros. Pictures; Legendary Pictures; Playtone; DNA Productions	Computer	Theatrical		July 28, 2006	88 minutes
Arthur and the Minimoys; Arthur et les Minimoys	France	Luc Besson	EuropaCorp; Avalanche Productions; Apipoulaï Prod; Canal+	Computer / Live action	Theatrical		November 29, 2006	91 minutes
Asterix and the Vikings; Astérix et les Vikings	France; Denmark	Stefan Fjeldmark; Jesper Møller	Mandarin SAS; 2d3D Animations	Traditional	Theatrical		April 5, 2006 (Belgium); April 12, 2006 (France); June 15, 2007 (United States)	78 minutes
Atagoal: Cat's Magical Forest アタゴオルは猫の森 (Atagoal wa Neko no Mori)	Japan	Mizuho Nishikubo	Kadokawa Herald Pictures	Computer	Theatrical		October 14, 2006	81 minutes
Azur & Asmar: The Princes' Quest; Azur et Asmar	France; Belgium; Spain; Italy	Michel Ocelot	Mac Guff Ligne	Computer	Theatrical		May 21, 2006 (Directors' Fortnight); October 25, 2006 (France)	99 minutes
Bah, Humduck! A Looney Tunes Christmas	United States	Charles Visser	Warner Bros. Animation	Traditional	Direct-to-video		November 14, 2006	46 minutes
Bambi II	United States	Brian Pimental	Disneytoon Studios	Traditional	Direct-to-video	Midquel to Bambi (1942).	January 26, 2006 (Argentina); February 7, 2006	72 minutes
The Barbie Diaries	United States	Eric Fogel; Kallen Kagen	Curios Pictures; Mattel Entertainment	Computer	Direct-to-video		April 30, 2006 (Nickelodeon); May 9, 2006 (DVD)	70 minutes
Barbie in the 12 Dancing Princesses	United States	Greg Richardson	Mainframe Entertainment; Mattel Entertainment	Computer	Direct-to-video		September 10, 2006 (Nickelodeon); September 19, 2006 (DVD)	81 minutes
Barbie: Mermaidia	United States	Walter P. Martishius, William Lau	Mainframe Entertainment; Mattel Entertainment	Computer	Direct-to-video		March 5, 2006 (Nickelodeon); March 14, 2006 (DVD)	70 minutes (Argentina); 75 minutes
Barnyard	United States	Steve Oedekerk	Nickelodeon Movies; O Entertainment	Computer	Traditional		August 4, 2006; October 5, 2006 (Germany)	90 minutes
Bleach: Memories of Nobody 劇場版BLEACH [ブリーチ] MEMORIES OF NOBODY (Gekijōban Bleach: Memories of Nobody)	Japan	Noriyuki Abe	Studio Pierrot; Aniplex	Traditional	Theatrical		December 16, 2006	93 minutes
Blood Tea and Red String	United States	Christiane Cegavske		Stop motion			February 2, 2006	71 minutes
The Blue Elephant ก้านกล้วย (Khan Kluay)	Thailand	Kompin Kemgumnird	Kantana Animation	Computer			May 18, 2006	79 minutes
Bratz Babyz: The Movie	United States	Davis Doi	Deluxe Digital Studios; SD Entertainment; MGA Entertainment	Traditional	Direct-to-video		September 12, 2006	66 minutes
Bratz Genie Magic	United States	Mucci Fassett	Mike Young Productions; MGA Entertainment	Computer	Direct-to-video		April 11, 2006	66 minutes
Bratz: Passion 4 Fashion Diamondz	United States	Mucci Fassett; Nick Rijgersberg	MGA Entertainment	Computer	Direct-to-video		September 26, 2006	59 minutes
Brave Story ブレイブ・ストーリー (Bureibu Stōrī)	Japan	Koichi Chigira	Gonzo	Traditional			July 8, 2006	112 minutes
Brother Bear 2	United States	Ben Gluck	Disneytoon Studios	Traditional	Direct-to-video	Sequel to Brother Bear (2003).	August 29, 2006	73 minutes
Cars	United States	John Lasseter	Pixar Animation Studios	Computer	Theatrical		May 26, 2006 (Lowe's Motor Speedway); June 9, 2006	117 minutes
Casper's Scare School	United States; Australia; India	Mark Gravas	Kapow Pictures; Alligator Planet; Classic Media	Computer	Television film		October 20, 2006	75 minutes
Chika: The Rite of Perdition	United States	Obinna Onwuekwe	Mayhem Production	Flash			July 13, 2006	57 minutes
A Christmas Carol	United Kingdom; Germany	Ric Machin	BKN International; BKN New Media	Computer	Direct-to-video		November 6, 2006 (United States, theatrical); November 20, 2006 (United Kingdom)	(United States)
A Christmas Journey: About the Blessings God Gives	United States	Scott Cawthon	Cawthon Entertainment	Computer	Direct-to-video		October 20, 2006	40 minutes
City of Rott	United States	Frank Sudol		Traditional			August 8, 2006	78 minutes
Codename: Kids Next Door: Operation Z.E.R.O	United States	Tom Warburton	Curious Pictures; Cartoon Network	Traditional	Television film		August 11, 2006	74 minutes
Crayon Shin-chan: The Legend Called: Dance! Amigo! クレヨンしんちゃん 伝説を呼ぶ 踊れ!アミーゴ! (Kureyon Shin Chan: Densetsu wo Yobu: Odore! Amīgo!)	Japan	Yuji Mutoh	Shin-Ei Animation	Traditional	Theatrical		April 15, 2006	96 minutes
Cristobal Coolumbus; Cristobal Molón	Spain	Aitor Arregi; Iñigo Berasategui	Dibulitoon Studio; Irusoin	Computer			November 4, 2006 (San Sebastián Horror and Fantasy Film Festival)	70 minutes
Curious George	United States	Matthew O'Callaghan	Universal Animation Studios; Imagine Entertainment; David Kirschner Productions	Traditional	Theatrical		January 28, 2006 (ArcLight Hollywood); February 10, 2006	87 minutes
Desmond & the Swamp Barbarian Trap; Desmond & Träskpatraskfällan	Sweden	Magnus Carlsson	The Jolly Patron	Stop motion			November 19, 2006	68 minutes
Detective Conan: The Private Eyes' Requiem	Japan	Yasuichiro Yamamoto	TMS Entertainment	Traditional	Theatrical		April 15, 2006	111 minutes
Dieter – The Film; Dieter – Der Film	Germany	Michael Schaack, Toby Genkel	Universum Film	Traditional			March 4, 2006	86 minutes
Dobrynya Nikitich and Zmey Gorynych; Добрыня Никитич и Змей Горыныч (Dobrynya Nikitich i Zmey Gorynych)	Russia	Ilya Maksimov	Melnitsa Animation Studio	Traditional			March 15, 2006	65 minutes
Doogal; Pollux, le manège enchanté The Magic Roundabout	France; United Kingdom; United States	Dave Borthwick; Jean Duval; Frank Passingham	Action Synthese	Computer	Theatrical	Alternate "Americanized" version of The Magic Roundabout (2005).	February 24, 2006	85 minutes 78 minutes (United States); 77 minutes (Ontario, Canada)
Doraemon: Nobita's Dinosaur 2006 映画ドラえもん のび太の恐竜2006 (Gekijōban Doraemon: Nobita no Kyōryū Niimarumaruroku)	Japan	Ayumu Watanabe	Shin-Ei Animation	Traditional	Theatrical		March 4, 2006	107 minutes
Dragons: Destiny of Fire; Dragones: destino de fuego	Peru	Eduardo Schuldt	Alpamayo Entertainment	Computer			July 27, 2006 (Peru); August 11, 2006 (Mexico); March 4, 2007 (Australia); April 8, 2008 (North America)	86 minutes
The Emperor's Secret; Keisarin salaisuus	Finland	Riina Hyytiä	Helsinki Filmi Oy	Computer			September 8, 2006	85 minutes
Especial; Особенный (Osobennyy)	Russia	Kirill Zlotnik	Animagic	Computer			August 2006	75 minutes
Everyone's Hero	Canada; United States	Colin Brady; Christopher Reeve; Daniel St. Pierre	Arc Productions	Computer	Theatrical		September 15, 2006	87 minutes
Felix 2 – The Hare and the Verflixte Time Machine; Felix 2 – Der Hase und die verflixte Zeitmaschine	Germany	Giuseppe Laganà	Caligari Film- und Fernsehproduktions; WunderWerk	Traditional			February 16, 2006	82 minutes
Fimfárum 2	Czech Republic	Vlasta Pospíšilová; Břetislav Pojar; Aurel Klimt; Jan Balej	Ceská Televize, Krátký Film Praha; MAUR Film; Samuelson	Stop motion			February 23, 2006	90 minutes
Flushed Away	United Kingdom; United States	David Bowers; Sam Fell	Aardman Animations; DreamWorks Animation	Computer	Theatrical		November 3, 2006 (United States); December 1, 2006 (United Kingdom)	85 minutes
The Fox and the Hound 2	United States	Jim Kammerud	Walt Disney Studios Home Entertainment; DisneyToon Studios	Traditional	Direct-to-video	Sequel to The Fox and the Hound (1981).	December 12, 2006	69 minutes
Franklin and the Turtle Lake Treasure; Franklin et le trésor du lac	Canada; France	Dominique Monféry	Alphanim; Les Studios DSO; Nelvana; StudioCanal; Europool; LuxAnimation	Traditional			September 6, 2006 (Canada); December 20, 2006 (France)	78 minutes
Free Jimmy; Slipp Jimmy fri	Norway; United Kingdom	Christopher Nielsen	StormStudio	Computer			April 21, 2006 (Norway); October 17, 2008 (United Kingdom)	86 minutes
Garfield: A Tail of Two Kitties	United States	Tim Hill	20th Century Fox; Davis Entertainment Company; Dune Entertainment; Major Studio Partners; Ingenious Film Partners	Computer / Live action	Theatrical		June 16, 2006	77 minutes
Ghost in the Shell: Stand Alone Complex – Solid State Society	Japan	Kenji Kamiyama	Production I.G	Traditional			September 1, 2006	108 minutes
The Girl Who Leapt Through Time 時をかける少女 (Toki o Kakeru Shōjo)	Japan	Mamoru Hosoda	Madhouse	Traditional	Theatrical		July 15, 2006	98 minutes
Happily N'Ever After	Germany; United States	Paul J. Bolger	Berliner Film Companie; Berlin Animation Film; Odyssey Entertainment; Vanguard Animation	Computer	Theatrical		December 16, 2006 (Australia); January 5, 2007 (United States)	87 minutes
Happy Feet	United States; Australia	George Miller; Warren Coleman; Judy Morris	Warner Bros. Pictures; Village Roadshow Pictures; Animal Logic; Kennedy Miller Mitchell; Kingdom Feature Productions	Computer / Live action	Theatrical		November 17, 2006 (United States); December 26, 2006 (Australia)	108 minutes
Hellboy Animated: Sword of Storms	United States	Phil Weinstein; Tad Stones	Film Roman; Revolution Pictures	Traditional			October 28, 2006	77 minutes
Ice Age: The Meltdown	United States	Carlos Saldanha	Blue Sky Studios	Computer	Theatrical	Sequel to Ice Age (2002).	March 31, 2006	91 minutes
Impy's Island; Urmel aus dem Eis	Germany	Reinhard Klooss; Holger Tappe	Ambient Entertainment; Bavaria Pictures	Computer			February 17, 2006 (Germany); September 20, 2006 (United States)	87 minutes
John Paul II: The Friend of All Humanity; Juan Pablo II, el amigo de toda la humanidad	Vatican City; Spain	José Luis López-Guardia	Cavin Cooper Productions	Traditional			October 17, 2006	60 minutes
John Seven Seven; João Sete Sete	Portugal	Carlos Silva; Costa Valente; Vítor Lopes		Traditional			2006	73 minutes
Kittu	India	B. Sathya	Bhargava Pictures	Traditional			July 21, 2006	120 minutes
Kong: Return To The Jungle	United States		BKN	Traditional			2006	81 minutes
Krishna	India	Aman Khan		Computer			September 29, 2006	99 minutes
The Land Before Time XII: The Great Day of the Flyers	United States	Charles Grosvenor	Universal Animation Studios	Traditional	Direct-to-video	Twelfth installment in The Land Before Time film series.	December 6, 2006 (TV); February 27, 2007 (DVD)	81 minutes
The Legend of Sasquatch	United States	Thomas Callicoat	Gorilla Pictures	Computer			September 12, 2006	73 minutes
Leroy & Stitch	United States	Roberts Gannaway; Tony Craig	Walt Disney Television Animation	Traditional	Direct-to-video		June 23, 2006 (TV); June 27, 2006 (DVD)	72 minutes
The Little Bastard and the Old Fart: Death Sucks; Das kleine Arschloch und der alte Sack – Sterben ist Scheiße	Germany	Michael Schaack, Konrad Weise	Senator Film Produktion; TFC Trickompany Filmproduktion	Traditional			October 5, 2006	79 minutes
Live Freaky! Die Freaky!	United States	John Roecker	You've Got Bad Taste Productions; Hellcat Films	Stop motion			January 17, 2006	75 minutes
Livin' It Up With Bratz	United States	Scott Hamilton Kennedy	Donovan Productions; Extra Large Technologies (XLT)	Computer	Direct-to-DVD		August 4, 2006	90 minutes (United States); 82 minutes (extended)
Lotte from Gadgetville; Leiutajateküla Lotte	Estonia; Latvia	Heiki Ernits, Janno Põldma	Eesti Joonisfilm; Rija Films	Traditional	Theatrical		May 23, 2006 (Cannes Film Festival); September 1, 2006 (Estonia)	78 minutes
Lupin III: Seven Days Rhapsody ルパン三世 セブンデイズ・ラプソディ (Rupan Sansei: Sebun Deizu Rapusodi)	Japan	Hajime Kamegaki	TMS Entertainment	Traditional	Television special		September 8, 2006	90 minutes
The Magic Cube; El cubo mágico	Spain	Ángel Izquierdo	M5 Audiovisual; Milimetros Feature Animation	Traditional			December 22, 2006	80 minutes
Manga Latina: Killer on the Loose	Canada; United Kingdom	Henrique Vera-Villanueva	H2V Distribution; Manga Latina Productions	Flash			April 28, 2006 (Providence Latino Film Festival); July 14, 2006 (Puchon International Fantastic Film Festival); August 25, 2006 (Montréal World Film Festival)	75 minutes
Mobile Suit Gundam SEED Destiny: Special Edition I – The Broken World 機動戦士ガンダムSEED スペシャルエディション 虚空の戦場	Japan	Mitsuo Fukuda	Sunrise	Traditional			May 26, 2006	90 minutes
Mobile Suit Gundam SEED Destiny: Special Edition II – Respective Swords 機動戦士ガンダムSEED スペシャルエディション II 遥かなる暁	Japan	Mitsuo Fukuda	Sunrise	Traditional	Theatrical		July 27, 2006	90 minutes
Mobile Suit Gundam SEED Destiny: Special Edition III – Flames Of Destiny 機動戦士ガンダムSEED スペシャルエディション完結編 鳴動の宇宙	Japan	Mitsuo Fukuda	Sunrise	Traditional	Theatrical		October 2, 2006	90 minutes
Mobile Suit Zeta Gundam: A New Translation III – Love is the Pulse of the Stars 機動戦士ZガンダムIII-星の鼓動は愛 (Kidô senshi Z Gandamu III: Hoshi no kodô wa ai)	Japan	Yoshiyuki Tomino	Sunrise	Traditional	Theatrical		March 4, 2006	99 minutes
Monster House	United States	Gil Kenan	Columbia Pictures; Sony Pictures Imageworks; Relativity Media; ImageMovers; Amblin Entertainment	Computer	Theatrical		July 21, 2006	91 minutes
A Movie of Eggs; Una película de huevos	Mexico	Gabriel Riva Palacio Alatriste; Rodolfo Riva Palacio Alatriste	Huevocartoon Producciones	Traditional	Theatrical		April 21, 2006	90 minutes
My Little Pony Crystal Princess: The Runaway Rainbow	United States	John Grusd	SD Entertainment; Hasbro Entertainment	Traditional	Direct-to-video		September 12, 2006	66 minutes
My Little Pony: The Princess Promenade	United States	Vic Dal Chele	SD Entertainment	Traditional	Direct-to-video		February 7, 2006	66 minutes
Naruto the Movie: Guardians of the Crescent Moon Kingdom	Japan	Toshiyuki Tsuru	Aniplex; Studio Pierrot	Traditional	Theatrical		August 5, 2006	95 minutes
Les naufragés de Carthage تحي كرطاقو	Tunisia	Abdelkader Belhadi		Traditional		First Tunisian animated feature.		80 minutes
One Piece: The Giant Mechanical Soldier of Karakuri Castle	Japan	Kōnosuke Uda	Toei Animation	Traditional			March 4, 2006	95 minutes
Open Season	United States	Jill Culton; Roger Allers; Anthony Stacchi	Sony Pictures Animation	Computer	Theatrical		September 25, 2006 (Greek Theatre); September 29, 2006; October 13, 2006 (United Kingdom)	86 minutes
Origin: Spirits of the Past 銀色の髪のアギト (Gin-iro no Kami no Agito)	Japan	Keiichi Sugiyama	Gonzo	Traditional	Theatrical		January 7, 2006	94 minutes
Over the Hedge	United States	Tim Johnson; Karey Kirkpatrick	DreamWorks Animation	Computer	Theatrical		April 30, 2006 (Los Angeles premiere); May 19, 2006 (United States)	83 minutes
Padre Pio	Italy	Orlando Corradi	Mondo TV	Traditional			May 5, 2006	88 minutes
Paprika パプリカ (Papurika)	Japan	Satoshi Kon	Madhouse	Traditional	Theatrical		September 2, 2006 (Venice); November 25, 2006 (Japan)	90 minutes
Patoruzito: The Great Adventure; Patoruzito: La gran aventura	Argentina	José Luis Massa	Patagonik Film Group; Red Lojo Entertainment S.A.	Traditional			June 8, 2006 (Buenos Aires); June 26, 2006 (Argentina)	81 minutes
Piccolo, Saxo and Company; Piccolo, Saxo et Compagnie aka. Piccolo, Saxo et cie	France	Marco Villamizar, Éric Gutierrez	Millimages; Haut et Court	Computer			June 9, 2006 (Annecy International Animation Film Festival); October 29, 2006 (Paris Mon Premier Festival); December 20, 2006	78 minutes 80 minutes (France)
Pokémon: The Mastermind of Mirage Pokémon 戦慄のミラージュポケモン (Senritsu no Mirāju Pokemon)	Japan	Masamitsu Hidaka	OLM, Inc.	Traditional	Television special		April 29, 2006 (United States); October 13, 2006	45 minutes
Pokémon Ranger and the Temple of the Sea 劇場版ポケットモンスターアドバンスジェネレーション ポケモンレンジャーと蒼海の王子 マナフィ (Gekijōban Poketto Monsutā Adobansu Jenerēshon Pokémon Renjā to Umi no Ōji Manafi)	Japan	Kunihiko Yuyama	OLM, Inc.	Traditional	Theatrical		July 15, 2006	107 minutes
Polar Adventures; Элька (Elka)	Russia	Vladimir Sakov	Studio "Tema"	Traditional			December 24, 2006 (International Festival "Detstvo bez granits" and International Film Festival "Skazka"); October 25, 2007	89 minutes 84 minutes (original)
PollyWorld	United States	Bill Moore	Curious Pictures; Mattel Entertainment	Traditional			November 14, 2006	70 minutes
Pretty Cure Splash Star Tic-Tac Crisis Hanging by a Thin Thread!	Japan	Atsuji Shimizu	Toei Animation	Traditional			December 9, 2006	51 minutes
Princess	Denmark; Germany	Anders Morgenthaler	Shotgun Pictures; Zentropa Entertainments	Traditional			June 16, 2006	82 minutes
Prince Vladimir; Князь Владимир (Knyaz Vladimir)	Russia	Yuriy Kulakov	Solnechniy Dom – DM	Traditional			February 23, 2006	78 minutes
Queer Duck: The Movie	United States	Xeth Feinberg	Disgrace Films; Icebox 2.0	Flash	Direct-to-DVD		July 16, 2006	72 minutes
Re-Animated	United States	Bruce Hurwit	Renegade Animation; Turner Studios	Flash / Live action			December 8, 2006	78 minutes
Renaissance	France; United Kingdom; Luxembourg	Christian Volckman	Pathé; Onyx Films; Millimages; LuxAnimation; Timefirm Limited; France 2 Cinéma; Odyssey Entertainment	Computer			March 15, 2006	105 minutes
Robotech: The Shadow Chronicles	United States	Tommy Yune; Dong-Wook Lee; Yeun-Sook Seo (co-director)	Harmony Gold USA; DR Movie; Tatsunoko Production	Traditional			August 25, 2006 (New York); January 5, 2007	88 minutes
Romeo & Juliet: Sealed with a Kiss	United States	Phil Nibbelink	Phil Nibbelink Productions	Traditional / Flash			October 27, 2006	76 minutes
Saint Catherine; Santa Caterina	Italy		Mondo TV; Studio SEK	Traditional			2006	29 minutes
A Scanner Darkly	United States	Richard Linklater	Thousand Words; Section Eight; Detour Filmproduction; 3 Arts Entertainment	Rotoscope			May 25, 2006 (Cannes Film Festival); July 7, 2006 (United States)	100 minutes
Scooby-Doo! Pirates Ahoy!	United States	Chuck Sheetz	Warner Bros. Animation	Traditional	Direct-to-video		September 19, 2006	80 minutes
Shark Bait aka. The Reef aka. Pi's Story 파이 스토리	United States; South Korea	Howard E. Baker, John Fox	WonderWorld Studios; DigiArt; FXDigital	Computer			July 7, 2006 (South Korea); October 9, 2007 (United States); February 9, 2007 (United Kingdom)	77 minutes
Stonewall & Riot: The Ultimate Orgasm	United States	Joe Phillips	Adult Visual Animation	Computer			October 30, 2006	60 minutes
Strawberry Shortcake: The Sweet Dreams Movie	United States	Karen Hyden	DIC Entertainment; American Greetings	Computer	Direct-to-video		October 7, 2006	75 minutes
Superman: Brainiac Attacks	United States	Curt Geda	Warner Bros. Animation	Traditional	Direct-to-video	Non-canon spin-off of Superman: The Animated Series (1996–2000).	June 20, 2006	76 minutes
Tales from Earthsea ゲド戦 (Gedo Senki)	Japan	Gorō Miyazaki	Studio Ghibli	Traditional	Theatrical		July 29, 2006	115 minutes
Teen Titans: Trouble in Tokyo	United States	Michael Chang; Ben Jones; Matt Youngberg	Kadokawa Shoten; DC Comics; Warner Bros. Animation	Traditional			September 15, 2006	75 minutes
Tekkonkinkreet 鉄コン筋クリート (Tekkonkinkurīto)	Japan	Michael Arias	Studio 4°C	Traditional	Theatrical		December 22, 2006	110 minutes
Tom and Jerry: Shiver Me Whiskers	United States	Scott Jeralds	Warner Bros. Animation; Turner Entertainment Co.	Traditional	Direct-to-video		August 22, 2006	74 minutes
Tony Hawk in Boom Boom Sabotage	United States	Johnny Darrell	Mainframe Entertainment	Computer	Direct-to-video		September 12, 2006 (United States); March 12, 2007	70 minutes
The Trip to Panama; Oh, wie schön ist Panama	Germany	Martin Otevrel, Irina Probost	Papa Löwe Filmproduktion Gmbh; Warner Bros. Film Productions Germany; MaBo Filmproduktion; Rothkirch Cartoon Film; GUD Studio; Orange Studio Reklamy	Traditional			September 21, 2006	70 minutes
U	France	Serge Élissalde; Grégoire Solotareff	Prima Linea Productions	Traditional			October 11, 2006	75 minutes
The Ugly Duckling and Me! Den grimme ælling og mig	Denmark; Ireland; Germany; France	Michael Hegner; Karsten Kiilerich	A. Film A/S; Magma Films; TV2 Denmark; Futurikon	Computer	Traditional		September 8, 2006 (TIFF); October 6, 2006 (Denmark); February 14, 2007 (France); February 8, 2008 (United Kingdom); June 23, 2009 (England)	90 minutes
Ultimate Avengers	United States	Curt Geda; Steven E. Gordon; Bob Richardson	Lionsgate Films; MLG Productions; Marvel Studios	Traditional			February 21, 2006	72 minutes 80 minutes (Argentina)
Ultimate Avengers 2	United States	Will Meugniot; Richard Sebast	Marvel Animation	Traditional			July 2, 2006 (Los Angeles Film Festival); August 8, 2006 (United States)	73 minutes
VeggieTales: Gideon: Tuba Warrior	United States	Tim Hodge; Brian Roberts	Big Idea Productions	Computer	Direct-to-video		November 4, 2006	44 minutes
VeggieTales: LarryBoy and the Bad Apple	United States	Tim Hodge	Big Idea Productions	Computer	Direct-to-video		July 29, 2006	45 minutes
VeggieTales: Sheerluck Holmes and the Golden Ruler	United States	Mike Nawrocki	Big Idea Productions	Computer	Direct-to-video		March 11, 2006	52 minutes
The Warrior 黃飛鴻勇闖天下	China	Tsui Hark		Traditional			July 12, 2006	
The Wild	United States; Canada	Steve 'Spaz' Williams	Walt Disney Pictures; Hoytyboy Pictures; Sir Zip Studios; Contrafilm; C.O.R.E. Feature Animation; Nigel Productions	Computer	Theatrical		April 14, 2006	82 minutes
Wood & Stock: Sexo, Orégano e Rock'n'Roll	Brazil	Otto Guerra	Otto Desenhos Animados	Traditional			April 18, 2006	81 minutes

== Highest-grossing films ==
The following is a list of the 11 highest-grossing animated feature films first released in 2006.

Highest-grossing animated films of 2006
Rank	Title	Studio	Worldwide gross	Ref.
1	Ice Age: The Meltdown	20th Century Fox / Blue Sky Studios	$660,940,780	
2	Cars	Walt Disney / Pixar	$462,216,280	
3	Happy Feet	Warner Bros. Pictures / Village Roadshow Pictures/Animal Logic	$384,335,608	
4	Over the Hedge	DreamWorks Animation	$336,002,996	
5	Open Season	Columbia / Sony Pictures Animation	$197,309,027	
6	Flushed Away	DreamWorks Animation / Aardman	$178,281,554	
7	Monster House	Columbia / ImageMovers/ Amblin Entertainment	$140,175,006	
8	Barnyard	Paramount / Nickelodeon Movies / O Entertainment	$116,476,887	
9	The Wild	Disney / C.O.R.E.	$102,338,515	
10	Curious George	Universal Animation Studios / Imagine Entertainment / A. Film A/S	$69,834,815	
11	The Ant Bully	Warner Bros. Pictures / Legendary Pictures / Playtone	$28,142,535	

== See also ==
- List of animated television series of 2006

== Bibliography ==
- Galbraith IV, Stuart (2008). The Toho Studios Story: A History and Complete Filmography. Scarecrow Press. ISBN 978-1461673743.
