= List of animated feature films of 2004 =

This is a list of animated feature films first released in 2004.

== List ==
Title	Country	Director	Production company	Animation technique	Format	Notes	Release date	Duration
Action Man: Robot Atak	United States	John Moffett; Steven Burch; Chris Woods	Arcana Digital	Computer	Direct-to-video		September 24, 2004	45 minutes
Alosha; Алёша Попович и Тугарин Змей (Alyosha Popovich i Tugarin Zmey)	Russia			Traditional	Theatrical		December 23, 2004	79 minutes
Appleseed	Japan	Shinji Aramaki	Digital Frontier	Computer	Theatrical		April 18, 2004	103 minutes
Go! Anpanman: Nyanii of the Country of Dream Cats それいけ!アンパンマン 夢猫の国のニャニイ	Japan	Hiroyuki Yano	Anpanman Production Committee; TMS Entertainment	Traditional			July 17, 2004	51 minutes
Les Aventures extraordinaires de Michel Strogoff	France	Alexandre Huchez, Bruno-René Huchez	Rouge Citron Production; Dargaud Marina	Traditional	Theatrical		June 30, 2004	87 minutes
Balto III: Wings of Change	United States	Phil Weinstein	Universal Animation Studios	Traditional	Direct-to-video	Second and final sequel to Balto (1995).	September 30, 2004	76 minutes
Los balunis en la aventura del fin del mundo	Spain	Juanjo Elordi	Barton Films	Computer	Theatrical		March 24, 2004	79 minutes
Barbie as the Princess and the Pauper	United States	William Lau	Mainframe Entertainment; Mattel Entertainment	Computer	Direct-to-video		September 28, 2004	85 minutes
Bionicle 2: Legends of Metru Nui	United States	Terry Shakespeare; David Molina	Miramax Home Entertainment; The Lego Group; Creative Capers Entertainment; CGCG	Computer	Direct-to-video		October 6, 2004 (El Capitan Theatre); October 19, 2004 (United States)	75 minutes
Blade of the Phantom Master 신암행어사	South Korea	Jōji Shimura; Ahn Tae-kun	Oriental Light and Magic; Character Plan	Computer / Traditional	Theatrical		December 4, 2004	87 minutes
Bob the Builder: Snowed Under: The Bobblesberg Winter Games	United Kingdom; United States	Sarah Ball; Keith Chapman	HIT Entertainment; Hot Animation	Computer	Direct-to-video		January 1, 2004	52 minutes
Boo, Zino & the Snurks; Back to Gaya	Germany; United Kingdom; Spain	Lenard Fritz Krawinkel; Holger Tappe	Ambient Entertainment; Recorded Picture Company; Morena Films	Computer	Direct-to-video		March 18, 2004 (Germany); October 15, 2004 (United Kingdom); September 20, 2005 (United States) (DVD premiere)	91 minutes
Bratz: Starrin' & Stylin'	United States	Sean McNamara	CineGroupe; Toon City Animation	Traditional	Direct-to-video		August 3, 2004	59 minutes
The Butterfly Lovers (Leung juk)	China			Traditional	Theatrical		January 22, 2004	95 minutes
Care Bears: Journey to Joke-a-lot	United States; Canada	Mike Fallows	Nelvana Limited; Sparx Animation Studios; American Greetings	Computer	Direct-to-video		September 8, 2004 (TIFF); October 5, 2004 (United States)	83 minutes
Charley and Mimmo; T'choupi	France; Luxembourg; South Korea	Jean-Luc François	Les Armateurs; RG Prince Films; Mélusine; Téva	Traditional	Theatrical		March 14, 2004 (Alès Film Festival); April 3, 2004 (Paris Film Festival); April 7, 2004 (France)	70 minutes
Circleen: Little Big Mouse; Cirkeline og Verdens mindste superhelt	Denmark			Traditional	Theatrical		December 10, 2004	78 minutes
Clifford's Really Big Movie	United States	Robert C. Ramirez	Scholastic Entertainment; Big Red Dog Productions	Traditional	Theatrical		February 20, 2004	76 minutes
Corto Maltese: La maison dorée de Samarkand	France			Traditional	Theatrical		April 6, 2004	79 minutes
Crayon Shin-chan: The Storm Called: The Kasukabe Boys of the Evening Sun	Japan	Keiichi Hara	Shin-Ei Animation	Traditional	Theatrical		April 17, 2004	96 minutes
Dead Leaves	Japan	Hiroyuki Imaishi	Production I.G	Traditional	Theatrical		January 17, 2004	52 minutes
Derrick – Duty Calls! Derrick – Die Pflicht ruft!	Germany; Ireland			Traditional	Theatrical		April 1, 2004	80 minutes
Detective Conan: Magician of the Silver Sky 名探偵コナン 銀翼の奇術師 (Meitantei Conan Gin-yoku no Majishan)	Japan	Yasuichiro Yamamoto	TMS Entertainment	Traditional	Theatrical		April 17, 2004	108 minutes
The District! Nyócker!	Hungary	Áron Gauder	Lichthof	Computer / Traditional	Theatrical		December 9, 2004	87 minutes
Doraemon: Nobita in the Wan-Nyan Spacetime Odyssey ドラえもん のび太のワンニャン時空伝; Doraemon Nobita no Wan-Nyan Jikūden	Japan	Tsutomu Shibayama	Shin-Ei Animation	Traditional	Theatrical	Final Doraemon film to be a counterpart of the 1979 Doraemon anime and include the original cast.	March 7, 2004	84 minutes
Dragons: Fire and Ice	Canada	Craig Wilson	Mega Bloks Inc. Bardel Entertainment	Computer	Made-for-TV		October 12, 2004	73 minutes
The Easter Egg Adventure	United States	John Michael Williams		Traditional			September 5, 2004 (Jackson Hole Film Festival); February 22, 2005 (DVD premiere)	87 minutes
The Fairly OddParents: Channel Chasers	United States	Butch Hartman	Frederator Studios; Nickelodeon Animation Studio; Paramount Pictures (home video releases)	Traditional	Made-for-TV		July 23, 2004	73 minutes
Fat Albert	United States	Joel Zwick	Davis Entertainment Company; SAH Enterprises	Traditional / Live action	Theatrical		December 25, 2004	87 minutes
Felix the Cat Saves Christmas	United States	Don Oriolo	Felix the Cat Productions Inc.	Traditional	Direct-to-video		October 12, 2004	71 minutes
Frank and Wendy	Estonia	Kaspar Jancis; Ülo Pikkov; Priit Tender		Traditional	Theatrical		December 3, 2004 (Black Nights Film Festival); March 25, 2005 (Estonia)	75 minutes
Fuichin-san フイチンさん	Japan	Yoshitaka Koyama	Animaruya	Traditional	Theatrical		March 20, 2004	61 minutes
G.I. Joe: Valor vs. Venom	United States	Dale Carman	Reel FX Creative Studios; Hasbro	Computer	Direct-to-video		September 14, 2004	77 minutes
Garfield: The Movie	United States	Peter Hewitt	20th Century Fox; Davis Entertainment Company	Computer / Live action	Theatrical		June 11, 2004	80 minutes
Genghis Khan	Italy	Orlando Corradi	Mondo TV	Traditional			2004	100 minutes
Ghost in the Shell 2: Innocence	Japan	Mamoru Oshii	Production I.G	Traditional	Theatrical	Sequel to Ghost in the Shell (1995).	March 6, 2004	98 minutes
Glup, an Adventure Without Waste; Glup, una aventura sin desperdicio	Spain	Aitor Arregi, Iñigo Berasategui		Computer	Theatrical		April 2, 2004	70 minutes
The Great Pig Pirate Mateo 날으는 돼지 해적 마테오	South Korea			Computer	Theatrical		July 24, 2004	90 minutes
Hair High	United States	Bill Plympton	Plymptoons	Traditional	Theatrical		April 17, 2004	78 minutes
Tottoko Hamtaro Ham Ham Paradise! The Movie: Hamtaro and the Demon of the Mysterious Picture Book Tower	Japan	Osamu Dezaki	TMS Entertainment	Traditional	Theatrical		December 23, 2004	40 minutes
Homeland	India			Traditional	Theatrical			
Home on the Range	United States	Will Finn; John Sanford	Walt Disney Feature Animation	Traditional	Theatrical	Last hand drawn animated feature made by Disney until 2009.	April 2, 2004	76 minutes
Howl's Moving Castle ハウルの動く城	Japan	Hayao Miyazaki	Studio Ghibli	Traditional	Theatrical		September 5, 2004 (Venice); November 20, 2004 (Japan)	119 minutes
Immortel	France	Enki Bilal	Duran Entertainment; Quantic Dream	Computer / Live action	Theatrical		March 24, 2004	102 minutes
In Search of Santa	United States	William Kowalchuk	Colorland Animation; Tundra Productions	Computer	Direct-to-video		November 23, 2004	78 minutes
The Incredibles	United States	Brad Bird	Pixar Animation Studios	Computer	Theatrical	Winner of 2004's Best Animated Feature	October 24, 2004 (El Capitan Theatre); November 5, 2004 (United States)	115 minutes
Mickey's Twice Upon a Christmas	United States	Matthew O'Callaghan	Disneytoon Studios	Computer	Direct-to-video	Sequel to Mickey's Once Upon a Christmas (1999), and the first feature film to feature Mickey Mouse and the legacy Disney cartoon characters in computer animation.	November 9, 2004	67 minutes
Inuyasha the Movie: Fire on the Mystic Island 映画犬夜叉 紅蓮の蓬莱島	Japan	Toshiya Shinohara	Sunrise	Traditional	Theatrical		December 23, 2004	88 minutes
The Island of Black Mor; L'Île de Black Mór	France	Jean-François Laguionie		Traditional	Theatrical		February 11, 2004	85 minutes
The Jimmy Timmy Power Hour	United States	Keith Alcorn; Butch Hartman	O Entertainment; DNA Productions; Frederator Incorporated; Nickelodeon Animation Studio	Traditional / Computer	Television special	First installment in a trilogy of crossover specials between The Adventures of Jimmy Neutron, Boy Genius and The Fairly OddParents.	May 7, 2004	50 minutes
Kangaroo Jack: G'Day U.S.A.!	United States	Emory Myrick; Jeffrey Gatrall	Castle Rock Entertainment; Warner Bros. Animation	Traditional	Direct-to-video	Animated spin-off/sequel to Kangaroo Jack (2003).	November 16, 2004	77 minutes
Kate - the Taming of the Shrew	Italy	Roberto Lione	Lanta srl Crayons Pictures Srl; The Taming of The Shrew LLC	Stop-motion	Theatrical		April 23, 2004	77 minutes
The Little Polar Bear: A Visitor from the South Pole; Der kleine Eisbär - Besuch vom Südpol	Germany	Thilo Rothkirch		Traditional	Theatrical		November 5, 2004	71 minutes
Lady Death: The Motion Picture	United States	Andy Orjuela	A.D. Vision	Traditional	Direct-to-video		July 24, 2004	80 minutes
Laura's Star; Lauras Stern	Germany; Bulgaria	Piet De Rycker; Thilo Rothkirch	Rothkirch Cartoon-Film; Warner Bros. Film Productions Germany; MABO Pictures Filmproduktion; Comet Film	Traditional	Theatrical		September 26, 2004	80 minutes
The Legend of Buddha	India	Shamboo Falke	Pentamedia Graphics	Traditional	Theatrical		October 22, 2004	90 minutes
The Lion King 1½; The Lion King 3: Hakuna Matata	United States	Bradley Raymond	Disneytoon Studios	Traditional	Direct-to-video	Third installment in The Lion King trilogy, serves as both sequel and sidequel to the original film.	February 10, 2004	76 minutes
Lupin III: Stolen Lupin ルパン三世 盗まれたルパン 〜コピーキャットは真夏の蝶〜 (Rupan Sansei: Nusumareta Rupan ~Copī Kyatto wa Manatsu no Chō~)	Japan	Hidehito Ueda	Tokyo Movie Shinsha	Traditional	Television special		July 30, 2004	97 minutes
Max Steel: Endangered Species	United States	Sean Frewer	Mainframe Entertainment; Mattel Entertainment (distributor)	Computer	Direct-to-video		July 17, 2004 (Mexico)	71 minutes
McDull, prince de la bun	Hong Kong	Toe Yuen	Bliss Pictures; Lunchtime Production	Traditional	Theatrical		June 24, 2004	78 minutes
Mickey, Donald, Goofy: The Three Musketeers	United States	Donovan Cook	Disneytoon Studios	Traditional	Direct-to-video		August 17, 2004	65 minutes
Mind Game	Japan	Masaaki Yuasa	Studio 4°C	Traditional	Theatrical		August 7, 2004	103 minutes
Mobile Suit Gundam SEED: Special Edition I – The Empty Battlefield	Japan	Mitsuo Fukuda	Sunrise	Traditional	Theatrical		August 27, 2004	100 minutes
Mobile Suit Gundam SEED: Special Edition II – The Far-Away Dawn	Japan	Mitsuo Fukuda	Sunrise	Traditional	Theatrical		September 24, 2004	100 minutes
Mobile Suit Gundam SEED: Special Edition III – The Rumbling Sky	Japan	Mitsuo Fukuda	Sunrise	Traditional	Theatrical		October 22, 2004	100 minutes
MovieComic: The Movie; Cine Gibi: O Filme	Brazil	José Márcio Nicolosi	Maurício de Sousa Produções	Traditional / Live action	Theatrical		July 9, 2004	71 minutes
¡Mucha Lucha!: The Return of El Maléfico	United States	Ron Hughart	Warner Home Video; Warner Bros. Animation	Flash animation	Direct-to-video		July 25, 2004 (San Diego Comic-Con); October 5, 2004 (United States)	70 minutes
Muhammad: The Last Prophet	United States	Richard Rich	RichCrest Animation Studios	Traditional	Theatrical		November 8, 2002 (Turkey); November 14, 2004 (United States)	95 minutes
Mulan II	United States	Darrell Rooney; Lynne Southerland	Disneytoon Studios	Traditional	Direct-to-video	Sequel to Mulan (1998); last Disneytoon Studios direct-to-video film animated by Walt Disney Animation Japan.	December 28, 2004	79 minutes
My Scene: Jammin' in Jamaica	United States	Eric Fogel	Curious Pictures	Traditional	Direct-to-video		May 15, 2004	44 minutes
Naruto the Movie: Ninja Clash in the Land of Snow 劇場版 NARUTO -ナルト- 大活劇!雪姫忍法帖だってばよ!! (Gekijō-ban Naruto: Daikatsugeki! Yukihime Ninpōchō Dattebayo!!)	Japan	Tensai Okamura	Studio Pierrot	Traditional	Theatrical	First installment of the Naruto film series.	August 21, 2004	82 minutes
Neznayka and the Barrabass; Незнайка и Баррабасс (Neznayka i Barrabass)	Russia			Traditional	Theatrical		October 28, 2004	80 minutes
Nine Dog Christmas	United States	Ka Moon Song		Traditional	Direct-to-video		October 5, 2004	59 minutes
Noah's Ark: Story of the Biblical Flood	United States	Scott Cawthon	Cawthon Entertainment	Computer	Direct-to-video		December 1, 2004	52 minutes
The Nutcracker and the Mouseking; Щелкунчик	Russia; Germany; United States; United Kingdom	Tatjana Ilyina; Michael Johnson		Traditional	Theatrical		October 12, 2004	82 minutes
One Piece: The Cursed Holy Sword	Japan	Kazuhisa Takenouchi	Toei Animation	Traditional	Theatrical		March 6, 2004	95 minutes
Party Wagon	United States	Craig Bartlett	Snee-Oosh, Inc. Cartoon Network Studios	Traditional	Television special		February 27, 2004	70 minutes
Patoruzito	Argentina	José Luis Massa		Traditional	Theatrical		July 8, 2004	75 minutes
Pinocchio 3000	Spain; France; Canada	Daniel Robichaud	CinéGroupe; AnimaKids Productions; Filmax Animation; Castelao Productions, S.A; Bren Entertainment, S.A; Canal+ France 2 Cinéma	Computer	Theatrical		February 9, 2004	79 minutes
The Place Promised in Our Early Days 雲のむこう、約束の場所 (Kumo no Mukō, Yakusoku no Basho)	Japan	Makoto Shinkai	CoMix Wave Inc.	Traditional	Theatrical		November 20, 2004	90 minutes
Pokémon: Destiny Deoxys 劇場版ポケットモンスター アドバンスジェネレーション 裂空の訪問者 デオキシス (Gekijōban Poketto Monsutā Adobansu Jenerēshon Rekkū no Hōmonsha Deokishisu)	Japan	Kunihiko Yuyama	OLM, Inc.	Traditional	Theatrical		July 17, 2004	100 minutes
The Polar Express	United States	Robert Zemeckis	Castle Rock Entertainment; Shangri-La Entertainment; Playtone; ImageMovers; Golden Mean Productions	Computer	Theatrical		October 13, 2004 (Chicago International Film Festival); November 10, 2004 (United States)	100 minutes
Popeye's Voyage: The Quest for Pappy	Canada; United States	Ezekiel Norton	King Features Entertainment; Mainframe Entertainment; Nuance Productions	Computer	Direct-to-video		November 9, 2004	47 minutes
Pororo to the Cookie Castle 뽀로로의 대모험 (Pororo's Great Adventure)	Korea	Kim Hyun-Ho		Computer	Theatrical	First feature film installment in the Pororo the Little Penguin franchise.	December 11, 2004	71 minutes
Saint Seiya: Heaven Chapter – Overture 聖闘士星矢 天界編 序奏〜overture〜 (Seinto Seiya Tenkai-hen: Josō Overture)	Japan	Shigeyasu Yamauchi	Toei Animation	Traditional	Theatrical	Fifth installment in the Saint Seiya film series and the first in fifteen years.	February 14, 2004	84 minutes 83 minutes (Japan)
Scooby-Doo! and the Loch Ness Monster	United States	Scott Jeralds; Joe Sichta	Warner Bros. Animation	Traditional	Direct-to-video		June 22, 2004	74 minutes
Scooby-Doo 2: Monsters Unleashed	United States	Raja Gosnell	Mosaic Media Group; Atlas Entertainment	Computer / Live action	Theatrical		March 26, 2004	92 minutes
Shark Tale	United States	Vicky Jenson; Bibo Bergeron; Rob Letterman	DreamWorks Animation	Computer	Theatrical		September 10, 2004 (Venice); October 1, 2004 (United States)	90 minutes
Shrek 2	United States	Andrew Adamson; Kelly Asbury; Conrad Vernon	DreamWorks Animation; PDI/DreamWorks	Computer	Theatrical	Sequel to Shrek (2001); the film held the title for being the highest grossing animated feature until Toy Story 3 (2010).	May 15, 2004 (Cannes); May 19, 2004 (United States)	92 minutes
Souvenir from the Capital; Столичный сувенир (Stolichnyy suvenir)	Russia			Computer	Theatrical		December 1, 2004	50 minutes
The SpongeBob SquarePants Movie	United States	Stephen Hillenburg	Nickelodeon Movies; United Plankton Pictures	Traditional / Live action	Theatrical		November 14, 2004 (Grauman's Chinese Theatre); November 19, 2004 (United States)	87 minutes
Spookley the Square Pumpkin	Canada	Bernie Denk	Holiday Hill Farm	Computer	Theatrical		October 19, 2004	47 minutes
Steamboy	Japan	Katsuhiro Otomo	Sunrise	Traditional	Theatrical		July 17, 2004	126 minutes
Stellaluna	United States; Canada		Metro-Goldwyn-Mayer; Scholastic Productions	Traditional	Direct-to-video		July 12, 2004	41 minutes
Strings	Denmark; Sweden; Norway; United Kingdom	Anders Rønnow Klarlund	BOB Film Sweden AB; Bald Film; Film and Music Entertainment; Mainstream ApS; Nordisk Film; Radar Film; Sandrew Metronome Distribution; Zentropa Entertainments	Puppetry	Theatrical		September 4, 2004 (Venice); May 27, 2005 (United Kingdom; September 5, 2005 (Denmark)	91 minutes
Supertramps	Spain			Computer	Theatrical		December 1, 2004	79 minutes
Teacher's Pet	United States	Timothy Bjorklund	Walt Disney Television Animation	Traditional	Theatrical		January 16, 2004	74 minutes
Team America: World Police	Germany; United States	Trey Parker	Scott Rudin Productions	Puppetry	Theatrical		October 15, 2004	98 minutes
Tentacolino; Alla ricerca del Titanic (In Search of the Titanic)	Italy	Kim Jun-ok	Mondo TV	Computer / Traditional		Sequel to The Legend of the Titanic (1999).	2004	88 minutes
Teo, Intergalactic Hunter; Teo, cazador intergaláctico	Spain; Argentina			Traditional	Theatrical		December 9, 2004	80 minutes
Terkel in Trouble; Terkel i Knibe	Denmark	Kresten Vestbjerg Anderson; Thorbjørn Christoffersen; Stefan Fjeldmark	A. Film Production	Computer	Theatrical		March 20, 2004 (NatFilm Festival); April 2, 2004 (Denmark)	77 minutes
Tonka Tough Truck Adventures: The Biggest Show on Wheels	United States			Computer	Direct-to-video		September 28, 2004	60 minutes
Tracing Jake	Japan			Traditional	Theatrical		2004	113 minutes
VeggieTales: A Snoodle's Tale	United States	Mike Nawrocki; Marc Vulcano	Big Idea Productions	Computer	Direct-to-video		May 18, 2004	50 minutes
VeggieTales: An Easter Carol	United States	Tim Hodge	Big Idea Productions	Computer	Direct-to-video		February 10, 2004	49 minutes
VeggieTales: Sumo of the Opera	United States	Mike Nawrocki	Big Idea Productions	Computer	Direct-to-video		August 31, 2004	49 minutes
Winnie the Pooh: Springtime with Roo	United States	Elliot M. Bour; Saul Andrew Blinkoff	Walt Disney Studios Home Entertainment; DisneyToon Studios	Traditional	Direct-to-video		March 9, 2004	65 minutes
Yu-Gi-Oh! The Movie: Pyramid of Light 遊☆戯☆王デュエルモンスターズ 光のピラミッド (Yūgiō Dyueru Monsutāzu Hikari no Piramiddo)	Japan	Hatsuki Tsuji	4Kids Entertainment; Studio Gallop; NAS	Traditional	Theatrical		August 13, 2004 (United States); November 3, 2004 (Japan)	89 minutes (American release); 102 minutes (Japanese release)

== Highest-grossing films ==
The following is a list of the 10 highest-grossing animated feature films first released in 2004.

Highest-grossing animated films of 2004
Rank	Title	Studio	Worldwide gross	Ref.
1	Shrek 2	DreamWorks Animation	$935,253,978	
2	The Incredibles	Pixar	$631,442,092	
3	Shark Tale	DreamWorks Animation	$374,583,879	
4	The Polar Express	Castle Rock Entertainment	$307,514,317	
5	Howl's Moving Castle	Studio Ghibli	$237,814,327	
6	Home on the Range	Walt Disney Feature Animation	$145,358,062	
7	The SpongeBob SquarePants Movie	Nickelodeon Movies / United Plankton Pictures	$142,051,255	
8	Pokémon: Destiny Deoxys	OLM, Inc.	$34,337,258	
9	Doraemon: Nobita in the Wan-Nyan Spacetime Odyssey	Asatsu / Shin-Ei Animation	$26,663,978	
10	Detective Conan: Magician of the Silver Sky	TMS Entertainment	$22,618,511	

== See also ==
- List of animated television series of 2004

== Bibliography ==
- "Howl's Moving Castle". boxofficemojo.com.
- Galbraith IV, Stuart (2008). The Toho Studios Story: A History and Complete Filmography. Scarecrow Press. ISBN 978-1461673743.
- Geoghegan, Kev (5 December 2011). "Howl's Moving Castle adapted for the stage in Southwark". BBC.
