= List of animated feature films of 2003 =

This is a list of animated feature films first released in 2003.

== List ==
Title	Country	Director	Production company	Animation technique	Type	Notes	Release date	Duration
101 Dalmatians II: Patch's London Adventure	United States	Jim Kammerud; Brian Smith	Walt Disney Television Animation	Traditional	Direct-to-video	Sequel to One Hundred and One Dalmatians (1961).	January 21, 2003	74 minutes
The 3 Wise Men; Los Reyes magos	France; Spain		Animagicstudio; Carrere Group D.A. Telemadrid	Traditional	Theatrical	Antonio Navarro	December 19, 2003	76 minutes
The Animatrix	United States; Japan	Kōji Morimoto; Shinichirō Watanabe; Mahiro Maeda; Peter Chung; Andy Jones; Yoshiaki Kawajiri; Takeshi Koike	Village Roadshow Pictures; NPV Entertainment	Traditional	Direct-to-video		June 3, 2003	102 minutes
Go! Anpanman: Ruby's Wish それいけ!アンパンマン ルビーの願い	Japan	Hiroyuki Yano	Anpanman Production Committee; TMS Entertainment	Traditional			July 12, 2003	50 minutes
Asu o Tsukutta Otoko - Tanabe Sakuro to Biwako Sosui 明日をつくった男 田辺朔郎と琵琶湖疏水 (The Man Who Changed History - A Drannage of Lake Biwa)	Japan	Shinichi Ushiyama	Mushi Production; Flamingo View Company (collaboration)	Traditional	Theatrical	Fictionlisation of the life of Tanabe Sakuro (December 2, 1861 – September 5, 1944), a Japanese civil engineer and early pioneer in hydro electric power development.	March 13, 2003	86 minutes
Atlantis: Milo's Return	United States	Victor Cook; Toby Shelton; Tad Stones	Walt Disney Television Animation	Traditional	Direct-to-video		May 20, 2003	80 minutes
A Wobots Christmas	United States	Cory Edwards	Blue Yonder Films; Live Bait Productions; PorchLight Entertainment	Computer	Direct-to-video		December 17, 2003	50 minutes
Baby Looney Tunes' Eggs-traordinary Adventure	United States	Gloria Yuh Jenkins	Warner Bros. Animation	Traditional	Direct-to-video		February 11, 2003	60 minutes
Back to School with Franklin	Canada	Arna Selznick	Nelvana	Traditional	Direct-to-video		August 19, 2003	46 minutes
Barbie of Swan Lake	United States	Owen Hurley	Mainframe Entertainment; Mattel Entertainment	Computer	Direct-to-video		September 30, 2003	83 minutes
Batman: Mystery of the Batwoman	United States	Curt Geda	Warner Bros. Television Animation	Traditional	Direct-to-video		October 21, 2003	74 minutes
Ben Hur	United States; Canada	William R. Kowalchuk Jr.	Agamemnon Films; Tundra Productions	Traditional	Direct-to-video	Charlton Heston reprise his titular role from the 1959 film based on the same source material for this animated adaptation.	February 15, 2003	80 minutes
Betizu izar artean	Spain	Egoitz Rodríguez Olea	Baleuko S.L.	Computer	Theatrical		October 31, 2003	71 minutes
Bionicle: Mask of Light	United States	Terry Shakespeare; David Molina	Miramax Home Entertainment; The Lego Group; Create TV & Film; Creative Capers Entertainment; CGCG	Computer	Direct-to-video		September 13, 2003 (Legoland); September 16, 2003 (United States)	70 minutes
Bolívar el héroe	Colombia			Traditional	Theatrical		December 25, 2003	75 minutes
Brother Bear	United States	Aaron Blaise; Robert Walker	Walt Disney Feature Animation	Traditional	Theatrical	The final Walt Disney feature to be made in the Florida division before the studio was closed in 2004	November 1, 2003	85 minutes
Captain Sabertooth; Kaptein Sabeltann	Norway			Traditional	Theatrical		December 26, 2003	75 minutes
The Cat in the Hat	United States	Bo Welch	Universal Pictures; DreamWorks Pictures; Imagine Entertainment	Computer / Live action	Theatrical		November 21, 2003	82 minutes
Cesante	Chile	Ricardo Amunátegui	Emu Films; Sobras Producciones; ADN Digital	Traditional	Theatrical		June 5, 2003	72 minutes
Charlotte's Web 2: Wilbur's Great Adventure	United States	Mario Piluso	Universal Home Entertainment Productions; Paramount Pictures Corporation; Nickelodeon Animation Studio	Traditional	Direct-to-video		March 18, 2003	79 minutes
El Cid: The Legend; El Cid: La leyenda	Spain	José Pozo	Filmax Animation	Traditional	Theatrical		December 19, 2003	90 minutes
Crayon Shin-chan: The Storm Called: Yakiniku Road of Honor クレヨンしんちゃん 嵐を呼ぶ 栄光のヤキニクロード; Kureyon Shinchan: Arashi o Yobu: Eikō no Yakuniku Rōdo	Japan	Tsutomu Mizushima	Shin-Ei Animation	Traditional	Theatrical		April 19, 2003	88 minutes
The Cunning Little Vixen	United Kingdom	Geoff Dunbar	BBC	Traditional	Television film		April 20, 2003	75 minutes
Detective Conan: Crossroad in the Ancient Capital 名探偵コナン迷宮の十字路; Meitantei Konan: Meikyū no Kurosurōdo	Japan	Kenji Kodama	TMS Entertainment	Traditional	Theatrical		April 19, 2003	108 minutes
The Dog, the General, and the Birds; Le chien, le général et les oiseaux	Italy; France	Francis Nielsen	Solaris; Roissy Films; Téva; Prima Film; Gam Films; Rai Fiction; Canal+	Traditional	Theatrical		May 15, 2003 (Cannes); October 22, 2003 (France)	75 minutes
Dominator	United Kingdom	Tony Luke	Renga Media	Computer	Direct-to-video		May 21, 2003 (Cannes)	100 minutes 75 minutes (United Kingdom)
Doraemon: Nobita and the Windmasters ドラえもん のび太とふしぎ風使い; Doraemon Nobita to Fushigi Kazetsukai	Japan	Tsutomu Shibayama	Shin-Ei Animation	Traditional	Theatrical		March 8, 2003	84 minutes
El Embrujo del Sur	Spain	Juan Bautista Berasategi		Traditional	Theatrical		July 4, 2003	83 minutes
Elysium	South Korea	Hyo Sun Hwang	Digital Dream Studios	Computer	Theatrical		September 9, 2003 (South Korea); June 2, 2005 (DVD)	84 minutes
The Fairly OddParents: Abra-Catastrophe!	United States	Butch Hartman	Frederator Studios; Nickelodeon Animation Studio	Traditional	Television film		July 12, 2003	72 minutes
Finding Nemo	United States	Andrew Stanton	Pixar Animation Studios	Computer	Theatrical	First Pixar feature to win Best Animated Feature, later re-released for 3D in 2012 and the highest grossing animated film from the 2000s.	May 30, 2003	100 minutes
G.I. Joe: Spy Troops	United States	Dale Carman	Reel FX Creative Studios; Hasbro Entertainment	Computer	Direct-to-video		September 27, 2003	45 minutes
Globi and the Stolen Shadows; Globi und der Schattenräuber	Germany; Switzerland; Luxembourg	Robi Engler	Sponge	Traditional	Theatrical		October 2, 2003 (German speaking region); August 18, 2005 (German)	72 minutes
Hammerboy	South Korea	Ahn Tae-geun	Sponge	Traditional	Theatrical		August 20, 2003 Big Apple Anime Fest; August 6, 2004 (South Korea)	80 minutes
Hamtaro: Miracle in Aurora Valley 劇場版 とっとこハム太郎 ハムハムグランプリン オーロラ谷の奇跡 リボンちゃん危機一髪! (Gekijō-ban Tottoko Hamutarō Hamu-Hamu Guran Purin: Ōrora Tani no Kiseki - Ribon-chan Kiki Ippatsu!)	Japan	Osamu Dezaki	TMS Entertainment	Traditional	Theatrical	Third installment in the Hamtaro film series.	December 13, 2003	55 minutes
Hajime no Ippo – Champion Road はじめの一歩 : チャンピオンロード	Japan	Hitoshi Nanba	Madhouse	Traditional	Television film	from "Fighting Spirit" series	April 18, 2003	90 minutes
Interstella 5555: The 5tory of the 5ecret 5tar 5ystem インターステラ5555	Japan; France	Kazuhisa Takenouchi	Toei Animation; Daft Life Ltd. Wild Bunch; BAC Films	Traditional	Theatrical		May 18, 2003 (Cannes); May 28, 2003 (worldwide)	65 minutes
Inuyasha the Movie: Swords of an Honorable Ruler	Japan	Toshiya Shinohara	Sunrise	Traditional	Theatrical		December 20, 2003	100 minutes
I Want a Dog for Christmas, Charlie Brown	United States		United Media; Mendelson-Melendez	Traditional	Television film		December 9, 2003	41 minutes
Jake's Booty Call	United States	Eric Eisner; J. Chad Hammes	National Lampoon Productions; Romp Films; The Romp	Traditional	Theatrical		April 25, 2003	77 minutes
Jester Till; Till Eulenspiegel	Germany; Belgium			Traditional	Theatrical		September 20, 2003 Hamburg Film Festival; September 25, 2003 Germany	85 minutes
Joshua and the Promised Land	United States	Jim Lion		Computer	Direct-to-video		December 23, 2003	53 minutes
The Jungle Book 2	United States	Steve Trenbirth	Disneytoon Studios	Traditional	Theatrical	Sequel to The Jungle Book (1967).	February 14, 2003	72 minutes
Kangaroo Jack	United States; Australia	David McNally	Castle Rock Entertainment; Jerry Bruckheimer Films	Computer / Live action	Theatrical		January 17, 2003	89 minutes
Kaena: The Prophecy	France; Canada	Chris Delaporte; Pascal Pinon	Xilam	Computer	Theatrical		June 4, 2003	85 minutes
Kim Possible: A Sitch in Time	United States	Steve Loter	Walt Disney Television Animation	Traditional	Television film		November 28, 2003	67 minutes
KochiKame the Movie 2: UFO Attack! The Great Tornado Strategy!! こちら葛飾区亀有公園前派出所 THE MOVIE2 UFO襲来! トルネード大作戦!! (Kochira Katsushika-ku Kameari Kōen-mae Hashutsujo the Movie 2: UFO Shūrai! Tornado Daisakusen!!)	Japan	Shinji Takamatsu	Studio Gallop	Traditional	Theatrical		December 20, 2003	109 minutes
The Little Polar Bear: Nanouk's Rescue	Germany	Thilo Rothkirch		Traditional	Theatrical		November 20, 2003	78 minutes
The Little Polar Bear: The Dream of Flying	Germany	Thilo Rothkirch		Traditional	Theatrical		March 27, 2003	76 minutes
The Land Before Time X: The Great Longneck Migration	United States	Charles Grosvenor	Universal Cartoon Studios	Traditional	Direct-to-video	The tenth installment in The Land Before Time film series.	December 2, 2003	85 minutes
La Légende de Parva	France; Italy	Jean Cubaud		Traditional	Theatrical		February 12, 2003	85 minutes
The Legend of the Sky Kingdom	Zimbabwe	Roger Hawkins		Stop-motion	Theatrical	First animated feature from Zimbabwe and Africa	October 2003	73 minutes
Little Bee Julia & Lady Life; L'Apetta Giulia e la signora Vita	Italy			Computer	Theatrical		September 19, 2003	76 minutes
Little Longnose; Карлик Нос (Karlik Nos)	Russia	Ilya Maksimov	Melnitsa Animation Studio	Traditional	Theatrical		March 20, 2003	79 minutes
The Lizzie McGuire Movie	United States	Jim Fall	Walt Disney Pictures; Stan Rogow Productions	Traditional / Live action	Theatrical		May 2, 2003	94 minutes
Looney Tunes: Back in Action	United States	Joe Dante	Warner Bros. Feature Animation; Baltimore/Spring Creek Productions; Goldmann Pictures	Traditional / Live action	Theatrical	Final animated feature made by Warner Bros. Pictures until The Lego Movie becoming Warner Animation Group years later.	November 9, 2003 (premiere); November 14, 2003 (United States)	93 minutes
Lupin III: Operation Return the Treasure ルパン三世 お宝返却大作戦!! (Rupan Sansei: Otakara Henkyaku Dai-sakusen!!)	Japan	Jun Kawagoe	TMS Entertainment	Traditional	Television special		August 1, 2003	91 minutes
Master Q: Incredible Pet Detective	Hong Kong			Traditional	Theatrical		December 20, 2003	73 minutes
Mécanix	Canada	Rémy M. Larochelle	Ofilms; Avant-Gore	Traditional/ Live-action	Theatrical		October 10, 2003 (Lausanne Underground Film Festival); July 10, 2004 (Canada)	70 minutes
Miss Spider's Sunny Patch Kids	Canada	Mike Fallows	Metro-Goldwyn-Mayer; Nelvana; Callaway Arts & Entertainment	Computer	Television film	Pilot to the show Miss Spider's Sunny Patch Friends.	March 31, 2003	49 minutes
More Vampires in Havana; Más vampiros en La Habana	Cuba; Spain			Traditional	Theatrical		December 7, 2003 (Havana Film Festival)	80 minutes
Movie Critters' Big Picture	United States	Steven F. Zambo		Puppets		Dove Foundation Seal of Approval, 3 Telly Awards, Aurora Awards. Contains musical parts and parodical characters inspired by Hollywood celebrities (Arnold Hamandegger, Cary Ant, Frankie Sinatrat, Charlie Chimplin, Jay Rhino, Gloria Swansong, Benny Gopher, etc.)	August 1, 2003	80 minutes
A MushSnail Tale	United States	Scott Cawthon	Cawthon Entertainment	Computer	Direct-to-video		2003	38 minutes
My Son Goku ぼくの孫悟空 (Boku no Son Goku)	Japan	Akio Sugino; Fumihiro Yoshimura	Tezuka Productions; Art Vivant Co., Ltd.	Traditional	Theatrical		July 12, 2003	95 minutes
Nasu: Summer in Andalusia 茄子 アンダルシアの夏; Nasu: Andarushia no Natsu	Japan	Kitarō Kōsaka	Madhouse	Traditional	Theatrical		December 21, 2003	47 minutes
The Night B4 Christmas	United States	Emory Myrick; Tom Tataranowicz	Nite B4 Productions; Sunwoo Entertainment	Traditional	Television film		2003	70 minutes
One Piece The Movie: Dead End no Bōken	Japan	Konosuke Uda	Toei Animation	Traditional	Theatrical		March 1, 2003	95 minutes
Opopomoz	Italy; France; Spain	Enzo D'Alò	Albachiara; Rai Cinema; DeAPlaneta	Traditional	Theatrical		December 5, 2003	80 minutes
Oseam 오세암	South Korea	Sung Baek-yeop	Sinabro Entertainment	Traditional	Theatrical		April 25, 2003	77 minutes
Otherworld; Y Mabinogi	United Kingdom; Wales	Derek W. Hayes; Marc Evans	Sianel Pedwar Cymru, S4C International; Cartwn Cymru Production; Cyngor Celfyddydau Cyrmu/Arts Council of Wales; BBC Cymru; British Screen; British Sky Broadcasting; Odyssey Entertainment	Traditional	Theatrical		June 27, 2003	108 minutes
Piglet's Big Movie	United States	Francis Glebas	Disneytoon Studios	Traditional	Theatrical		March 16, 2003 (Premiere); March 21, 2003 (United States); July 2, 2003 (Manila, Philippines)	75 minutes
Pokémon: Jirachi, Wish Maker 劇場版ポケットモンスターアドバンスジェネレーション 七夜の願い星 ジラーチ (Gekijōban Poketto Monsutā Adobansu Jenerēshon Nanayo no Negaiboshi Jirāchi)	Japan	Kunihiko Yuyama	OLM, Inc.	Traditional	Theatrical		July 19, 2003	81 minutes
The Rain Children; Les Enfants de la pluie	France; South Korea	Philippe Leclerc	Praxinos	Traditional	Theatrical		June 25, 2003	86 minutes
Raining Cats and Frogs aka. The Frog Prophecy; La Prophétie des grenouilles	France	Jacques-Rémy Girerd	Folimage	Traditional	Theatrical		December 3, 2003	90 minutes
Rescue Heroes: The Movie	Canada	Ron Pitts	Nelvana; Fisher-Price	Computer	Direct-to-video		November 18, 2003	83 minutes
Recess: All Growed Down	United States	Howy Parkins; Brenda Piluso	Paul & Joe Productions; Walt Disney Television Animation	Traditional	Direct-to-video		December 9, 2003	61 minutes
Recess: Taking the Fifth Grade	United States	Howy Parkins	Paul & Joe Productions; Walt Disney Television Animation	Traditional	Direct-to-video		December 9, 2003	62 minutes
The Return of Mushsnail: The Legend of The Snowmill	United States	Scott Cawthon	Scott Entertainment	Computer	Direct-to-video		2003	44 minutes
Rolie Polie Olie: The Baby Bot Chase	Canada; United States		Nelvana; Sparx*	Computer	Direct-to-video		June 3, 2003	70 minutes
Rugrats Go Wild	United States	Norton Virgien; John Eng	Nickelodeon Movies; Klasky Csupo	Traditional	Theatrical		June 13, 2003	80 minutes
Scary Godmother: Halloween Spooktakular	Canada	Ezekiel Norton	Mainframe Entertainment	Computetr	Television film		July 18, 2003	48 minutes
Scooby-Doo! and the Legend of the Vampire	United States	Scott Jeralds	Warner Bros. Animation	Traditional	Direct-to-video		March 4, 2003	72 minutes
Scooby-Doo! and the Monster of Mexico	United States	Scott Jeralds	Warner Bros. Animation	Traditional	Direct-to-video		September 30, 2003	
Sinbad: Legend of the Seven Seas	United States	Tim Johnson; Patrick Gilmore	DreamWorks Animation	Traditional / Computer	Theatrical	The final hand-drawn feature made by DreamWorks because of its failure at the box office and decided to finish the medium entirely.	July 2, 2003	86 minutes
Son of Alladin	India	Singeetam Srinivasa Rao	Pentamedia Graphics	Computer	Direct-to-video		August 29, 2003	80 minutes
The Souricière; La Souricière	France	Stéphane Margail; Sandrine Conte	TAT Productions	Stop-motion	Short film			
Stitch! The Movie	United States	Tony Craig; Bobs Gannaway	Walt Disney Television Animation	Traditional	Direct-to-video	Direct-to-video and pilot to the spinoff, Lilo & Stitch: The Series	August 26, 2003	64 minutes
Tokyo Godfathers	Japan	Satoshi Kon	Madhouse	Traditional	Theatrical		August 30, 2003 (Big Apple Anime Fest); November 8, 2003 (Japan)	92 minutes
Toto Sapore and the Magic Story of Pizza; Totò Sapore e la magica storia della pizza	Italy	Maurizio Forestieri	Medusa Film; Lanterna Magica	Traditional	Theatrical		December 19, 2003	80 minutes
The Triplets of Belleville aka. Belleville Rendez-Vous; Les Triplettes de Belleville	France; Belgium; Canada; United Kingdom	Sylvain Chomet	Les Armateurs; Champion; Vivi Film; France 3 Cinéma; RGP France; BBC Bristol; BBC Worldwide	Traditional	Theatrical		May 18, 2003 (Cannes); June 11, 2003 (France); June 25, 2003 (Belgium); August 29, 2003 (United Kingdom)	78 minutes
A Very Wompkee Christmas	United States	Michael DeVitto	Deos Animation; MarVista Entertainment; Wompkees	Computer	Direct-to-video		November 2003	54 minutes
Werner – Gekotzt wird später!	Germany			Traditional	Theatrical		July 17, 2003	76 minutes
Winter Days	Japan	Kihachirō Kawamoto		Traditional	Theatrical	Collaboration between top animators from around the world.	November 27, 2003	105 minutes (40 minutes animation)
Wizards & Giants; Magos y Gigantes	Mexico	Andrés Couturier; Eduardo Sprowls	Ánima Estudios	Flash animation	Theatrical	First theatrically released animated film created with Adobe Flash.	November 19, 2003	84 minutes
Wonderful Days	South Korea; United States	Kim Moon-saeng	Endgame Entertainment; Masquerade Films; Maxmedia; Tin House Productions	Traditional / Computer	Theatrical		July 17, 2003	86 minutes (Original Release); 95 minutes (Director's Cut)

== Highest-grossing films ==
The following is a list of the 10 highest-grossing animated feature films first released in 2003.

Rank	Title	Studio	Worldwide gross	Ref.
1	Finding Nemo	Pixar	$936,743,261	
2	Brother Bear	Walt Disney Feature Animation	$250,397,798	
3	The Jungle Book 2	DisneyToon Studios	$135,703,599	
4	Sinbad: Legend of the Seven Seas	DreamWorks Animation	$80,767,884	
5	Piglet's Big Movie	DisneyToon Studios / Munich Animation	$62,870,546	
6	Rugrats Go Wild	Nickelodeon Movies / Klasky Csupo	$55,405,066	
7	Pokémon: Jirachi—Wish Maker	OLM, Inc.	$33,393,751	
8	Detective Conan: Crossroad in the Ancient Capital	TMS Entertainment	$24,342,320	
9	Doraemon: Nobita and the Windmasters	Asatsu	$20,428,491	
10	One Piece The Movie: Dead End no Bōken	Toei Animation	$14,817,006	

== See also ==
- List of animated television series of 2003
