= 2026 in film =

2026 in film is an overview of events in the film industry scheduled to occur in 2026. Best Picture Academy Award-winners All Quiet on the Western Front and Cimarron entered the public domain this year.

== Highest-grossing films ==
† Indicates films currently in theatrical release in the week commencing 20 November 2026.

Highest-grossing films of 2026
Rank	Title	Distributor	Worldwide gross
1	Spider-Man: Brand New Day †	Sony	$2,523,728,253
2	The Odyssey	Universal	$1,805,368,479
3	Toy Story 5	Disney	$1,149,545,392
4	Michael	Lionsgate / Universal	$1,028,703,388
5	The Super Mario Galaxy Movie	Universal	$1,013,295,263
6	The Devil Wears Prada 2	20th Century	$693,492,689
7	Project Hail Mary	Amazon MGM / Sony	$685,052,245
8	Pegasus 3	Maoyan	$656,469,847
9	Minions & Monsters	Universal	$530,771,768
10	Obsession	Focus / Universal	$524,553,256

=== Box office records ===
- Spider-Man: Brand New Day became the highest-grossing film of all time domestically in the United States and Canada, surpassing Star Wars: The Force Awakens (2015). Lucasfilm congratulated the film for beating their record.
  - It had the biggest opening weekend ever in the United States and Canada with $360 million, outdoing Avengers: Endgame (2019). It also represented the second film to debut with more than $300 million domestically.
  - The film had the biggest opening day in the United States and Canada with $168 million, overtaking Endgame.
  - It crossed the $1 billion worldwide milestone six days after release, becoming the second-fastest film to reach that milestone behind Endgame.
  - It became the 64th film overall to gross $1 billion worldwide.
  - The film crossed the $2 billion milestone, surpassing the $1.9 billion gross of Spider-Man: No Way Home, becoming the highest-grossing Spider-Man film worldwide and the highest-grossing Sony Pictures release worldwide. It reached the milestone in 19 days, becoming the second-fastest film to reach that milestone behind Endgame.
  - Spider-Man: Brand New Day became the 8th film to cross the $2 billion mark, the third film to cross the $2.5 billion mark and the third-highest grossing film of all time.
  - In India, it had the biggest opening for a foreign film (surpassing Avengers: Endgame) and became the highest-grossing foreign film ever (surpassing Avatar: The Way of Water).
- Avengers: Endgame became the highest grossing movie of all time in October, with the re-release Encore making the film surpass Avatar for the second time. Endgame initially surpassed Avatar in July 2019, after which the latter retook the record in March 2021.
- The Odyssey became the highest-grossing R-rated film of all time, surpassing Deadpool & Wolverine (2024).
  - It became the 65th film overall to cross $1 billion worldwide.
  - It became Christopher Nolan's highest-grossing film worldwide, surpassing The Dark Knight Rises (2012).
  - It had the highest-grossing opening weekend and the biggest second weekend for Nolan, surpassing The Dark Knight Rises.
  - The film set the record for the highest-grossing opening weekend at BFI IMAX, surpassing Star Wars: The Last Jedi (2017).
  - It became the highest-grossing IMAX release of all time, surpassing Avatar (2009).
  - It became the first R-rated film to cross $1.8 billion and became the eleventh-highest grossing film of all time.
  - It became Nolan's highest-grossing film domestically, surpassing The Dark Knight (2008).
  - It became the highest-grossing Universal film ever, surpassing Jurassic World (2015).
- The Toy Story film series surpassed $4 billion with the release of Toy Story 5.
  - Toy Story 5 became the highest grossing film of the Toy Story franchise, surpassing Toy Story 4 (2019).
  - It became the 17th animated film and 63rd overall to cross $1 billion and also became tenth-highest grossing animated film of all time.
  - Toy Story became the first animated franchise to have 3 films surpass $1 billion.
- Michael became the highest-grossing biopic of all time, surpassing Oppenheimer (2023).
  - It has the biggest opening weekend for a biopic with $217.4 million grossed worldwide. It also has the biggest opening weekend for a musical biopic.
  - It became the highest-grossing Lionsgate film ever, surpassing The Twilight Saga: Breaking Dawn Part 2 (2012) and The Hunger Games: Catching Fire (2013).
  - The film became the highest-grossing musical biopic of all time, dethroning Bohemian Rhapsody (2018).
  - The film surpassed The Passion of the Christ (2004) to become the highest-grossing biopic domestically in North America.
  - It became the first biopic and the 62nd overall to gross over $1 billion worldwide.
  - Jaafar Jackson, who made his acting debut in Michael, became the first lead actor to debut with over $1 billion.
- The Super Mario film series surpassed $2 billion with the release of The Super Mario Galaxy Movie. It became the first video game film franchise to surpass $2 billion.
  - Super Mario became the first animated film franchise with two films opening with more than $350 million worldwide.
  - The Super Mario Galaxy Movie became the first film of 2026 and the 61st overall to cross $1 billion.
  - Super Mario became the first video game film franchise with two films crossing $1 billion.
- The Devil Wears Prada film series surpassed $1 billion with the release of The Devil Wears Prada 2.
  - The Devil Wears Prada 2 became the highest-grossing film in the franchise, surpassing its predecessor.
- Project Hail Mary became Metro-Goldwyn-Mayer's highest-grossing domestic release, surpassing Skyfall (2012).
  - Project Hail Mary also became the highest-grossing puppet film surpassing The Muppets (2011).
- Pegasus 3 became the highest-grossing pure sports film of all time, surpassing F1 (2025).
  - The Pegasus film series surpassed $1 billion with the release of Pegasus 3.
- Obsession became Focus Features' highest grossing domestic release in its history, and is one of the most profitable in history having been produced on a $750,000 budget.
  - The film became the first film since E.T. the Extra-Terrestrial (1982) to see ticket sales increase in its second and third weekends respectively outside of the holiday season.
  - The film surpassed The Blair Witch Project (1999) to become the highest-grossing film festival acquisition of all time.
  - It surpassed Sinners (2025) to become the highest-grossing original Hollywood live-action film of the decade.
  - The film surpassed Enter the Dragon (1973) to become the highest-grossing low-budget film with a production budget under $1 million.
- With the release of Minions & Monsters, the Despicable Me franchise became the first animated film franchise to surpass $6 billion.
- Backrooms became A24's biggest opening weekend in its history with $118 million globally.
  - Backrooms became A24's highest grossing film to date, overtaking Marty Supreme (2025).
  - Director Kane Parsons was 20 years old at the time of the film's release, making him the youngest filmmaker to reach number one at the United States box office. The previous record holder, Josh Trank, was 27 years old when his film Chronicle (2012) was released.
- The Moana franchise surpassed $2 billion with the release of the live-action remake of the original Moana film.
- The Scary Movie film series surpassed $1 billion with the release of Scary Movie 6. It became the first parody film franchise to surpass $1 billion.
- The Scream film series became the sixth horror film franchise to surpass $1 billion with the release of Scream 7.
  - Scream 7 became the highest grossing film in the series, surpassing Scream (1996).

=== Franchise records ===
- The Marvel Cinematic Universe became the first franchise to surpass $33 billion, $34 billion and $35 billion with the release of Spider-Man: Brand New Day as well as the rerelease Avengers: Endgame Encore.
- The Marvel Cinematic Universe also became the first franchise to have 12 films to surpass $1 billion and 3 films to surpass $2 billion.
- The Spider-Man film series became the second film franchise to surpass $12 and $13 billion with the release of Spider Man: Brand New Day.

=== Other records ===
- With 718.6 million views in the first 24 hours and later crossing 1.1 billion, Spider-Man: Brand New Day (2026) became the most-viewed trailer of all time, surpassing Deadpool & Wolverine (2024).
- At $210 million, Ramayana: Part 1 became the most expensive non-English language film ever made at the time of its release surpassing The Battle at Lake Changjin (2021).
- Universal became the second film studio to release 3 or more films grossing over $1 billion in one year twice (Note: Universal first achieved this in 2015 with Jurassic World, Furious 7 and Minions.), after Disney, who did it 5 times. (Note: In 2016, 2018, 2019, 2024 and 2025)

== Events ==
=== Scheduled award ceremonies ===
Date	Event	Host	Location(s)	Ref.
January 4	31st Critics' Choice Awards	Critics Choice Association	Barker Hangar, Santa Monica, California, U.S.	
January 11	83rd Golden Globe Awards	Golden Globes, LLC	Beverly Hills, California, U.S.	
January 17	38th European Film Awards	European Film Academy	Berlin, Germany	
January 18	31st Lumière Awards	Académie des Lumières	Paris, France	
January 19	61st Guldbagge Awards	Swedish Film Institute	Stockholm, Sweden	
January 24	13th Feroz Awards	Asociación de Informadores Cinematográficos de España	Pontevedra, Galicia, Spain	
January 31	5th Carmen Awards	Academia de Cine de Andalucía	Granada, Andalusia, Spain	
February 7	78th Directors Guild of America Awards	Directors Guild of America	Beverly Hills, California, U.S.	
February 8	18th Gaudí Awards	Catalan Film Academy	Barcelona, Catalonia, Spain	
February 21	53rd Annie Awards	ASIFA-Hollywood	Los Angeles, California, U.S.	
February 22	79th British Academy Film Awards	British Academy of Film and Television Arts	London, England, UK	
February 26	51st César Awards	Académie des Arts et Techniques du Cinéma	Paris, France	
February 28	37th Producers Guild of America Awards	Producers Guild of America	Los Angeles, California, U.S.	
February 28	40th Goya Awards	Academy of Cinematographic Arts and Sciences of Spain	Barcelona, Catalonia, Spain	
March 1	32nd Actor Awards	SAG-AFTRA	Los Angeles, California, U.S.	
March 7	15th René Awards	Académie André Delvaux	Ixelles, Belgium	
March 8	53rd Saturn Awards	Academy of Science Fiction, Fantasy and Horror Films	Universal City, California, U.S.	
March 8	78th Writers Guild of America Awards	Writers Guild of America East; Writers Guild of America West	Edison Ballroom (East Ceremony)	
March 14	46th Golden Raspberry Awards	Golden Raspberry Awards Foundation	Los Angeles, California, U.S.	
March 14	Zee Chitra Gaurav Puraskar 2026	Zee Marathi	Mumbai, Maharashtra, India	
March 15	98th Academy Awards	Academy of Motion Picture Arts and Sciences	Los Angeles, California, U.S.	
March 16	34th Actors and Actresses Union Awards	Actors and Actresses Union	Madrid, Spain	
March 26	9th ALMA Awards	ALMA. Sindicato de guionistas	Madrid, Spain	
April 19	44th Hong Kong Film Awards	Hong Kong Film Awards Association	Hong Kong	
May 6	71st David di Donatello	Accademia del Cinema Italiano	Rome, Italy	
May 9	13th Platino Awards	EGEDA, FIPCA	Riviera Maya, Quintana Roo, Mexico	
May 23	10th Crunchyroll Anime Awards	Crunchyroll	Tokyo, Japan	
May 31	14th Canadian Screen Awards	Academy of Canadian Cinema & Television	Toronto, Ontario, Canada	
June 2	20th Sur Awards	Argentine Academy of Cinematography Arts and Sciences	Buenos Aires, Argentina	
September 12–13	14th South Indian International Movie Awards	Vibri Media Group	Bengaluru, Karnataka, India	
October 3	68th Ariel Awards	Academia Mexicana de Artes y Ciencias Cinematográficas	TBD	
October 30	19th Asia Pacific Screen Awards	UNESCO, FIAPF (International Federation of Film Producers Associations) and the Brisbane City Council, in partnership with APSA	The Star Gold Coast, Gold Coast, Queensland, Australia	
November 8	11th Critics' Choice Documentary Awards	Critics Choice Association	Edison Ballroom, New York City, United States	
November 14	2026 Kids' Choice Awards	Television City	Los Angeles, California	
November 25	47th Blue Dragon Film Awards	Blue Dragon Film Awards	KBS Hall, Yeouido, Seoul	
December 19	32nd Forqué Awards	EGEDA	Madrid, Spain	

=== Film festivals ===
Date	Event	Host	Location(s)	Ref.
January 2 – 12	37th Palm Springs International Film Festival	Palm Springs International Film Festival	Palm Springs, California, United States	
January 15 – 22	26th Pune International Film Festival	Pune International Film Festival	Pune, Maharashtra, India	
January 22 – February 1	2026 Sundance Film Festival	Sundance Film Festival	Park City, Utah, United States	
January 29 – February 8	55th International Film Festival Rotterdam	International Film Festival Rotterdam	Rotterdam, Netherlands	
February 4 – 14	41st Santa Barbara International Film Festival	Santa Barbara International Film Festival	Santa Barbara, California, United States	
February 12 – 22	76th Berlin International Film Festival	Berlin International Film Festival	Berlin, Germany	
February 25 – March 8	22nd Glasgow Film Festival	Glasgow Film Festival	Glasgow, United Kingdom	
March 6 – 15	29th Málaga Film Festival	Málaga Film Festival	Málaga, Spain	
April 17 – 25	41st Guadalajara International Film Festival	Guadalajara International Film Festival	Guadalajara, Mexico	
May 7 – 17	2026 Seattle International Film Festival	Seattle International Film Festival	Seattle, Washington, United States	
May 12 – 23	2026 Cannes Film Festival	Cannes Film Festival	Cannes, France	
July 3 – July 11	60th Karlovy Vary International Film Festival	Karlovy Vary International Film Festival	Karlovy Vary, Czech Republic	
10 – 26 July	25th New York Asian Film Festival	New York Asian Film Foundation Inc.	New York, United States	
August 5 – 15	79th Locarno Film Festival	Locarno Film Festival	Locarno, Switzerland	
August 13 – 19	79th Edinburgh International Film Festival	Edinburgh International Film Festival	Edinburgh, United Kingdom	
August 14 – 21	32nd Sarajevo Film Festival	Sarajevo Film Festival	Sarajevo, Bosnia & Herzegovina	
September 2 – 12	83rd Venice International Film Festival	Venice Film Festival	Venice, Italy	
September 10 – 20	2026 Toronto International Film Festival	Toronto International Film Festival	Toronto, Ontario, Canada	
September 18 – 26	74th San Sebastián International Film Festival	San Sebastián International Film Festival	San Sebastián, Spain	
September 25 – October 12	2026 New York Film Festival	New York Film Festival	New York City, United States	
October 6 – 15	31st Busan International Film Festival	Busan International Film Festival	Busan, South Korea	
October 7 – 18	2026 BFI London Film Festival	BFI London Film Festival	London, England, United Kingdom	
October 8 – 18	59th Sitges Film Festival	Sitges Film Festival	Sitges, Spain	
October 13 – 25	21st Rome Film Festival	Rome Film Festival	Rome, Italy	
October 14 – 25	62nd Chicago International Film Festival	Chicago International Film Festival	Chicago, United States	
October 21 – November 1	37th Singapore International Film Festival	Singapore International Film Festival	Singapore	
October 23 – 31	71st Valladolid International Film Festival	Valladolid International Film Festival	Valladolid, Spain	
October 26 – November 4	39th Tokyo International Film Festival	Tokyo International Film Festival	Tokyo, Japan	
November 11 – 26	2026 Stockholm International Film Festival	Stockholm International Film Festival	Stockholm, Sweden	

== Awards ==
Category	32nd Critics' Choice Awards January 3, 2027	84th Golden Globe Awards January 10, 2027		80th BAFTA Awards February 21, 2027	Producers, Directors, Actors, and Writers Guild Awards January 30 – February 28, 2027	99th Academy Awards March 14, 2027
Category	32nd Critics' Choice Awards January 3, 2027	Drama	Musical or Comedy	80th BAFTA Awards February 21, 2027	Producers, Directors, Actors, and Writers Guild Awards January 30 – February 28, 2027	99th Academy Awards March 14, 2027
Best Picture						
Best Director						
Best Actor						
Best Actress						
Best Supporting Actor						
Best Supporting Actress						
Best Screenplay, Adapted						
Best Screenplay, Original						
Best Animated Film						
Best Original Score					—N/a	
Best Original Song				—N/a	—N/a	
Best Foreign Language Film					—N/a	
Best Documentary (Note: From 2016 onward, the category was shifted from the Critics' Choice Awards to the ancillary Critics' Choice Documentary Awards.)	You Can See Everything	—N/a				

Golden Bear (76th Berlin International Film Festival):

Yellow Letters, directed by İlker Çatak, Germany & Turkey

Palme d'Or (2026 Cannes Film Festival):

Fjord, directed by Cristian Mungiu, Romania

Golden Lion (83rd Venice International Film Festival):

Woman Unknown, directed by May el-Toukhy, Denmark, Sweden & Latvia

People's Choice Award (51st Toronto International Film Festival):

La bola negra, directed by Javier Calvo & Javier Ambrossi, Spain & France

== 2026 films ==
=== By country/region ===
- List of American films of 2026
- List of Argentine films of 2026
- List of Australian films of 2026
- List of Bangladeshi films of 2026
- List of British films of 2026
- List of Canadian films of 2026
- List of Chinese films of 2026
- List of French films of 2026
- List of Hong Kong films of 2026
- List of Indian films of 2026
- List of Japanese films of 2026
- List of Mexican films of 2026
- List of Pakistani films of 2026
- List of Philippine films of 2026
- List of Romanian films of 2026
- List of Singaporean films of 2026
- List of South Korean films of 2026
- List of Spanish films of 2026

=== By genre ===
- List of animated feature films of 2026
- List of horror films of 2026
- List of LGBTQ-related films of 2026

== Deaths ==
Month	Date	Name	Age	Country	Profession	Notable films	Ref.
January	1	Arno Liiver	71	Estonia	Actor	Spring; Summer	
January	2	Tim Robertson	81	Australia	Actor	The Eye of the Storm; The Mule	
January	2	Sidney Kibrick	97	US	Actor	Our Gang; Pier 13	
January	4	Sverre Anker Ousdal	81	Norway	Actor	Flight of the Eagle; The Veil of Twilight	
January	5	Ahn Sung-ki	74	South Korea	Actor	Two Cops; Hansan: Rising Dragon	
January	6	John Cunningham	93	US	Actor	Mystic Pizza; Dead Poets Society	
January	6	Saeid Pirdoost	85	Iran	Actor	The Deer; Killing a Traitor	
January	6	Béla Tarr	70	Hungary	Director, Screenwriter	Sátántangó; The Turin Horse	
January	7	Vera Frances	95	UK	Actress	Back-Room Boy; King Arthur Was a Gentleman	
January	8	Guy Moon	63	US	Composer	The Brady Bunch Movie; Out-of-Sync	
January	9	T. K. Carter	69	US	Actor	The Thing; Space Jam	
January	9	Nessa Hyams	84	US	Casting Director	The Exorcist; Blazing Saddles	
January	9	Bill Millar	79	UK	Visual Effects Artist	Close Encounters of the Third Kind; Star Trek: The Motion Picture	
January	11	Thomas Causey	76	US	Sound Mixer	Halloween; Dick Tracy	
January	11	Marcus Gilbert	67	UK	Actor	Rambo III; Army of Darkness	
January	12	Sheila Bernette	94	UK	Actress, Singer	The Magnificent Seven Deadly Sins; My Life in Ruins	
January	12	Catherine Samie	92	France	Actress	Lovers of Paris; The Origin of Violence	
January	14	Donald Douglas	92	UK	Actor	A Bridge Too Far; Bridget Jones	
January	14	Bruce Leung	77	Hong Kong	Actor	Hapkido; Kung Fu Hustle	
January	14	Igor Zolotovitskiy	64	Russia	Actor	Egorka; Love	
January	16	Bruce Bilson	97	US	Director, Assistant Director	The North Avenue Irregulars; Chattanooga Choo Choo	
January	16	Mark Jones	72	US	Director, Screenwriter	Leprechaun; Rumpelstiltskin	
January	17	Roger Allers	76	US	Director, Animator, Storyboard Artist	The Lion King; Open Season	
January	20	Kōzō Shioya	70	Japan	Actor, Voice Actor	NEMO; Dragon Ball Z: Battle of Gods	
January	21	Reza Rooygari	79	Iran	Actor	The Tenants; The Old Bachelor	
January	22	Floyd Vivino	74	US	Actor	Good Morning, Vietnam; Mr. Wonderful	
January	22	Raoul Aragon	78	Philippines	Actor	Sana Maulit Muli; Patrolman	
January	23	Ed Bernard	86	US	Actor	Shaft; Homeward Bound: The Incredible Journey	
January	23	Yvonne Lime	90	US	Actress	I Was a Teenage Werewolf; High School Hellcats	
January	23	Carlo Cecchi	86	Italy	Actor	The Red Violin; Stealing Beauty	
January	29	João Canijo	68	Portugal	Director	Get a Life; Living Bad	
January	29	Kenneth Hyman	97	US	Producer	What Ever Happened to Baby Jane?; The Dirty Dozen	
January	30	Christa Lang	82	Germany	Actress, Producer	What's Up, Doc?; White Dog	
January	30	Catherine O'Hara	71	Canada	Actress, Screenwriter	Beetlejuice; Home Alone	
January	30	Demond Wilson	79	US	Actor	The Organization; Full Moon High	
January	31	Kazuhiko Hasegawa	80	Japan	Director	The Man Who Stole the Sun; The Youth Killer	
January	31	Gerardo Taracena	55	Mexico	Actor	Apocalypto; Man on Fire	
February	1	Fernando Esteso	80	Spain	Actor	Torrente 5: Operación Eurovegas; Uncertain Glory	
February	3	S. P. Venkatesh	70	India	Composer	Kilukkam; Spadikam	
February	4	Tomàs Pladevall	79	Spain	Cinematographer	Train of Shadows; The Pianist	
February	5	Alan Trustman	95	US	Screenwriter	The Thomas Crown Affair; Bullitt	
February	6	Jana Brejchová	86	Czech Republic	Actress	Wolf Trap; Beauty in Trouble	
February	6	John Wheeler	95	US	Actor	Support Your Local Gunfighter; Apollo 13	
February	7	Sunil Thapa	68	Nepal	Actor	Mary Kom; Border	
February	8	Edward Linde-Lubaszenko	86	Poland	Actor	Soldiers of Freedom; Rose	
February	8	Eric Allan	85	UK	Actor	The McKenzie Break; Bleak Moments	
February	9	Giancarlo Dettori	93	Italy	Actor	My Sister in Law; Quattro bravi ragazzi	
February	10	Screaming Mad George	69	Japan, US	Special Effects Artist, Director	Society; Freaked	
February	10	Shelly Desai	90	US	Actor	Thelma & Louise; Here Comes the Boom	
February	11	Bud Cort	77	US	Actor	Harold and Maude; The Life Aquatic with Steve Zissou	
February	11	James Van Der Beek	48	US	Actor	Varsity Blues; The Rules of Attraction	
February	12	Vangie Labalan	83	Philippines	Actress	Mallari; Manila by Night	
February	12	Esa Pakarinen Jr.	78	Finland	Actor	The Year of the Hare; Jon	
February	12	Joe Simon	78	India	Director	Hongkongnalli Agent Amar; Time Bomb	
February	14	Tom Noonan	74	US	Actor, Director, Screenwriter	Manhunter; Heat	
February	15	Pino Colizzi	88	Italy	Actor	Italian Graffiti; Metello	
February	15	Enayatollah Bakhshi	80	Iran	Actor	Mr. Naive; Sattar Khan	
February	15	Robert Duvall	95	US	Actor, Director	The Godfather; Apocalypse Now	
February	16	Jane Baer	91	Canada	Animator	The Black Cauldron; Who Framed Roger Rabbit	
February	16	Linda Seger	80	US	Script Consultant	Romero; Cowboys & Angels	
February	16	Frederick Wiseman	96	US	Documentarian, Film Editor	Titicut Follies; Menus-Plaisirs – Les Troisgros	
February	19	Eric Dane	53	US	Actor	Marley & Me; Bad Boys: Ride or Die	
February	20	Angela Luce	88	Italy	Actress, Singer	The Decameron; The Specialists	
February	21	Raymond Bouchard	80	Canada	Actor	Seducing Doctor Lewis; Bluff	
February	23	Robert Carradine	71	US	Actor	Revenge of the Nerds; The Lizzie McGuire Movie	
February	24	Jeremy Larner	88	US	Screenwriter	Drive, He Said; The Candidate	
February	24	Maria O'Brien	75	US	Actress	Smile; Protocol	
February	25	Bobby J. Brown	62	US	Actor	From Within; My One and Only	
February	25	Natalya Klimova	87	Russia	Actress	The Hyperboloid of Engineer Garin; The Snow Queen	
February	26	Ahmed Nimal	62	Maldive Islands	Actor, Director	Shakku; Hehes	
March	1	Andrew Gunn	56	Canada	Producer	Freaky Friday; Cruella	
March	1	Kenith Trodd	90	UK	Producer	A Month in the Country; Circle of Friends	
March	2	Stephen Hibbert	68	US	Actor, Screenwriter	Pulp Fiction; It's Pat	
March	2	Slava Tsukerman	85	Russia	Director, Screenwriter, Producer	Liquid Sky; Perestroika	
March	3	Robert Hinkle	95	US	Actor, Stuntman, Producer	Giant; Hud	
March	4	Ana Luisa Peluffo	96	Mexico	Actress	Paper Flowers; The Infernal Rapist	
March	5	Jane Lapotaire	81	UK	Actress	Lady Jane; Shooting Fish	
March	5	Corey Parker	60	US	Actor	Friday the 13th: A New Beginning; 9½ Weeks	
March	5	Sandy Wernick	86	US	Producer	Happy Gilmore; The Wedding Singer	
March	6	Antonio Marsina	80	Italy	Actor	Keoma; Vatican Conspiracy	
March	6	Jennifer Runyon	65	US	Actress	Ghostbusters; The Falcon and the Snowman	
March	8	Sam Scarber	76	US	Actor	Against All Odds; Over the Top	
March	9	Tamal Roy Chowdhury	80	India	Actor	Challenge; Bindaas	
March	10	Thakkali Srinivasan	72	India	Director	Jenma Natchathram; Witness	
March	10	Giorgos Panousopoulos	84	Greece	Director, Screenwriter, Cinematographer	Mania; Love Me Not?	
March	10	IJf Blokker	95	Netherlands	Actor	De Fred Haché Show; Zeg 'ns Aaa	
March	11	Wendy Playfair	99	Australia	Actress	Accidents Happen; The Tree	
March	11	Judy Pace	83	US	Actress	The Fortune Cookie; Cotton Comes to Harlem	
March	12	Peeter Simm	73	Estonia	Director	Georg; On the Water	
March	12	Harimurali	27	India	Actor	Rasikan; Amar Akbar Anthony	
March	12	Enrica Bonaccorti	76	Italy	Actress	Your Vice Is a Locked Room and Only I Have the Key; The Precarious Bank Teller	
March	13	John Alford	54	UK	Actor	Mike Bassett: England Manager; The Hatton Garden Job	
March	13	Madhu Malhotra	72	India	Actress	Vishwanath; Satte Pe Satta	
March	13	Eili Sild	82	Estonia	Actress	Devil with a False Passport; Firebird	
March	14	Gemma Cuervo	91	Spain	Actress	Life Goes On; Vente a Alemania, Pepe	
March	14	Lyudmila Arinina	99	Russia	Actress	Waiting for Love; Father	
March	15	Matt Clark	89	US	Actor	In the Heat of the Night; Back to the Future Part III	
March	15	Attila Lőte	91	Hungary	Actor	The Spider Labyrinth; Sunshine	
March	15	Bruno Salomone	55	France	Actor	A Cat in Paris; Madeleine Collins	
March	16	Joan Blackman	87	US	Actress	Blue Hawaii; Kid Galahad	
March	16	Jamie Blanks	54	Australia	Director, Composer, Film Editor	Urban Legend; Valentine	
March	16	Kiki Shepard	74	US	Actress	The Cotton Club; A Rage in Harlem	
March	18	Tom Georgeson	88	UK	Actor	A Fish Called Wanda; Notes on a Scandal	
March	19	Chuck Norris	86	US	Actor	The Way of the Dragon; The Delta Force	
March	20	Nicholas Brendon	54	US	Actor	Demon Island; Coherence	
March	20	Robert Fox	73	UK	Producer	The Hours; Notes on a Scandal	
March	21	Juca de Oliveira	91	Brazil	Actor	Case of the Naves Brothers; The Sign of the City	
March	23	Valerie Perrine	82	US	Actress	Lenny; Superman	
March	24	Esteri Tebandeke	41	Uganda	Actress, Producer, Screenwriter	Queen of Katwe; Imperial Blue	
March	25	Alexander Kluge	94	Germany	Director	Yesterday Girl; Artists Under the Big Top: Perplexed	
March	26	James Tolkan	94	US	Actor	Back to the Future; Top Gun	
March	28	Richard Donat	84	Canada	Actor	The Weight of Water; Amelia	
March	29	Rahul Banerjee	42	India	Actor	Pati Parameshwar; Chotushkone	
March	29	Mary Beth Hurt	79	US	Actress	The World According to Garp; The Age of Innocence	
March	29	David Riondino	73	Italy	Actor, Singer	The Night of the Shooting Stars; To Love the Damned	
March	31	Lili Hinstin	48	France	Festival Programmer	—N/a	
April	2	Dee Freeman	66	US	Actress	Blue Hill Avenue; My Baby's Daddy	
April	3	Michele Massimo Tarantini	83	Italy	Director	La liceale; Seven Hours of Violence	
April	4	Arne Olsen	64	Canada	Screenwriter, Actor	Red Scorpion; Mighty Morphin Power Rangers: The Movie	
April	6	Angela Pleasence	84	UK	Actress	Stealing Heaven; Gangs of New York	
April	10	Sid Krofft	96	Canada	Film producer	Pufnstuf	
April	11	John Nolan	87	UK	Actor	Following; Batman Begins	
April	12	Valerie Lee Shepard	94	US	Actress	The Wizard of Oz; Our Gang	
April	14	Joy Harmon	85	US	Actress	Cool Hand Luke; Angel in My Pocket	
April	14	Aleta Mitchell	74	US	Actress	The Serpent and the Rainbow; Malcolm X	
April	14	Sue Prado	44	Philippines	Actress	Barber's Tales; Quezon	
April	15	Alexander Morton	81	UK	Actor	Get Carter; Silent Scream	
April	16	Jan Potměšil	60	Czech Republic	Actor	Princess Jasnenka and the Flying Shoemaker; Bony a klid	
April	17	Nathalie Baye	77	France	Actress	Every Man for Himself; Catch Me If You Can	
April	17	Mariclare Costello	90	US	Actress	Let's Scare Jessica to Death; Ordinary People	
April	17	Nadia Farès	57	France	Actress	The Crimson Rivers; Storm Warning	
April	19	Patrick Muldoon	57	US	Actor, Producer	Starship Troopers; The Card Counter	
April	20	Luis Brandoni	86	Argentina	Actor	The Truce; State of Reality	
April	21	Luis Puenzo	80	Argentina	Director, Screenwriter	The Official Story; Old Gringo	
April	22	Dean Tavoularis	93	US	Production Designer	The Godfather; Apocalypse Now	
April	23	Michael Beint	100	UK	Actor	Witchfinder General; Elizabeth	
April	24	Benoît Rousseau	66	Canada	Actor	Octobre; Machine Gun Molly	
April	24	Beau Starr	81	US	Actor	Halloween; Goodfellas	
April	25	Matt DeCaro	70	US	Actor	Richie Rich; The Wise Kids	
April	25	Abbe Lane	93	US	Actress, Singer	Ride Clear of Diablo; Twilight Zone: The Movie	
April	26	Dion Anderson	87	US	Actor	Dying Young; The Shawshank Redemption	
April	26	Adolfo Aristarain	82	Argentina, Spain	Director, Screenwriter	A Place in the World; Martín (Hache)	
April	27	Steve Maslow	81	US	Sound Mixer	The Empire Strikes Back; Raiders of the Lost Ark	
April	29	Claire Nielson	89	UK	Actress	The Wild Affair; Kidnapped	
April	30	Antoinette Bower	93	US	Actress	Prom Night; Club Paradise	
April	30	Gary Lydon	61	Ireland	Actor	Brooklyn; The Banshees of Inisherin	
May	2	José María Cruz Novillo	89	Spain	Poster Artist	The Spirit of the Beehive; La prima Angélica	
May	3	Claire Maurier	97	France	Actress	La Cage aux Folles; Amélie	
May	4	Yuji Ohno	84	Japan	Composer	The Inugami Family; Lupin the Third	
May	5	Santhosh K. Nayar	68	India	Actor	Cousins; Aarattu	
May	5	R. B. Choudary	77	India	Producer	Pudhu Vasantham; Aanandham	
May	6	Kenji Ohba	71	Japan	Actor	Battle Royale II: Requiem; Kill Bill: The Whole Bloody Affair	
May	7	Michael Pennington	82	UK	Actor	Hamlet; Return of the Jedi	
May	9	Mark Smythe	53	New Zealand	Composer	Boar; The Reef: Stalked	
May	10	Anja Breien	85	Norway	Director	Rape; Arven	
May	10	Günther Maria Halmer	83	Germany	Actor	Gandhi; Sophie's Choice	
May	12	Jack Taylor	99	US	Actor	Cleopatra; The Ninth Gate	
May	12	Barry W. Blaustein	71	US	Screenwriter, Director	Coming to America; Beyond the Mat	
May	12	Donald Gibb	71	US	Actor	Revenge of the Nerds; U.S. Marshals	
May	12	Stanisława Celińska	79	Poland	Actress	The Maids of Wilko; Katyń	
May	14	Claudine Longet	84	France	Singer, Actress	The Party; McHale's Navy	
May	14	Krzysztof Piesiewicz	80	Poland	Screenwriter	Three Colours; The Double Life of Veronique	
May	16	E. J. Peaker	82	US	Actress	Hello, Dolly!; Graduation Day	
May	17	K. Rajan	85	India	Producer	Michael Raj; Bakasuran	
May	18	Tom Kane	64	US	Voice Actor	The Powerpuff Girls Movie; Star Wars	
May	18	Caitlin O'Heaney	73	US	Actress	He Knows You're Alone; The Emperor's Club	
May	20	Kent Broadhurst	86	US	Actor	The Verdict; Silkwood	
May	20	George Eastman	83	Italy	Actor, Screenwriter	Antropophagus; Fellini Satyricon	
May	21	Peter Helm	84	Canada	Actor	The Longest Day; The Andromeda Strain	
May	22	Grizz Chapman	52	US	Actor	The Cobbler; Money Monster	
May	22	Charles Cioffi	90	US	Actor	Klute; Missing	
May	23	Thérèse Liotard	80	France	Actress	One Sings, the Other Doesn't; No Scandal	
May	23	Albert Wolsky	95	US	Costume Designer	All That Jazz; Birdman	
May	24	Beverly Afaglo	42	Ghana	Actress	The Game; Sidechic Gang	
May	24	Zeudi Araya	75	Eritrea	Actress, Producer	The Off-Road Girl; Control	
May	25	Brian Johnson	86	UK	Visual Effects Artist	Alien; The Empire Strikes Back	
May	25	Yoshihiro Nishimura	59	Japan	Director, Make-Up Artist	Tokyo Gore Police; Mutant Girls Squad	
May	26	William Smithers	98	US	Actor	Attack; Papillon	
May	26	Howard Storm	94	US	Actor, Director	Bananas; Once Bitten	
May	27	Owain Rhys Davies	44	UK	Actor	Alice Through the Looking Glass; A Serial Killer's Guide to Life	
May	27	Anik Dutta	66	India	Director	Bhobishyoter Bhoot; Aparajito	
May	27	Marcia Lucas	80	US	Film Editor	Taxi Driver; Star Wars	
May	28	Anjanette Comer	86	US	Actress	The Loved One; The Baby	
May	30	Kelly Curtis	69	US	Actress	Trading Places; The Devil's Daughter	
June	1	Anthony Head	72	UK	Actor	I'll Be There; Imagine Me & You	
June	1	Wei Zongwan	87	China	Actor	San Mao Joins the Army; 1911	
June	1	Knut Husebø	80	Norway	Visual Artist, Actor	Life and Death; Julia Julia	
June	2	Guts Ishimatsu	76	Japan	Actor, Comedian	Empire of the Sun; Black Rain	
June	2	Giorgia Moll	88	Italy	Actress	Contempt; Lipstick	
June	3	James Handy	81	US	Actor	Arachnophobia; Top Gun: Maverick	
June	3	Max Kleven	92	US	Second Unit Director, Stuntman, Actor	Back to the Future; Batman Returns	
June	4	Patrick Godfrey	93	UK	Actor	Ever After; The Count of Monte Cristo	
June	4	Marjane Satrapi	56	Iran-France	Director, Screenwriter	Persepolis; Chicken with Plums	
June	4	Chunchuna Villafañe	92	Argentina	Actress	The Official Story; Private Lives	
June	5	David Sheiner	98	US	Actor	The Odd Couple; Blue Thunder	
June	6	Anthony Guidera	65	US	Actor	The Godfather Part III; Species	
June	6	Julio Jung	84	Chile	Actor	Amnesia; The Dancer and the Thief	
June	6	Salim Kumar	56	India	Actor	Kalyanaraman; Adaminte Makan Abu	
June	8	Michael Preston	93	UK	Actor, Singer	Mad Max 2; Metalstorm: The Destruction of Jared-Syn	
June	9	Sophie Faucher	68	Canada	Actress	Far Side of the Moon; Laurence Anyways	
June	9	Tamao Nakamura	86	Japan	Actress	Conflagration; The Human Condition III: A Soldier's Prayer	
June	10	Lyudmila Chursina	84	Russia	Actress	When the Trees Were Tall; Orlova and Alexandrov	
June	11	Margaret Kerry	97	US	Actress	If You Knew Susie; Peter Pan	
June	12	Ronnie Schell	94	US	Actor, Comedian	The Cat from Outer Space; Love at First Bite	
June	12	Pauls Butkēvičs	85	Latvia	Actor	Incident at Map Grid 36-80; The Hounds of Riga	
June	14	Anne Schedeen	77	US	Actress	Embryo; Second Thoughts	
June	15	Christian Bujeau	81	France	Actor	L'Homme idéal; Return of the Hero	
June	16	Daveigh Chase	35	US	Actress	Lilo & Stitch; The Ring	
June	17	Tom Dreesen	86	US	Actor, Comedian	Spaceballs; Trouble with the Curve	
June	20	Michael Byrne	82	UK	Actor	Indiana Jones and the Last Crusade; Braveheart	
June	20	Akihiro Miwa	91	Japan	Actor, Singer	Princess Mononoke; Howl's Moving Castle	
June	21	Jeff Olson	77	US	Visual Effects Artist	Who Framed Roger Rabbit; Back to the Future Part III	
June	22	Joby Baker	92	Canada	Actor	Girl Happy; Blackbeard's Ghost	
June	22	Mikhail Nozhkin	89	Russia	Actor	The Secret Agent's Blunder; The Detached Mission	
June	24	Ann Blyth	98	US	Actress, Singer	Mildred Pierce; Brute Force	
June	24	Charlie Nelson	72	France	Actor	On Guard; A Difficult Year	
June	26	Kadir İnanır	77	Turkey	Actor	A Sip of Love; Commissar Shakespeare	
June	26	Tom Ligon	85	US	Actor	Paint Your Wagon; Bang the Drum Slowly	
June	27	Anna Dawson	88	UK	Actress, Singer	O Lucky Man!; Bloodbath at the House of Death	
June	28	Alla Chernova	82	Russia	Actress	Don't Forget... Lugovaya Station; Secret of the Blackbirds	
June	29	Penelope Keith	86	UK	Actress	Penny Gold; Priest of Love	
July	1	Moritz Borman	71	Germany	Producer	Terminator; World Trade Center	
July	1	Iossif Surchadzhiev	81	Bulgaria	Actor	Wrathful Journey; Women Do Cry	
July	2	Kjell Nilsson	76	Sweden	Actor	Mad Max 2; The Pirate Movie	
July	3	Carter DeHaven	94	US	Producer	Hoosiers; The Exorcist III	
July	3	Zrinko Ogresta	67	Croatia	Director, Screenwriter	Red Dust; Behind the Glass	
July	4	Slaine Kelly	43	Ireland	Actress	Psychosis; Comedown	
July	6	Louise Lasser	87	US	Actress	Bananas; Happiness	
July	6	Nitzan Gilady	56	Israel	Director	In Satmar Custody; Wedding Doll	
July	7	Marc Messier	78	Canada	Actor	Jesus of Montreal; Bluff	
July	7	Joanna Pettet	83	UK	Actress	The Night of the Generals; Casino Royale	
July	9	Barbara Ling	73	US	Production Designer	Once Upon a Time in Hollywood; Michael	
July	9	Peter Van Norden	75	US	Actor	The Accused; The Naked Gun 2½: The Smell of Fear	
July	10	Wai Ching Ho	82	Hong Kong	Actress	Hustlers; Turning Red	
July	10	Bharathiraja	84	India	Director, Actor	16 Vayathinile; Muthal Mariyathai	
July	12	Scott Bryce	68	US	Actor	Lethal Weapon 3; Up Close & Personal	
July	13	Sam Neill	78	New Zealand	Actor	Jurassic Park; The Piano	
July	13	Nansun Shi	74	Hong Kong	Producer	Infernal Affairs; The Thousand Faces of Dunjia	
July	14	Margarita Andrey	99	Spain	Actress	Devil's Roundup; Radio Stories	
July	14	William Wisher Jr.	71	US	Screenwriter, Actor, Producer	Terminator; The 13th Warrior	
July	15	John Kirby	75	US	Actor, Acting Coach	Frequency; The Count of Monte Cristo	
July	15	Hal Williams	91	US	Actor	Private Benjamin; Guess Who	
July	15	Seputla Sebogodi	63	South Africa	Actor	Mr. Bones; The Woman King	
July	16	Brenda Fricker	81	Ireland	Actress	My Left Foot; Home Alone 2: Lost in New York	
July	16	Patrick Tse	89	Hong Kong	Actor, Director, Producer	Shaolin Soccer; Time	
July	18	Terence Donovan	90	Australia	Actor	Breaker Morant; The Man from Snowy River	
July	20	Zale Parry	93	US	Actress	Underwater Warrior; Tillamook Treasure	
July	21	Kaylee Hottle	18	US	Actress	Godzilla vs. Kong; Godzilla x Kong: The New Empire	
July	21	Olivera Katarina	86	Serbia	Singer, Actress	I Even Met Happy Gypsies; Tears for Sale	
July	22	Chuck Russell	74	US	Director, Screenwriter, Producer	A Nightmare on Elm Street 3: Dream Warriors; The Mask	
July	22	James Sloyan	85	US	Actor	The Sting; Xanadu	
July	23	Hope Clarke	85	US	Actress	Basquiat; Rustin	
July	23	William Orbit	69	UK	Composer	Youngblood; Hotshot	
July	24	Akbar Abdi	65	Iran	Actor	Mother; The Actor	
July	27	Johannes Krisch	59	Austria	Actor	Revanche; In the Fade	
July	27	Phyllida Law	94	UK	Actress	Much Ado About Nothing; Nanny McPhee	
July	29	Glen Hansard	56	Ireland	Actor, Songwriter	The Commitments; Once	
July	29	Scott Hylands	83	Canada	Actor	Death Hunt; Beyond the Black Rainbow	
July	30	Manolo Solo	62	Spain	Actor	The Fury of a Patient Man; Close Your Eyes	
July	30	Iga Cembrzyńska	87	Poland	Actress	The Saragossa Manuscript; Siekierezada	
August	1	Vincent Pastore	80	US	Actor	Mickey Blue Eyes; Shark Tale	
August	3	Grace Chang	93	Hong Kong	Actress	Soldier of Fortune; The Wild, Wild Rose	
August	3	Jon Cypher	94	US	Actor, Singer	Valdez Is Coming; Masters of the Universe	
August	5	Jean Lodge	99	UK	Actress	The Black Knight; Invasion	
August	5	Didier Decoin	81	France	Screenwriter	I as in Icarus; Out of Life	
August	5	Tedde Moore	79	Canada	Actress	A Christmas Story; Murder by Decree	
August	6	Peter Faber	82	Netherlands	Actor	A Bridge Too Far; Soldier of Orange	
August	7	Dominique Frot	68	France	Actress	Inside; Titane	
August	7	Keiko Kishi	93	Japan	Actress	Kwaidan; The Twilight Samurai	
August	9	Reggie Bannister	80	US	Actor, Producer	Phantasm; Bubba Ho-Tep	
August	9	Ben Jones	84	US	Actor	Handgun; Primary Colors	
August	11	John Irvin	86	UK	Director	Raw Deal; Hamburger Hill	
August	11	Fiorenza Marchegiani	73	Italy	Actress	I'm Starting from Three; D'Annunzio	
August	12	R. J. Kizer	73	US	Director, Film Editor, Sound Editor	Godzilla 1985; Reality Bites	
August	13	Bill Kerby	88	US	Screenwriter	Hooper; The Rose	
August	13	Mark Rydell	97	US	Director, Actor	On Golden Pond; The River	
August	15	Peggy Webber	100	US	Actress	Macbeth; The Wrong Man	
August	16	Nick Glennie-Smith	74	UK	Composer, Conductor	The Rock; We Were Soldiers	
August	16	Hayden Panettiere	36	US	Actress	A Bug's Life; Ice Princess	
August	17	Nicolas Altmayer	61	France	Producer	OSS 117: Cairo, Nest of Spies; Alpha	
August	17	Laura Cardoso	98	Brazil	Actress	Felicidade; A Grande Família	
August	18	Fulvio Lucisano	98	Italy	Producer	Notte prima degli esami; Planet of the Vampires	
August	19	Bérangère Bonvoisin	73	France	Actress	No Trifling with Love; The Adolescent	
August	19	Michael Wright	70	US	Actor	Streamers; The Five Heartbeats	
August	20	Bunny Levine	97	US	Actress	La La Land; Thelma	
August	21	Sowcar Janaki	94	India	Actress	Puthiya Paravai; Devi	
August	21	Imam Tantowi	80	Indonesia	Director, Screenwriter	Soerabaia 45; Fatahillah	
August	22	Shelley Fabares	82	US	Actress, Singer	Girl Happy; Spinout	
August	23	James Lew	73	US	Stuntman, Actor	Traffic; Frankenstein	
August	23	René Malo	84	Canada	Producer	The Decline of the American Empire; Internal Affairs	
August	25	Tim Curry	80	UK	Actor, Singer	The Rocky Horror Picture Show; Clue	
August	25	Dolly Parton	80	US	Singer, Actress	9 to 5; Steel Magnolias	
August	26	Peter Cullen	85	Canada	Voice Actor	Winnie the Pooh; Transformers	
August	26	Samuel Monroe Jr.	52	US	Actor	Menace II Society; Set It Off	
August	30	Francesc Garrido	56	Spain	Actor	Smoking Room; The Sea Inside	
August	30	Victor Miller	86	US	Writer	Friday the 13th; A Stranger Is Watching	
September	1	Jean-Paul Rappeneau	94	France	Director, Screenwriter	Cyrano de Bergerac; The Horseman on the Roof	
September	2	Lau Siu Ming	94	Hong Kong	Actor	The Butterfly Murders; A Chinese Ghost Story	
September	2	Gracindo Júnior	83	Brazil	Actor	The Emerald Forest; The Forest	
September	4	Richard O'Sullivan	82	UK	Actor	Cleopatra; The Young Ones	
September	5	Georgina Lightning	63	Canada	Actress, Director, Producer	Older than America; Die My Love	
September	5	Michael Mendl	82	Germany	Actor	Amen.; Downfall	
September	5	Erni Mangold	99	Austria	Actress	Eva; Before Sunrise	
September	6	Nina Shipman	88	US	Actress	Blue Denim; High Time	
September	9	Elio Zamuto	85	Italy	Actor	Shadows Unseen; Shoot First, Die Later	
September	9	Arvo Kruusement	85	Estonia	Director	Summer; Autumn	
September	11	Jeremy Thomas	77	UK	Producer	The Last Emperor; Only Lovers Left Alive	
September	12	George Chuvalo	89	Canada	Actor	The Fly; Prom Night III: The Last Kiss	
September	13	Rodney Charters	80	New Zealand	Cinematographer	Sleepwalkers; Going in Style	
September	14	Bob Mackie	87	US	Costume Designer	Lady Sings the Blues; Pennies from Heaven	
September	14	Ralf Richter	69	Germany	Actor	Bang Boom Bang; The Cat	
September	15	Gerrit Graham	76	US	Actor, Songwriter	Phantom of the Paradise; Used Cars	
September	15	Patricio Guzmán	85	Chile	Documentary Director	The Battle of Chile; The Cordillera of Dreams	
September	16	Olu Jacobs	84	Nigeria	Actor	Baby: Secret of the Lost Legend; Pirates	
September	18	Richard Harrison	90	US	Actor	Secret Agent Fireball; His Name Was King	
September	18	Eugenio Zanetti	79	Argentina	Production Designer	Restoration; What Dreams May Come	
September	19	Elliot Graham	50	US	Film Editor	Milk; No Time to Die	
September	20	Sid Ahmed Agoumi	85	Algeria	Actor	Z; Black Really Suits You	
September	24	You Benchang	93	China	Actor	The University Days of a Dog; The Fox Lover	
September	24	Jacob Goldwasser	76	Israel	Director	Beyond the Sea; Laces	
September	24	Marina Vlady	88	France	Actress	Two or Three Things I Know About Her; Chimes at Midnight	
September	25	Ryszard Lenczewski	78	Poland	Cinematographer	Ida; My Summer of Love	
September	27	Dennis Haskins	75	US	Actor	Max Keeble's Big Move; A Million Ways to Die in the West	
September	28	Anne Claire Poirier	94	Canada	Director	Before the Time Comes; Beyond Forty	
September	28	John Grover	87	UK	Film Editor	James Bond; Labyrinth	
September	29	Gonzalo Suárez	92	Spain	Director, Screenwriter	Rowing with the Wind; The Detective and Death	
October	1	J. Todd Anderson	67	US	Storyboard Artist, Actor	Fargo; The Big Lebowski	
October	1	Mary Louise Weller	79	US	Actress	Animal House; Q	
October	2	Matthew Posey	68	US	Actor	No Country for Old Men; The Magnificent Seven	
October	3	Singeetham Srinivasa Rao	95	India	Director, Screenwriter	Aditya 369; Pushpaka Vimana	
October	5	George Fenton	76	UK	Composer	Gandhi; The Fisher King	
October	6	Eva Marie Saint	102	US	Actress	On the Waterfront; North by Northwest	
October	8	Betty McGuire	100	US	Actress	Coma; Up in Smoke	
October	11	Jiří Štěpnička	79	Czech Republic	Actor	How Poets Are Losing Their Illusions; In the Shadow	
October	11	Hiroshi Tsuchida	54	Japan	Actor, Voice Actor	Cars; Warcraft	
October	12	Giorgio Bracardi	93	Italy	Actor	Banana Joe; Being Twenty	
October	12	RJ Mitte	34	US	Actor	Standing Up for Sunny; Westhampton	
October	12	Lucian Piane	46	US	Composer, Record Producer	Another Gay Sequel: Gays Gone Wild!; Sorority Row	
October	12	Gary Waddell	74	Australia	Actor	Chopper; The Proposition	
October	13	Michael Forest	97	US	Actor	The Message; Cast Away	
October	13	Alan Mandell	98	Canada	Actor	A Serious Man; Velvet Buzzsaw	
October	15	Richard Riehle	78	US	Actor	Casino; Office Space	
October	17	Michèle Magny	82	Canada	Actress	Don't Let the Angels Fall; The Disappearance	
October	19	Kenneth Atchity	82	US	Producer	The Meg; Meg 2: The Trench	
October	21	Elena Maganini	70	US	Film Editor	Henry: Portrait of a Serial Killer; Wild Things	
October	21	Tom Skerritt	93	US	Actor	Alien; Top Gun	
October	23	Fedir Stryhun	86	Ukraine	Actor	The Lost Letter; The Guide	
October	25	Peggy King	96	US	Actress, Singer	Abbott and Costello Meet the Mummy; Zero Hour!	
October	25	José Luis García Sánchez	85	Spain	Director, Screenwriter	Trout; Divine Words	
October	25	Eric Bauza	46	Canada	Voice Actor	The Day the Earth Blew Up; Coyote vs. Acme	
October	25	Walter Koenig	90	US	Actor	Star Trek; Moontrap	
October	26	Susan Saint James	80	US	Actress	Where Angels Go, Trouble Follows; Love at First Bite	
October	27	Peter Medak	88	Hungary	Director	The Changeling; The Krays	
October	28	Barbara Barrie	95	US	Actress	One Potato, Two Potato; Breaking Away	
October	28	Elke Sommer	85	Germany	Actress	The Prize; A Shot in the Dark	
October	28	Patrick Stewart	86	UK	Actor	Star Trek; X-Men	
October	30	JoBe Cerny	78	US	Actor	Novocaine; Road to Perdition	
October	30	Sanjay Gupta	59	India	Director	Kaabil; Jazbaa	
October	31	Martin Erlichman	97	US	Producer	Coma; Breathless	
November	1	Ate Gay	55	Philippines	Comedian, Actor, Singer	Enteng Kabisote 10 and the Abangers; Ayuda Babes	
November	4	Tinto Brass	93	Italy	Director, Screenwriter	Salon Kitty; Caligula	
November	4	Donnie Dunagan	92	US	Actor	Tower of London; Bambi	
November	4	Toukie Smith	74	US	Actress	I Like It Like That; The Preacher's Wife	
November	6	Dawn Greenhalgh	93	Canada	Actress	The Virgin Suicides; Maps to the Stars	
November	6	Sebastián Lelio	52	Chile	Director, Screenwriter	Gloria; A Fantastic Woman	
November	8	Skip Hinnant	86	US	Comedian, Actor, Singer	Fritz the Cat; The Nine Lives of Fritz the Cat	
November	10	Irma P. Hall	91	US	Actress	Patch Adams; The Ladykillers	
November	10	Stacy Keach	85	US	Actor	American History X; Nebraska	
November	11	Regina Torné	82	Mexico	Actress	The Big Cube; Like Water for Chocolate	
November	14	Giri Babu	83	India	Actor, Director	Kurukshetram; Nee Sukhame Ne Koruthunna	
November	17	Lance Broadway	43	US	Actor	Olympus Has Fallen; Teleios	
November	18	Larry Poindexter	66	US	Actor	S.W.A.T.; 17 Again	
November	19	E.J. Carroll	66	US	Actor	The Wrestler; Everybody's Fine	

== Film debuts ==
- Amaia – Bitter Christmas
- Lance Archer – Disclosure Day
- Brian Cage – Disclosure Day
- Owen Cooper – Wuthering Heights
- Carlos González – An Island Away From You
- Guitarricadelafuente – La bola negra
- Jaafar Jackson – Michael
- Markiplier – Iron Lung
- Milo Quifes – La bola negra
- Ruslana Panchyshyna – On Fire
- Orville Peck – Street Fighter
- Helen J. Shen – The Devil Wears Prada 2
