= List of Soviet films of 1969 =

A list of films produced in the Soviet Union in 1969 (see 1969 in film).

== 1969 ==
Title	Russian title	Director	Cast	Genre	Notes
1969
Adam and Eve	Адам и Хева	Alexey Korenev	Frunzik Mkrtchyan	Comedy	
The Adjutant of His Excellency	Адъютант его превосходительства	Yevgeni Tashkov	Yuri Solomin, Vladislav Strzhelchik, Igor Starygin	War drama	
The Ambassador of the Soviet Union	Посол Советского Союза	Georgy Natanson	Yuliya Borisova	Drama	
Barbara the Fair with the Silken Hair	Варвара-краса, длинная коса	Alexander Rou	Mikhail Pugovkin, Georgy Millyar, Anatoly Kubatsky, Aleksei Katyshev, Sergei Nikolaev, Tatiana Klyueva	Fantasy	
The Bremen Town Musicians	Бременские музыканты	Inessa Kovalevskaya	Elmira Zherzdeva, Oleg Anofriev, Anatoliy Gorokhov	Animation	
The Brothers Karamazov	Братья Карамазовы	Kirill Lavrov, Ivan Pyryev, Mikhail Ulyanov	Mikhail Ulyanov, Lionella Pyryeva, Kirill Lavrov, Andrey Myagkov	Drama	Entered into the 6th Moscow International Film Festival and nominated for the Best Foreign Language Film Oscar
By the Lake	У озера	Sergei Gerasimov	Oleg Zhakov, Vasily Shukshin, Natalya Belokhvostikova	Drama	USSR State Prize, 1971
The Color of Pomegranates	Цвет граната	Sergei Parajanov	Sofiko Chiaureli, Melkon Aleksanyan, Vilen Galstyan	Biopic, experimental	Armenian Language
Dangerous Tour	Опасные гастроли	Georgi Yungvald-Khilkevich	Vladimir Vysotsky, Yefim Kopelyan, Nikolai Grinko, Ivan Pereverzev	Action, history	
Director	Директор	Alexey Saltykov	Nikolay Gubenko	Drama	
Don't Grieve	Не горюй!	Georgi Daneliya	Sergo Zakariadze, Vakhtang Kikabidze, Sofiko Chiaureli, Anastasiya Vertinskaya, Veriko Anjaparidze	Comedy, Musical	
Family Happiness	Семейное счастье	Andrey Ladynin, Aleksandr Sheyn Sr. and Sergei Solovyov	Alisa Freindlikh	Comedy	
Gena the Crocodile	Крокодил Гена	Roman Abelevich Kachanov	Vasily Livanov, Klara Rumyanova	Animation	
King Stag	Король-олень	Pavel Arsenov	Yury Yakovlev	Musical	
The Lanfier Colony	Колония Ланфиер	Jan Schmidt	Juozas Budraitis, Zuzana Kocúriková, Václav Neckář, Michal Docolomanský	Drama	Czech-Soviet co-production, entered into the 6th Moscow International Film Festival
Mama Married	Мама вышла замуж	Vitaly Melnikov	Lyusyena Ovchinnikova	Drama	
13 PM	В тринадцатом часу ночи	Larisa Shepitko	Vladimir Basov, Georgy Vitsin, Zinovy Gerdt, Spartak Mishulin, Anatoly Papanov	Comedy, Musical	
A Nest of Gentry	Дворянское гнездо	Andrey Konchalovsky	Irina Kupchenko	Drama	
Not Under the Jurisdiction	Неподсуден	Vladimir Krasnopolsky, Valeri Uskov	Oleg Strizhenov	Drama	
On the Way to Berlin	На пути в Берлин	Mikhail Yershov	Vasiliy Krasnov	Drama	
Prince Igor	Князь Игорь	Roman Tikhomirov	Boris Khmelnitsky		
The Red Tent	Красная палатка	Mikhail Kalatozov	Sean Connery, Claudia Cardinale, Peter Finch, Nikita Mikhalkov, Yuri Vizbor, Donatas Banionis	Drama, action	
Spring	Весна	Arvo Kruusement	Arno Liiver, Riina Hein, Aare Laanemets	Drama	
Strange People	Странные люди	Vasily Shukshin	Vsevolod Sanayev	Drama	
Subject for a Short Story	Сюжет для небольшого рассказа	Sergei Yutkevich	Nikolai Grinko	Drama	Soviet-French co-production
Tomorrow, on April 3rd...	Завтра, третьего апреля…	Igor Maslennikov	Eneken Aksel	Comedy	
Village Detective	Дepeвeнский дeтeктив	Ivan Lukinsky	Mikhail Zharov, Tatyana Pelttser, Natalya Sayko, Lidiya Smirnova	Comedy, crime	Won the Prize at the All-Union Film Festival in Minsk
Viimne reliikvia	Последняя реликвия	Grigori Kromanov	Aleksandr Goloborodko, Ingrīda Andriņa	History, action	
White Sun of the Desert	Белое солнце пустыни	Vladimir Motyl	Anatoly Kuznetsov, Spartak Mishulin, Pavel Luspekaev	Eastern	
Winnie-the-Pooh	Винни-Пух	Fyodor Khitruk	Vladimir Osenev, Yevgeny Leonov, Iya Savvina	Animation	
