= Cinema of Estonia =

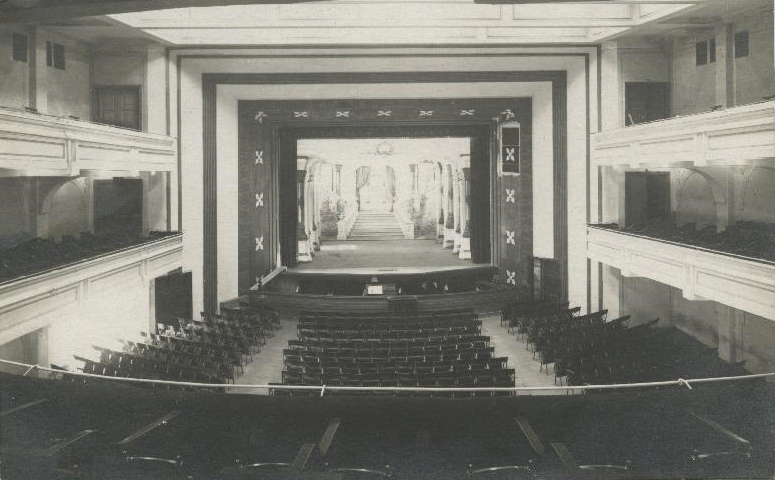
- Cinema Grand Marina (Tallinn, 1920-1935)
- No. of screens: 74 (2010)
  - Per capita: 6.3 per 100,000 (2010)
- Main distributors: Forum Cinemas AS 54.0% Acme Film OÜ 36.0% Kuukulgur Film OÜ 4.0%

Produced feature films (2011)
- Fictional: 8 (61.5%)
- Animated: 1 (7.7%)
- Documentary: 4 (30.8%)

Number of admissions (2011)
- Total: 2,346,000
  - Per capita: 1.96 (2012)
- National films: 236,000 (10.1%)

Gross box office (2011)
- Total: €9.17 million
- National films: €472,000 (5.1%)

Cinema of Estonia is the film industry of the Republic of Estonia. The motion pictures have won international awards and each year new Estonian films are seen at film festivals around the globe.

== 1896—1911 ==
The first "moving pictures" were screened in Tallinn in 1896. The first movie theater was opened in 1908. The first local documentary was made in 1908 with the production of a newsreel about Swedish King Gustav V’s visit to Tallinn.

== 1912—1918 ==
Karujaht Pärnumaal, Estonia Film

The first Estonian documentary was created by Johannes Pääsuke in 1912 that was followed by a short film Karujaht Pärnumaal (Bear Hunt in Pärnumaa) in 1914. The first movie studio in Estonia, Estonia Film Tartus (The Tartu Studio of Estonia Film), was established by Johannes Pääsuke (1892–1918). Pääsuke produced documentaries, short films and pictures of Estonian nature for the Estonian National Museum. Karujaht Pärnumaal (Bear-Hunt in Pärnu County, 1914) was the first fictional short film made in Estonia. In total, eight films made by J. Pääsuke have survived and are stored at the Estonian Film Archives.

== 1918—1940 ==
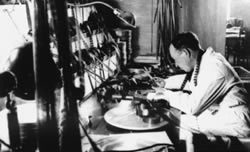
Konstantin Märska at the Estonian Culture Film in 1936

The first full-length feature film was made in 1924 Shadow of the Past directed by Konstantin Märska and produced by his Konstantin Märska Filmiproduktsioon (Konstantin Märska Film Production). Two feature films by Märska have survived: Vigased pruudid (1929) and Jüri Rumm (1929). Theodor Lutsu Filmiproduktsioon (the Film Production of Theodor Luts Studio) was established by Theodor Luts and his wife Aksella Luts, who produced documentaries and feature films. His Noored kotkad (Young Eagles) (1927) is generally regarded as the cornerstone of Estonian cinema. Luts was also responsible for directing the only Estonian sound feature made before Soviet era, an Estonian-Finnish co-production Päikese lapsed (1932). Luts moved to Finland to work as a cinematographer immediately after finishing the film, and never returned to Estonia. Smaller film production studios in Estonia included Siirius Film and K.Kalamees Tartu.

The major film production company after the Great Depression hit Estonia during the 1930s was state subsidized the Estonian Culture Film (Estonian: Eesti Kultuurfilm) that produced mostly documentaries.
In late 1930s, Academy Award nominated Miliza Korjus best known for a role in The Great Waltz (1938), daughter of an Estonian lieutenant colonel in the Imperial Russian Army and later Chief of Staff to the War Minister of Estonia, had a successful career in Hollywood film industry

The first Estonian animated short film Kutsu-Juku seiklusi was made in 1931.

== 1940—1953 ==
During the first year of Soviet occupation (1940–1941) Eesti Kultuurfilm was taken over by the Communist Party and renamed Kinokroonika Eesti Stuudio (the Estonian Newsreel Studio). During the first decades of Soviet rule as Estonia became a part of USSR in 1944 after the end of World War II, filmmakers in Estonia were mostly coming from inner Soviet Union whose job was to create propaganda films that depicted the victory of socialism in a form of newsreels and documentaries like the newsreel "Soviet Estonia" (1950) created by Semyon Semyonovich Shkolnikov, Vladimir Tomberg, and others.

Former Eesti Kultuurfilm was called Kinokroonika Tallinna Stuudio (The Tallinn Newsreel Studio) in 1942 during the German occupation in World War II and Tallinna Kinostuudio (The Tallinn Film Studio) in 1947 again by the Soviets.

During the era two feature films on Soviet themes were produced in Estonia directed by Gerbert Rappaport, an Austrian émigré in Soviet Union: Elu tsitadellis (Life in the Citadel) in 1947, Valgus Koordis (Light in Koordi) in 1951 that was the first color motion picture film made in Estonia.

== 1953—1991 ==
After the death of Stalin in 1953 a more liberal period in Soviet Union's cultural policies followed. Filmmakers started to enjoy greater artistic control at the same time the Soviet State Committee for Cinematography (Goskino) in Moscow provided the money, state censorship body Glavlit and CPSU Department of Culture had the control over releasing the movies.

The Tallinn Film Studio was renamed Kunstiliste ja Kroonikafilmide Tallinna Kinostuudio (Tallinn Feature- and Newsreel Film Studio) in 1954 and in 1963 was renamed again Tallinnfilm

Some of the first films produced during the era that were co directed by an Estonian Kaljo Kiisk were Juunikuu päevad (1957) and Vallatud kurvid also known as Opasniye Povoroty, the first dramatic film shot in Kinopanorama (1959).

In the 1960s a story of Prince Gabriel by Estonian writer Eduard Bornhöhe was turned into a movie script by Arvo Valton. Grigori Kromanov was named to be the director of Viimne reliikvia (The Last Relic), released in 1969 by Tallinnfilm. The movie set the absolute box office record for the entire Soviet Union at the time by selling 44,9 million tickets. It was successfully distributed by the Soviet film export internationally in more than 60 countries. The film also influenced Estonian literature: 2 short stories listed for the Friedebert Tuglas award in 1970-75 included references to the Last Relic.

Another milestone in Estonian Cinema released in 1969 was Arvo Kruusement's Kevade (Spring) based on Oskar Luts popular novel.

Successful films in the 1980s were "Hukkunud Alpinisti" hotell (Dead Mountaineer's Hotel) by Kromanov and movies made by Kaljo Kiisk such as Nipernaadi (1983).

The most prominent female director Leida Laius who emerged during the era is best known for her Kõrboja peremees (1979) and Naerata ometi (1985) receiving at the Berlin International Film Festival UNICEF Award in 1985. Peeter Simm's best known Soviet era film is Ideaalmaastik (The Ideal Landscape) released in 1980. Peeter Urbla's Ma pole turist, ma elan siin (I'm Not a Tourist, I'm Living Here) (1988). Jaan Kolberg emerged by the end of Soviet era with films See kadunud tee (1990) (The Lost Way) and Võlausaldajad (Creditors) (1992)

Among the leading Estonian film actors during the Soviet era were Rein Aren with about 30 roles, Jüri Järvet and Leonhard Merzin.

== Since 1991 ==
After the collapse of the Soviet Union Estonia regained its independence, the cost of filmmaking skyrocketed and the 1990s showed decline in filmmaking that reached its bottom in 1996, the year when no fictional films and only 2 documentaries Lipule... güüsile... valvel! and Turvalisuse illusioon were made in Estonia.

In 1997, the Estonian Film Foundation was founded by the Estonian Ministry of Culture. Production of Minu Leninid (All My Lenins) (1997) a parody of Soviet Revolution by Hardi Volmer marked a turnaround for Estonian feature films. In 1998, there were two feature films produced. Georgica directed by Sulev Keedus won the FIPRESCI Prize at the Stockholm Film Festival in 1998 and the Prix Europa Special at Prix Europa in 1999. Ristumine peateega (The Highway Crossing) directed by Arko Okk won the "FIPRESCI Prize" at the Stockholm International Film Festival in 1999 and the Prize OPERA PRIMA at the Uruguay International Film Festival in 2000. The Highway Crossing was also the first Estonian film at Hongkong International Film Festival HKIFF.

Since then, the trend has also been towards joint film productions such as Peeter Simm's Head käed (Good Hands) (2001) a joint Estonian-Latvian coproduction that in 2002 won the Manfred Salzgeber Award at the Berlin International Film Festival and the Golden Olive Tree Lecce Festival of European Cinema in Italy. Kõrini (Fed Up) (2005) an Estonian-German coproduction. Arvo Iho' s Karu süda (Hart of the Bear) (2001) nominated for Golden St. George at the Moscow International Film Festival and for the European Film Award at European Film Awards, was a coproduction between Estonia, Germany, Russia and the Czech Republic.

The most commercially successful Estonian film in 2002 was Nimed marmortahvlil (2002) (Names in Marble) by Elmo Nüganen and in 2003 a comedy by Rando Pettai Vanad ja kobedad saavad jalad alla (Made in Estonia) that in Estonia topped the international blockbuster The Lord of the Rings: The Two Towers with its box office results.

In 2004, two young directors emerged Jaak Kilmi and René Reinumägi with their Sigade revolutsioon (Revolution of Pigs) that won the Special Jury Prize and was nominated for Golden St. George at the Moscow International Film Festival, and for Grand Prix Asturias at the Gijón International Film Festival.

In 2007, about 10 feature films were made in Estonia. Most notable perhaps Sügisball (2007) by Veiko Õunpuu receiving among other awards Best Director at the Thessaloniki Film Festival, International Film Festival Bratislava and Venice Horizons Award at the 64th Venice International Film Festival. Georg (2007) by Peeter Simm is a movie about the life of legendary Estonian singer Georg Ots.

Most recent awarded film is Veiko Õunpuu's The Temptation of St. Tony (2009). In 2011, Estonia made eight full-length films, which included one animated film.

== 2002 Top Ten Poll results ==
The Estonian feature films Top Ten Poll in 2002 by Estonian film critics and journalists

1. Kevade (1969) directed by Arvo Kruusement
2. Hullumeelsus (1968) directed by Kaljo Kiisk
3. Ideaalmaastik (1980) directed by Peeter Simm
4. Viimne reliikvia (1969) directed by Grigori Kromanov
5. Georgica (1998) directed by Sulev Keedus
6. Nipernaadi (1993) directed by Kaljo Kiisk
7. "Hukkunud Alpinisti" hotell (1979) directed by Grigori Kromanov
8. Naerata ometi (1985) directed by Leida Laius, Arvo Iho
9. Põrgupõhja uus Vanapagan (1964) directed by Grigori Kromanov, Jüri Müür
10. Tuulte pesa (1979) directed by Olav Neuland

== See also ==
- List of Estonian films
- Estonian animation
- Cinema of the world
- List of Estonian submissions for the Academy Award for Best Foreign Language Film
