= Rein Aedma =

Estonian film actor

- Born: 19 September 1952 (age 73); Tallinn, then part of Estonian SSR, Soviet Union
- Occupation: Actor
- Years active: 1969–present
- Children: 2

Rein Aedma (born 19 September 1952) is an Estonian film actor who made his screen debut as a teenager and is possibly best recalled for his role as Jaan Imelik in three film adaptations of novels penned by author Oskar Luts: Kevade (1969), Suvi (1976), and Sügis (1990), and a 2020 follow-up film Talve.

== Early life and Kevade ==
Rein Aedma was born and raised in Tallinn, where he attended secondary school at the Tallinn Sports Boarding School (now, the Audentes Sports Gymnasium). In early 1969, when Aedma was sixteen, Tallinnfilm began casting roles for the Arvo Kruusement directed film adaptation of Oskar Luts' 1912–1913 two-part short novel Kevade, which followed the lives of residents of the rural, fictitious village of Paunvere in the late 19th-century.

One of Aedma's teachers had submitted his photograph for consideration for the roles of the novel's characters Jaan Imelik and Joosep Toots. Aedma was one of many youths throughout the country whose school photographs were submitted for possible roles in the film. However, as he had no previous acting experience and the character of Jaan Imelik in the novels was blond and played the kannel (Aedma was dark-haired and couldn't play an instrument), he had no expectations to audition.

Aedma was later pulled from a chemistry class by the school's headmaster and Malle Jaakson, the assistant director of Kevade, and offered the role of Jaan Imelik on the condition that he bleached his dark hair blond and took lessons to learn to play the kannel, which he accepted and his hiring was approved by the Tallinnfilm Art Council. Schoolmate Aare Laanemets was chosen for the role of Joosep Toots, which Aedma had also been considered for.

Kevade proved to be both critically and financially successful following its release in January 1970 – in 2012, it was chosen as the "Film of the Century" by film critics of the Estonian Film Awards of the Century organised by Postimees in evaluating Estonian films made over the last one-hundred years (1912–2012).

== Later life and career ==
After production of the Kevade ended, Aedma returned to finish his studies at the Tallinn Sports Boarding School. In 1970, he was cast in a starring role in the Semjon Školnikov directed musical comedy film Varastati Vana Toomas for Tallinnfilm, which paired him opposite Kevade costar Kaljo Kiisk.

After failing to gain admission to the Tallinn Conservatory's performing arts department, Aedma apprenticed as a stonemason before enrolling at Tartu State University, majoring in Estonian language and literature. Following graduation, he spent several years as a primary school teacher in Pärnu.

Aedma would revisit the role of Jaan Imelik in three more films: 1976's Suvi (Summer) and 1990's Sügis (Fall), both again directed by Arvo Kruusement and based on the trilogy of novels penned by Oscar Luts of the same names. In 2020, he reprised the role for the Ergo Kuld directed Talve (Winter), screenwritten by Martin Algus and posthumously attributed to Luts, but unproven.

== Personal life ==
In the summer of 1991, Rein Aedma, his wife Heidi and two children, emigrated to Australia and settled in Gold Coast, Queensland. In Australia, he has worked as a stonemason, taxi driver, and security guard. He had retired from acting when he was asked to appear again as the character Imelik in the Ergo Kuld directed 2020 film Talve, shot on location in Palamuse, Estonia. Aedma visits Estonia every summer.
