= Ain Lutsepp =

Estonian actor and politician (born 1954)

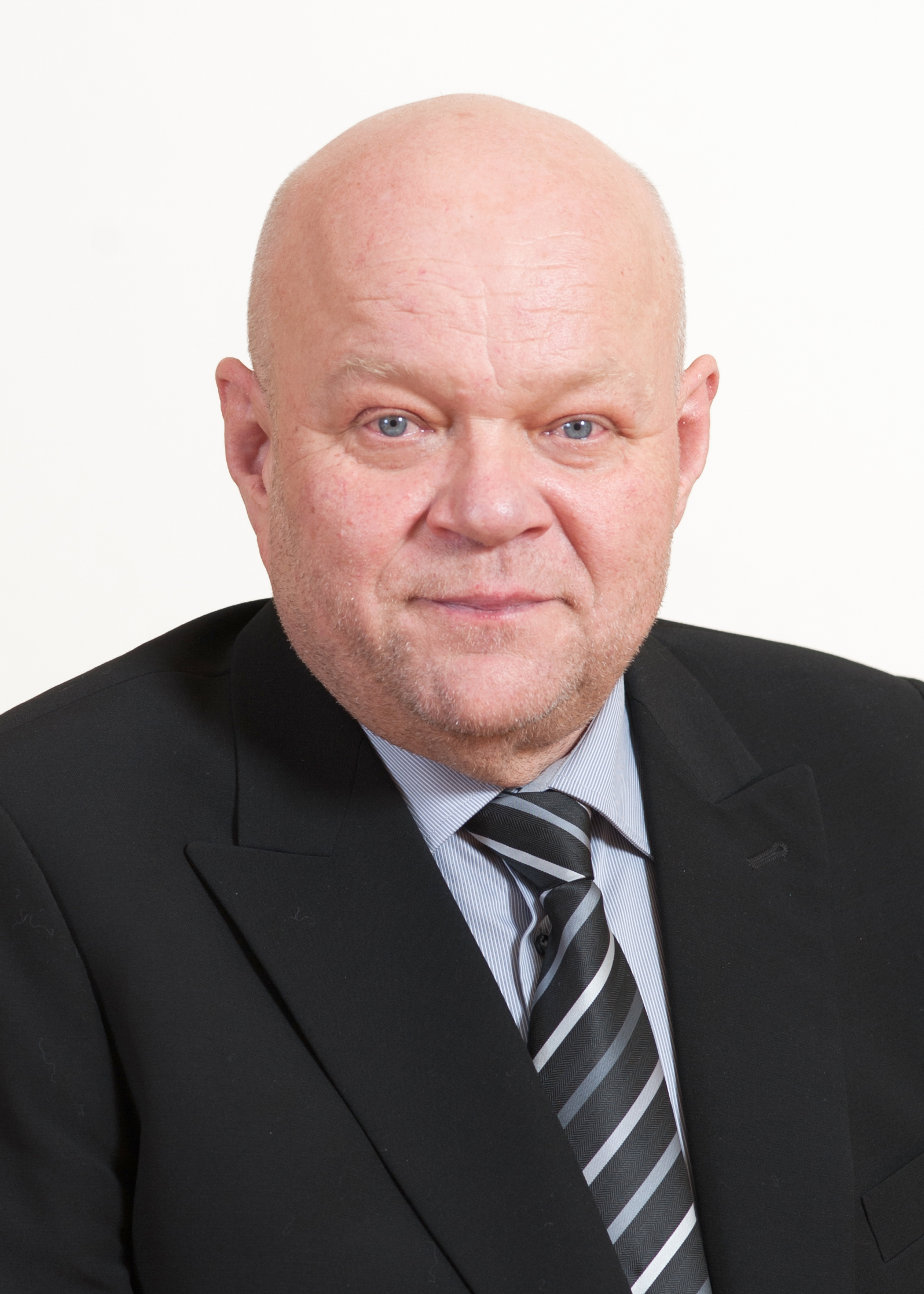
- Born: 6 May 1954 (age 72); Tallinn, then part of Estonian SSR, Soviet Union
- Occupations: Actor, politician
- Years active: 1969-present (actor); 2015-present (politician)
- Awards

Ain Lutsepp (born 6 May 1954) is an Estonian actor and politician.

== Early life and education ==
Born in Tallinn, Ain Lutsepp began his career as a child actor at age thirteen as the character Tõnisson in the 1969 Arvo Kruusement directed Estonian language film Kevade (English: Spring); a film adaptation of author Oskar Luts' popular 1913 novel of the same name.

In 1972, he graduated from the Tallinn 10th Secondary School (now, the Tallinn Nõmme Gymnasium) and in 1980 he graduated from the Tallinn State Conservatory's Performing Arts Department (present-day Estonian Academy of Music and Theatre) under course instructor Merle Karusoo. His classmates included actors Roman Baskin, Guido Kangur, Arvo Kukumägi, Paul Poom, Anne Veesaar, and Ülle Kaljuste.

== Acting career ==
Shortly after graduating from the Tallinn State Conservatory in 1980, Lutsepp was engaged at the Estonian Drama Theatre in Tallinn. There, he appeared in numerous stage productions until his departure in 2015. Among his more memorable international roles in theater were in works by: William Shakespeare, Lev Tolstoy, Charles Dickens, Jean Genet, Tom Stoppard, Samuel Beckett, Anton Chekhov, Henrik Ibsen, Arthur Miller, and Eugene O'Neill, among others; in addition to works by Estonian playwrights and authors A. H. Tammsaare, Madis Kõiv, Jaan Kross, Bernard Kangro, Paul-Eerik Rummo, Juhan Smuul, Hugo Raudsepp and others. Since 2008, he has been the Estonian Theatre Union chairman.

In addition to his stage career, Lutsepp has appeared in a number of film and television roles. Following his role as Tõnisson in the 1969 film adaptation of Oskar Luts' Kevade, he revisited the role twice more; in the 1976 film Suvi (English: Summer) and in the 1990 film Sügis (English: Fall); both directed by Arvo Kruusement and both based on novels penned by Oskar Luts of the same names. Since 2010, he has played the role of Albert Aavakivi in the Kanal 2 television drama series Pilvede all.

Other film roles include that of Madis in the 1983 biopic Lurich, about the Estonian strongman Georg Lurich; Jaan Lõoke, in the 1983 film Nipernaadi, an adaptation of August Gailit's 1928 novel Toomas Nipernaadi; Nymann, in the 2004 Hardi Volmer directed historical thriller Tulivesi (English: The Firewater); Julius Saarepuu, in the 2008 historical drama Detsembrikuumus (English: December Heat); as Ants, in the 2012 Ain Mäeots directed drama Deemonid (English: Demons), and as Volli in the Sulev Keedus-directed drama Mehetapja/Süütu/Vari in 2017. Additionally, he voiced the character of Eduard in the 2006 Estonian animated film Lotte from Gadgetville, as well as having performed in several radio plays.

== Political career ==
In 2015, Lutsepp ran as a member of the Estonian Free Party in the parliamentary elections in Constituency No. 3 (Nõmme and Mustamäe). He was the frontrunner of the race, garnering 4,109 votes and was elected to the XIII Riigikogu (Estonian Parliament).

== Awards and recognition ==
- 1979 - Voldemar Panso Prize
- 1982 - Special Jury Prize Award of the Year for stage production (Joosep - Vedelvorstis)
- 1987 - Ants Lauter Award
- 1988 - Theatre Association Annual Award (Vaikuse vallamaja)
- 1989 - Merited Artist of the Estonian SSR
- 1990 - Estonian Theatre Award for Best Male Lead Actor (Emigrandid, Vanalinnastuudio)
- 1991 - Estonian Theatre Award for Best Male Lead Actor (Kokkusaamine, Kiilaspäine lauljanna)
- 1994 - Estonian Theatre Award for Best Male Lead Actor (Filosoofipäev, Merlin, Doktor Karelli raske öö)
- 1995 - Ministry of Culture Award
- 1997 - 1997 Drama Festival Award (Maailmakõiksuse kiireim kell, Peiarite õhtunäitus)
- 1998 - Albert Üksip and Rudolf Nuude commemorative pocket watch holder
- 2000 - Estonian Theatre Award, the ensemble-play prize (Aristocrats)
- 2001 - Order of the White Star, V Class
- 2002 - Suur Ants, for Best Male Lead Actor (Werner Heisenberg - Kopenhaagen, härra Jenkins - Rahauputus, Shmuel Sprol - Kummikauplejad II)
- 2002 - Ministry of Culture Award (Kopenhaagen, Kummikauplejad and Rahauputus)
- 2006 - Order of the White Star, IV Class
- 2010 - Karl Ader Prize

== Selected filmography ==
- Lotte ja kadunud lohed (English: Lotte and the Lost Dragons) (2019)
- Supilinna Salaselts (English: The Secret Society of Souptown) (2015)
- Idioot (English: Idiot) (2011)
- Detsembrikuumus (English: December Heat) (2008)
- Lotte from Gadgetville (2006)
- Vana daami visiit (English: The Visit of the Old Lady) (2006)
- Tulivesi (English: The Firewater) (1994)
- Friends, Comrades (Finnish: Ystävät, toverit) (1990)
- Sügis (English: Fall) (1990)
- Tuulte pesa (English: Nest of Winds) (1979)
- Suvi (English: Summer) (1976)
- Kevade (English: Spring) (1969)
