= Heikki Koort =

Estonian diplomat (1955–2021)

Heikki Koort (1 March 1955 – 21 May 2021) was an Estonian diplomat, sport figure and actor.

Koort was born in Tallinn. In 1969, aged fourteen, he was cast in the role of Peterson in the Arvo Kruusement directed Estonian language film Kevade (English: Spring) for Tallinnfilm; a film adaptation of author Oskar Luts' popular 1913 short novel of the same name. After production of the film ended, he appeared in the role of Agu Sihvka in the 1970 television film Agu Sihvka annab aru before returning to finish his studies at Tallinn 47th Secondary School, graduating in 1973. In 1977, he graduated from the Faculty of Cultural Education of Tallinn Pedagogical University. Between 1975 and 1983, he won several medals in Estonian national championships in karate.

From 1992 until 2000, he was the president of Estonian Karate Federation.

From 1991 until 2007, he worked as a counsellor at Estonian Foreign Ministry, including from 1995 until 1997 in Moscow, and from 2000 until 2003, in Ankara.
