= Riina Hein =

Estonian actress, film producer and film director (born 1955)

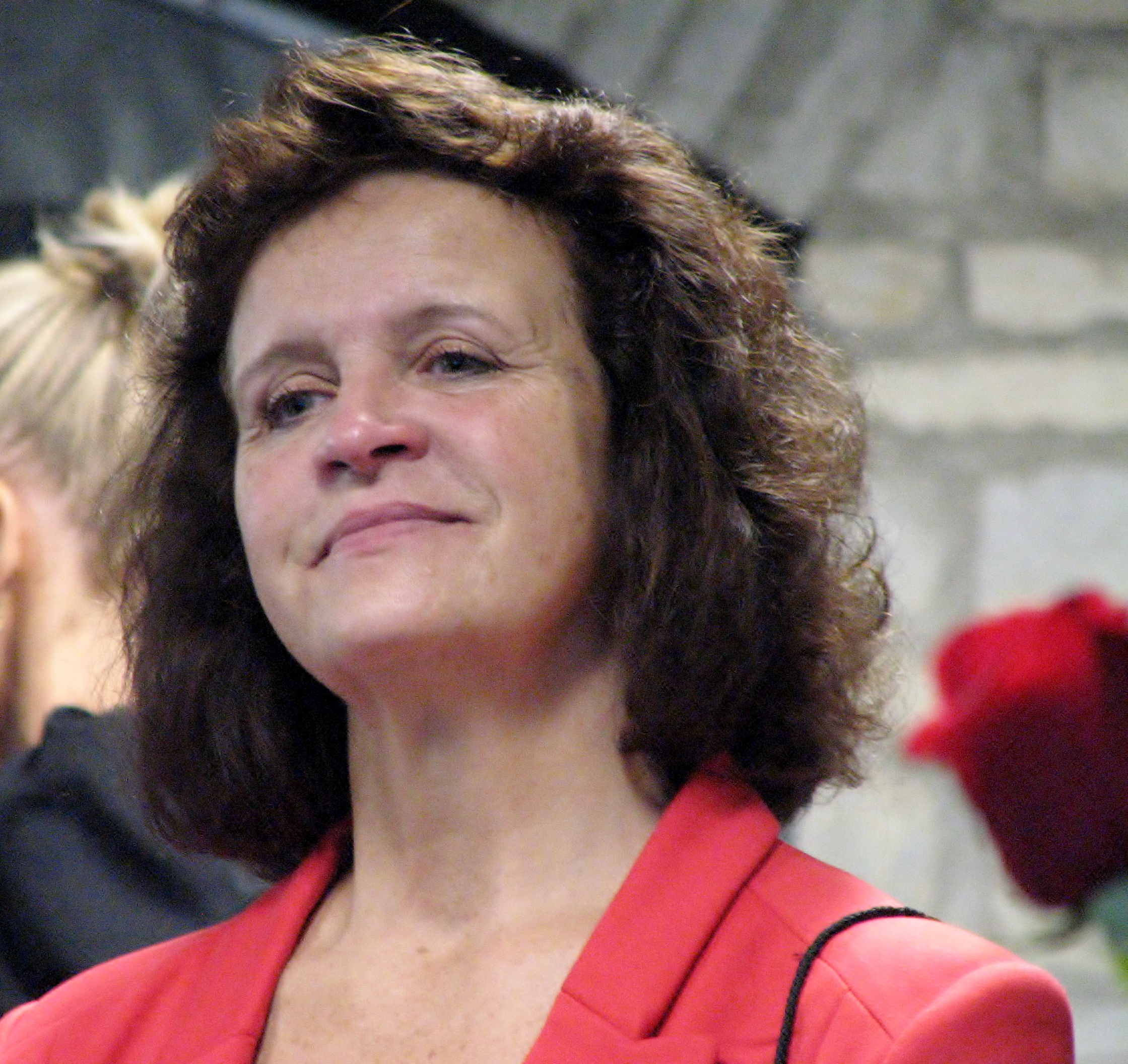
- Hein in 2012
- Born: 3 March 1955 (age 71); Tallinn, then part of Estonian SSR, Soviet Union
- Occupations: Actress, film director, film producer, screenwriter
- Years active: 1969–present
- Spouse: Juhan Aare (m. 1983; div. 2000)

Riina Hein (born 3 March 1955) is an Estonian film actress, film and television director and producer, and screenwriter. Hein made her screen debut as a teenager and is possibly best recalled for her role as Raja Teele in three film adaptations of novels penned by author Oskar Luts: Kevade (1969), Suvi (1976), and Sügis (1990), and a 2020 follow-up film Talve (Winter). After largely retiring from acting, Hein has focused on a career in television advertising, and film and television directing and producing.

== Early life and Kevade ==
Riina Hein was born and raised in Tallinn and spent her summers with her paternal grandparents in the rural village of Järvakandi.

In 1969, aged thirteen, she was cast in the role of Raja Teele in the Arvo Kruusement directed Estonian language film Kevade (English: Spring) for Tallinnfilm; a film adaptation of author Oskar Luts' popular 1913 short novel of the same name. After production of the film ended, Hein returned to finish her studies at Tallinn 42nd Secondary School (now Kadriorg German Gymnasium). Kevade proved to be both commercially and critically successful.

In 2012, Kevade was chosen as the "Film of the Century" and Hein's character Raja Teele and costar Arno Liiver's character Arno Tali were chosen as "Couple of the Century" by film critics of the Estonian Film Awards of the Century organised by Postimees in evaluating Estonian films made over the last one-hundred years (1912–2012).

== Later life and career ==
Hein would revisit the role of Raja Teele in three more films: 1976's Suvi (Summer) and 1990's Sügis (Fall), both again directed by Arvo Kruusement and based on the trilogy of novels penned by Oscar Luts of the same names which followed the lives of residents of the rural, fictitious village of Paunvere in the late 19th-century. In 2020, she reprised the role for the Ergo Kuld directed Talve (Winter), written by Martin Algus and posthumously attributed to Luts, but unproven. The four films would be Hein's only acting credits.

After graduating from secondary school in 1973, Hein enrolled at the Faculty of Economics of Tartu State University, graduating in 1977. In 1986, she began working as an editor, director, and producer at Eesti Reklaamfilm, leaving in 1991 to establish Creare Stuudio OÜ, where she works as manager, director, screenwriter, and producer of commissioned films, television programmes and documentaries, including the 2005 documentary Minu Eestimaa.

== Personal life ==
In 1983, Riina Hein married journalist and politician Juhan Aare. The couple divorced in 2000.

Since 2007, Hein has been an internationally licensed coach of Zhong Yuan Qigong.
