= Arno Liiver =

Estonian actor (1954–2026)

- Born: 11 October 1954; Mõisaküla, then part of Estonian SSR, Soviet Union
- Died: 1 January 2026 (aged 71); Estonia
- Occupation: Actor
- Years active: 1969–1990
- Children: 1

Arno Liiver (11 October 1954 – 1 January 2026) was an Estonian actor who came to prominence as a teenager with his film debut in a starring role as Arno Tali in the 1969 eponymously titled film adaptation of Oskar Luts' 1912–1913 two-part short novel Spring. Liiver reprised the role for two more film adaptions of novels by Luts, Summer (1976) and Autumn (1990), before retiring from acting.

== Early life and Spring ==
Arno Liiver was born Mõisaküla, Viljandi County on 11 October 1954, to Hans and Natalia Liiver. The family later relocated to Tallinn, where he was a member of the youth acting club of the Tallinn Pioneers' Palace. In early 1969, aged fourteen, he was cast in the role of Arno Tali in the Arvo Kruusement directed Estonian language film Spring (Estonian: Kevade) for Tallinnfilm; a film adaptation of author Oskar Luts' popular 1912-1913 two-part short novel of the same name which followed the lives of residents of the rural, fictitious village of Paunvere in the late 19th-century. Liiver was suggested to Kruusement and cinematographer Harri Rehe by actor Evald Aavik as they were having difficulty casting for the starring role. Upon release in 1970, Spring proved to be both commercially and critically successful.

After eight months of filming Spring, Liiver decided he didn't wish to pursue a career as an actor, although he later stated that the time spent making the film was filled with happy memories. He graduated from Tallinn Secondary School No. 47 in 1970. He then studied at Tallinn City Vocational School No. 12 to become an electrician.

In 2012, Spring was chosen as the "Film of the Century" and Liiver's character Arno Tali and costar Riina Hein's character Raja Teele were chosen as "Couple of the Century" by film critics of the Estonian Film Awards of the Century organised by Postimees in evaluating Estonian films made over the last one-hundred years (1912–2012).

== Summer and Autumn and later life ==
Although disinterested in acting, Liiver would reprise the role of Arno Tali in two more films: 1976's Summer and 1990's Autumn, both again directed by Arvo Kruusement and based on the trilogy of novels penned by Oscar Luts of the same names.

Following his acting career, Liiver worked in Tallinn as a truck driver, taxi driver and locksmith. In 2002, he moved to the village of Kogri on the island of Hiiumaa with his wife Anne, where they raised livestock and were herders for a dairy cooperative. The couple had one child; a daughter.

In 2018 and 2023, he was charged with driving while intoxicated and ordered to serve a one-year prison sentence, later reduced to one month. In 2024, he moved back to the Estonian mainland.

In 2020, when the remaining main cast of Spring, Summer, and Autumn reunited for the filming of Winter, written by Martin Algus and directed by Ergo Kuld, as a continuation of the Luts stories, Liiver was not invited to reprise his role of Arno Tali.

== Death ==
Liiver died in Estonia on 1 January 2026, at the age of 71. He was preceded in death by his wife Anne in 2016.
