= Autumn (1990 film) =

1990 film by Arvo Kruusement

- Directed by: Arvo Kruusement
- Written by: Mats Traat; Oskar Luts
- Produced by: Maret Hirtentreu
- Starring: Margus Lepa; Liina Tennosaar; Anne Reemann; Kaljo Kiisk; Ita Ever; Tõnu Oja; Aare Laanemets; Väino Laes; Ain Lutsepp
- Cinematography: Valeri Blinov
- Edited by: Lauri Kärk
- Music by: Veljo Tormis
- Production company: Tallinnfilm
- Release date: 22 February 1991
- Running time: 85 minutes
- Country: Estonia
- Language: Estonian

Autumn (Estonian: Sügis) is a 1990 Estonian comedy-drama film directed by Arvo Kruusement and based on the novels Sügis and Äripäev by Oskar Luts. The film is a sequel to Summer.

== Cast ==
- Margus Lepa as Kiir
- Liina Tennosaar as Juuli
- Anne Reemann as Maali
- Kaljo Kiisk as Kristjan Lible
- Ita Ever as Mamma Kiir aka Katarina Rosalie
- Tõnu Oja as Bruno Benno Bernhard
- Aare Laanemets as Joosep Toots
- Riina Hein as Teele
- Väino Laes as Oskar Luts
- Rein Aedma as Jaan Imelik
- Arno Liiver as Arno Tali
- Ain Lutsepp as Tõnisson
- Tiit Lilleorg as Kippel
- Aarne Üksküla as Paavel
- Tõnu Kark as Aaberkukk
- Jelena Tarassenko as Aliide
- Arnold Kasuk as Pastor
- Andrus Vaarik as Settler
- Maria Klenskaja as Liisi
- Helene Vannari as Linda
- Jaanus Orgulas as Merchant
- Paul Poom as Clerk
- Gert Laanemets as Riks
- Jukka Laanemets as Leks
- Tõnu Alveus as Lesta
- Heido Selmet – Visak
