= Laanemets =

Laanemets or Läänemets is an Estonian surname. Notable people with the surname include:

- Aare Laanemets (1954–2000), Estonian actor and director
- Lauri Läänemets (born 1983), Estonian politician
