= Poom =

Family name

Poom is an Estonian surname. Notable people with the surname include:

- Markus Poom (born 1999), Estonian footballer
- Mart Poom (born 1972), Estonian footballer and coach
- Paul Poom (born 1958), Estonian actor
