= Paul Poom =

Estonian stage, film, television, and radio actor

- Born: 30 June 1958 (age 67); Tallinn, then part of Estonian SSR, Soviet Union
- Occupation: Actor
- Years active: 1978–1993
- Spouse: Mare Poom (divorced)
- Children: 2

Paul Poom (born 30 June 1958) is a former Estonian stage, film, television, and radio actor whose career began in the late 1970s and ended in 1993 after an assault left him permanently disabled.

== Early life and education ==
Paul Poom was born and raised in Tallinn, where he attended primary and secondary schools; he is a 1976 graduate of Tallinn 37th Secondary School. Afterward, he enrolled in the Tallinn State Conservatory's (now, the Estonian Academy of Music and Theatre) Performing Arts Department to study acting under course instructor Merle Karusoo, who instructed the course in the educational theory and practice of Soviet pedagogue Anton Makarenko.

Poom's first stage role was as a boy who runs away from home in a 1978 production of Rein Saluri's 1977 play Poiste sõidud at the Estonian Drama Theatre, directed by Mikk Mikiver. Poom would reprise the role for a 1980 Eesti Televisioon (ETV) television play. Poom graduated in 1980; among his diploma productions were the roles of Semjon Karabanov and Perets in Makarenko Colony in 1979 at the Estonian State Youth Theatre (now, Tallinn City Theatre) which was adapted from the Anton Makarenko-penned 1933 novel The Pedagogical Poem, and Don Juan in the Molière-penned 1665 comedy Le Festin de Pierre in 1980 at the Estonian Drama Theatre in Tallinn (then known as the Viktor Kingissepp Tallinn State Drama Theatre) and the Ugala theatre in Viljandi. Graduating classmates of Poom's included actors Roman Baskin, Guido Kangur, Arvo Kukumägi, Ain Lutsepp, Anne Veesaar, and Ülle Kaljuste.

== Career ==
=== Stage ===
After graduation from the Tallinn State Conservatory, Poom began an engagement at the Estonian Drama Theatre in Tallinn, where he would perform as an actor for eight years. Among his more memorable international roles in theatre were in works by: Leonid Andreyev, Lev Tolstoy, Jean Sarment, Valentin Rasputin, Jean Anouilh, Chinghiz Aitmatov, Alan Ayckbourn, Gabit Musirepov, Samuel Beckett, and Françoise Sagan. Roles in productions of Estonian playwrights and authors include works by: Mats Traat, Eduard Vilde, Paul-Eerik Rummo, Juhan Smuul, Jaan Kross, Heljo Mänd, A. H. Tammsaare, Kalle Kurg, and Jaan Kruusvall. In addition to acting, he also worked as a music stylist on several of the stage productions he was appearing in. Poom left the theatre in 1988 and then worked as a freelance actor.

=== Film ===
Paul Poom's first feature film role was as Peeter Viksur in the Peeter Simm-directed historical agitprop drama Ideaalmaastik in 1980 for Tallinnfilm which takes place just after World War II on an Estonian collective farm. This was followed by a smaller role in the 1981 Veljo Käsper-directed melodrama Pihlakaväravad. Poom appeared in approximately twelve feature film roles. His most prominent roles in feature films include that of Peetrus in the 1983 Kaljo Kiisk-directed Nipernaadi, which was a film adaptation of the 1928 novel Toomas Nipernaadi by August Gailit; as Cown in the 1984 Tõnis Kask-directed drama Kaks paari ja üksindus; as Aadu Kaarjas in the 1988 Aare Tilk-directed short feature film comedy Giordano; as Lembit in the 1989 Leida Laius-directed drama Varastatud kohtumine; and as Valter in the 1990 Sulev Keedus-directed period drama film Ainus pühapäev. His last appearance in a feature film was in the 1994 Jüri Sillart-directed romantic drama Victoria (Ühe armastuse lugu), based on the 1898 novel Victoria by Knut Hamsun, and filmed prior to the 1993 assault that left him disabled.

=== Television ===
Beginning in 1980, Paul Poom appeared frequently on Estonian television in number of teleplays and television films. His most memorable roles in television films include that of a mechanic in the 1982 Leo Karpin-directed musical comedy film Teisikud and as Paul in the Peeter Simm-directed 1987 television period film drama Tants aurukatla ümber for Eesti Telefilm, based on the 1971 novel of the same name by Mats Traat. Significant roles in televised productions of stage plays throughout the 1980s include roles in works by Jean Anouilh, Eduard Vilde, Priit Aimla, Aleksei Arbuzov, Ilya Ilf, Richard M. Sherman, Eduard Vilde, Heinrich Mann, Jaan Kross, Lilian Põldre, and Françoise Sagan.

Poom also appeared on several ETV children's television series, including Vandersellid with Guido Kangur and Ivo Eensalu from 1982 until 1983, as the character Dwarf Paul in the 1981 Ene-Mari Tali-penned series Päkapikula, and as Taat in the Ene-Mari Tali-penned Paharet lumeveskis in 1986. On several of the series, he also wrote the accompanying music.

=== Radio ===
Between 1980 and 1992, Poom worked extensively as an actor in radio plays for Eesti Raadio, including productions of works by such authors and playwrights as: Gianni Rodari, Yanka Kupala, Eduard Vilde, Selma Lagerlöf, Boris Vasilyev, Barrie Stavis, Nodar Dumbadze, Alexander Pushkin, Antoine de Saint-Exupéry, Ardi Liives, and Paul-Eerik Rummo.

== Assault and disability ==
At 9:00 am in late February 1993, police in Tallinn Old Town found an unconscious, bleeding man lying on Vene Street with his pockets turned inside out. Police initially incorrectly assumed the man was a vagrant and intoxicated and they transported him to a sobering up facility in the city's subdistrict of Männiku. After he didn't regain consciousness, authorities realized that he wasn't intoxicated and was having a medical emergency and he was transported to Mustamäe Emergency Hospital, where emergency physicians determined that the man had suffered a severe beating. Poom was unrecognizable due to the assault and could only relay that his given name was Paul. He was admitted to the hospital under the name "Paul Unknown" before lapsing into a coma and was placed on a ventilator.

Poom was eventually identified and spent nearly a year in hospital and required two brain surgeries. He eventually regained consciousness, but was left permanently disabled; losing most of his sight, the ability to speak, and with severely impaired motor and cognitive function. With donations from the Estonian Theatre Union, he was transferred to the Tartu University Clinic, where he was able to regain some mobility and eventually learned to speak again. However, he is left in need of continuous care.

Poom has only a vague recollection of the assault, believing he was attacked by two men and two women. No one was ever charged in connection with the assault.

== Personal life ==
Poom was married to Mare Poom and later divorced. The couple have a daughter. He was later in a long-term relationship with actress Anne Paluver, with whom he has a son. Poom is a grandfather.

Poom currently resides in Tallinn. He formerly lived with his elderly mother Ilse and his stepfather Henno who acted as his primary caretakers. He is occasionally visited by former theatre and television colleagues including former Tallinn State Conservatory classmates Ain Lutsepp, Anne Veesaar, and until 2018 Roman Baskin, as well as actor and musician Tõnis Mägi.
