= Kaljo Kiisk =

Estonian film director

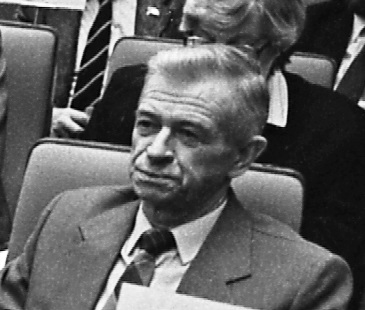
- Born: 3 December 1925; Vaivina, Ida-Viru County, Estonia
- Died: 20 September 2007 (aged 81); Tallinn, Estonia
- Education: Russian Institute of Theatre Arts
- Occupations: Actor, film director, screenwriter, politician
- Years active: 1953–1993
- Spouse: Zinaida Kiisk (m. 1947)
- Children: 1

Kaljo Kiisk (3 December 1925 – 20 September 2007) was an Estonian actor, film director, screenwriter and politician. He was best known for his roles as Kristjan Lible from Spring (Estonian: Kevade), Summer (Suvi) and Autumn (Sügis), film adaptations of Oskar Luts' novels, and as Johannes Saarepera from ETV's long-running Õnne 13. His career spanned over half a century from 1953 to 2007.

== Early life ==
Kiisk was born and raised in Vaivina. In 1944, aged 18, he served in the anti-aircraft unit of the 20th Waffen Grenadier Division of the SS (1st Estonian), and took part in the Battle of Tannenberg Line. After World War II, he managed to obscure his military service from the Soviet occupiers. In 1946, he graduated from the Rakvere 1st Secondary School and enrolled at the Tallinn University of Technology. He switched the next year to the ESSR State Theatre Institute and in 1948, to the Russian Institute of Theatre Arts. Graduating in 1953, he returned to Estonia and joined the Estonian Drama Theatre.

== Career ==
=== Stage, film and television ===
His first play was an adaptation of Oskar Luts' novel Spring (Estonian: Kevade), staged together with Kulno Süvalep in 1954, in which Kiisk played the part of the bright yet restless Joosep Toots. From 1955 to 1990, he worked as an actor and director at Tallinnfilm. His most notable works as a director included Naughty Curves (1959) and Dangerous Curves (1961), Madness (1969) and Nipernaadi (1983) He wrote the screenplay of the 1969 film Spring, an adaptation of Oskar Luts' popular novel, in which he also starred as Paunvere's bell-ringer Kristjan Lible. The film became an Estonian classic. From 1993 to 2007 (his death), he starred in Õnne 13 as Johannes Saarepera.

=== Politics ===
From 1980 to 1990, Kiisk was a member of the Supreme Soviet of the Estonian SSR and from 1989 to 1991, a member of the Congress of People's Deputies of the Soviet Union. In 1995 and 1999, he was elected to the Riigikogu as a member of the Estonian Reform Party.

== Personal life ==
Kiisk married his classmate Zinaida Ivanova in 1947. They had a daughter, Riina, who married actor and poet Juhan Viiding. Poet Elo Viiding is his granddaughter.

== Filmography ==
=== Film ===
Title	Year	Functioned as				Notes
Title	Year	Director	Writer	Actor	Role	Notes
Yachts at Sea (Jahid merel)	1955	Yes		Yes	Heino	Assistant director
Andrus' Happiness (Andruse õnn)	1955			Yes	Teder	
The Turning Point (Pöördel)	1957	Yes				Assistant director
June Days (Juunikuu päevad)	1957	Yes				
Naughty Curves (Vallatud kurvid)	1959	Yes				
One village men (Ühe küla mehed)	1961			Yes	Raimond	
Dangerous Curves (Ohtlikud kurvid)	1961	Yes				
Ice drift (Jääminek)	1962	Yes				
Traces (Jäljed)	1963	Yes				
We Were 18 Years Old (Me olime 18-aastased)	1965	Yes				
What Happened to Andres Lapeteus? (Mis juhtus Andres Lapeteusega?)	1966			Yes	Ants Pajuviidik	
Midday Ferryboat (Keskpäevane praam)	1967	Yes				
Madness (Hullumeelsus)	1968	Yes		Yes	Harmonica man	
Spring (Kevade)	1969		Yes	Yes	Kristjan Lible	
Old Toomas Has Been Stolen (Varastati Vana Toomas)	1970			Yes	Old Thomas	Musical film
Windy Coast (Tuuline rand)	1971	Yes				
To Step Ashore (Maaletulek)	1972	Yes		Yes	Harald	
Unusual story (Tavatu lugu)	1973			Yes	Detective Kaur	
Red violin (Punane viiul)	1974	Yes		Yes	Commander	
Indrek	1975			Yes	Voitinski	
Death under sail (Nāve zem buras)	1976			Yes	Detective-Sergeant Aloysius Birrell	
Summer (Suvi)	1976			Yes	Kristjan Lible	
Ask the Dead About the Price of Death (Surma hinda küsi surnutelt)	1977	Yes		Yes	Doctor	
Wild violets (Metskannikesed)	1980	Yes				
Arabella, the Pirate's Daughter (Arabella, mereröövli tütar)			Yes	Firefighter	Adaption of Aino Pervik's short story.	
Nipernaadi	1983	Yes				
There Were the Trees... (Puud olid ...)	1985			Yes	Pakk-Rätsep	
In One Hundred Years in May (Saja aasta pärast mais)	1986	Yes		Yes	Viktor Kingissepp's interrogator	
Vernanda	1988			Yes	Old gentleman	
Regina	1989	Yes				
Upside Down (Наизнанку)	1989			Yes	Tamm	Short
Awakening (Äratus)	1989			Yes	Jaan	
Autumn (Sügis)	1990			Yes	Kristjan Lible	
Rahu street (Rahu tänav)	1991			Yes	Eugen	
Prompter (Suflöör)	1993	Yes				
Victoria (Victoria (Ühe armastuse lugu))	1994			Yes	Guest	
Jüri Rumm	1994			Yes	Old stableman	
Roller coaster (Ameerika mäed)	1994			Yes	Albert	
I'm tired of hating (Ma olen väsinud vihkamast)	1995			Yes	Carpenter	
Letters from the East (Kirjad idast)	1995			Yes	Old farmer	
Ladybirds' Christmas (Lepatriinude jõulud)	2001			Yes	Imanuel (voice)	Animated film
The Visit of the Old Lady (Vana daami visiit)	2006			Yes	Doctor	Adaption of The Visit.
Hostage (Koer, lennuk ja laulupidu)	2006			Yes	Old man	

=== Television ===
Title	Year	Role	Notes
My Wife Became a Grandmother (Minu naine sai vanaemaks)	1976	Friend	Movie
Two Couples and Loneliness (Kaks paari ja üksindus)	1984	Farmer	Movie adaption of O. Henry's short story.
The Dance Around the Steam Boiler (Tants aurukatla ümber)	1987	Taavet Aniluik	Movie adaption of Mats Traat's novel.
Doctor Stockmann (Doktor Stockmann)	1988	Father	Movie
An Old Man is Missing His Home (Vana mees tahab koju)	1991	Toomas Simmo	Movie
Õnne 13	1993–2007	Johannes Saarepera	14 seasons

== Honours ==
- Order of the White Star, 3rd Class
- PÖFF Lifetime Achievement Award
