= Vaivina =

Village in Estonia

Coordinates: 59°24′48″N 27°37′15″E

- Village
- Interactive map of Vaivina
- Country: Estonia
- County: Ida-Viru County
- Parish: Toila Parish
- Time zone: UTC+2 (EET)
  - Summer (DST): UTC+3 (EEST)

Vaivina is a village in Toila Parish, Ida-Viru County in northeastern Estonia.

Actor and film director Kaljo Kiisk (1925–2007), was born in Vaivina.
