= Harri Rehe =

Estonian cinematographer

Harri Rehe (or Harry Rehe; 26 December 1930 – 3 February 2013) was an Estonian cinematographer.

He was born in Pärnu.

From 1960 to 1972 he worked at Tallinnfilm, and from 1972 to 1987 in Eesti Telefilm.

== Selected filmography ==
- "Ühe küla mehed" (1961)
- "Roosa kübar" (1963) (short feature film)
- "Supernoova" (1965)
- "Tütarlaps mustas" (1966)
- "Viini postmark" (1967)
- "Kevade" (1969)
- "Metskapten" (1971)
- "Teatriöö" (1971) (musical film)
- "Noor pensionär" (1972) (short feature film)
