= Undla =

Village in Estonia

Coordinates: 59°21′N 26°05′E

- Village
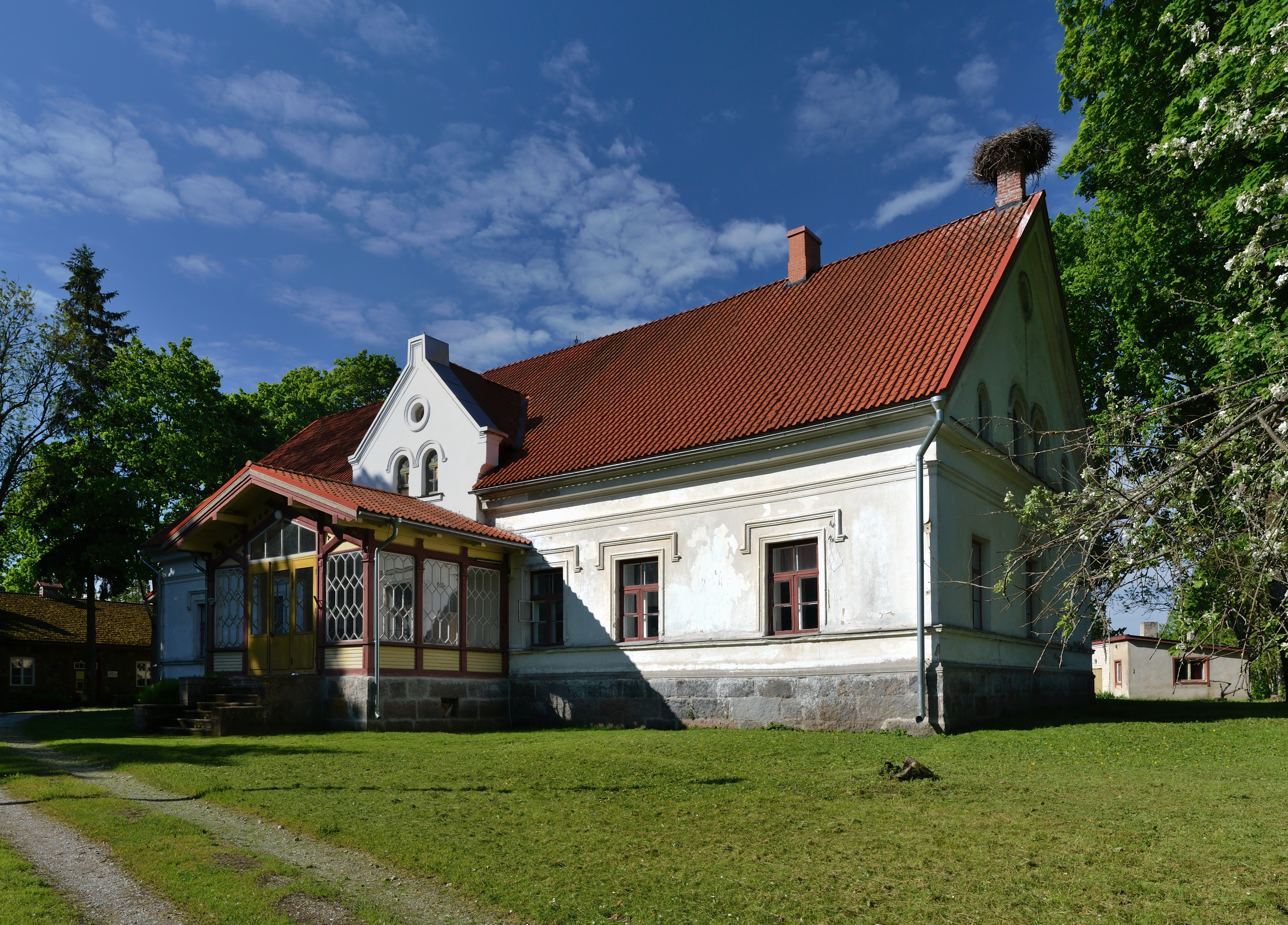
- Undla manor
- Interactive map of Undla
- Country: Estonia
- County: Lääne-Viru County
- Parish: Kadrina Parish
- Time zone: UTC+2 (EET)
  - Summer (DST): UTC+3 (EEST)

Undla is a village and settlement in Kadrina Parish, Lääne-Viru County, in northeastern Estonia. It lies on the left bank of the Loobu River, just northwest of Kadrina, the administrative centre of the municipality.

The actor and theatre and film director Arvo Kruusement was born in Undla in 1928.
