= Juhan Aare =

Estonian journalist and politician (1948–2021)

- Born: 20 February 1948; Tallinn, then part of Estonian SSR, Soviet Union
- Died: 6 October 2021 (aged 73)
- Movement: Estonian Green Movement, People's Union of Estonia

Juhan Aare (20 February 1948 – 6 October 2021) was an Estonian journalist and politician, and the founder of the Estonian Green Movement (not to be confused with current Estonian Green Party) as well as one of the instigators of the Phosphorite War protest movement. He was educated at the Tallinn 10th Workers' Youth Secondary School and graduated from the University of Tartu School of Economics and Business Administration in 1972. Aare was a literary contributor to the Säde newspaper from 1969 to 1972; edited Eesti Raadio broadcasts in stereo from 1973 to 1975; was a correspondent for Noorte Hääl from 1975 to 1977 and was a commentator for Eesti Televisioon from 1977 to 1991.

On 3 December 2002, he became a member of the People's Union of Estonia. In the 1980s he was a journalist for the TV program Panda, which dealt with environmental issues. Aare was an elected people's deputy of the Congress of People's Deputies of the Soviet Union representing the Pärnu city national-territorial electoral district No. 472 of the Estonian SSR from 1989 to 1991. He was a member of the Supreme Soviet of the Estonian Soviet Socialist Republic from 1988 to 1990, advised the Presidium of the Supreme Soviet of the Estonian Soviet Socialist Republic from 1991 to 1992 and was a member of the Riigikogu from 1992 to 1999. Aare was a member of the Communist Party of the Soviet Union, and of the Estonian Association of Journalists. He was the president of the Estonian Equestrian Federation and a member of the Estonian Olympic Committee from 1993 to 1998.

His younger brother was the musician Tõnu Aare (1953–2021). In 1983, Juhan Aare married the actress and film director Riina Hein. The couple divorced in 2000. He was awarded the Order of the National Coat of Arms, 4th Class in 2006 and the Estonian Cultural Endowment Prize in 2007.
