= Järvepera =

Village in Estonia

- Village
- Location in Estonia
- Coordinates: 58°42′12″N 26°35′01″E
- Country: Estonia
- County: Jõgeva County
- Municipality: Jõgeva Parish

Population (01.01.2011)
  - Total: 31

Järvepera is a village in Jõgeva Parish, Jõgeva County in Estonia. It is located just northeast of Palamuse, the administrative centre of the municipality, and southeast of Lake Kuremaa. Järvepera has a population of 31 (as of 1 January 2011).

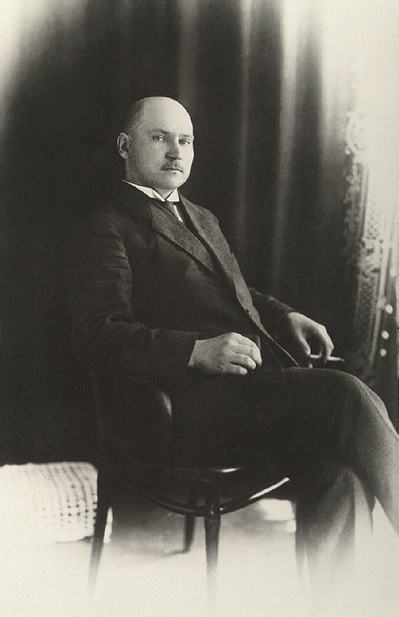
Oskar Luts

The Amme River begins from the Lake Kuremaa in Järvepera.

Writer and playwright Oskar Luts (1887–1953) was born in the Posti farmstead in Järvepera. On 24 July 1966 a memorial stone was placed on the site where the house once was situated.
