= Estonian animation =

The tradition of Estonian animation dates back to the 1930s when the first experimental films were made. The only surviving short film from the era is Kutsu-Juku seiklusi (Adventures of Juku the dog) (1931). After the Great Depression, World War II, and Soviet Occupation interrupted its development, Estonian animation was reborn in 1958. Elbert Tuganov founded a puppet film division Nukufilm in Tallinnfilm Studio. The first film was titled Peetrikese unenägu based on a Danish writer Jens Sigsgaard's children story Palle alene i verden. Joonisfilm an 2D and 3D animation division of Tallinnfilm was founded by Rein Raamat in 1971. Films like Põld (1978), nominee for Golden Palm at the Cannes Film Festival in 1979; Lend (1973), the winner of Special Jury Award at the Zagreb World Festival of Animated Films; the Suur Tõll (1980), 2nd place at Ottawa International Animation Festival in 1982 and Põrgu (Hell) (1983), the winner of FIPRESCI Prize and Special Jury Award at the Annecy International Animated Film Festival made Raamat the first internationally recognized Estonian animation director.

Since Estonia regained independence in 1991 Nukufilm and Joonisfilm continued to operate as private companies owned by the filmmakers. During the era internationally most successful Estonian animation director has been Priit Pärn the winner of Grand Prize at the Ottawa International Animation Festival in 1998 for Porgandite öö (Night of the Carrots). Crocodile by Kaspar Jancis was selected to be the Best European Anima film at Cartoon d'or 2010. The other film of Jancis "Villa Antropoff" was awarded with the Special Mention at the Scanorama Festival.

== See also ==
- List of Estonian animated films
