= Aare Laanemets =

Estonian actor and stage director (1954–2000)

- Born: 6 February 1954; Tallinn, then part of Estonian SSR, Soviet Union
- Died: 28 October 2000 (aged 46); Tallinn, Estonia
- Occupations: Actor, theatre director
- Years active: 1969–2000
- Children: 2

Aare Laanemets (6 February 1954 – 28 October 2000) was an Estonian actor and theatre director, who is possibly best recalled for his role as Joosep Toots in three film adaptations of novels penned by author Oskar Luts: Kevade (1969), Suvi (1976), and Sügis (1990). Laanemets' career began as a teenager and he worked steadily as an adult as a stage, film, and television actor until his death in 2000, aged 46. In 1984, he co-founded the Pärnu School Theatre, where he worked as an instructor and stage director.

== Early life and education ==
Aare Laanemets was born in Tallinn to Johannes and Ilse Dagmar Laanemets (née Heinluht). He had one sibling. He attended primary and secondary schools in Tallinn, graduating from the Tallinn Sports Boarding School (now, the Audentes Sports Gymnasium) in the Kristiine administrative district of the city in 1972. Afterwards, he enrolled in the Performing Arts Department of Tallinn State Conservatory (now, the Estonian Academy of Music and Theatre) under instruction of actor and theatre pedagogue Voldemar Panso, graduating in 1976. Among his graduating classmates were Merle Karusoo, Ago-Endrik Kerge, Urmas Kibuspuu, Kalju Orro, Anne Paluver, Külliki Tool, Lembit Peterson, Priit Pedajas, Eero Spriit, and Peeter Volkonski.

== Career ==
=== Film ===
At age fifteen, while still a secondary student at the Tallinn Sports Boarding School, Laanemets was cast as the character Joosep Toots in the 1969 Arvo Kruusement directed Estonian language film Kevade (English: Spring) for Tallinnfilm; a film adaptation of author Oskar Luts' popular 1912 short novel of the same name which followed the lives of residents of the rural, fictitious village of Paunvere in the early 20th-century. After production of the film ended, he returned to finish his studies at secondary school. The film proved to be both commercially and critically successful, and Laanemets revisited the role twice more; in the 1976 film Suvi (English: Summer) and in the 1990 film Sügis (English: Fall); both again directed by Arvo Kruusement and based on the trilogy of novels penned by Oscar Luts of the same names. Laanemets' role of Joosep Toots would prove to be one of his most popular and enduring film roles in Estonia.

In 1972, at age eighteen, Laanemets was cast in a starring role as Jim Hawkins in Ostrov sokrovishch, a Russian language Soviet film adaptation of Robert Louis Stevenson's Treasure Island, directed by Yevgeni Fridman. In 1974, he had a small role in the Naum Birman-directed Russian language World War II action film Ya sluzhu na granitse. During his career, Laanemets appeared in approximately twenty films. In addition to Estonian and Russian language films, Laanemets also appeared in the 1981 Gunārs Piesis-directed Latvian language historical drama feature film Laikmetu griežos for Riga Film Studio. His last film appearance was a small role in the 1993 Pekka Karjalainen-directed joint Estonian-Finnish co-production comedy feature Hysteria.

=== Stage ===
In 1976, shortly following his graduation from the Tallinn State Conservatory, Laanemets began an engagement as an actor at the Estonian Drama Theatre in Tallinn that lasted until his departure in 1983 when he joined the Endla Theatre in Pärnu. This would be Laanemets' longest engagement, lasting until he chose to leave the theatre in 1999, to move back to Tallinn. Prominent roles in his stage career included those in works by Selma Lagerlöf, Frances Hodgson Burnett, Brian Friel, A. H. Tammsaare, Gerhart Hauptmann, Raivo Trass, August Kitzberg, Nikos Kazantzakis, Marc Camoletti, and Maurice Maeterlinck, among others. Laanemets performed in over forty roles at the Endla Theatre and directed eleven plays, including five for children. In 1984, he co-founded the Pärnu School Theatre with actors Elmar Trink and Ahti Puudersell, where he worked as an instructor. Some of his students included Liisa Aibel, Kersti Heinloo, Külli Teetamm, Piret Laurimaa, Marko Matvere, and Ago Anderson.

=== Television ===
Along with a career in theatre and film, Laanemets also appeared in a number of television films, television plays, and made several appearances in television series. His first prominent television role was that of Tisler in the Elvi Koppel-directed Eesti Televisioon (ETV) children's play Kardemoni linna rahvas ja röövlid in 1976. This was followed by the role of Jesper in the 1980 children's television play Kardemoni linna rahvas ja röövlid, also directed by Elvi Koppel. In 1981, he appeared in the role of Laimonis Kalniņš in the Aloizs Brenčs-directed, Latvian language, seven part television period melodrama Ilgais ceļš kāpās. The following year, he appeared as Valentine in the Boris Nebieridze-directed, Russian language, two-part musical drama Faust. In 1985, he appeared as Martin the Ago-Endrik Kerge-directed two-part Estonian television drama film Kahe kodu ballaad. His last television appearance was in the Mart Kivastik-directed Estonian television film short Armuke, which aired in 2000, prior to his death.

== Personal life and death ==
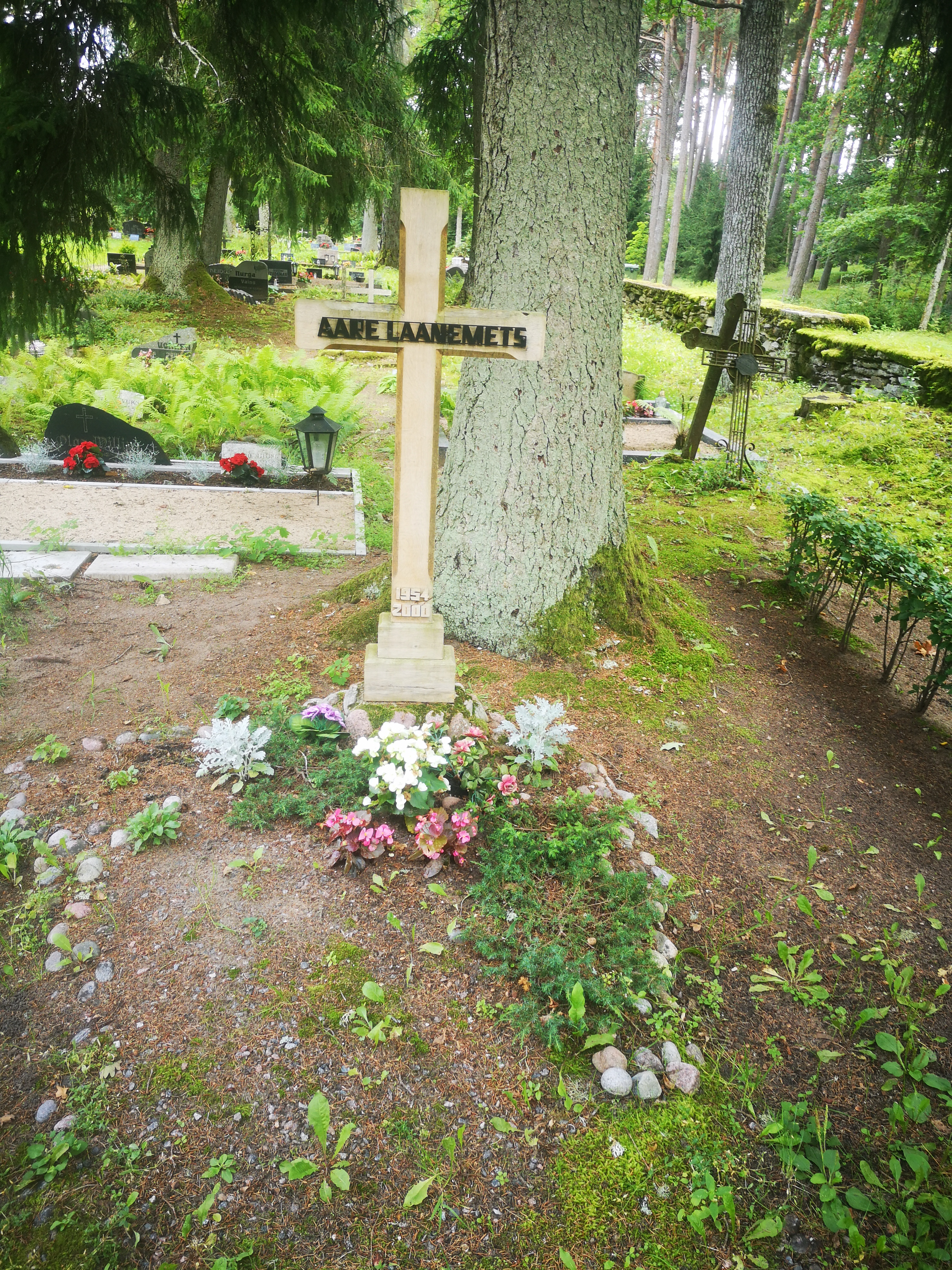
Grave of Aare Laanemets at Kullamaa cemetery.

Aare Laanemets was married and divorced. He had two children. Prior to his death he was in a relationship with actress and singer Heli Vahing. On 28 October 2000, he died after suffering a stroke in Tallinn, aged 46. He was interred at the cemetery in the village of Kullamaa in Lääne County.
