= Summer (1976 film) =

1976 film directed by Arvo Kruusement

- Directed by: Arvo Kruusement
- Written by: Paul-Eerik Rummo; Oskar Luts
- Produced by: Arkadi Pessegov
- Starring: Aare Laanemets; Riina Hein; Margus Lepa; Arno Liiver; Ain Lutsepp; Kaljo Kiisk; Kaarel Karm; Rein Aedma
- Cinematography: Jüri Garšnek
- Edited by: Kalju Haan
- Music by: Veljo Tormis
- Production company: Tallinnfilm
- Distributed by: Tallinnfilm
- Release date: 27 March 1976
- Running time: 80 minutes
- Countries: Estonia; Soviet Union
- Language: Estonian

Summer (Estonian: Suvi) is a 1976 Estonian comedy-drama film directed by Arvo Kruusement, based on the novels Suvi and Tootsi Pulm by Oskar Luts. It is the sequel to the 1969 film Spring.

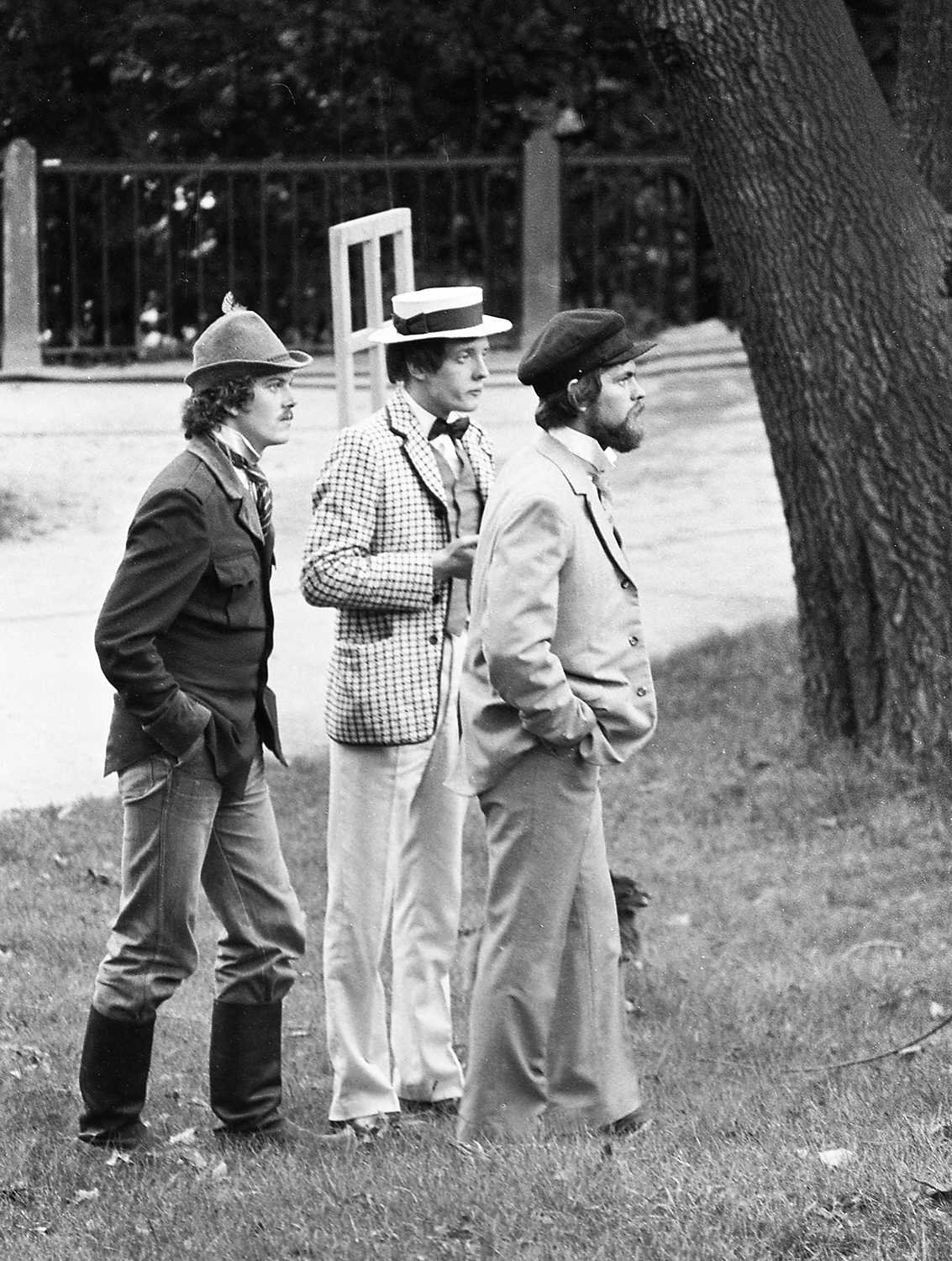
From left to right: Aare Laanemets as Joosep Toots, Margus Lepa as Kiir, and unidentified in 1976.

== Cast ==
- Aare Laanemets - Joosep Toots
- Margus Lepa - Kiir
- Riina Hein - Raja Teele
- Margus Lepa - Jorh/Georg Adniel Kiir
- Kaljo Kiisk - Kristjan Lible
- Ain Lutsepp - Tõnisson
- Rein Aedma - Imelik
- Kalle Eomois - Kuslap
- Arno Liiver - Arno Tali
- Kaarel Karm - Apothecary
- Ervin Abel - Papa Kiir
- Malli Vällik - Katarina Rosalie
- Andres Kalev - Ottomar
- Marco Meelimäe - Bruno Benno Bernhard
- Endel Ani - Parish clerk
- Katrin Välbe - Parish clerk's wife
- Mare Garšnek - Miss Ärnja
- Herta Elviste - Toots's mother
- Jüri Järvet - Toots's father
- Aino Vähi - Teele's mother
- Kalju Ruuven - Teele's father
- Tiina Rääk - Aliide
