= Spring (1969 film) =

1969 film directed by Arvo Kruusement

Kevade
- Directed by: Arvo Kruusement
- Screenplay by: Kaljo Kiisk; Voldemar Panso
- Based on: Kevade by Oskar Luts
- Produced by: Tallinnfilm
- Starring: Arno Liiver; Riina Hein; Aare Laanemets; Margus Lepa; Leonhard Merzin; Ain Lutsepp; Rein Aedma; Kaljo Kiisk; Endel Ani
- Cinematography: Harry Rehe
- Edited by: Silvia Kiik; Ludmilla Rozenthal
- Music by: Veljo Tormis
- Production company: Tallinnfilm
- Release date: January 3, 1970
- Running time: 84 minutes
- Countries: Estonia; Soviet Union
- Language: Estonian

Spring (Estonian: Kevade) is a 1969 Estonian film directed by Arvo Kruusement and is a film adaptation of Oskar Luts' popular novel of the same name. The movie placed first place in the Estonian feature films top ten poll held in 2002 by Estonian film critics and journalists. In 1970 the movie sold 558,000 tickets in Estonia, then nearly half of the country's total population of 1.36 million and 8,100,000 in the Soviet Union in 1971. The film was re-released in Estonia on 13 April 2006.

The film was shot in Palamuse, which was the prototype area of Oskar Luts' "Paunvere". It was followed by three sequels: 1976's Summer (Suvi), 1990's Autumn (Sügis) and 2020's Winter (Talve), all of which included original actors from this film.

The film is based on the short story of the same name ("Kevade") by Estonian writer and philosopher Oskar Luts, and takes place in an Estonian village at the end of the 19th century. The story focuses on the children of the village over the course of one academic year. The majority of the plot and character development takes place in the spring, culminating in first love, friendships, and other coming-of-age emotions.

== Plot ==
Set in mid-autumn, the story begins when Arno Tali, a new student recovering from scarlet fever, joins the parish school in Paunvere. On his first day, Arno is seated beside the mischievous Joosep Toots, an energetic troublemaker with a love for pranks and stories about Native Americans. Arno walks home with a classmate, Teele, whose family farm neighbors his own. Teele becomes Arno’s first love, awakening his romantic imagination. The school is filled with vibrant characters, including the cheerful but naive Tõnisson and the whiny, tattling Georg-Adniel Kiir, who often finds himself the target of Toots’ antics. One such prank involves Toots drunkenly attending Kiir’s baby brother’s christening, causing chaos with a gramophone before vanishing, leaving Kiir to deal with the aftermath. Toots even drags a hungover Kiir into an icy bath, stealing his clothes in the process. Attempts by the parish clerk to discipline Toots often fail, as only the compassionate teacher Laur can temporarily curb his antics through persuasion.

The students’ lives are punctuated by frequent clashes with the children of German landlords who attend a nearby school. In one brawl, Toots tips the scales by branding the opponents with red-hot fire tools. However, in another fight, Tõnisson suffers at the hands of the German boys wielding whips. Seeking revenge, Tõnisson sinks a raft used by the Germans, but suspicion falls on bell-ringer Kristian Lible. Arno, who has grown close to Lible, uncovers the truth and persuades Tõnisson to confess. When Arno attempts to report the matter, teacher Laur intervenes, resolving the situation so that Lible is cleared, Tõnisson avoids expulsion, and Arno avoids the stigma of being a tattler. Winter arrives, and the frozen river becomes a playground. Toots convinces the students to skate on thin ice, which breaks under Teele, causing her to fall in. Arno heroically attempts to save her but falls in himself. Both are rescued by Lible, but Arno falls ill afterward.

As winter progresses, new students join the school, including Jaan Imelik and his servant, Jüri Kuslap. Imelik, a carefree musician with a knack for the kannel, quickly wins over Teele, who forgets her affection for Arno. Teele’s newfound infatuation leaves Arno heartbroken, especially when he finds Imelik playing music in her home. At school, Teele asks Imelik to play a lively tune, and Toots pulls her into a dance, mockingly calling her “Tali’s fiancée.” Arno, too timid to intervene, watches as they accidentally knock over the parish clerk. Later, when Arno tries to reconcile with Teele, she angrily dismisses him, leaving him feeling defeated. With spring's arrival, the school term ends, and the students return home. Teele attempts to rekindle her bond with Arno after Imelik departs without saying goodbye, but Arno, having grown disillusioned, has moved on from his feelings for her.

== Cast ==
- Arno Liiver as Arno Tali
- Riina Hein as Raja Teele
- Aare Laanemets as Joosep Toots
- Margus Lepa as Georg Aadniel Kiir
- Ain Lutsepp as Tõnisson
- Leonhard Merzin as Teacher Laur
- Kaljo Kiisk as Kristjan Lible
- Rein Aedma as Jaan Imelik
- Kalle Eomois as Kuslap
- Raul Haaristo as Vipper
- Heikki Koort as Peterson
- Heido Selmet as Visak
- Endel Ani as Sacristan aka Julk-Jüri
- Tõnu Alveus as Lesta
- Ita Ever as Arno's mother
- Silvia Laidla as Köögi-Liisa
- Ervin Abel as Papa Kiir
