= Toomas Nipernaadi =

1928 novel by August Gailit

Cover of 1967 published version

Toomas Nipernaadi is a 1928 Estonian novel by August Gailit, as well as the (assumed) name of the novel's protagonist. It was strongly influenced by neo-romanticism. The story of the book was made into a film titled Nipernaadi in 1983. The novel appeared in English translation in 2018. The name of the bus Katarina Jee refers to a character from the novel.

== Character ==
The character is an archetypical traveller; a vagabond. He is noted for frequent lying, for promising something to everybody around him, and to beautiful women in particular — but always moving on before his promises can be fulfilled. Nipernaadi is a writer who spends his summers travelling incognito around Estonia. Despite the roguish nature of his behavior, he still somehow brings hope to the stagnant backwater villages he breezes through, inspiring the inhabitants to turn their own dreams into reality.

The novel has given modern Estonian the word nipernaadi, a somewhat whimsical term for an adventurous traveller who wants to experience something off the beaten track or beyond the usual tourist sights. The news and public affairs station Radio Kuku, for instance, has a regular travel feature called "Nipernaadid" (The Nipernaadis).
