= Arvo Kruusement =

Estonian actor and director (1928–2026)

- Born: 20 April 1928; Undla, Lääne-Viru County, Estonia
- Died: 9 September 2026 (aged 98)
- Occupations: Actor; film director
- Years active: 1953–1990; 2006

Arvo Kruusement (20 April 1928 – 9 September 2026) was an Estonian actor and film director.

== Life and career ==
Born in Undla, Kruusement attended the State Theatre Institute of the Estonian SSR in 1947–1948. He then studied acting at the State Institute for Theatre Arts in Moscow, graduating in 1953. From 1953 to 1959 he worked as an actor at the Estonian Drama Theatre in Tallinn, and then as a trainee director with Georgy Tovstonogov at the Gorky Bolshoi Drama Theatre in Leningrad. From 1962 to 1964, Kruusement was the director of the L. Koidula Drama Theatre in Pärnu, and from 1965 to 1991 a film director for Tallinnfilm.

As a film director, Kruusement adapted several novels by Oskar Luts to film: Spring (1969), Summer (1976), and Autumn (1990). Spring was noted as the best Estonian feature film in a poll of Estonian film critics and journalists in 2002. In 1970 the film sold 558,000 tickets in Estonia (of a total population of 1,34 million), and in 1971 8,100,000 tickets in the Soviet Union.

Kruusement died on 9 September 2026, at the age of 98.

== Filmography ==
=== Director ===
- Spring (1969)
- Don Juan in Tallinn (1971)
- Summer (1976)
- A Woman Heats the Sauna (1978)
- Autumn (1990)
