= Oskar Luts =

Estonian writer and playwright

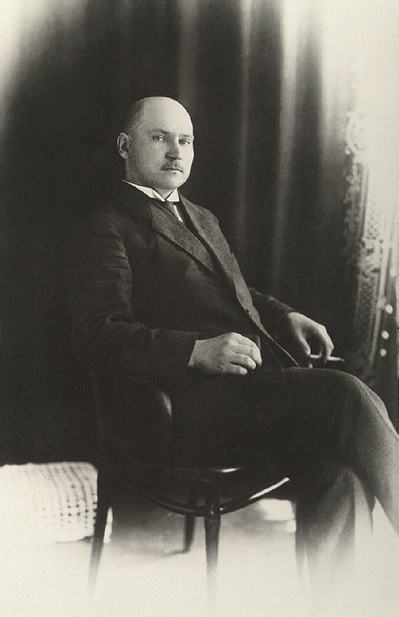
- Born: 7 January 1887 (O.S. 26 December 1886); Järvepera, Estonia (then Governorate of Livonia, Russian Empire)
- Died: 23 March 1953 (aged 66); Tartu, then part of Estonian SSR, Soviet Union
- Resting place: Pauluse Cemetery, Tartu
- Education: Tartu University
- Occupations: Writer; playwright
- Spouse: Valintina Luts (1917–1953)
- Relatives: Theodor Luts (brother)

Oskar Luts (7 January 1887 [O.S. 26 December 1886] – 23 March 1953) was an Estonian writer and playwright.

== Biography ==
Oskar Luts was born into a middle-class family in Järvepera, central Estonia, at that time in the governorate of Livonia (Russian Empire). His younger brother was the film director and cinematographer Theodor Luts. Oskar Luts attended Änkküla village school in 1894. He went to Palamuse Parish school in Jõgeva County, attending from 1895–1899. In 1899–1902 he studied at the Tartu Reaalkool. In 1903, Luts started working as an apothecary apprentice in Tartu and Narva. After passing the apothecary apprentice exams, he went to work in Tallinn (1903). During his military service in Saint Petersburg (1909–1911) he also worked in the apothecary field. He continued this work in Dorpat while studying pharmacy at university.

When World War I started, Oskar Luts was conscripted into the Russian army. He worked as a military pharmacist in Pskov, Warsaw, Daugavpils, Vilnius and in Vitebsk (1915–1918), where he got married.

Oskar Luts was released from military duty for health reasons in the autumn of 1918 and went back to Tartu with his family the same year, where he started working as an apothecary. In 1919–1920 he worked at the university library and then managed a store. In 1922 he started his professional career as a writer.

In 1936, Luts began living in his home on Riia Street in Tartu. This house was converted into a museum in 1964.

Oskar Luts was the first Estonian writer to receive the title of People's Writer of the Estonian SSR. This was awarded to him in 1945.

Oskar Luts is buried in Ropka-Tamme cemetery.

Some streets and buildings in Estonia bear Oskar Luts's name. The Oskar Lutsu Palamuse Gümnaasium in Palamuse was named in honor of Luts.

== Writing ==
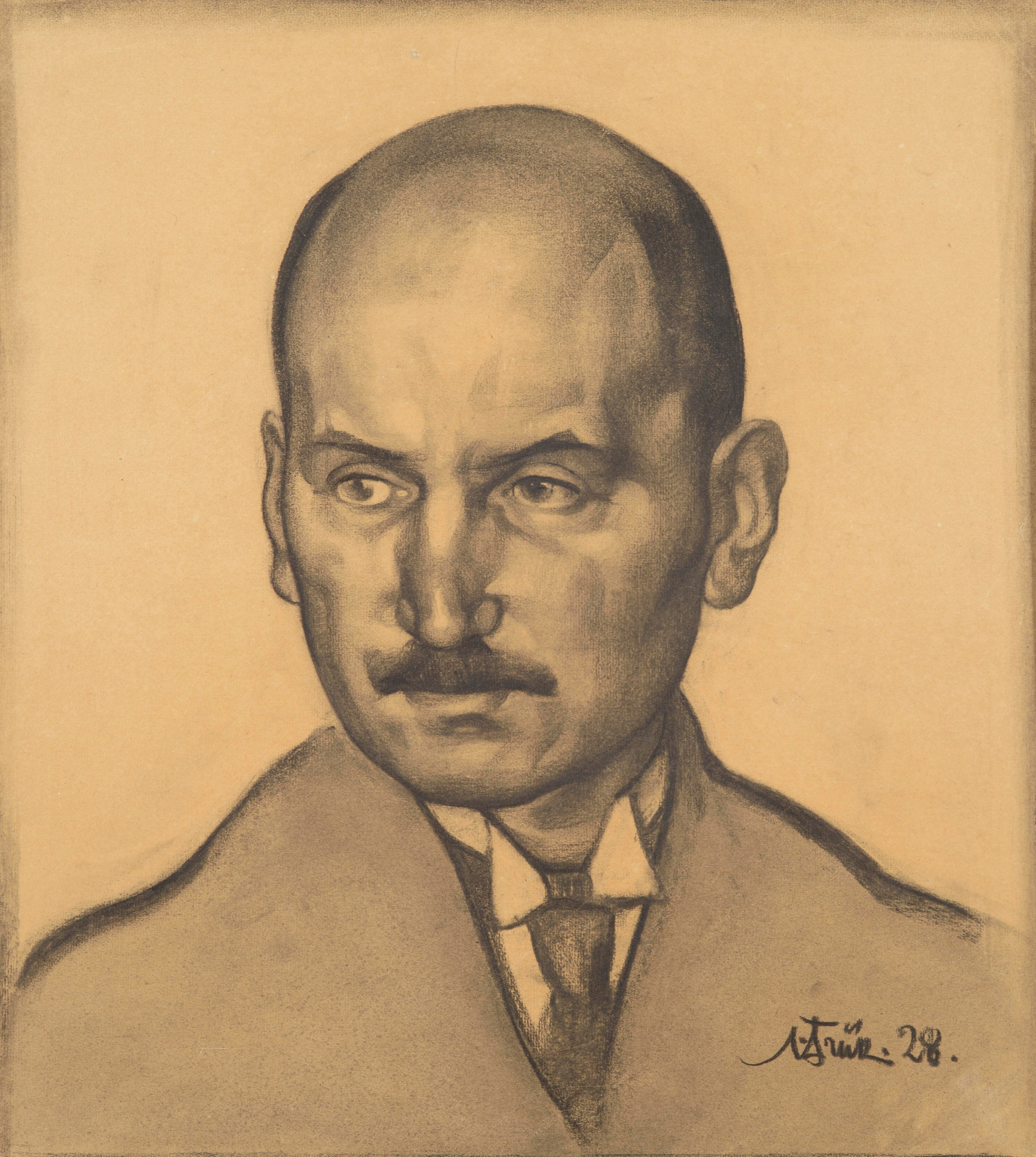
Portrait by Nikolai Triik (1928)

Oskar Luts created his most joyfull literary works in the years before World War I. He wrote several comedies as well as his first novel called Kevade (Spring) (part I 1912, part II 1913). This popular novel portrayed the daily school life of young people in rural Estonia. Kevade proved to be Oskar Luts's most successful and well-known work.

The life of the same characters continued in Luts's novel Suvi (Summer) (I 1918, II 1919), which also became quite popular. However, although subsequent sequels (Tootsi pulm (Toots's Wedding), Argipäev (originally Äripäev, Workdays)) and the novel Sügis (Autumn) (part I – 1938) were written to meet public demand, they did not attain the popularity of his earlier works. After World War I, his works contained less humor and were much gloomier. The second part of Sügis remained in manuscript for four decades, the entire story not being published until 1988.

There are highly popular Estonian films Spring, Summer (1976 film) (based on Suvi and Tootsi pulm) and Autumn (1990 film) (based on Argipäev and Sügis). The films are all produced by Arvo Kruusement.

Oskar Luts also wrote for children, and his most popular children's book is Nukitsamees (1920), which has also been made into a 1981 film (Nukitsamees). The music for Nukitsamees was written by Olav Ehala and is as popular as the film itself.

As a playwright, Oskar Luts is best known for Kapsapea (The Cabbage). The animation "Kapsapea" is based on Oskar Luts' writings. The cartoon is about a large cabbage growing in the garden of an Estonian family. The cabbage eventually causes a sensation in the US, Russia and China.

Oskar Luts' works have been translated into many languages.

== Sources ==
- Oskar Kruus, ed. (1995). Eesti Kirjarahva Leksikon. Eesti Raamat. ISBN 5-450-02357-X.
