= Tallinnfilm =

Film production company based in Estonia

- Industry: Filmmaking; Film distribution
- Founded: 1931
- Headquarters: Tallinn, Estonia
- Key people: Margit Vremmert, CEO
- Website: www.tallinnfilm.ee

Tallinnfilm (Russian: Таллинфильм) is the oldest surviving film studio in Estonia. It was founded as Estonian Culture Film in 1931, and was nationalized in 1940 after Estonia was occupied by the Soviet Union. During the first year of Soviet occupation (1940–1941) Eesti Kultuurfilm was taken over by the Communist Party and renamed Kinokroonika Eesti Stuudio (the Estonian Newsreel Studio). In 1942 during the German occupation the studio was renamed Kinokroonika Tallinna Stuudio (the Tallinn Newsreel Studio) and then renamed again as Tallinna Kinostuudio (the Tallinn Film Studio) in 1947 by the Soviets. The Tallinn Film Studio was renamed Kunstiliste ja Kroonikafilmide Tallinna Kinostuudio (Tallinn Feature and Newsreel Film Studio) in 1954 and in 1963 was renamed again Tallinnfilm.

During the Soviet era, the studio was the only major movie production house in Estonia, responsible for almost all feature-length movies of the time. (Most of the rest were produced by Eesti Televisioon.)

The most notable feature film produced by Tallinnfilm during the Soviet era was Viimne reliikvia (The Last Relic), released in 1969 by Tallinnfilm. The movie set the absolute box office record for the entire Soviet Union at the time by selling 44.9 million tickets. It was distributed by the Soviet film export internationally in more than 60 countries. Spring (1969) (Estonian: Kevade), directed by Arvo Kruusement, sold 558,000 tickets in Estonia (total population 1.34 million) and in 1971 8,100,000 in Soviet Union.

After Estonia regained independence in 1991, Tallinnfilm terminated its production activities and concentrated on the restoration of its film stock and film distribution. Since 2004 Tallinnfilm has acted as an art-house cinema operator. The owner of Tallinnfilm is the Estonian Film Foundation.

== Joonisfilm ==
In 1971, the animation studio (Joonisfilm) was founded by Rein Raamat at Tallinnfilm being one of the Tallinfilm's division.

== See also ==
- List of Estonian films
- Lithuanian Film Studio
- Riga Film Studio
