= Culture of Estonia =

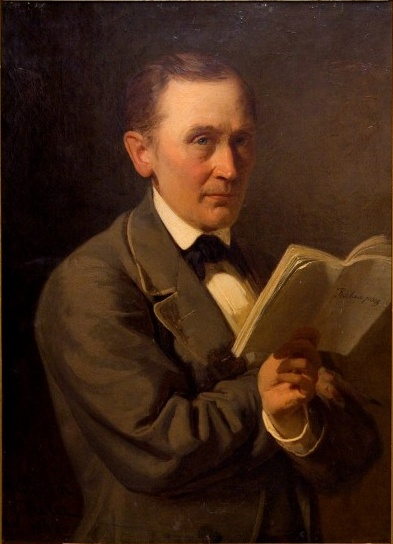
Friedrich Reinhold Kreutzwald, reading his manuscript of the Estonian national epic Kalevipoeg, painting by Estonian artist Johann Köler (1864).

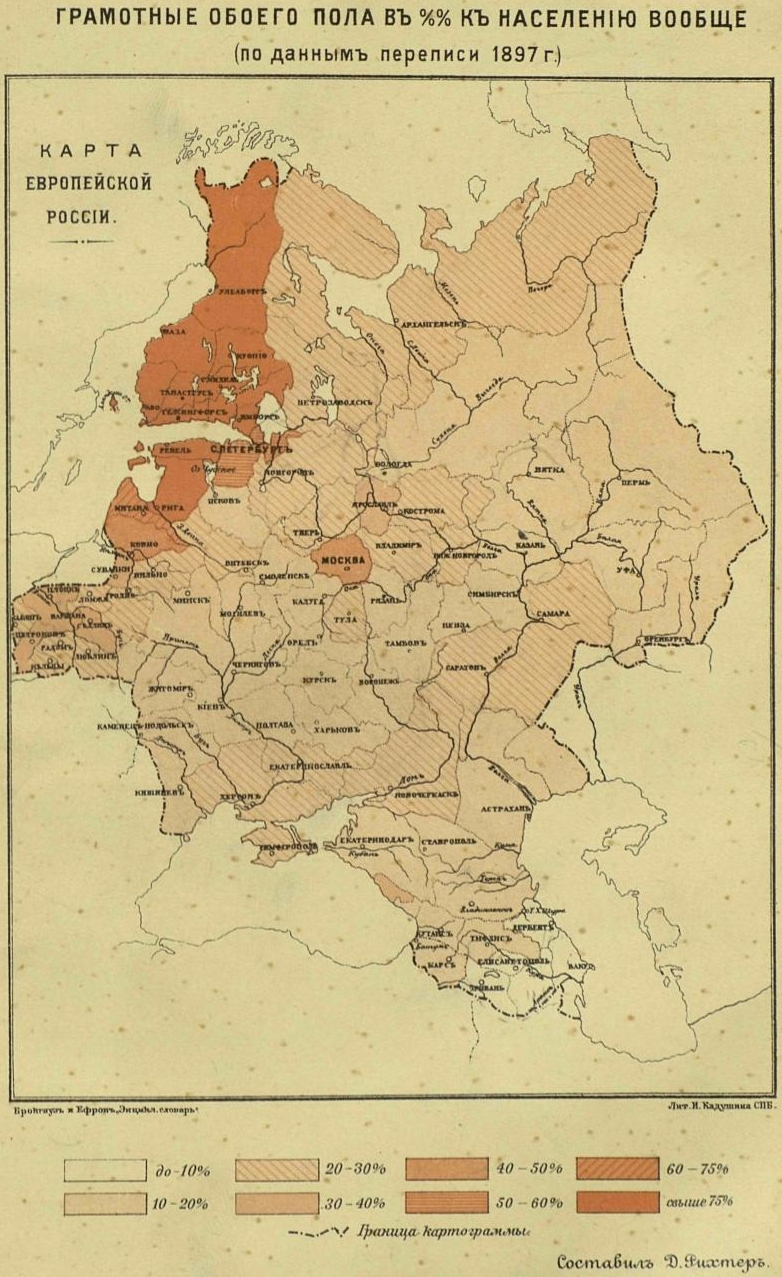
Public education systems founded during prior Swedish rule made Estonia and Finland the two most literate areas of Russian Empire (map of 1897 census literacy data)

The culture of Estonia combines an indigenous heritage, represented by the country's Finnic national language Estonian, with Nordic and German cultural aspects. Over the centuries, the culture of modern Estonia has been significantly influenced by that of the Germanic-speaking world. Due to its history and geography, Estonia's culture has also been influenced by the traditions of the Baltic Germans and Scandinavians as well as the neighbouring Baltic, Slavic, and Finnic peoples.

== Arts ==
=== Literature ===
Though the tradition of creating books in the Estonian language could be said to have existed since the publication of the Wanradt–Koell Catechism in 1535, few notable works of non-ecclesiastical literature were written until the early 1800s, which saw the beginning of an Estonian national romantic movement. This prompted Friedrich Robert Faehlmann to collect Estonian folk poetry, and Friedrich Reinhold Kreutzwald to arrange and publish them as Kalevipoeg, the Estonian national epic.

The first periodical publication in Estonian was Lühhike öppetus (1766–1767). The first Estonian-language newspaper Tarto maa rahva Näddali-Leht was published in 1806.

The era of Estonian national awakening from 1850s onward saw a rapid increase in the number of poets and novelists who wrote in Estonian, notably L. Koidula.

After Estonia became independent in 1918, there was a movement of modernist writers, most famously A. H. Tammsaare and Karl Ristikivi. The Soviet invasion of Estonia during World War II prompted a repression of free speech, opinion and culture in general. The Soviet era was characterized by a large circulation of books and their cheap price, but a rather small number of different titles. After the end of the Soviet rule in 1991, the literature in modern Estonia is in a healthy state, with detective stories in particular enjoying a boom in popularity.

According to a 2018 study, Estonia leads the world in book ownership, on average Estonians own 218 books per house, and 35% own 350 books or more.

=== Music ===
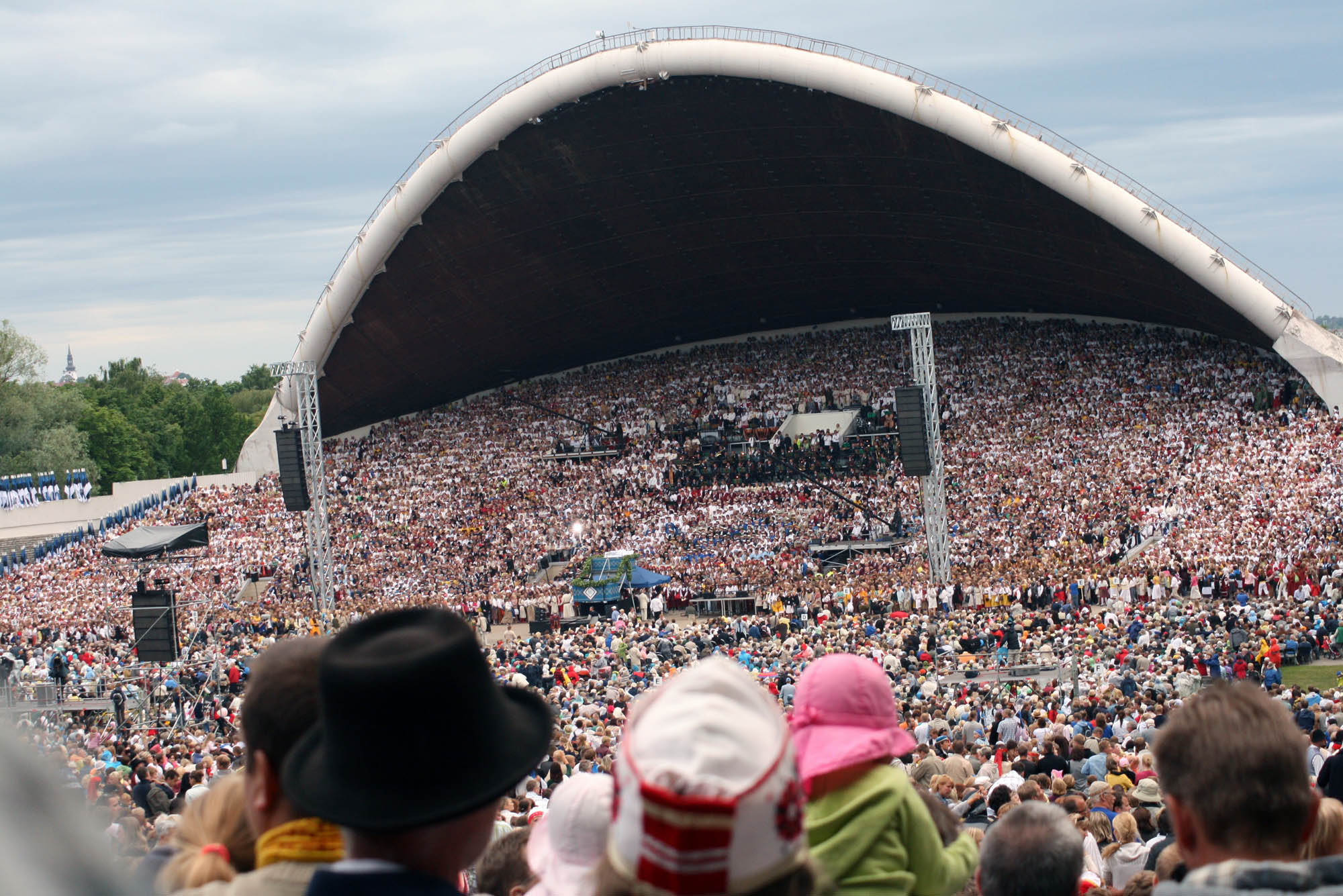
A moment before the opening of the 25th Estonian Song Festival (2009) at the Tallinn Song Festival grounds.

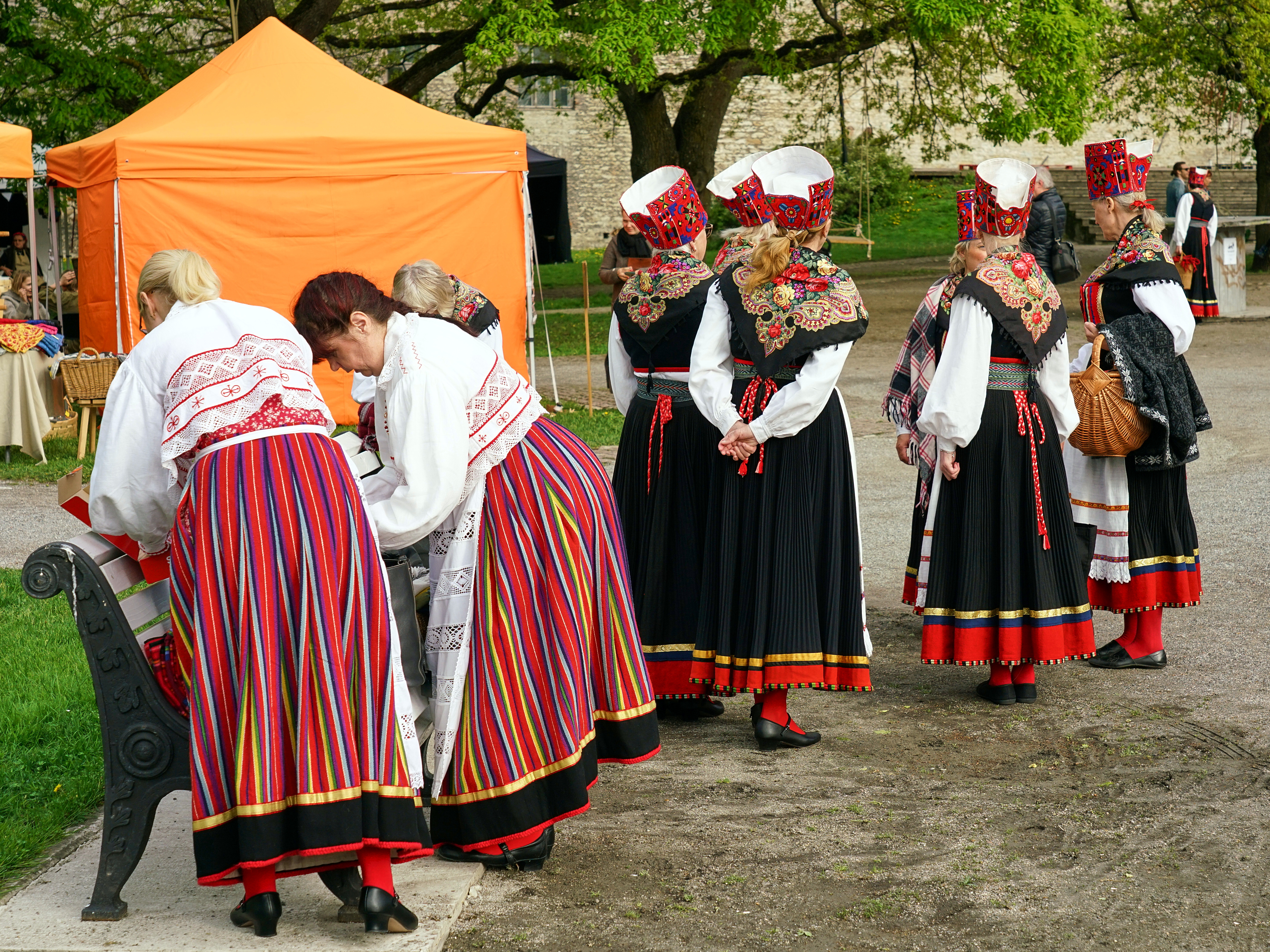
Estonian folk music performers dressed in 19th-century festive folk costumes

The earliest mentioning of Estonian singing and dancing dates back to Saxo Grammaticus' Gesta Danorum (c. 1179). Saxo speaks of Estonian warriors who sang at night while waiting for an epic battle.

The Estonian Song Festival, held every five years since 1869, is now one of the largest choral events in the world and a Masterpiece of the Oral and Intangible Heritage of Humanity. The joint choir of the song festival has comprised more than 30,000 singers performing to an audience of 80,000.

Estonia today is well respected for its musicianship, with the quality education of classical musicians having produced a high proportion of world-class conductors and singers. Estonian art music came to the forefront as a part of the national romantic movement.

The indie folk rock band Ewert and The Two Dragons are among the best known Estonian bands, having had success in Europe and signing with Warner Bros. Records and winning the European Border Breakers Award in 2012. The girl band Vanilla Ninja were also one of the best-known Estonian bands before their hiatus. In addition, artists such as Hortus Musicus, Kerli, Vaiko Eplik & Eliit, Iiris, NOËP, Miljardid and Trad.Attack! have gained popularity outside Estonia.

=== Visual arts ===
The Art Museum of Estonia is the main national museum of visual arts, and has a large collection of Estonian art on permanent display. It was founded on November 17, 1919, but it was not until 1921 that it got its first permanent building – Kadriorg Palace, built in the 18th century. Today the palace is used to display foreign art while a new purpose-built museum houses the main branch of the museum, called Kumu.

Some of the more famous Estonian painters include Adamson-Eric, Johann Köler, Ants Laikmaa, Paul Raud, Evald Okas, Kristjan Raud and Konrad Mägi.

=== Theatre ===
The Theatre of Estonia dates back to 1784, when August von Kotzebue founded an amateur theater company in Tallinn. Most of the plays at the time were comedies for the amusement of the local Baltic German nobility. In 1809, a professional theater company was established with its own building in Tallinn. The repertoire was mostly in German, but plays in Estonian and Russian were also performed.

After centuries of the serfdom that the native Estonian population had fallen into since the Livonian Crusade, serfdom was finally abolished in Estonia in 1816. The first native Estonian musical society, Vanemuine was established in 1865. Lydia Koidula's The Cousin from Saaremaa in 1870, staged by the Vanemuine society, marks the birth of native Estonian theater.

The Vanemuine society was headed by August Wiera from 1878 to 1903. In 1906, a new building was erected for the society, and Karl Menning became director of the theater company. Plays by Western writers such as Henrik Ibsen, Gerhart Hauptmann, Russian Maksim Gorky, and Estonians August Kitzberg, Oskar Luts and Eduard Vilde were staged.

The Estonia Theatre is an opera house and concert hall in Tallinn, Estonia. It was built as a national effort led by Estonian society in 1913, and was opened to the public on August 24. At the time, it was the largest building in Tallinn.

In 2004 there was 20 theaters in Estonia. 46% of the urban population and 40% of rural population visited theaters in 2009.

=== Cinema and broadcasting ===
The film industry in Estonia started in 1896, when the first "moving pictures" were screened in Tallinn. The first movie theater was opened in 1908. The first local documentary was made in 1908 with the production of a newsreel about Swedish King Gustav V’s visit to Tallinn. The first Estonian documentary was created by Johannes Pääsuke in 1912, followed by the short film Karujaht Pärnumaal (Bear Hunt in Pärnumaa) in 1914.

The first full-length feature film was made in 1924, Shadow of the Past directed by Konstantin Märska. Theodor Luts, Noored kotkad (Young Eagles) (1927) is generally regarded as the cornerstone of Estonian cinema.

In the 1960s, the story of Prince Gabriel, by Estonian writer Eduard Bornhöhe, was turned into a movie script by Arvo Valton. Grigori Kromanov was named as the director of Viimne reliikvia (The Last Relic), released in 1969 by Tallinnfilm.

In 1997, the Estonian Film Foundation was founded by the Estonian Ministry of Culture. In 2007, about 10 feature films were made in Estonia, notably Sügisball (2007) by Veiko Õunpuu, receiving, among other awards, Best Director at the Thessaloniki Film Festival and International Film Festival Bratislava, and the Venice Horizons Award at the 64th Venice International Film Festival. Georg (2007), by Peeter Simm, is a movie about the life of legendary Estonian singer Georg Ots.

The most successful Estonian animation director has been Priit Pärn, winner of Grand Prize at the Ottawa International Animation Festival in 1998, for Porgandite öö (Night of the Carrots).

Estonian Television (Eesti Televisioon or ETV) is the national public television station of Estonia. Its first broadcast was on July 19, 1955, and it celebrated its 50th anniversary on July 19, 2005.

=== Architecture ===
The architectural history of Estonia mainly reflects its contemporary development in northern Europe. Worth mentioning is especially the architectural ensemble that makes out the medieval old town of Tallinn, which is on the UNESCO World Heritage List. In addition, the country has several unique, more or less preserved hill forts dating from pre-Christian times, a large number of still intact medieval castles and churches, while the countryside is still shaped by the presence of a vast number of manor houses from earlier centuries.

== Education ==
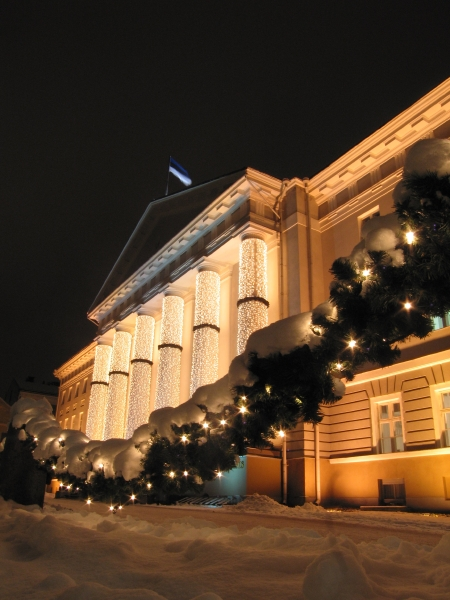
The University of Tartu at Christmas.

The history of formal education in Estonia dates back to the 13th to 14th centuries, when the first monastic and cathedral schools were founded. The first primer in the Estonian language was published in 1575. The oldest university is the University of Tartu, a member of the Coimbra Group, which was established by the Swedish king Gustav II Adolf in 1632. In 1919, university courses were first taught in the Estonian language.

Today, education in Estonia is divided into general, vocational and hobby education. The education system has four levels, which include the pre-school, basic, secondary and higher education. A wide network of schools and supporting educational institutions has been established. The Estonian educational system consists of state and municipal, public and private educational institutions. There are currently 589 schools in Estonia.

Bengt Gottfried Forselius (ca 1660–1688) was the founder of public education in Estonia, author of the first Estonian language ABC-book, and creator of a spelling system that made the teaching and learning of Estonian easier.

== Way of Living ==
=== Historical aspects ===
The area of modern Estonia has historically been inhabited by the same people as today, mostly speakers of Estonian, but some minorities, such as Russians, have immigrated more recently. Although Estonia has been ruled by several different countries, for a long time the elite and ruling class of society were the Baltic Germans, especially the German-speaking nobility. Even though the Baltic Germans enjoyed considerable autonomy under foreign with the administrative language being mostly German, the indigenous population retained their native language and culture.

The formation of a more defined Estonian cultural identity in the modern sense was accelerated in the 19th century, during the period of overall national Romanticism and Nationalism in Europe. Support from the German-speaking Estophiles in upper strata of Estonian society for a separate Estonian identity led to the Estonian Age of Awakening.

Some pagan aspects of culture, such as storytelling traditions, have survived to modern times, and are generally more popular in South Estonia.

=== People ===
Today, Estonian society encourages equality and liberalism, with popular commitment to the ideals of the welfare state, discouraging disparity of wealth and division into social classes. The Protestant work ethic remains a significant cultural staple, regardless of its decline during the Soviet Union era, and free education is a highly prized institution.

The traditional occupation of Estonians, like most Europeans, has been agriculture. Until the first half of the 20th century, Estonia was an agrarian society, but in modern times, Estonians have increasingly embraced an urban lifestyle. In 2013 the main export of the second largest town of Estonia, Tartu, is software. Nonetheless, many Estonians maintain a fondness for a rural lifestyle close to nature, and it is a common custom to visit a summer cottage in the countryside during vacations.

=== Family structure ===
Estonian family life is nowadays centered around anything but the nuclear family. Members of an extended family typically live apart, and youths seek independence and typically move from their parents' residence around the age of twenty.

The divorce rate is close to 60%. Estonia has one of the greatest percentages of single parents in Europe. The average percentage of single parents in Europe is 13% (2009), while in Estonia in 2000, 19% of the families with children under 18 had only one parent. In 2006, the percentage fell to 16%. The decline may be affected by the overall decline in birth rate.

Same-sex relationships are legal in Estonia. The legislation allowing same-sex marriages took effect in 2024.

=== Festivities, holidays, and traditions ===
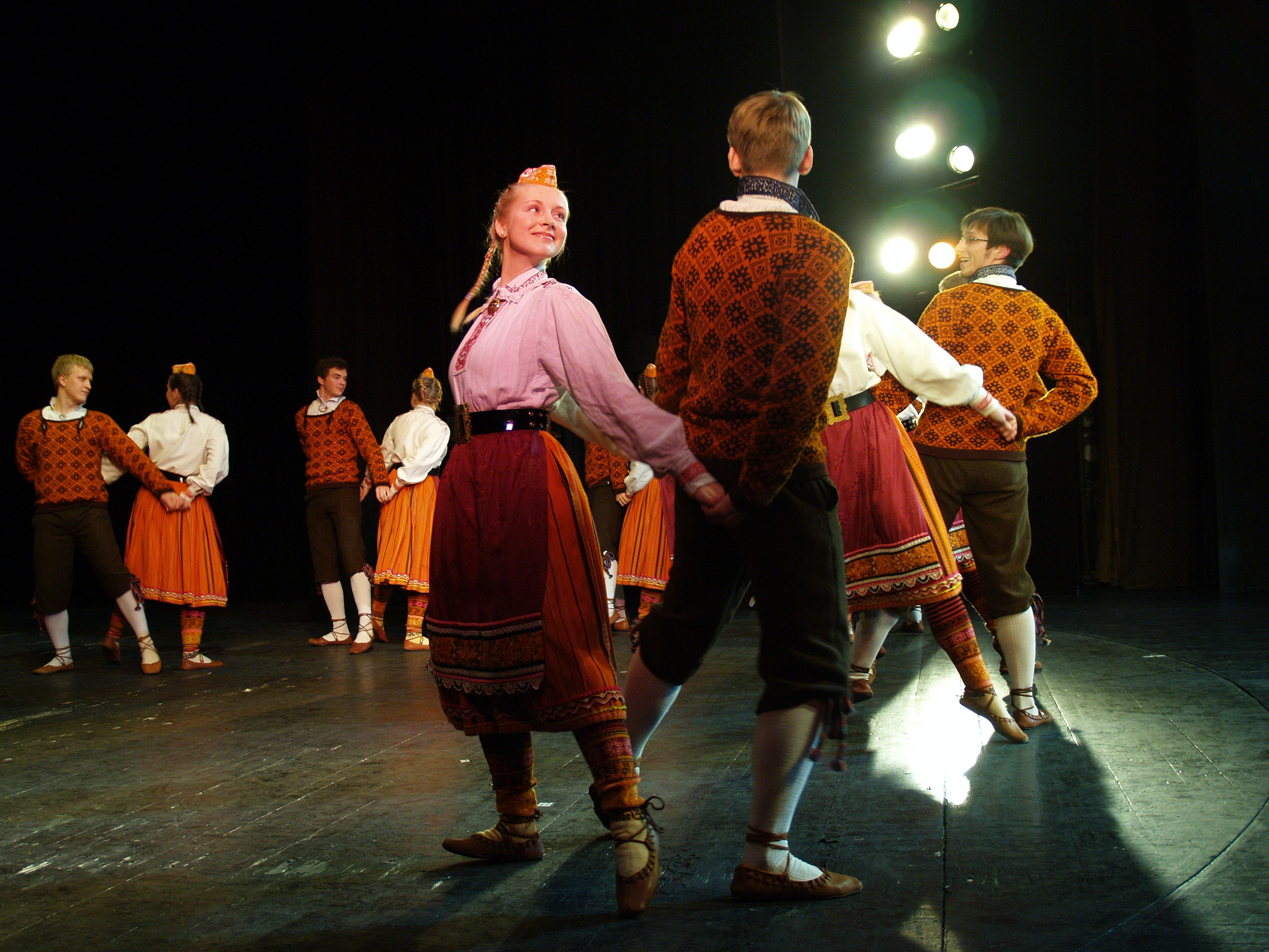
Folk dance is rather popular in Estonia. Dancers of University of Tartu Folk Art Ensemble.

Estonian holidays are mostly based on the Western Christian calendar and Protestant traditions.

Notable among these is Jaanipäev, the Estonian Midsummer, which involves seeking one's way to non-urban environments, burning large bonfires ("jaanituli"), and participating in the drunken revelry of jaaniõhtu.

Part of the "jaaniõhtu" tradition is that almost near the morning, when the bonfire ("jaanilõke") has burned off and only ashes are glowing, a component of Estonian traditional food, potatoes, are dug into the ground, right under the ashes, into the remains of the bonfire. After a few hours, when the potatoes have been cooked under the glowing ashes, the potatoes are dug up, peeled and eaten, while they are still hot.

The midsummer traditions also include different versions of pairing magic, such as collecting a number of different kinds of flowers and putting them under one's pillow, after which one is meant to see one's future spouse in one's dreams. Another "jaaniõhtu" related tradition is the seeking of bugs called "jaaniuss".

The Estonian Christmas, Jõulud, is generally in line with the Northern and Central European traditions of Christmas trees, Advent calendars, and traditional meals, involving a number of dishes that are typically only eaten on Christmas. Christmas is the most extensive, appreciated, and commercialized holiday in Estonia. The Holidays start from December 23, and continue through Christmas Eve (24th) and Christmas Day (25th). In schools and in many workplaces, vacation continues until New Year's Day.

Estonian Independence Day is the 24th of February and a national holiday.

=== Food and drink ===
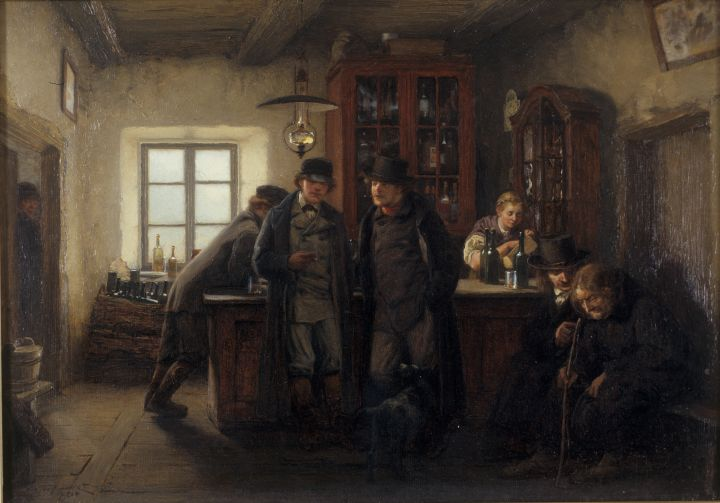
Estonian farmers drinking (vodka) in an inn, by Oskar Hoffmann (painter), 1899.

Historically, the cuisine of Estonia has been simple peasant food, which today is influenced by many countries, thus including many typical international foods. The most typical foods in Estonia are black bread, herring, pork, potatoes, sour cream and other milk-derived products. Estonians themselves have considered blood sausage (verivorst) and sauerkraut (hapukapsas) also as "typical Estonian foods", and these are mostly eaten during Christmas.

=== Estonia as a Nordic country ===
Traditionally, Estonia has been seen as an area of rivalry between western and eastern Europe on many levels. An example of this geopolitical legacy is an exceptional combination of multiple nationally recognized Christian traditions: Western Christianity (the Catholic Church and the Estonian Evangelical Lutheran Church) and Eastern Christianity (the Orthodox Church (the Estonian Apostolic Orthodox Church)). The symbolism of the border or meeting of east and west in Estonia was well illustrated on the reverse side of the 5 krooni note. Like the mainstream cultures in the other Nordic countries, Estonian culture can be seen to build upon ascetic environmental realities and traditional livelihoods, a heritage of comparatively widespread egalitarianism arising out of practical reasons (freedom to roam and universal suffrage), and the ideals of closeness to nature and self-sufficiency.

Many Estonians consider themselves to be Nordic rather than Baltic. As an ethnic group, Estonians are not Balts; the Estonian language is closely related to the Finnish language, rather the Baltic languages, and Estonians are a Finnic people. The northern part of Estonia was part of medieval Denmark during the 13th–14th centuries, being sold to the Teutonic Order after St. George's Night Uprising in 1346. The name of the Estonian capital, Tallinn, is thought to be derived from the Estonian taani linn, meaning 'Danish town' (see Flag of Denmark for details). Parts of Estonia were under Danish rule again in the 16th–17th centuries, before being transferred to Sweden in 1645. Estonia was part of the Swedish Empire from 1561 until 1721. The Swedish era became colloquially known in Estonia as the "good old Swedish times". Swedish ambassador, Mr. Dag Hartelius's speech on the Estonian Independence day, 24 February 2009, where he considered Estonia "A Nordic Country" gathered a lot of attention in the country and was widely considered as a great compliment. Additionally, the foreign trade minister of Finland, Alexander Stubb, has been quoted saying that Estonia is a "Distinct Nordic country".

Beginning from the 14th century, parts of Estonia's northwestern coast and islands were colonized by ethnic Swedes, who later became known as the Estonian Swedes. The majority of Estonia's Swedish population fled to Sweden in 1944, escaping the advancing Soviet Army.

There are many words in Finnish and Estonian that are spelled exactly the same and pronounced almost the same way, but have totally different meanings. Many jokes, including derogatory ones, are based on the differences of the meanings of the words. Both, Finns and Estonians, tend to have, create and understand those jokes. However, Finnish and Estonian are sufficiently different languages that it is not possible for a native speaker of one of the languages to speak nor sufficiently comprehend the other language without explicitly learning the other language. Finns tend to have difficulties pronouncing the Estonian letter "õ" and Estonians tend to get "revealed" to Finns by their Estonian accent. For some reason, probably due to the greater amount of loan-words and expressions from other languages, native Estonians, who have not learned Finnish, tend to comprehend and acquire Finnish more easily than native Finns comprehend Estonian.

== See also ==
- Estonian Song Festival
- Sport in Estonia
- List of museums in Estonia
- Estonian mythology
- Public holidays in Estonia
- Estonian cuisine
- Religion in Estonia
- Women in Estonia
