= Timeline of early Estonian publications =

This is the timeline of notable early Estonian publications, along with links to the articles discussing them.

Time	Publication	Person	Remarks
1535	Wanradt–Koell Catechism	by Simon Wanradt and Johann Koell	the oldest (partially) preserved Estonian language book, printed in Wittenberg
1524–1532	Kullamaa Manuscript		the oldest source containing longer texts in Estonian
1622	Agenda Parva	unknown	the oldest book which in some places uses South Estonian
1633	Historische Prodromus des Lieffländischen Rechtens und Reglements	by Friedrich Menius	first book published in Estonia
1641, 1649	Leyen Spiegel	by Heinrich Stahl	first book printed in Estonia and using Estonian. This sermon book, published in two volumes, ran parallel in German and Estonian.
1675–1676	Ordinari Freytags Post-Zeitung	edited by Christoph Brendenken	first newspaper published in Estonia, in German
1739	a Bible	by Jacob Johann Köhler	the first printing of Estonian translation of the Bible
1766–1767	Lühhike öppetus	edited by Peter Ernst Wilde, translated by August Wilhelm Hupel	a medical manual; the first Estonian-language periodic publication
1795	an ABC	by Otto Wilhelm Masing	the oldest known preserved Estonian primer
1807	Tarto maa rahva Näddali-Leht	?	the first Estonian-language newspaper
1813–1832	Beiträge zur genauern Kenntniß der ehstnischen Sprache	edited by Johann Heinrich Rosenplänter	the first scientific journal discussing Estonian
1821–1823	Marahva Näddala-Leht	edited by Otto Wilhelm Masing	an early weekly newspaper
1857	Postimees established	edited by Johann Voldemar Jannsen	the oldest still published Estonian-language newspaper
1857–1861	Kalevipoeg	by Friedrich Reinhold Kreutzwald	printed piece-by-piece as an academic publication of the Õpetatud Eesti Selts
1891	Postimees goes daily	?	the first Estonian-language daily newspaper
