= Hans Kaldoja =

Estonian actor (1942–2017)

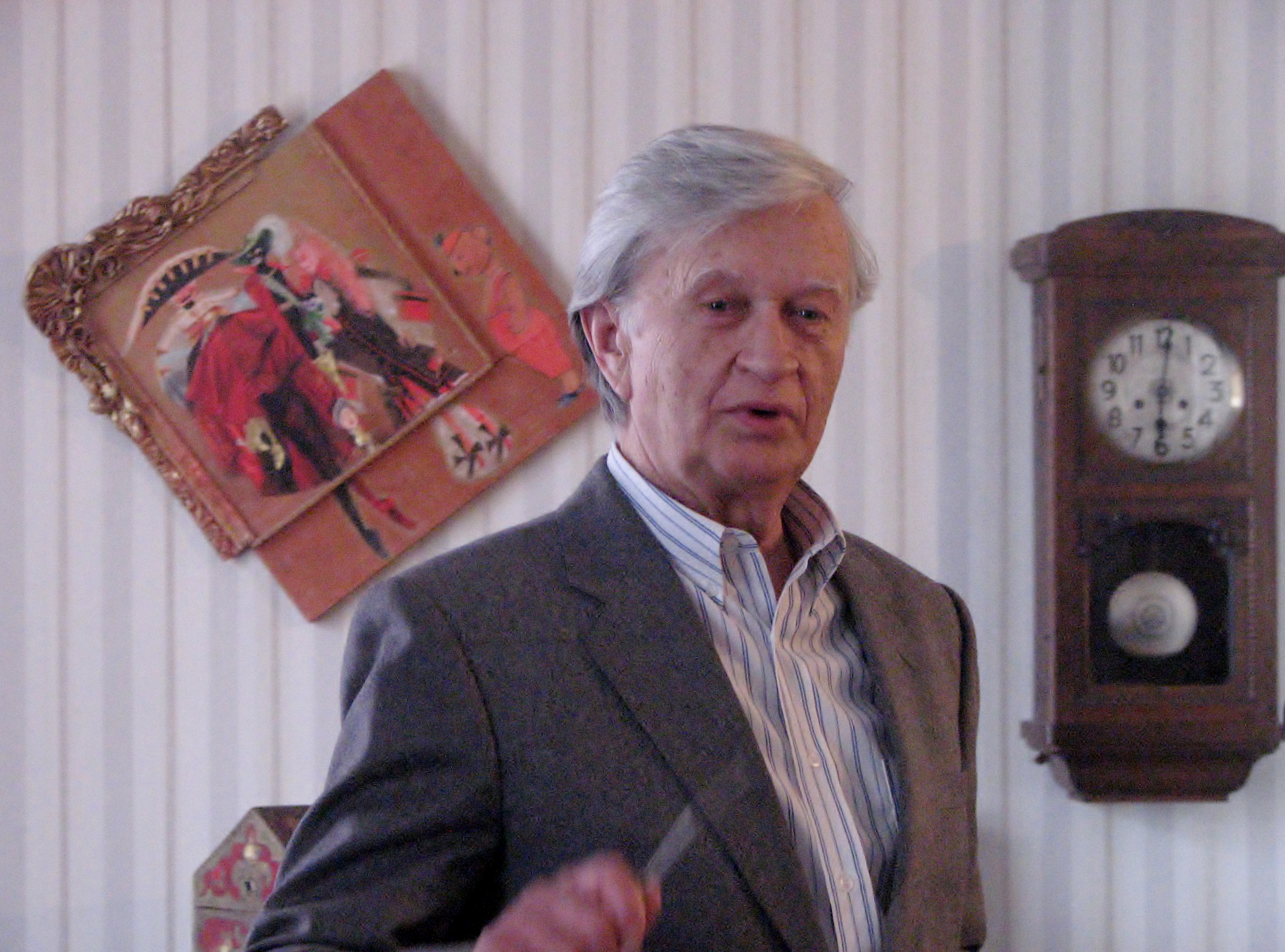
- Kaldoja in 2013
- Born: 15 November 1942; Igavere, Generalbezirk Estland, Reichskommissariat Ostland
- Died: 1 December 2017 (aged 75); Tallinn, Estonia
- Occupation: Actor
- Years active: 1965–2014
- Spouses: Maret Kristal (m. 1965; div. 1970) Rita Raave (m. 1977; div. 2004)
- Children: 1

Hans Kaldoja (15 November 1942 – 1 December 2017) was an Estonian stage, television, film, and radio voice actor whose career began in the mid-1960s. Kaldoja was employed at the Estonian Drama Theatre for twenty-seven years; from 1965 until 1992, appearing in over one hundred theatre roles, before becoming a freelance actor. He has also recorded nearly two hundred audiobooks for the Estonian Library for the Blind.

== Early life and education ==
Hans Kaldoja was the older of twos sons born to Villem and Vanda Kaldoja (née Veliste) in the small village of Igavere in Harju County during the German occupation of Estonia in World War II. He had one older half-sibling from his father's previous marriage. Following the Soviet re-occupation and annexation of Estonia in 1944, his father was arrested and deported by Soviet authorities, but was later able to return to the family. He spent most of his youth growing up in the Kesklinn, Tallinn subdistrict of Kadriorg and developed an early interest in theatre after attending productions at the Noorus folk theatre in Tallinn.

== Career ==
=== Stage ===
After graduating from secondary school, Kaldoja enrolled at the Viktor Kingissepp Tallinn State Academic Drama Theatre studio (now, the Estonian Drama Theatre) in 1965 to study under instruction of actor, director, and stage pedagogue Voldemar Panso. He performed in stage roles with the theatre until graduating in 1969, then was offered an engagement with the theatre that lasted until 1992, when he left to become a freelance actor.

Some of his more notable stage roles at the Estonian Drama Theatre include those in works by such varied international playwrights and authors as: Edvard Radzinsky, Johann Wolfgang von Goethe, William Shakespeare, Maxim Gorky, Friedrich Schiller, Alexander Vampilov, Aleksandrs Čaks, Maurice Maeterlinck, Edward Bond, Robert Lamoureux, and Françoise Sagan. Notable roles in works by Estonian playwrights and authors include those by Boris Kabur, Egon Rannet, Oskar Luts, A. H. Tammsaare, Aino Kallas, Mats Traat, Jaan Kruusvall, Rein Saluri, and Artur Adson. During his twenty-seven year engagement at the theatre, Kaldoja performed in nearly one-hundred stage roles.

Following his departure from the Estonian Drama Theatre, Kaldoja performed in selected roles at various theatres throughout Estonia, including the Estonian National Opera, Vaba Lava, VAT Theatre, Pärimusteater Loomine, and R.A.A.A.M in Tallinn, and the Kuressaare City Theatre.

=== Television ===
During the 1970s, Kaldoja began appearing in a number of television plays broadcast on Eesti Televisioon (ETV). Some of his more notable roles included Lord Windermere in a 1974 televised production of Oscar Wilde's Lady Windermere's Fan, Ernst Lachmann in Gerhart Hauptmann's Michael Kramer in 1976, Heino Maarits in Raimond Kaugver's Kuldlõige in 1977, and as Vorstimeister in a 1980 production of Thorbjørn Egner's children's book When the Robbers Came to Cardamom Town.

In 1981, he appeared in the two-part Tõnis Kask directed Eesti Telefilm historical television film Kaks päeva Viktor Kingissepa elust, based on the life of Estonian communist politician Viktor Kingissepp. Other notable television roles were as Dr. Saar, in the 1995 Eesti Televisioon (ETV) Vilja Palm directed historical miniseries Wikmani poisid, based on the 1988 novel of the same name by Jaan Kross; Erik Kiin, in the 1995–2001 EVTV/TV3 drama V.E.R.I.; the Psychologist, in the 1998–2001 TV3 domestic drama Kired; Ilmar, in the 2012–2013 Kanal 2 supernatural horror series Süvahavva; and Doctor Reinup, in the 2012 ETV thriller series Alpimaja.

In 2005, Kaldoja appeared in the role of Aivo Barbo in the Ilmar Raag directed ETV television drama film August 1991, which was a dramatisation of the failed Soviet attempt to suppress Estonia's push to regain independence.

From 2009 until 2011, Kaldoja was a cohost on the retooled magazine television and talk programme for the elderly, Prillitoos, which was broadcast on ETV.

=== Film ===
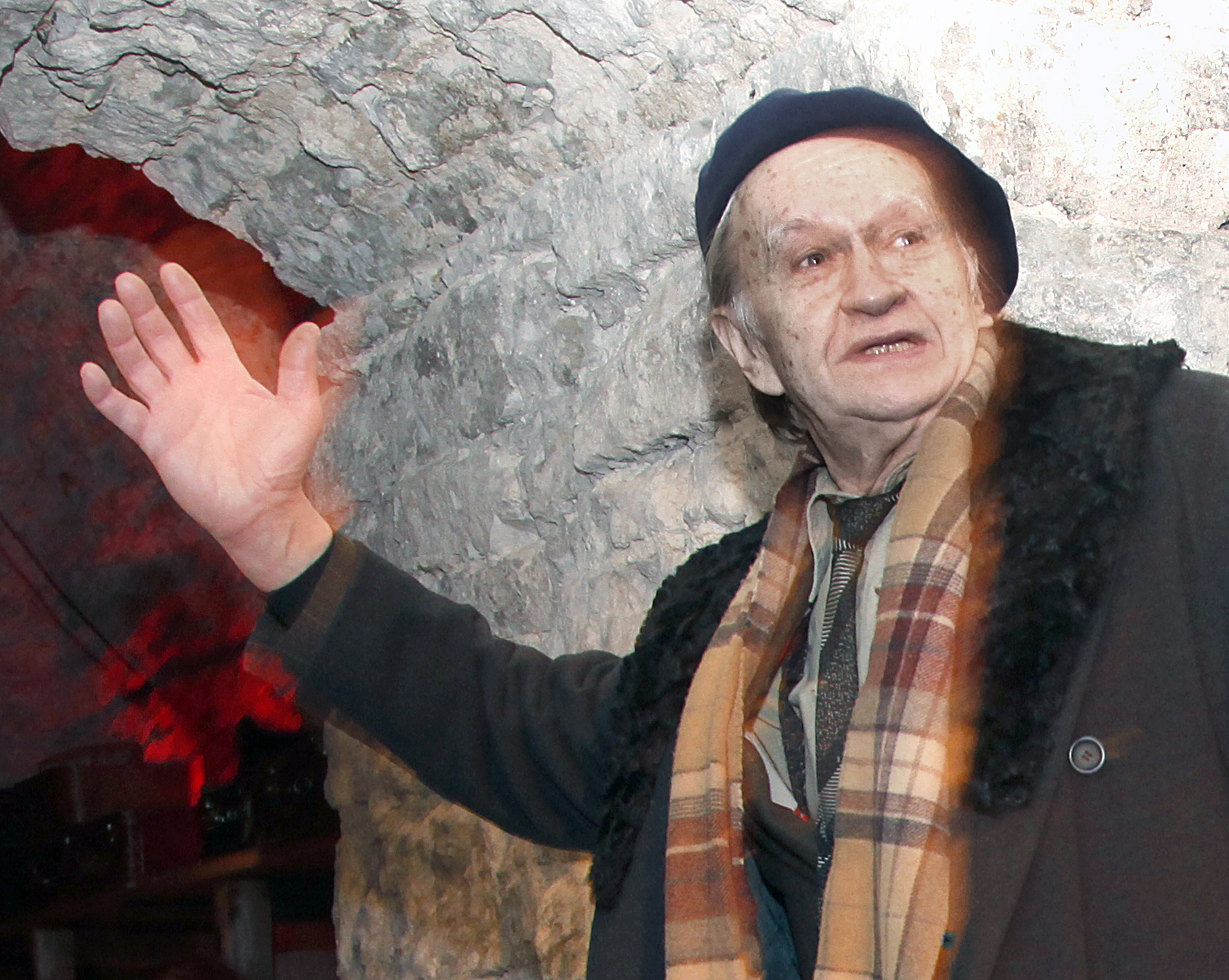
Kaldoja in 2014

In 1965, while still a student at Viktor Kingissepp Tallinn State Academic Drama Theatre (TRA Draamateater), Kaldoja appeared in minor roles credited simply as "young man" in two romantic musical film shorts, Kolmest kaheteistkümneni and Autostopp, both directed by Virve Aruoja and Astrid Lepa. His first significant film role was that of Raudnask in the 1968 Jüri Müür directed Tallinnfilm World War II period drama Inimesed sõdurisinelis, based on the novellas Enn Kalmu kaks mina (inimesed sodurisinelis) (1960) and Teosed: Enn Kalmu kaks mina (1961) by Paul Kuusberg. The following year, he had an uncredited role as a monk in the Grigori Kromanov directed Tallinnfilm medieval adventure feature film Viimne reliikvia, adapted from the 1893 novella Vürst Gabriel ehk Pirita kloostri viimsed päevad by Eduard Bornhöhe.

In 1973, he appeared as Sepp's assistant in the Madis Ojamaa directed historical drama Verekivi. In 1986, he appeared in the small role of Member of the III Military Court in the Viktor Kingissepp biopic Saja aasta pärast mais, directed by Kaljo Kiisk and penned by Mati Unt for Tallinnfilm.

=== Voice actor and audiobooks ===
Kaldoja also had a lengthy career as voice actor in film, television, and radio. He voiced a number of characters in animated films and television series, and narrated several television programmes for Eesti Televisioon. He frequently appeared on the Eesti Raadio RAMETO radio series Meelejahutaja.

The Estonian Public Broadcasting Corporation's (Eesti Rahvusringhääling, or ERR) sound library has nearly 700 audio recordings with Kaldoja's participation, including 130 audio plays, 62 serials, 116 Meelejahutaja sketches, and various narrated stories and poetry recitations.

Kaldoja also had a prolific career as a narrator of audiobooks. The Estonian Library for the Blind has more than 180 audiobooks and articles in its collection read by Kaldoja.

In 2012, he was awarded the Radio Theatre Actor Award, given annually by Eesti Rahvusringhääling-Eesti Raadio to a notable actor for the best performance of the past season in an audio play and/or for fruitful work with artistic word on the radio.

Kaldoja became a member of the Estonian Theatre Association in 1969, and the Estonian Actors' Union in 1994.

== Personal life and death ==
In 1965, Hans Kaldoja married dancer, choreographer, and pantomime artist Maret Kristal. The couple divorced in 1970. In 1977, he wed actress Rita Raave. They had a son, Indrek, in 1983. They divorced in 2004.

Kaldoja was interested in nature and travel. In 1974, he spent the summer in the Kamchatka Peninsula's Valley of Geysers in the Russian Far East, with close friend, actor and theatre director Raivo Trass. The two had become friends when they shared a dressing room at the Estonian Drama Theatre in 1968. The following year, they trekked across the Pamir Mountains.

Hans Kaldoja died in Tallinn, aged 75, following a brief illness. His funeral was held on 9 December 2017 in Pärnamäe. He was cremated.
