= Kuningamäe =

Village in Estonia

- Village
- Location in Estonia
- Coordinates: 58°38′57″N 25°56′14″E
- Country: Estonia
- County: Jõgeva County
- Municipality: Põltsamaa Parish

Population (2010)
  - Total: 84

Kuningamäe is a village in Põltsamaa Parish, Jõgeva County, Estonia. It is located just west of the town of Põltsamaa. Kuningamäe has a populstion of 84 (as of 2010).

Earlier Kuningamäe was a location of Vana-Põltsamaa Manor's cattle manor Königsberg, which has also been associated with the residence of Duke Magnus. In 1766 Johann Woldemar von Lauw established a hospital and pharmacy in Kuningamäe. The director Peter Ernst Wilde founded a medical school and a print shop where he published the first Estonian periodical Lühhike öppetus and the first Estonian medical manual Arsti ramat.
