= Eili Sild =

Estonian actress (1942–2026)

- Born: 26 October 1942; Tallinn, German-occupied Estonia
- Died: 13 March 2026 (aged 83)
- Other names: Eili Torga; Eili Sild-Torga
- Occupation: Actress
- Years active: 1962–2026
- Spouse: Heino Torga (m. 1967; died 2012)
- Children: 1

Eili Sild (26 October 1942 – 13 March 2026) was an Estonian stage, film, television and radio actress whose career began on the theatre stage in the early 1960s and spanned over fifty years.

== Early life and education ==
Eili Sild was born in Tallinn on 26 October 1942. She attended the Tallinn 7th Secondary School (now, the Tallinn English College), graduating in 1961. In 1963, she graduated from the Tallinn Feature and Newsreel Film Studio (now, Tallinnfilm) and afterwards studied acting at the Lunacharsky State Institute for Theatre Arts (GITIS) (now, the Russian Academy of Theatre Arts) in Moscow, where she graduated in 1976.

== Stage career ==
In 1963, shortly after graduating from the Tallinn Feature and Newsreel Film Studio, Sild began an engagement as an actress at the Ugala theatre in Viljandi. She remained an actress with the Ugala (with some intermissions) until 1980. Afterward, she joined the Vanalinnastuudio theatre (Old Town Studio theatre) in Tallinn in 1980, leaving in 1996 and becoming a freelance actress.

Notable performances during her years onstage as a theatre actress include those in works by such varied authors and playwrights as Rainis, Venta Vīgante, Boris Kabur, Gunnars Priede, Oskar Luts, Eduard Vilde, Aldo Nicolaj, Erskine Caldwell, Maxim Gorky, Astrid Lindgren, August Jakobson, Ardi Liives, Hella Wuolijoki, Fyodor Dostoyevsky, Molière, Henrik Ibsen, and Terence Rattigan.

Sild also performed onstage at many other theatres throughout Estonia, including the Vanemuine in Tartu, the Tallinn City Theatre and the Vana Baskini Teater (Old [Roman] Baskin's Theatre).

== Television and radio career ==
Eili Sild's first prominent television appearance was the character Mari in the 1965 feature-length drama Külmale maale directed by Ants Kivirähk and Valdur Himbek for Eesti Telefilm. The television film was based on the 1896 novel of the same name by the Estonian author Eduard Vilde. Following this, Sild concentrated on her stage career and did not appear in television roles until the early 2000s after she had become a freelance actress.

In 2001 and 2002, Sild appeared as Ellen in two episodes of the popular long-running Eesti Televisioon (ETV) drama Õnne 13 in 2001 and 2002. In 2010, she made an appearance on an episode of the Kanal 2 crime drama series Kelgukoerad, and the same year she had a small role on the TV3 comedy-crime series Kättemaksukontor.

Sild also had a prolific career as a radio theatre actress and as a narrator and presenter. She appeared frequently on Eesti Rahvusringhääling (ERR) in radio plays and reading monologues and short stories by authors such as A. H. Tammsaare, Lilli Promet, and Jaan Kaplinski, among many others.

== Film career ==
Eili Sild's first substantial film role was that of Maia in the 1964 black-and-white drama Põrgupõhja uus Vanapagan directed by Grigori Kromanov and Jüri Müür for Tallinnfilm, based on the multi-layered 1939 novel of the same name by A. H. Tammsaare. This was followed in 1966 by the drama Kirjad Sõgedate külast directed by Jüri Müür, also for Tallinnfilm, and based on several works by the author Juhan Smuul.

In 1977, Sild was cast in another small role as a housewife in the Tallinnfilm period piece drama Reigi õpetaja directed by Jüri Müür, which was based on the 1926 novel Reigin Pappi (The Pastor of Reigi) by the Finnish author Aino Kallas.

After a ten-year absence, Eili Sild returned to the screen in the role of a witch in the 1987 Tallinnfilm Metsluiged, directed by Helle Karis. The film was an adaptation of Hans Christian Andersen's 1838 fairy tale The Wild Swans. The following year, she appeared in a two minor roles; the Tallinnfilm dramatic short Vernanda directed by Roman Baskin, based on Arvo Valton's 1968 short story Vernanda leib; and in the short dramatic film Nõid directed by Elo Tust, starring Ülle Kaljuste and Enn Kraam. Both film shorts were produced for Tallinnfilm.

In 1992, Sild made a small appearance in the family comedy Lammas all paremas nurgas directed by Lembit Ulfsak, which follows the adventures of two young boys who discover a painting that was believed to be lost long ago. The following year, she appeared in another small role in the Finnish–Estonian comedy Hysteria, directed by Pekka Karjalainen.

In 2012, Sild returned to the screen as the character Ilme in the dramatic short Vaba maa directed by Anna Hints, opposite the actors Rita Raave and Raivo Trass.

== Personal life and death ==
Eili Sild married the actor and director Heino Torga. The couple remained married until his death in 2012. They had one child, daughter Mari Torga, who became a television presenter and theatre manager and director. Her nephew was the poet and writer Ivar Sild.

Sild died on 13 March 2026, at the age of 82.
