= Aino Talvi =

Estonian actress and vocalist

- Born: Aino Müller; 6 February 1909; Tartu, Governorate of Livonia, Russian Empire
- Died: 12 March 1992 (aged 83); Tallinn, Estonia
- Other names: Aino Oja; Aino Pindam
- Occupation: Actress
- Years active: 1928 – 1992
- Spouse(s): Richard Oja (1928 – 1938); Rein Pindam (c. 1940 – 1992)
- Children: Rein Pindam Jr. (1942 – 1999)

Aino Talvi (6 February 1909 – 12 March 1992) was an Estonian stage, film, and radio actress and singer whose career spanned over sixty years.

== Early life ==
Aino Talvi was born Aino Müller in Tartu to police constable August Müller and Miili Müller (née Lauson). She attended school at the Society of Education of Estonian Youth, Tartu Girls' Grammar School (now the Miina Härma Gymnasium) before the family moved to Mustvee in 1921. In 1922, Talvi's mother Miili died of pneumonia and the remaining family members moved back to Tartu, where she completed secondary school in 1927. Her father August would later remarry and change his surname to the more Estonian sounding Müür.

== Stage career ==
Aino Talvi (then still using the surname Müller) made her stage debut at the Vanemuine theatre in Tartu as a singer in the opera choir in 1929. Shortly afterwards, she began using the stage name Aino Talvi. She would remain a singer and actress at the Vanemuine until 1935 when she joined the Estonian Drama Theatre in Tallinn. Talvi would remain at the Estonian Drama Theatre until 1944 when she left to join the Estonia Theatre for five years before returning in 1949. Following her return, she would remain an actress with the Estonian Drama Theatre until 1984. Afterwards, she would become a freelance actress.

Talvi's career as a stage actress spanned over sixty years and she appeared in numerous theatre productions. Some of her most memorable roles include:

- Ello and Liis, August Gailit's Toomas Nipernaadi (1936)
- Angelique, Molière's The Imaginary Invalid (1936)
- Mari, August Kitzberg's Libahunt (1941)
- Nora, Henrik Ibsen's A Doll's House (1943)
- Roxanne, Edmond Rostand's Cyrano de Bergerac (1947)
- Olga, Anton Chekhov's Three Sisters (1947)
- Desdemona, William Shakespeare's Othello (1949)
- Helena (Jelena), Anton Chekhov's Uncle Vanya (1951)
- Mari, A. H. Tammsaare's Tõde ja õigus (1951, 1955 and 1958)
- Cleopatra, William Shakespeare's Antony and Cleopatra (1955)
- Commissar, Vsevolod Vishnevsky's An Optimistic Tragedy (1957)
- Mother Courage, Bertolt Brecht's Mother Courage and Her Children (1962)
- The Widow, Juhan Smuul's, Polkovniku lesk ehk Arstid ei tea midagi (1966)
- Bernarda Alba, Federico García Lorca's The House of Bernarda Alba (1966)
- Mary Cavan Tyrone, Eugene O'Neill's Long Day's Journey into Night (1971)

== Film and radio career ==
Aino Talvi made her screen debut in the role of Eeva Miilas in the 1947 Herbert Rappaport directed Soviet-Estonian language drama film Elu tsitadellis (English: Life in a Citadel) for Lenfilm. Elu tsitadellis was the first post-World War II Estonian feature film following the annexation of Estonia into the Soviet Union. Based on the 1946 play of the same name by Estonian author and communist politician August Jakobson, the plot largely revolves around the arrival of the Soviet Army following the German occupation of Estonia in 1944 and justice being meted out to Estonians who had collaborated with German occupying forces. The film ends with jubilant Estonians celebrating their "liberation" and inclusion into the Soviet Union and accepting communist ideology.

In 1956, Talvi appeared as Säinas in the Viktor Nevežin directed comedy-drama film Tagahoovis for Tallinna Kinostuudio. The film was an adaptation of the 1933 Oskar Luts' 1933 story of the same name. In 1959, Talvi had a small role as Hilda's mother in the Igor Yeltsov directed crime-drama Kutsumata külalised, also for Tallinna Kinostuudio. In 1969, she dubbed the voice for Latvian actress Elza Radziņa's character in the Grigori Kromanov directed Estonian language historical drama film Viimne reliikvia. In 1983, she appeared in another small role in the Valentin Kuik directed Tallinnfilm biopic Georg, chronicling the life of Estonian strongman and wrestler Georg Lurich.

Aino Talvi also performed in a number of radio plays. Arguably the most memorable include Anton Chekhov's The Cherry Orchard in 1948, and Henrik Ibsen's The Wild Duck in 1959.

== Personal life ==
Aino Talvi married Richard Oja in 1928. The marriage lasted ten years and the couple divorced in 1938. In 1940, she married Rein Pindam (1917–1993) and the couple had a son, Rein Pindam Jr. (1942–1999). Talvi and Pindam remained married until her death in 1992 at age 83. Talvi was buried in Tallinn's Metsakalmistu cemetery.

== Acknowledgements ==
- State Prize of the Estonian Soviet Socialist Republic (1950)
- Merited Artist of the Estonian Soviet Socialist Republic (1952)
- People's Artist of the Estonian Soviet Socialist Republic (1956)
- Order of Lenin (1956)
- People's Artist of the USSR (1966)
