= Endel =

Estonian male given name

- Gender: Male
- Language: Estonian
- Name day: 3 May

Origin
- Region of origin: Estonia

Other names
- Related names: Endo

Endel is an Estonian masculine given name and may refer to:

- Endel Aruja (1911-2008), Estonian physicist active in Canada
- Endel Eero (1930–2006), Estonian politician
- Endel Edasi (1929–2002), Estonian swimmer
- Endel Kiisa (born 1937), Estonian motorcycle rider
- Endel Laas (1915- 2009), Estonian forest scientist and professor
- Endel Lippmaa (1930-2015), Estonian physicist, academian and politician
- Endel Nelis (1925–1993), Estonian fencer and fencing coach
- Endel Nirk (1925–2018), Estonian literary scientist, critic and writer
- Endel Pärn (1914–1990), Estonian actor and singer
- Endel Press (1929–1982), Estonian swimmer
- Endel Puusepp (1909–1996), Estonian Soviet World War II pilot
- Endel Ratas (1938–2006), Estonian freedom fighter and politician
- Endel Redlich (1923–1949), Estonian partisan
- Endel Rikand (1906–1944), Estonian sport shooter
- Endel Rivers (born 1959), Estonian-Australian musician, composer and music producer
- Endel Ruberg (1917–1989), Estonian-born Canadian artist
- Endel Taniloo (1923–2019), Estonian sculptor
- Endel Tulving (1927–2023), Estonian-born Canadian experimental psychologist and cognitive neuroscientist
