= Ingrīda Andriņa =

Latvian actress (1944–2015)

- Born: 23 June 1944; Riga, Generalbezirk Lettland, Reichskommissariat Ostland
- Died: 17 September 2015 (aged 71); Riga, Latvia
- Occupation: Actress
- Years active: 1967–2015

Ingrīda Andriņa (23 June 1944 – 17 September 2015) was a Latvian stage and film actress.

== Biography ==
Born in Riga, Andriņa graduated from the All-Union State Institute of Cinematography in Moscow in 1967 and began working at the Latvian National Theatre. From 1966, she began appearing in films.

Andriņa is best possibly recalled internationally for her role as Agnes von Mönnikhusen in the 1969 Soviet Estonian language film Viimne reliikvia, directed by Grigori Kromanov.

Throughout her film career, Andriņa performed in Latvian, Russian, Estonian, Azerbaijani, and Georgian-language films. Her last appearance was in the 2014 Latvian film Džimlai Rudis rallallā.

Andriņa died unexpectedly in 2015 at the age of 71, and was interred at the Riga Forest Cemetery.

== Selected filmography ==
- Viimne reliikvia (1969)
- Liberation, film series (1972)
- Unfinished Supper (1979)
- The Trust That Has Burst, television miniseries (1984)
- Džimlai rūdi rallallā (2014)
