= Peter Ernest =

Peter Ernest may refer to:

- Peter Ernst I von Mansfeld-Vorderort (1517–1604), Spanish army commander
- Peter Ernst Wilde (1732–1785), Baltic German physician and Estophile
- Peter Ernest Naktenis (1914–2007), American baseball player
