= Lahe =

Lahe may refer to:

== People ==
- Hanah Lahe (born 1999), Estonian climate activist and politician

== Places ==
- Lahe, Burma, town in Naga Hills, Sagaing Division, Burma
- Lahe, Lääne-Viru County, village in Haljala Parish, Lääne-Viru County, Estonia
- Lahe, Põlva County, village in Põlva Parish, Põlva County, Estonia
- Lahe, Tartu County, village in Peipsiääre Parish, Tartu County, Estonia
