= Igavere =

Igavere may refer to several places in Estonia:

- Igavere, Harju County, village in Raasiku Parish, Harju County
- Igavere, Tartu County, village in Tartu Parish, Tartu County
