= August Wilhelm Hupel =

Baltic German linguist

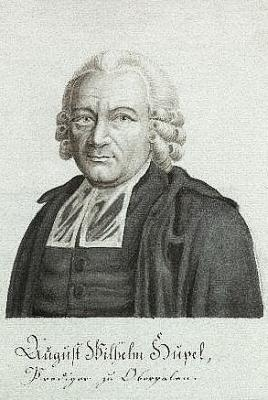
- Born: 25 February 1737; Buttelstedt, present-day Germany
- Died: 7 February 1819 (aged 82); Paide, present-day Estonia
- Scientific career
- Fields: Linguistics

August Wilhelm Hupel (25 February [O.S. 14 February] 1737 in Buttelstedt near Weimar – 7 February [O.S. 26 January] 1819 in Paide) was a Baltic German publicist, baltophile, estophile and linguist.

In 1766–1767, he translated for Lühhike öppetus, the first Estonian language periodical publication, edited by Peter Ernst Wilde. In 1771, he published a medical textbook, Arsti ramat nende juhhatamisseks kes tahtvad többed ärra-arvada ning parrandada (Estonian for Manual of medical diagnostics and healthcare, literally Doctor's book to instruct those who want to guess and repair ailments).

In 1780, Hupel completed a treatise on Estonian grammar, Ehstnische Sprachlehre für beide Hauptdialekte, den revalschen und den dörptschen, nebst einem vollständigen Wörterbuch. First printing of the included dictionary contained around 17,000 words and description of their morphology. The second printing, printed in 1820, had grown to around 20,000 words.

Hupel was a materialist but argued for the existence of an immortal soul. He argued that the soul is composed of "subtle" ether-like type of matter.

== Selected publications ==
- Anmerkungen und Zweifel über die gewöhnlichen Lehrsätze vom Wesen der menschlichen und thierischen Seele (1774)
