= Manual of Medical Diagnostics and Healthcare =

1771 medical manual by Peter Ernst Wilde

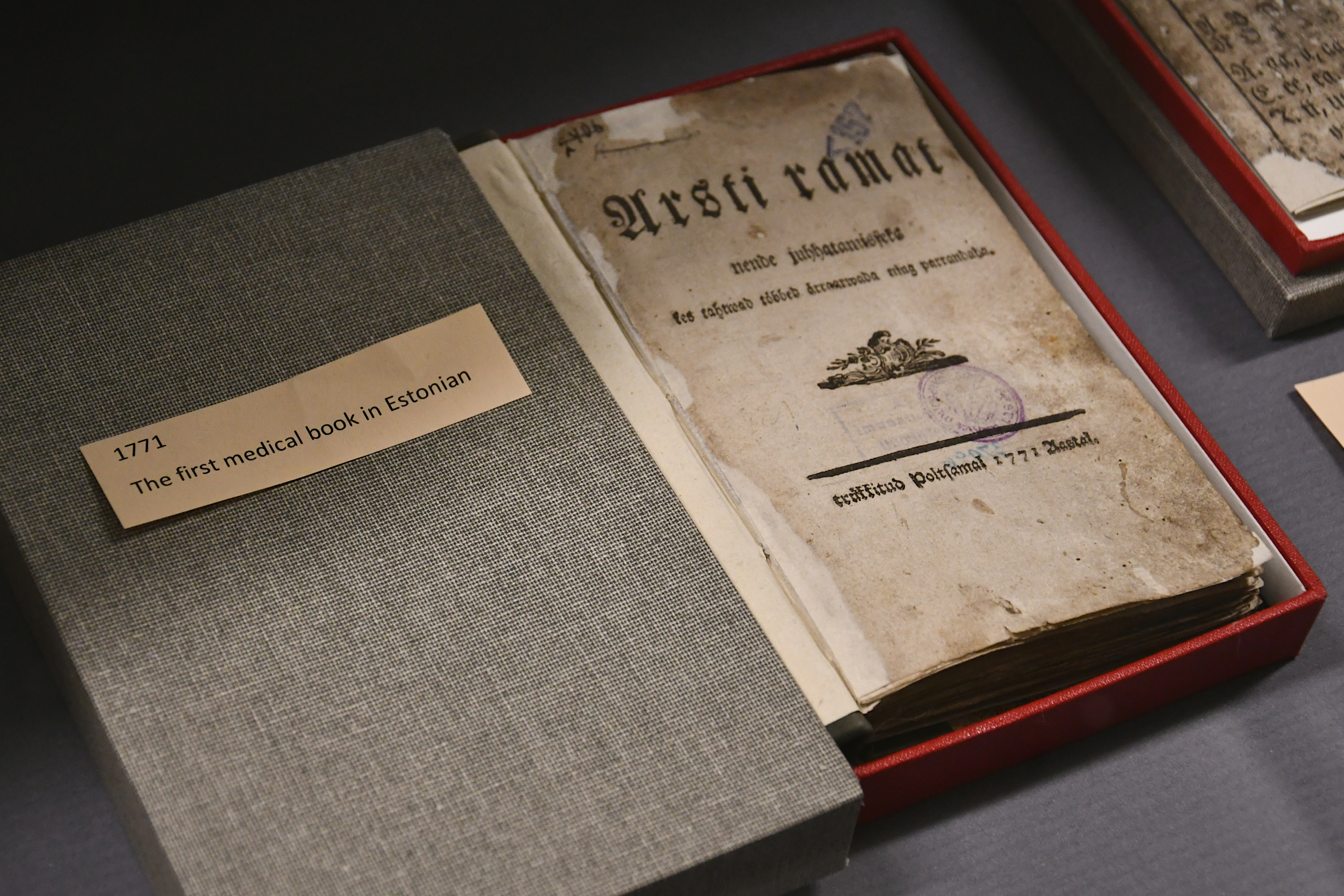
Book in the Estonian Literary Museum

Arsti ramat nende juhhatamisseks kes tahtwad többed ärraarwada ning parrandada (Estonian for Manual of medical diagnostics and healthcare, literally Doctor's book to instruct those who want to guess and repair ailments) was the first medical manual written in Estonian and is also regarded as the beginning of Estonian popular-scientific literature. It was compiled by Peter Ernst Wilde, translated by August Wilhelm Hupel and printed in 1771. It can be viewed as a continuation or a collection of their earlier work, the Lühhike öppetus.
