= Agenda Parva =

1622 book; oldest source of South Estonian language

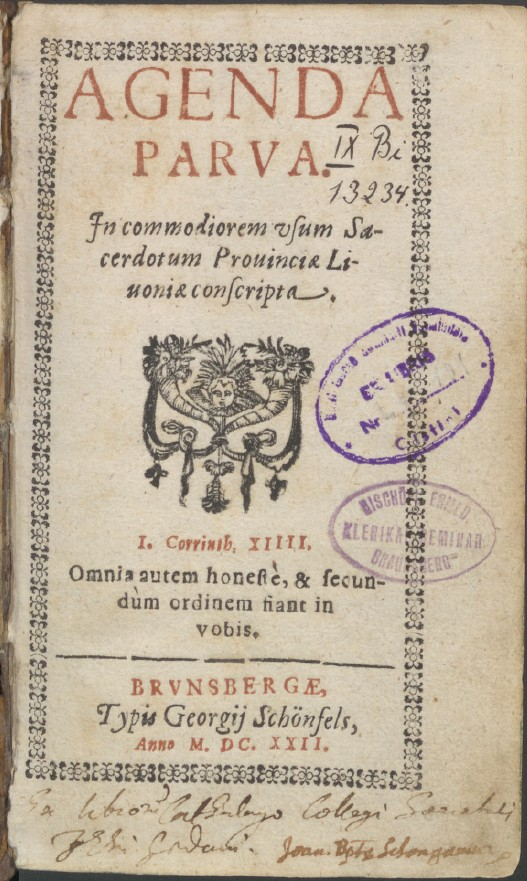
Title page of "Agenda Parva"

Agenda Parva is a mostly Latin-language religious book, which was published in 1622 in Braunsberg (nowadays Braniewo). The book was meant to be used by clergymen of Livonia. Besides Latin-language text, the book consists of Latvian, Estonian (South Estonian), Polish, and German text. The book is considered the oldest source of South Estonian.

== See also ==
- Timeline of early Estonian publications
