= Rita Raave =

Estonian actress

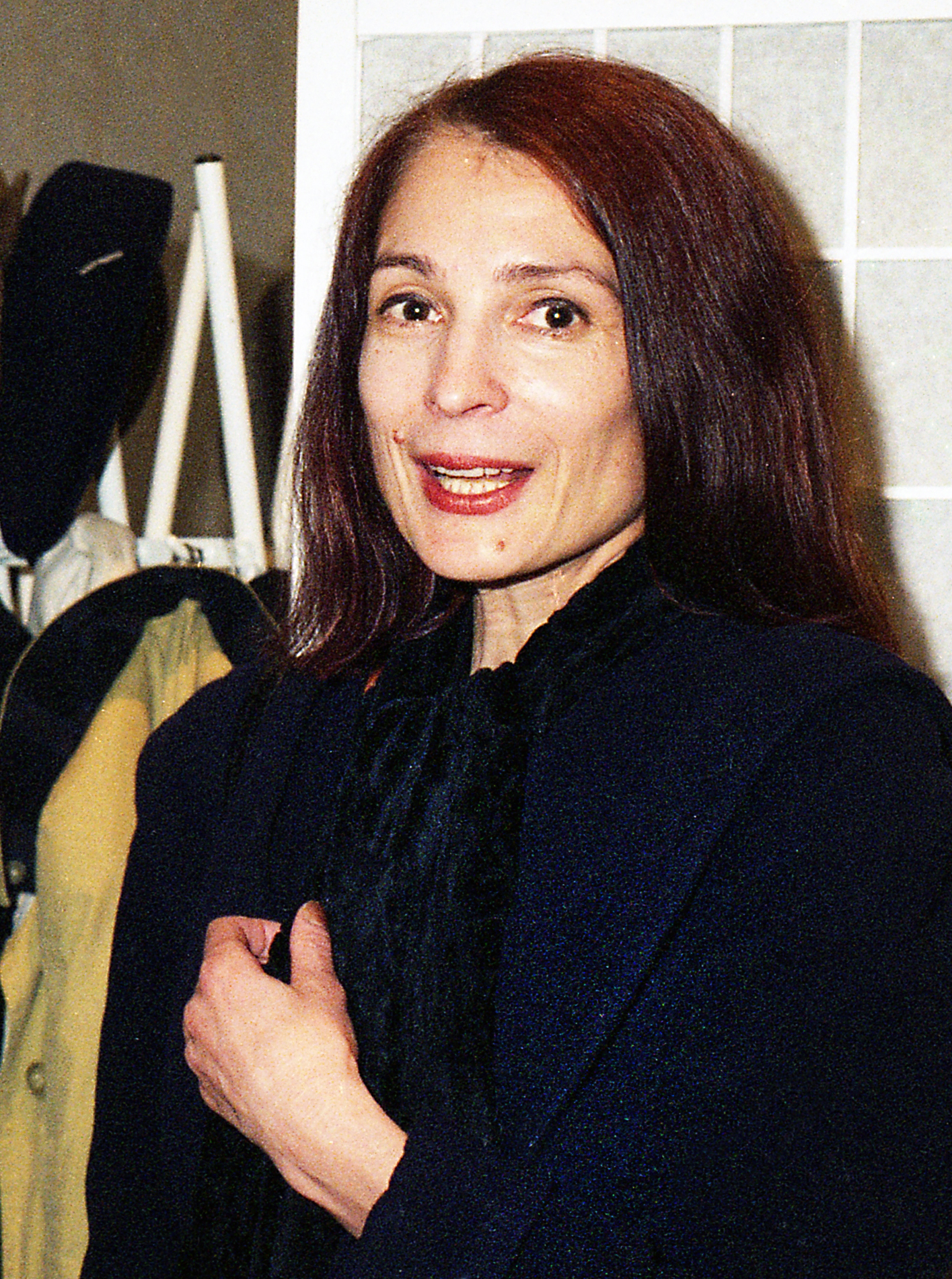
- Raave in 1994
- Born: 6 April 1951 (age 75); Mõisaküla, then part of Estonian SSR, Soviet Union
- Other names: Riita Raave; Rita Kaldoja
- Occupation: Actress
- Years active: 1974-present
- Spouse: Hans Kaldoja (m. 1976; div. 2004) Enn Põldroos (m. 2004; died 2025)
- Children: 1
- Parent: Kalev Raave
- Relatives: Raivo J. Raave (brother), Riho Raave (brother)

Rita Raave (born 6 April 1951) is an Estonian stage, television and film actress, and painter.

== Early life and education ==
Rita Raave was born in Mõisaküla, Viljandi County in 1951 to journalist, cartoonist, Lutheran pastor, and politician Kalev Raave and Lydia Raave (née Majas). She has three siblings: Raivo J. Raave, Riho Raave, and Anneli Raave-Sepp.

Raave pursued a career in acting and is a 1974 graduate of the Tallinn State Conservatory (now, the Estonian Academy of Music and Theatre). Among her graduating classmate were Maria Klenskaja, Elle Kull, Jüri Aarma, Kaie Mihkelson and Jaan Rõõmussaar.

== Stage career ==
Following her graduation from the Tallinn State Conservatory, she became employed as an actress at the Estonian Drama Theatre in Tallinn in 1974, where she would remain until 1998, when she became engaged at the Vannalinnastuudio in Tallinn. Raave would remain at the Vanalinnastuudio until the theatre's closing in 2004; becoming a freelance actress afterward. She has since performed onstage at the Old Baskin's Theatre, among others.

Raave has had a prolific career as a stage actress. Some of her more notable stage roles include those in works by such authors and playwrights as: Shakespeare, Jaan Kross, Jaan Kruusvall, Samuel Beckett, Eugène Ionesco, and Leo Tolstoy.

== Film and television ==
Raave's first substantial feature film role was as a starring role as Ragne Rass in the Olav Neuland directed 1982 Tallinnfilm romantic drama Corrida. The film was based on the 1979 Teet Kallas penned novel of the same name. This was followed the next year by the role of Maret in the Kaljo Kiisk directed Nipernaadi; the film adaptation of the 1928 August Gailit novel Toomas Nipernaadi about a roguish vagabond who breezes through the Estonian countryside inspiring locals to turn their own dreams into reality.

In 1990, she would appear in two films: a small role in the Peeter Simm directed historical drama Inimene, keda polnud, and in the Rauni Mollberg directed Finnish drama Ystävät, toverit. She would end the decade with a role in the 1999 Peeter Urbla directed dramatic film short Kõrbekuu, for Allfilm.

Raave would appear in a number of films throughout the 2000s and 2010s, most notably among them; the 2007 road movie comedy 186 Kilometers; as a brothel administrator in the 2007 Kadri Kõusaar directed drama Magnus; as Ruth in the 2011 Mart Kivastik directed drama Üks mu sõber; and as a judge in the 2013 Kadri Kõusaar directed drama Kohtumõistja. She has also appeared in a number of short films; notably, the Anna Hints directed drama Vaba maa, opposite actors Eili Sild and Raivo Trass. In 2013, she appeared in the role of Susanna's mother in the Veiko Õunpuu directed drama Free Range/Ballaad maailma heakskiitmisest. In 2023, she appeared in the role of Ruth in the Mart Kivastik penned and directed comedy Taevatrepp.

Aside from film, Rita Raave has also appeared on Estonian television. Most notably, in a 1991 television play production of Ernest Hemingway's The End of Something based on Hemingway's 1925 first collection of short stories In Our Time. Between 1993 and 1995, she appeared on the TV3 television drama series Salmonid.

== Painting ==
In addition to acting, Rita Raave has also held several exhibitions of her paintings. In December 2005, she held an exhibition at Tallinn's Gallery-G. She names Renaissance masters such as Giotto, Botticelli, Titian, and da Vinci as inspirations.

== Personal life ==
Riita Raave was married to actor Hans Kaldoja in 1976. The couple had a son, Indrek, before divorcing. In 2004, Raave married writer and artist Enn Põldroos. They resided in Soe in Viljandi County, and operated a small, private art museum in Viljandi until Põldroos's death in 2025.
