= Kuke, Pärnu County =

Village in Estonia

Coordinates: 58°39′46″N 23°31′54″E

Kuke
- Village
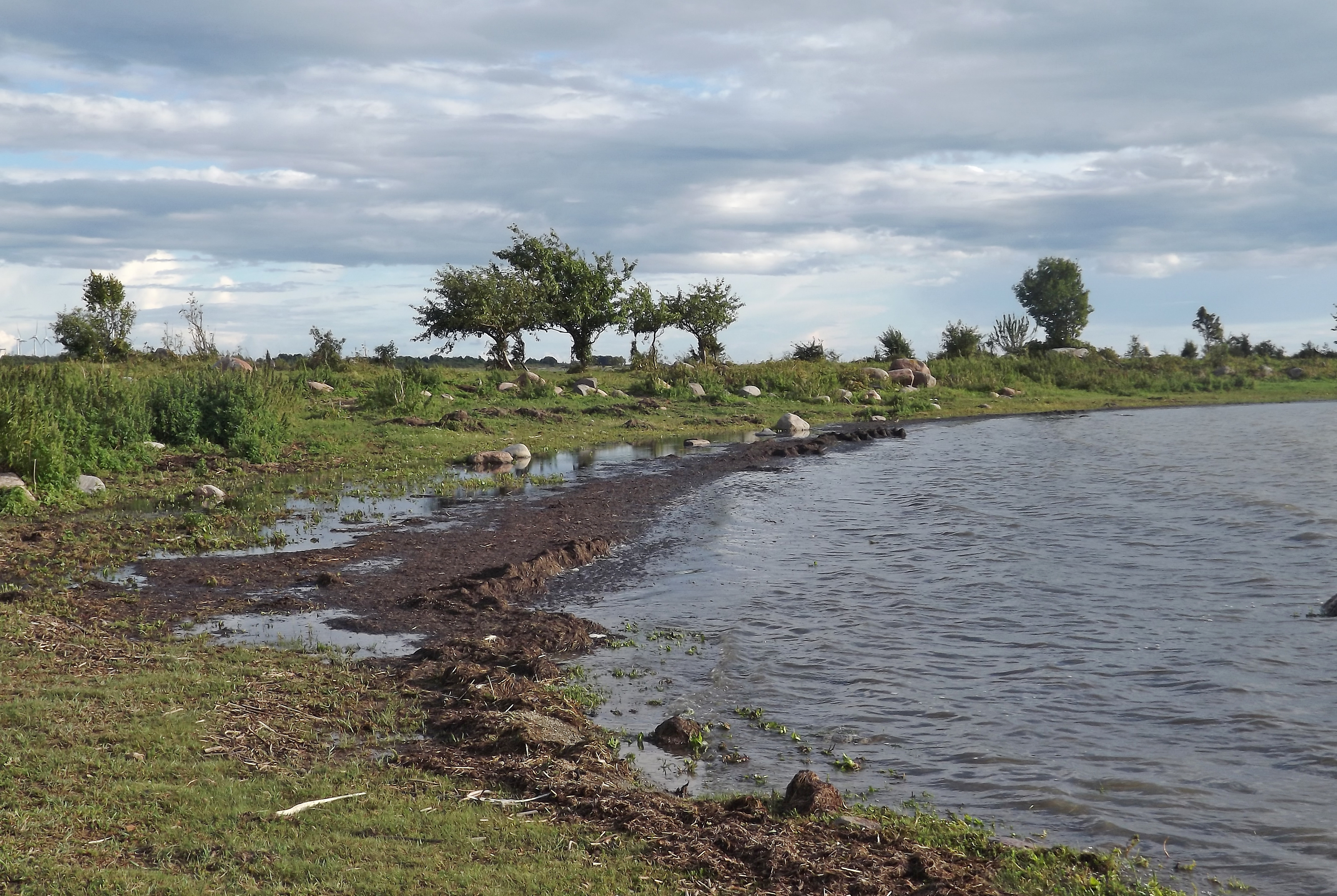
- Kukerand beach
- Interactive map of Kuke
- Country: Estonia
- County: Pärnu County
- Parish: Lääneranna Parish
- Time zone: UTC+2 (EET)
  - Summer (DST): UTC+3 (EEST)

Kuke (before 1997 Kukeranna) is a village in Lääneranna Parish, Pärnu County, in western Estonia.

Some parts of Estonian film "Viimne reliikvia" were filmed there.
