= Enn Põldroos =

Estonian painter and writer (1933–2025)

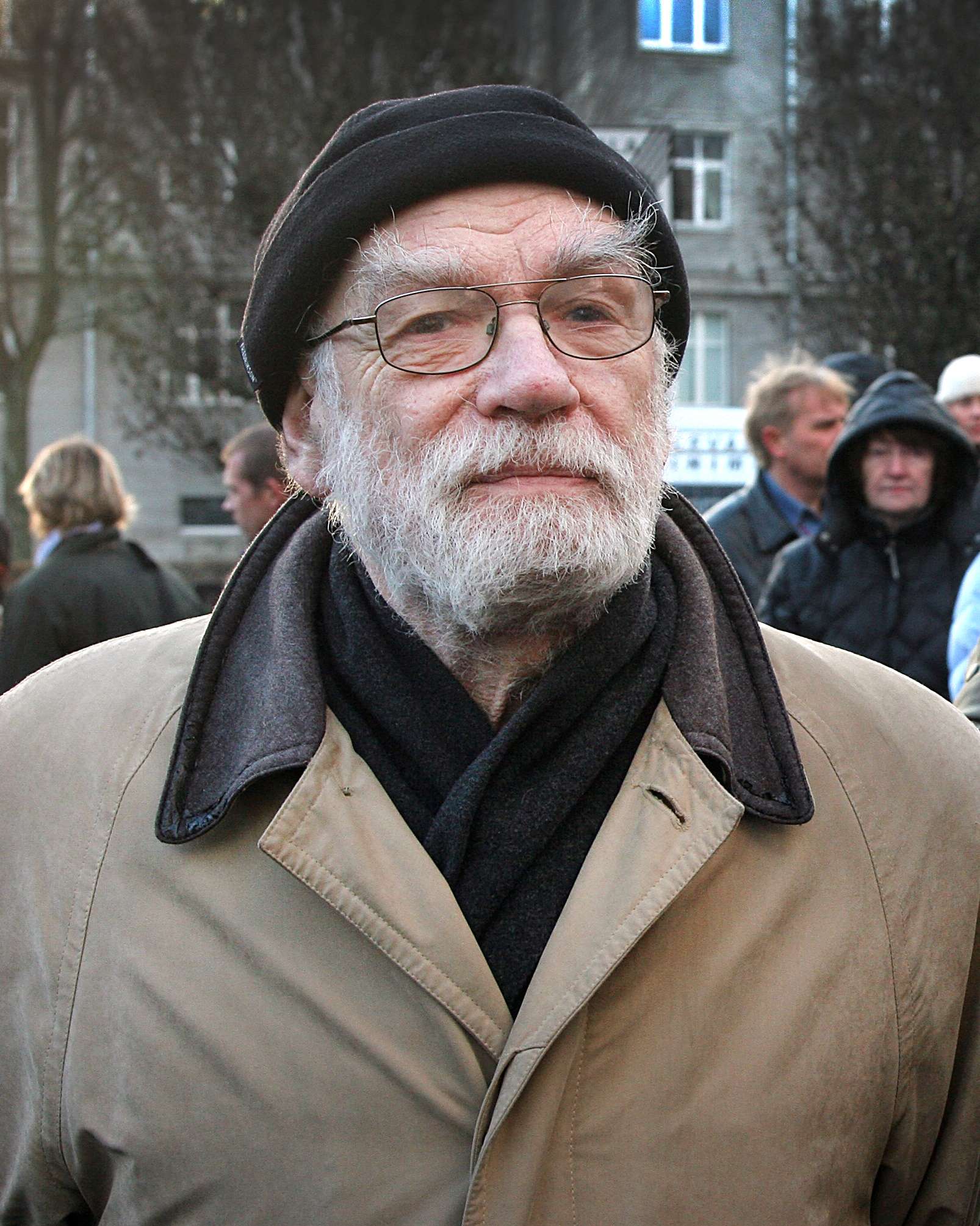
- Põldroos in 2006
- Born: May 21, 1933; Tallinn, Estonia
- Died: September 5, 2025 (aged 92); Tallinn, Estonia
- Citizenship: Estonian
- Education: Estonian State Art Institute (ERKI; now Estonian Academy of Arts)
- Known for: Painting; monumental art; writing
- Notable work: Raadiolill (1978); Eestimaa (1983); Inimeste elu (1985); Varju ja valguse piiril (1993)
- Spouse(s): Helgi Erilaid (m. 1966; div. 1973) Rita Raave (m. 2004–2025)
- Children: Juhan Põldroos, Riina Põldroos
- Awards: State Cultural Award (lifetime achievement, 2014) Order of the National Coat of Arms, 4th Class (2002); Order of the National Coat of Arms, 3rd Class (2006) Konrad Mägi Prize (2013)

Enn Põldroos (21 May 1933 – 5 September 2025) was an Estonian painter, monumental artist and writer. He led the Estonian Artists' Association (Eesti Kunstnike Liit) as chairman and president in 1985–1989 and 1995–1998, and served as a member of the Supreme Council of Estonia during the transition period (1988–1991), including the vote to restore Estonia's independence on 20 August 1991.

His late-career survey exhibition, Enn Põldroos. Kinnismõtete muuseum (“Museum of Obsessions”), was presented in Kumu Art Museum's main hall (6 December 2024 – 13 April 2025).

== Early life and education ==
Põldroos was born in Tallinn on 21 May 1933. His father was actor and director Priit Põldroos. He graduated from Tallinn's 2nd Secondary School in 1952 and studied painting at the Estonian State Art Institute (ERKI) from 1952 to 1958. He joined the Estonian Artists' Association in 1959 and was later named an honorary member (2003).

== Career ==
Põldroos worked as an art educator at the Tallinn Pedagogical Institute (1961–1966) and later taught at ERKI / the Estonian Academy of Arts (including 1973–1985 and 1994–1995). Alongside his easel painting, he produced large-scale monumental works for public interiors.

=== Painting and themes ===
Kumu's retrospective described him as an “adventurous” artist whose manner and style shifted repeatedly, spanning from the strict socialist realism expected in art education to surrealism, while returning throughout his career to recurring motifs and visual “anchors”.

A 2024 Eesti Rahvusringhääling (ERR) feature on the exhibition highlighted the breadth of his output across roughly seven decades and noted that in his later years he increasingly worked in digital media rather than painting on canvas.

=== Monumental works ===
Sources from the Estonian Artists’ Association and ERR list among his best-known monumental commissions:

- Raadiolill (1978, Estonian Radio building)
- Eestimaa (1983, Estonian Embassy in Moscow)
- Inimeste elu (1985, Tallinn Linnahall)
- Varju ja valguse piiril (1993, National Library of Estonia).

== Writing ==
Although best known as a visual artist, Põldroos also published prose and memoir writing, becoming particularly visible as a writer in the 2000s. In 2002 his novel Joonik kivi received third prize in Estonia's novel competition.

== Political activity ==
Põldroos took part in Estonia's late-Soviet and independence-era politics and was a member of the Supreme Council (1988–1991). Both ERR and the Estonian Artists’ Association note that he voted in favour of restoring Estonia's independence on 20 August 1991.

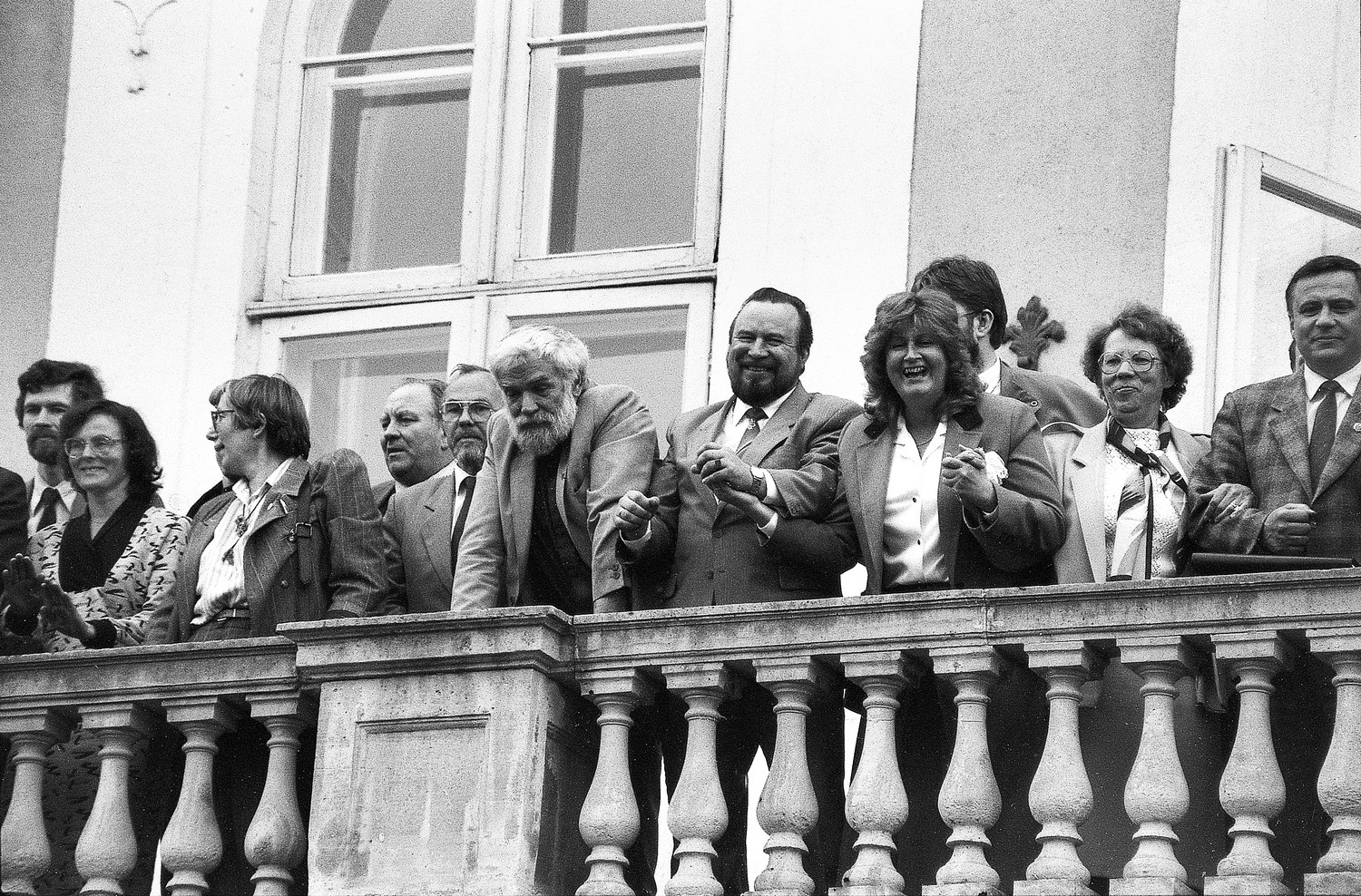
Members of the Supreme Council after the Intermovement attack on Toompea Castle (15 May 1990); Põldroos is in the centre.

== Honours and awards ==
Põldroos received major state and professional recognition, including:

- Order of the National Coat of Arms – 4th Class (2002) and 3rd Class (2006).
- State Cultural Award (lifetime achievement), awarded by the Government of Estonia on the proposal of the state culture awards commission (2014).
- Konrad Mägi Prize (2013).

Biographical art databases additionally record earlier Soviet-era and Baltic-region prizes (including Vilnius Painting Triennial awards, Kristjan Raud Art Award, and a USSR State Prize), though coverage varies by source.

== Personal life ==
Enn Põldroos was married to radio journalist Helgi Erilaid from 1966 until their divorce in 1973. In 1975, he had a son, economist Juhan Põldroos, and the following year, a daughter, fashion designer Riina Põldroos.

In 2004, he married actress Rita Raave. They resided in Soe in Viljandi County, and operated a small, private art museum in Viljandi until Põldroos's death in on 5 September 2025.
