= Tallinna narrid ja narrikesed =

1892 literary work by Eduard Bornhöhe

Tallinna narrid ja narrikesed (Estonian for Big Fools and Little Fools of Tallinn) is a satirical 1892 series by Eduard Bornhöhe depicting cranks in their daily activities. Particularly famous is the first part, Kuulsuse narrid (Fools of Fame), whose protagonists Jaan Tatikas and Saalomon Vesipruul have become well-known stereotypes in Estonian culture.

== Composition ==
The series consists of two parts, Kuulsuse narrid (Estonian for Fools of Fame) and Raha narrid (Fools of Money). The first part is widely known; the second part was suppressed as inconvenient during Soviet occupation and is consequently little known.

== Characters ==
=== Saalomon Vesipruul ===
Saalomon Vesipruul, one of the protagonists of the first part, is a talentless aspiring writer.

=== Jaan Tatikas ===
Jaan Tatikas, one of the protagonists of the first part, is an incompetent and uneducated aspiring inventor.

One of the most famous failed inventions of Tatikas was a man-powered device supposedly capable of moving over land and water and flying in air (and interplanetary space). Tatikas named the device Kallewipoegk, a horribly misspelt but recognisable reference to Kalevipoeg.

The first part ends with Jaan Tatikas accidentally blowing up his house while trying to invent a machine to convert dolomite into pork, but surviving due to being away during the explosion.

== Adaptations ==
Kuulsuse narrid was adapted for TV in 1982 by Ago-Endrik Kerge. A musical humoratory on the motifs, heavily influenced by modern culture, was prepared in 2005 by Jüri-Ruut Kangur and Tõnno Piigli.
