= Otok, West Pomeranian Voivodeship =

Otok
- Village
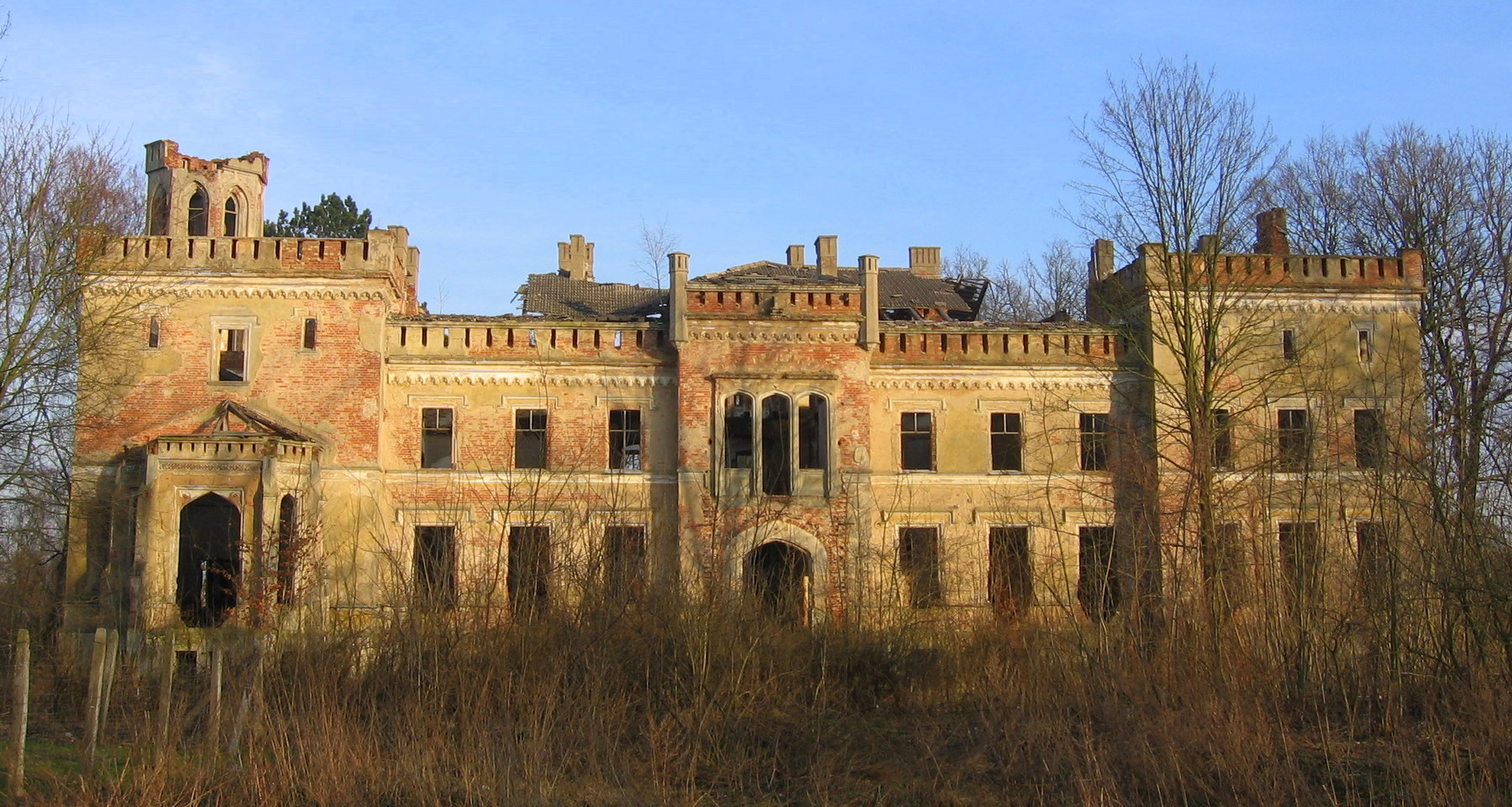
- Ruins of the former palace in Otok

- Location within Poland
- Coordinates: 53°58′48″N 15°12′38″E
- Country: Poland
- Voivodeship: West Pomeranian
- County: Gryfice
- Gmina: Gryfice
- Population: 275
- Time zone: UTC+1 (CET)
  - Summer (DST): UTC+2 (CEST)
- Vehicle registration: ZGY

Otok [ˈɔtɔk] (German Woedtke) is a village in the administrative district of Gmina Gryfice, within Gryfice County, West Pomeranian Voivodeship, in north-western Poland. It lies approximately 8 km (5 mi) north of Gryfice and 75 km (47 mi) north-east of the regional capital Szczecin.

The village has a population of 275.

== History ==
The territory became part of the emerging Polish state under its first ruler Mieszko I around 967. Following the fragmentation of Poland, it was part of the Duchy of Pomerania. From the 18th century, it was part of the Kingdom of Prussia and from 1871 to 1945 also Germany.

== Notable residents ==
- Peter Ernst Wilde (1732–1785), physician
