= Viimne reliikvia =

1969 film directed by Grigori Kromanov

Viimne reliikvia (The Last Relic)
- Directed by: Grigori Kromanov
- Written by: Eduard Bornhöhe; Arvo Valton
- Produced by: Tallinnfilm
- Starring: Aleksandr Goloborodko; Ingrīda Andriņa
- Cinematography: Jüri Garšnek
- Edited by: Virve Laev; V. Payev; Lennart Meri
- Music by: Tõnu Naissoo; Uno Naissoo
- Distributed by: Tallinnfilm
- Release dates: 23 March 1970 (Estonia); 4 January 1971 (Soviet Union); 3 October 1971 (Finland); 15 March 2002 (Estonia, re-release)
- Running time: 86 minutes
- Countries: Estonia; Soviet Union
- Language: Estonian

The Last Relic (Estonian: Viimne reliikvia) is a 1969 Estonian historical adventure film. It became one of the most popular films ever made in the country, and some critics have even called it "the only Estonian cult film".

The film is loosely based on Prince Gabriel or The Last Days of Pirita Monastery, a 1893 Estonian historical fiction novel by Eduard Bornhöhe.

The film's content editor was later president of Estonia Lennart Meri.

== Plot ==
In 16th-century Livonia, the story begins with the death of an old knight, Risbiter, who bequeaths a holy relic to his son. This relic draws the interest of the abbess and monks of a nearby convent, who seek to claim it for their monastery. The younger Risbiter, captivated by the beauty of Agnes, the abbess’s niece, claims to have had a vision of Saint Bridget instructing him to donate the relic to the convent after marrying Agnes. While preparing for their betrothal, Risbiter and Agnes encounter Gabriel, a "free man" who immediately falls in love with Agnes. However, their meeting is interrupted when rebels attack Risbiter's estate, disrupting the engagement ceremony. Gabriel saves Agnes and escorts her to Tallinn, deepening their bond during the journey.

As the abbess learns of Agnes’s disappearance, she sends monks to track her movements, using carrier pigeons to communicate. Meanwhile, Gabriel and Agnes grow closer, but their happiness is cut short when they are attacked by bandits led by Ivo Schenkenberg. Ivo captures Agnes and severely wounds Gabriel, though Agnes manages to escape and return to her aunt in the convent. Gabriel, surviving the attack with the help of his friend Siim, searches for Agnes and finds assistance from Ursula, a young nun who helps him evade the convent’s pursuers. Gabriel reaches the monastery but is lured into a deadly trap by Brother Johannes, the abbess's scheming advisor. Ursula once again aids Gabriel, freeing him and sending word to Siim to meet him in Tallinn.

Brother Johannes continues his manipulations, orchestrating events that lead to Ivo murdering Risbiter and stealing the relic for the convent. However, Ivo is also ensnared by the abbess and placed in a stone trap. The abbess, desperate to maintain control, tortures Agnes to force her into taking monastic vows. Meanwhile, Gabriel learns of Agnes’s supposed marriage plans and rushes back to the monastery. He arrives in time to kill Ivo, interrupt the forced ceremony, and rescue Agnes. With Siim and Ursula’s help, Gabriel fends off armed guards and leads a peasant uprising that destroys the monastery. As the rebels set the convent ablaze, Gabriel and Agnes ride to freedom, accompanied by Siim and Ursula, leaving the ruins of the abbess’s power behind them.

== Production ==
The movie is set during the Livonian War (1558-1583). A central plot device is the Pirita monastery, a real monastery dedicated to St. Brigitta. Currently, the monastery's original medieval buildings lie in ruins and are kept that way as a museum.

Scenes for the movie were recorded in Tallinn Old Town, passages of the Dominican monastery of Tallinn, Taevaskoja, as well as other places. A monastery set was built in Kukerand, near Virtsu. Several outdoors scenes were taken in Latvia, near the Gauja river. Indoors scenes were, among other places, taken in the fortress of Kuressaare and the Tallinn church of St. Nicholas.

A typical live action movie of the era had a standardised budget of 350,000 roubles. As a special case, the team of Viimne reliikvia managed to haggle themselves a budget of 750,000 roubles — more than double the customary. This lavishness paid off very well, as within the very first year, 772,000 tickets were sold in Estonia only. (Remarkably, Estonia's population at that time was around 1,300,000.) The movie set the absolute box office record for the entire Soviet Union in 1971 by selling 44.9 million tickets. It was distributed by the Soviet film export internationally in more than 60 countries.

== Versions ==
A Russian language version of the film Russian: Последняя реликвия, romanized: Poslyednyaya ryelikvya) was dubbed by the Mosfilm studio. It is 89 minutes in length.

In 2000, the Estonian Film Foundation and Tallinnfilm determined Viimne reliikvia to be an important part of Estonian cultural heritage, and in order to preserve it, undertook a digital remastering. This became the first digitally remastered Estonian movie; others followed.

The digital copy was re-launched on 15 March 2002, and again, became a bestseller. As of 2007, the remastered movie is available on DVD.

== In popular culture ==
The movie became extremely influential, and as such, has been repeatedly parodied. For example, in 1992, Ivar Vigla prepared a brief parody of the film for his Wigla Show on Estonian TV. Vigla created many new jokes based on the film quotes, e.g. "We don't get paid for chitchat" (Estonian: Meil lobisemise eest palka ei maksta) and "What will become of us? — A joint venture." (Estonian: Mis meist saab? — Ühisfirma.) Many of these parody quotes became independently popular, and then, in turn, became lampooned in other venues, such as the Ugala Theatre's production of The Love for Three Oranges. Several parodies of the movie's songs have been circulated in the Internet.

== Cast ==
- Aleksandr Goloborodko as Gabriel (Estonian voice: Mati Klooren)
- Ingrīda Andriņa as Agnes von Mönnikhusen (Estonian voice: Mare Garšnek)
- Elza Radziņa as Abtiss (Estonian voice: Aino Talvi)
- Rolan Bykov as Brother Johannes (Estonian voice: Jüri Järvet)
- Eve Kivi as Ursula
- Uldis Vazdiks as Siim (Estonian voice: Aksel Orav)
- Raivo Trass as Hans von Risbieter
- Peeter Jakobi as Ivo Schenkenberg (Estonian voice: Olev Eskola)
- Karl Kalkun as Rebel Leader
- Valdeko Ratassepp as Johann von Risbieter
- Jüri Uppin as Delvig
- Helmut Vaag as Innkeeper
- Katrin Karisma as Chambermaid
- Ago Saller as Priest in the monastery
- Priit Pärn as Insurgent
- Ants Lauter as Elder
- Hans Kaldoja as Monk
- Ain Jürisson as Monk
- Hugo Laur as Monk
- Kalju Komissarov as Monk
- Feliks Kark as Robber
- Valdo Truve as Robber
- Viivi Dikson as Lute player

Vocals: Estonian: Peeter Tooma (:et), Russian: Georg Ots
