= Eduard Bornhöhe =

Estonian writer

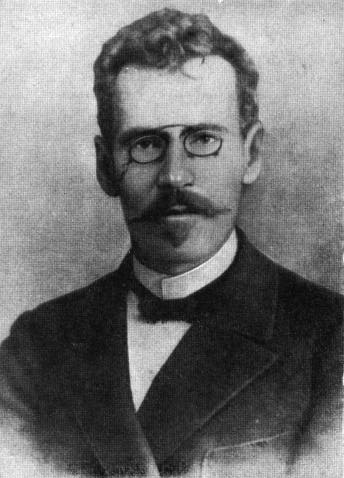
- Born: Eduard Brunberg; 17 February 1862; Kullaaru, Kreis Wierland, Governorate of Estonia, Russian Empire
- Died: 17 November 1923 (aged 61); Tallinn, Estonia

Eduard Brunberg (17 February 1862 [O.S. 5 February 1862] – 17 November 1923), known by the pen name Eduard Bornhöhe, was an Estonian writer.

Bornhöhe is generally considered a pioneer of the genre of the Estonian historical novel, as the majority of his creations consist of romanticism-influenced historical adventure stories.

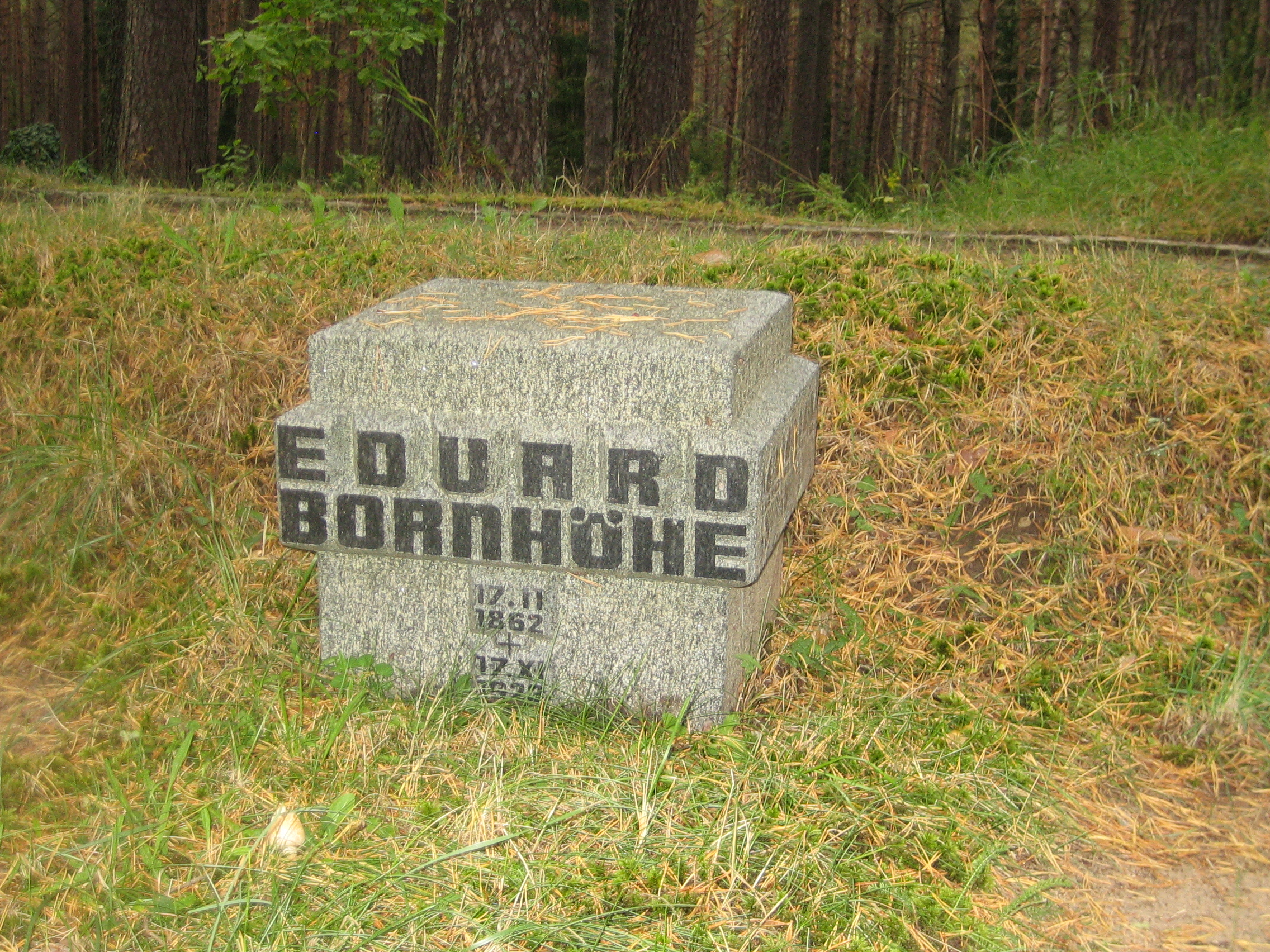

== Bibliography ==
- 1880 Tasuja (Estonian for Avenger)

A historical story, set during the time of the St. George's Night Uprising. Widely considered the best work of Bornhöhe.

- 1890 Villu võitlused (Estonian for Battles of Villu)

Another historical story set during the time of the St. George's Night Uprising. More realistic and less naïve than Tasuja, with more sophisticated characters.

- 1892 Tallinna narrid ja narrikesed (Estonian for Big fools and little fools of Tallinn)

A satirical series of contemporary cranks.

- 1893 Vürst Gabriel ehk Pirita kloostri viimsed päevad (Estonian for Furst Gabriel or The last days of Pirita monastery)

This historical story, best known through the movie adaptation Viimne reliikvia (Estonian for The last relic), is set during a peasant uprising in the era of the Livonian War. Due to Czarist censorship, this remained Bornhöhe's last historical story.

- 1899 Usurändajate radadel (Estonian for On the trail of faith travellers)

A travel diary.

- 1903 Kollid (Estonian for Monsters)

A realist short novel.

== Withdrawal from publication ==
In 1893, the Russian Empire's censor prohibited publication of historical stories. This led to the eventual withdrawal of Bornhöhe from writing. Notably, he didn't publish any books during the last twenty years of his life.

== Soviet views ==
Since Bornhöhe's preferred topic was Estonia's ancient fight for freedom rather than more complex or more polemical subjects, Soviets generally found his writings useful, and presented them as examples of pre-Soviet patriotism. Vürst Gabriel ehk Pirita kloostri viimased päevad was made into a movie, the first part of Tallinna narrid ja narrikesed was repeatedly published and adapted for TV under Soviet occupation, and Bornhöhe's historical novels were constantly in lists of mandatory reading in Soviet Estonian schools.

== Sources ==
- Eduard Bornhöhe. Kirjanik ja inimene, a short monograph (1961) from the series of Eesti kirjamehi by Endel Nirk
