= Furst Gabriel or Last Days of the Pirita Monastery =

1893 novel by Eduard Bornhöhe

Furst Gabriel or Last Days of the Pirita Monastery (Estonian: Vürst Gabriel ehk Pirita kloostri viimsed päevad) is an Estonian historical novelle by Eduard Bornhöhe.

This historical story, first published in 1893, is the last of Eduard Bornhöhe's historical novelles, as in 1893, the Russian Empire's censorship prohibited publication of historical novelles, fearing it might cause too strong patriotic feelings in provincial regions.

The story is set during a Livonian War era peasant uprising. A central plot device is a Catholic nunnery dedicated to St. Brigitta (see Pirita monastery). The monastery's medieval buildings are currently in ruins and considered a museum; however, the organisational structure was restored after end of Soviet occupation.

While other major historical novelles by Eduard Bornhöhe have been included in lists of mandatory reading by Soviet authorities, this book was usually considered too long for that, and thus, it's mostly known through its extremely popular 1969 movie adaptation, Viimne reliikvia (Estonian for The last relic) directed by Grigori Kromanov and adapted by Arvo Valton.
