= Arvo Valton =

Estonian writer (1935–2024)

Arvo Valton in 2015

Arvo Vallikivi (14 December 1935 – 26 July 2024), commonly known under the pen name of Arvo Valton, was an Estonian writer known for a number of books and, among other things, the script for Viimne reliikvia, the highly successful film adaptation of Eduard Bornhöhe's Vürst Gabriel ehk Pirita kloostri viimsed päevad.

In October 1980, Valton was a signatory of the Letter of 40 Intellectuals, a public letter in which forty prominent Estonian intellectuals defended the Estonian language and protested the Russification policies of the Kremlin in Estonia. The signatories also expressed their unease against Republic-level government in harshly dealing with youth protests in Tallinn that were sparked a week earlier due to the banning of a public performance of the punk rock band Propeller.

In 1992, Arvo Valton was elected member of parliament (Riigikogu). Valton died on 26 July 2024, at the age of 88.

== Bibliography ==
- Veider soov (1963)
- Rataste vahel (1965)
- Kaheksa jaapanlannat (1968)
- Luikede soo. Karussel (1968)
- Sõnumitooja (1972)
- Õukondlik mäng (1972)
- Pööriöö külaskäik (1974)
- Läbi unemaastike (1975)
- Tee lõpmatuse teise otsa (1978)
- Mustamäe armastus (1978)
- Ajaprintsess (1981)
- Võõras linnas (1981)
- Zugluft (1983)
- Arvid Silberi maailmareis (Arvid Silber's Trip Round the World, 1984)
- Üksildased ajas (1983 and 1985)
- Masendus ja lootus (1989)
- Õndsusse kulgev päev (1992)
- Kogutud teosed (Collected works, 1998)
