= Wanradt–Koell Catechism =

1535 book; oldest printed source of Estonian

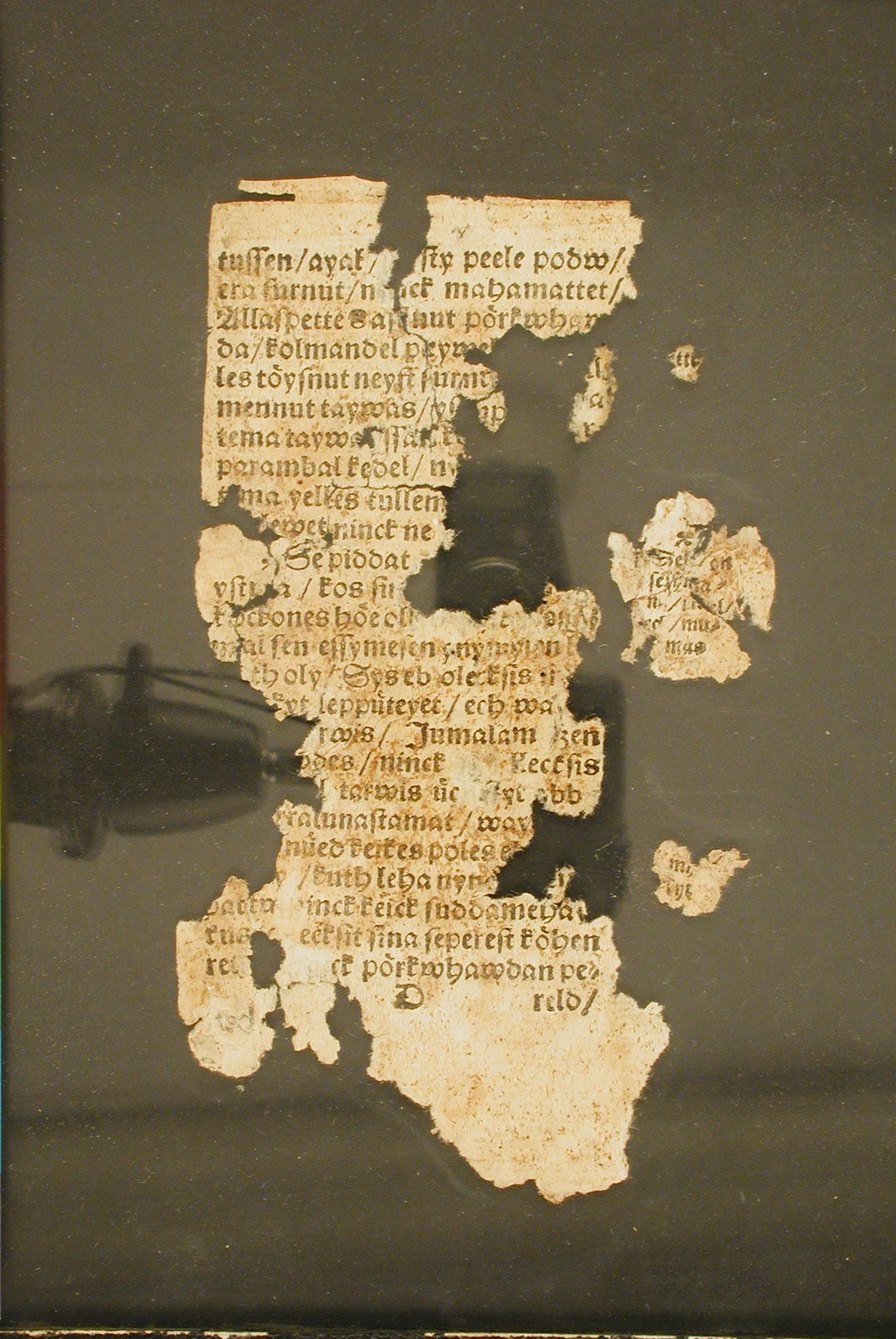
Fragment of the book

The Wanradt–Koell Catechism (Estonian: Wanradti ja Koelli katekismus) is a partly preserved book that is considered the oldest printed source of Estonian. The oldest known examples of handwritten Estonian appear in 13th-century chronicles. The book was compiled by the clergymen Simon Wanradt and Johann Koell. The book was published in 1535 in Wittenberg.

Fragments from the book were discovered in 1929 by the historian Hellmuth Weiss.

== See also ==
- Timeline of early Estonian publications
