= Tasuja =

Tasuja is an Estonian given name and surname. Notable people with the name include:

- Tasuja Oja (1888–1946), Estonian politician
- Jaanus Tasuja (1896–1941), Estonian politician

== See also ==
- EML Tasuja, ship of the Estonian Navy 2006–2016
