= Igavere, Harju County =

Village in Estonia

Coordinates: 59°19′57″N 25°04′44″E

Igavere
- Village
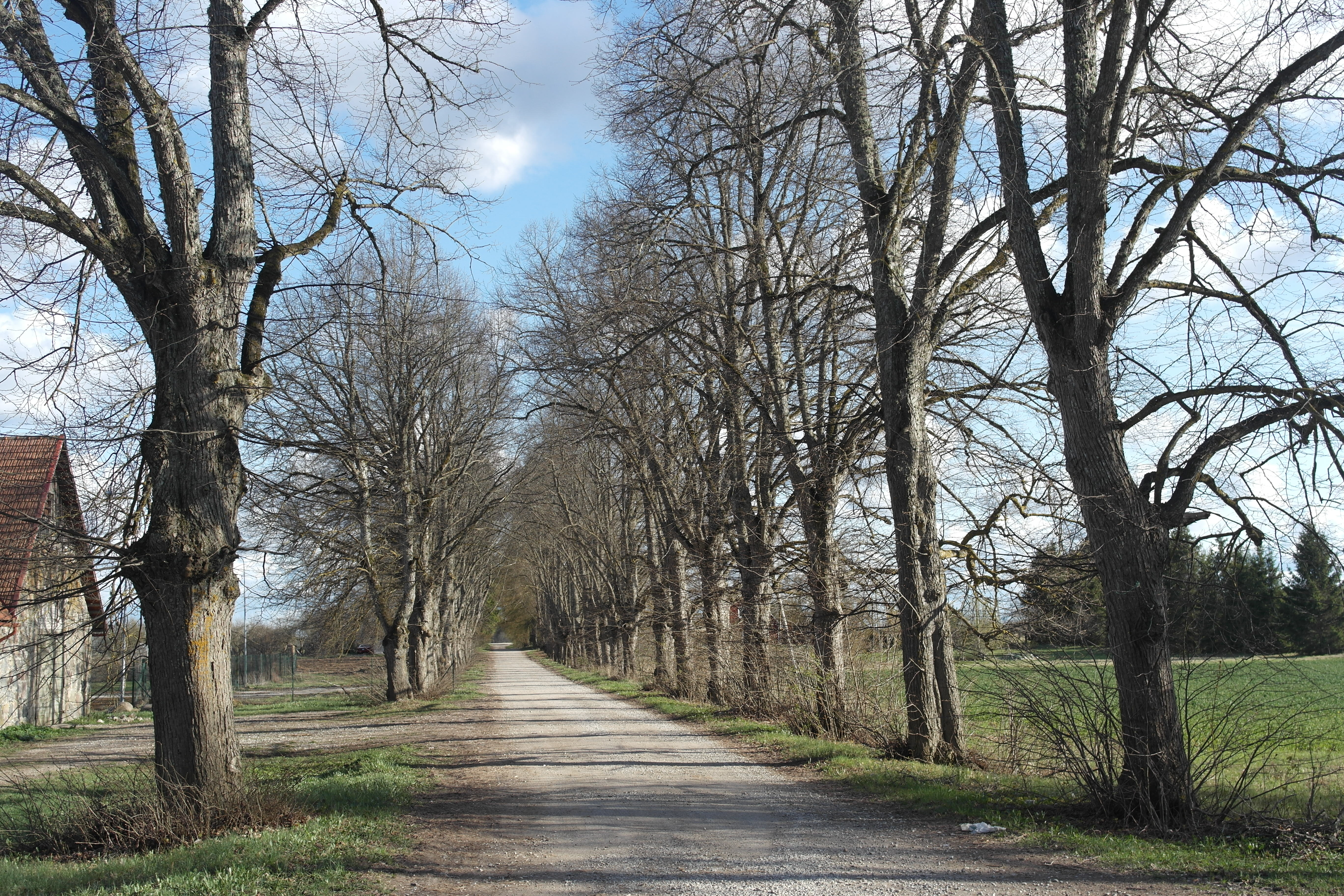
- Interactive map of Igavere
- Country: Estonia
- County: Harju County
- Parish: Raasiku Parish
- Time zone: UTC+2 (EET)
  - Summer (DST): UTC+3 (EEST)

Igavere is a village in Raasiku Parish, Harju County in northern Estonia.

Actor Hans Kaldoja (1942–2017) was born in Igavere.
