= Endel Nirk =

Estonian literary scientist, critic, and writer (1925–2018)

Endel Nirk (15 December 1925 in Koorküla Parish – 15 April 2018) was an Estonian literary scientist, critic and writer.

In 1949, he graduated from Tartu State University in Estonian philology. After graduating he worked at the editorial board of the newspaper Sirp ja Vasar. Since 1953 he worked at Estonian SSR Academy of Sciences' Language and Literature Institute.

Since 1955 he was a member of Estonian Writers' Union.

Awards:

- 2000: Order of the White Star, IV class.
- 2006: Order of the State Walk of the Year.

== Works ==
- "Eduard Bornhöhe", Eesti Riiklik Kirjastus 1961
- "Friedrich Reinhold Kreutzwald", Eesti Riiklik Kirjastus 1961
- "Teemad variatsioonidega", Eesti Riiklik Kirjastus 1964
- "Kreutzwald ja eesti rahvusliku kirjanduse algus", Eesti Raamat 1968
- "Eesti kirjanduse biograafiline leksikon" (with Endel Sõgel), Eesti Raamat 1975
- "Kaanekukk", Kunst 1977
- "Mosaiikvõlv", Eesti Raamat 1978
- "Eesti kirjandus", Perioodika 1983
- "Avardumine", Eesti Raamat 1985
- "Tabelinus", Perioodika 1990
- "Teeline ja tähed. Eurooplase Karl Ristikivi elu", Eesti Raamat 1991
