= Lahe, Lääne-Viru County =

Village in Estonia

Coordinates: 59°36′35″N 25°59′59″E

Lahe
- Village
- Interactive map of Lahe
- Country: Estonia
- County: Lääne-Viru County
- Parish: Haljala Parish
- Time zone: UTC+2 (EET)
  - Summer (DST): UTC+3 (EEST)

Lahe is a village in Haljala Parish, Lääne-Viru County, in northeastern Estonia.

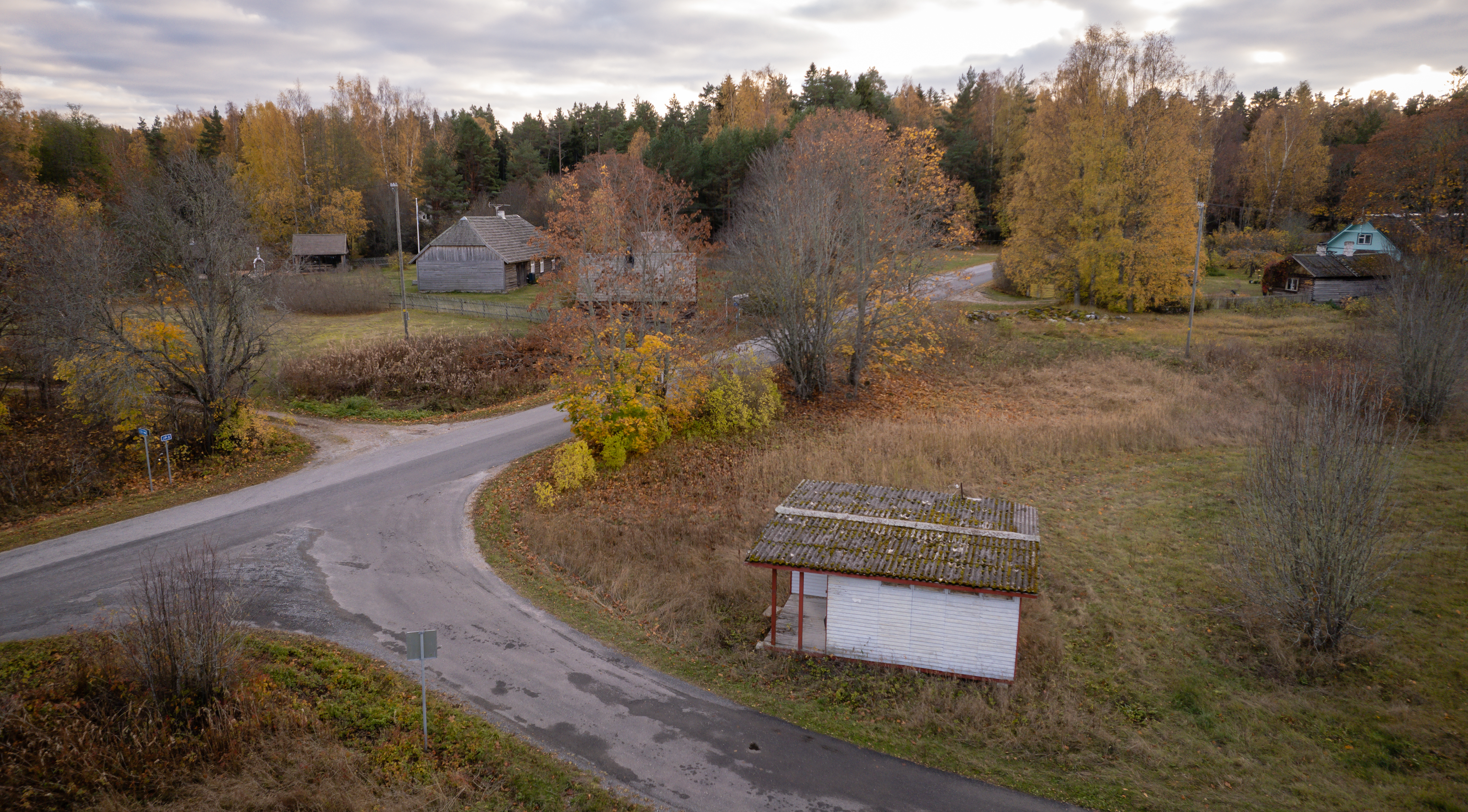

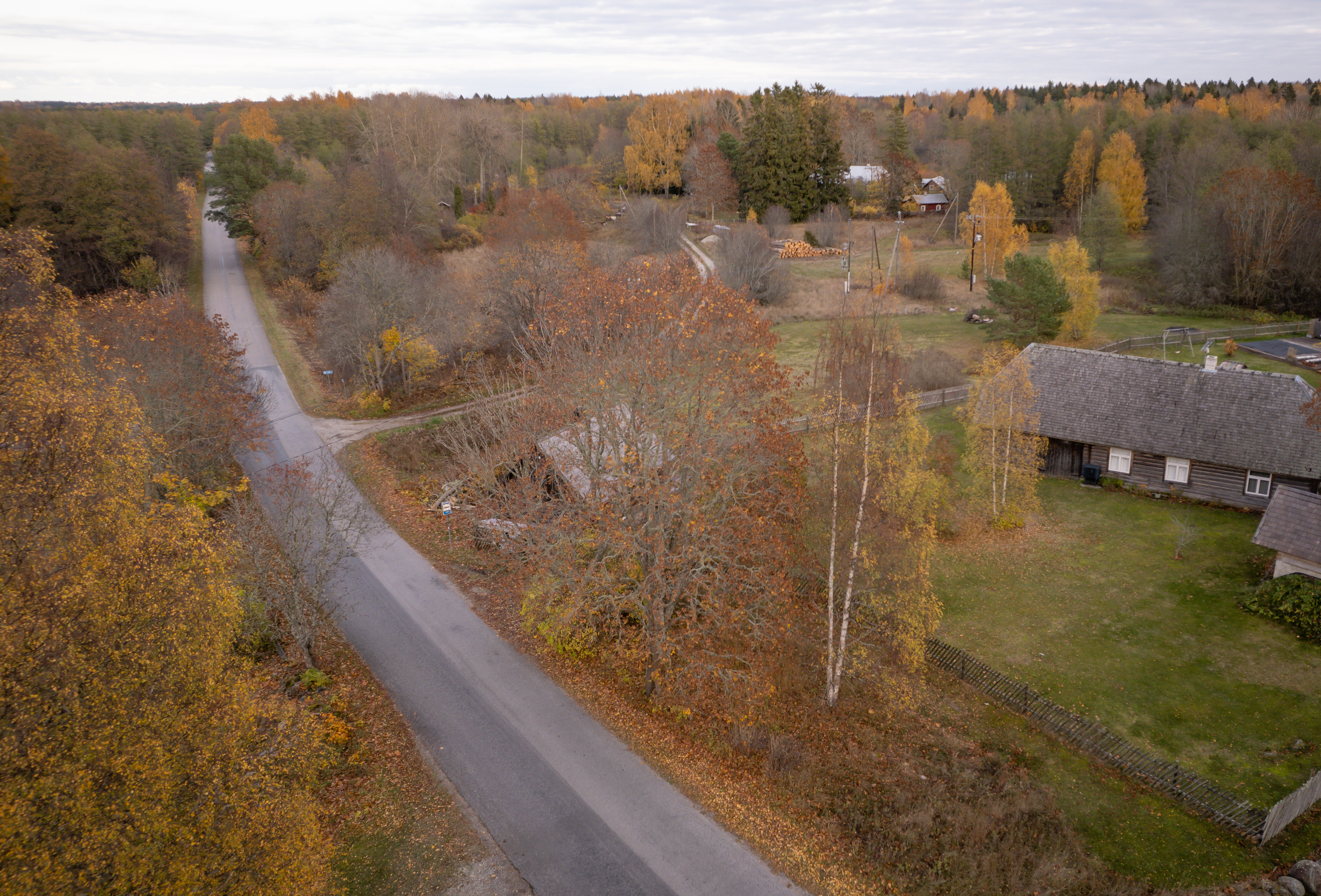

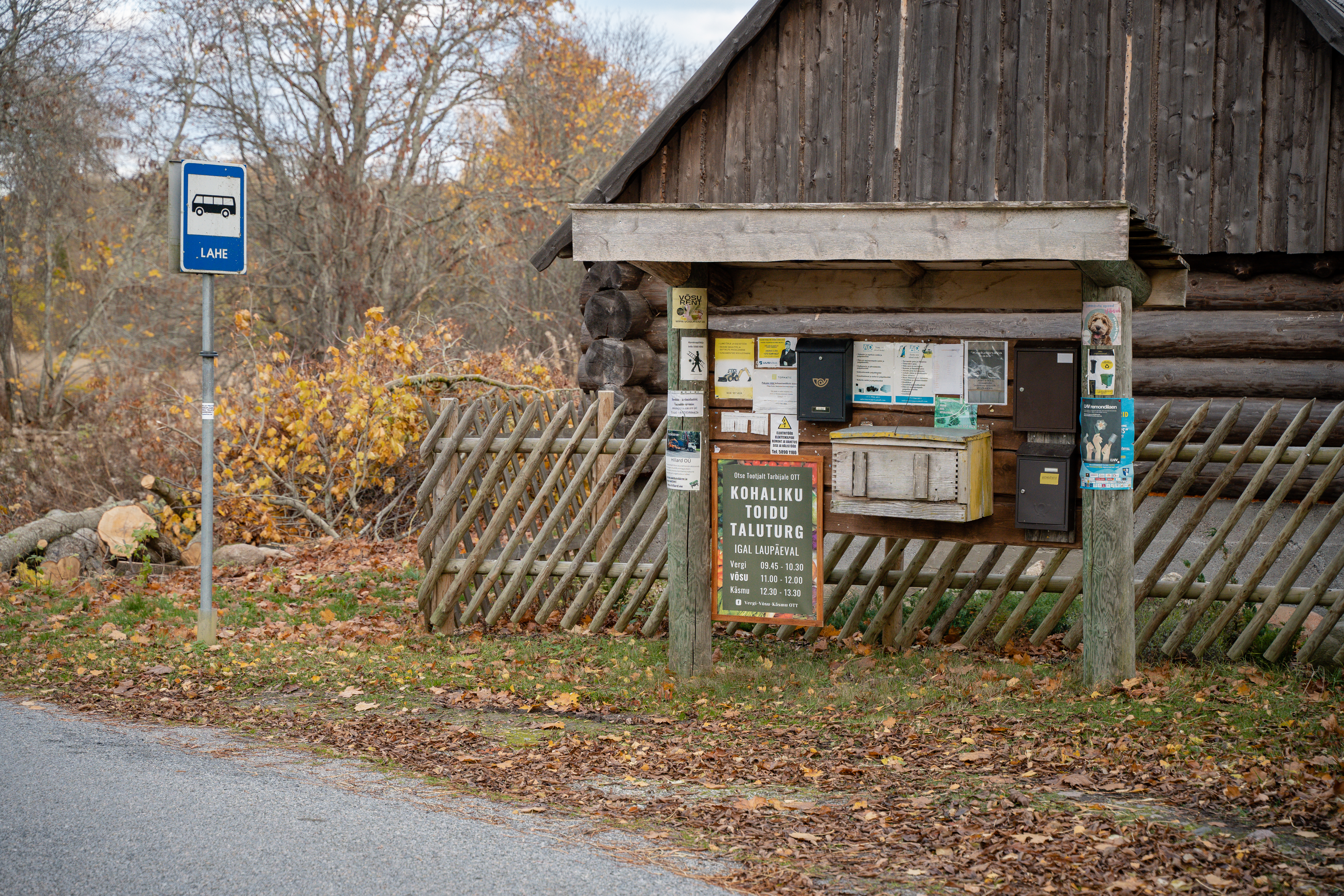
