= Tarto maa rahva Näddali-Leht =

Estonian newspaper

- Language: Estonian

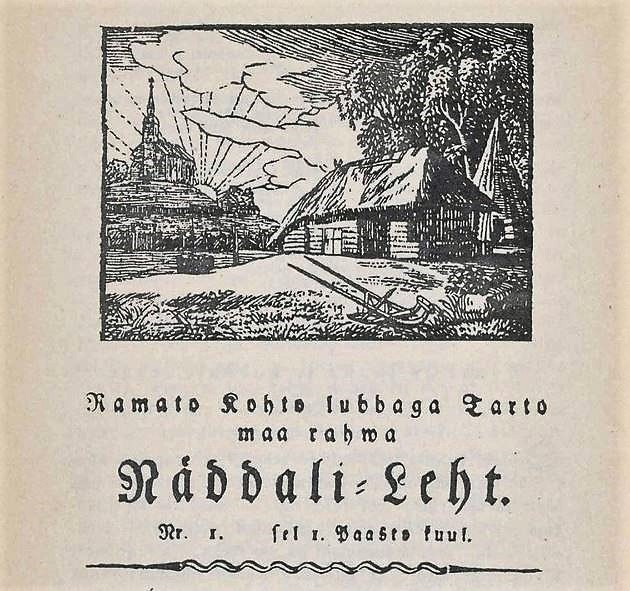
Tarto-ma rahwa Näddali-Leht newspaper cover, 1806

Tarto maa rahva Näddali-Leht was a newspaper published in Estonia in 1806.

The first periodical publication in Estonian was Lühhike öppetus (1766–1767), but Tarto maa rahva Näddali-Leht has been considered as the first newspaper published in that language.

A total of 39 issues were printed.

At the time Estonia was under Russian rule and emperor of Russia forbid the publishing of this newspaper in the end of 1806 and let all of the papers to be destroyed.
