= Peter Ernst Wilde =

Baltic German physician and Estophile

Peter Ernst Wilde (24 August [O.S. 13 August] 1732 – 28 December [O.S. 17 December] 1785) was a Baltic German physician and Enlightenment era Estophile. He lived in what was then the Russian Empire.

He is noted for establishing a printing house at Kuningamäe, Põltsamaa, Estonia, and printing the first Estonian periodical, Lühhike öppetus, there in 1766–1767. In 1771, he supplied material for Arsti ramat, the first Estonian medical manual. He lived in America for a short period.

Wilde was born in Woedtke, near Treptow an der Rega, and died, aged 53, in Põltsamaa
