= Grigori Kromanov =

Estonian film director

Grigori Kromanov (Russian: Григо́рий Ермович Кроманов; 8 March 1926 in Tallinn – 18 July 1984 in Lahe, Lääne-Virumaa) was an Estonian theatre and film director. He directed some of the best-known Estonian movies, including Viimne reliikvia (The Last Relic) and "Hukkunud Alpinisti" hotell (Dead Mountaineer's Hotel).

His 1976 film Briljandid proletariaadi diktatuurile (Diamonds for the Dictatorship of the Proletariat) is based on the 1974 detective novel of the same namne by Yulian Semyonov.
