= Lühhike öppetus =

First periodical publication in Estonian

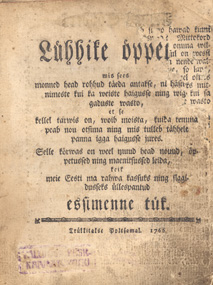
The title page. Due to wear and tear, some underlying pages are seen in upper right corner

Lühhike öppetus (Estonian for Brief Instruction), by modern orthography 'Lühike õpetus', was the first periodical publication in Estonian. Edited by Dr. Peter Ernst Wilde and printed for a short while in 1766–1767, it described various simple medical techniques intended to be usable in the field by peasants.

The full title of the newspaper was Lühhike öppetus mis sees moned head rohhud täeda antakse, ni hästi innimeste kui ka veiste haigusse ning viggaduste vasto, and it can be translated as Brief instruction announcing some good medicine, both for human and bovine ailments and traumas. It was printed weekly, with each issue having four pages. A total of 41 issues were printed.

August Wilhelm Hupel was responsible for translating the content into Estonian.

== Classification ==
Lühhike öppetus did not deal with news; thus, it is not universally classified as a newspaper — despite its format. Various sources refer to it as a magazine, a journal, or even a book published in 41 volumes. The first regular Estonian-language publication unequivocally considered a newspaper, Tarto maa rahva Näddali-Leht, appeared in 1807.

== See also ==
- Estophilia
