= Valmiera =

State city and capital of Valmiera Municipality, Latvia

Valmiera Wolmar
- State city
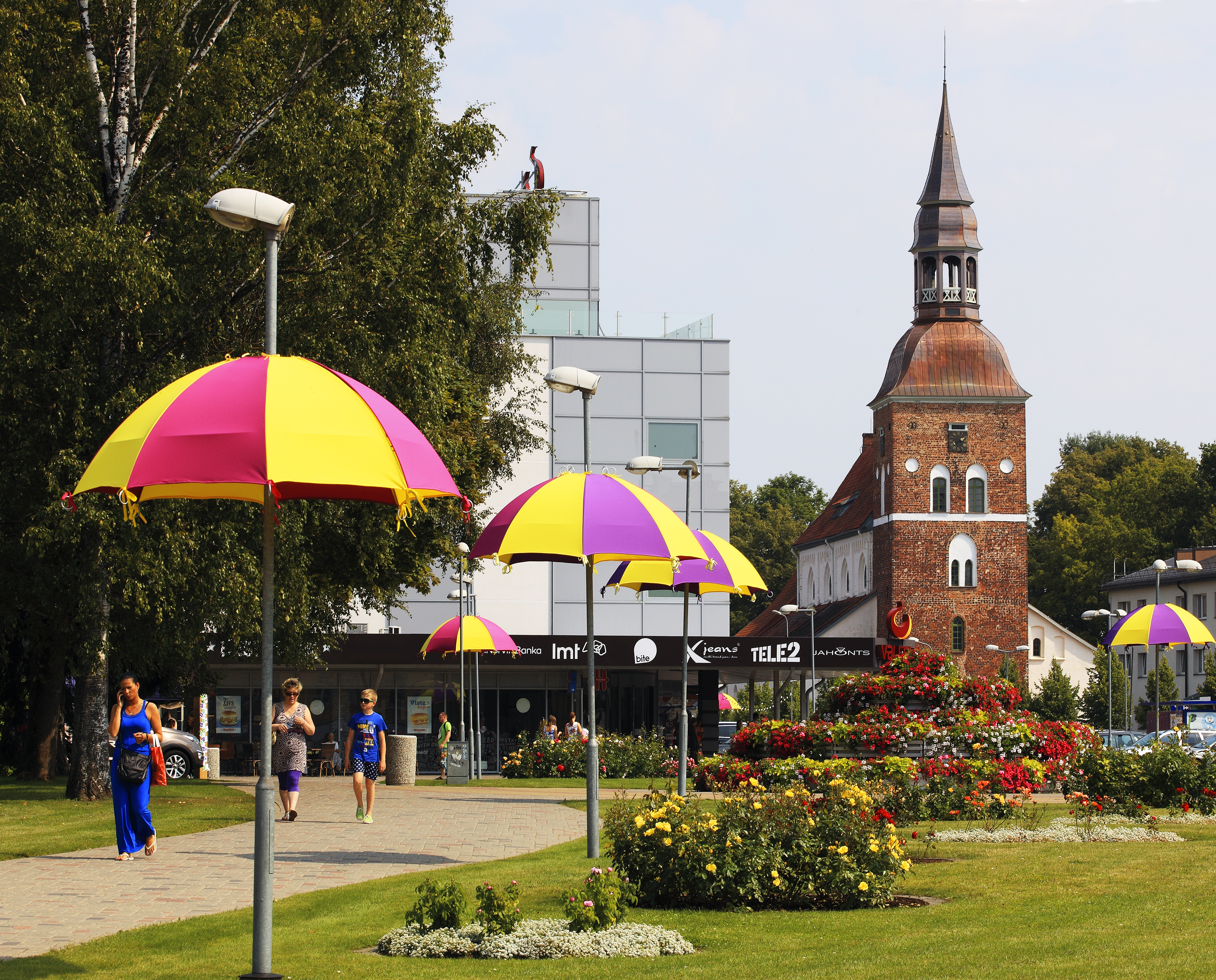
- City centre with St. Simon's Church behind

- Flag Coat of arms Brandmark
- Anthem: Stāv pāri visam Valmiera
- Location in Latvia
- Coordinates: 57°32′17″N 25°25′23″E
- Country: Latvia
- Municipality: Valmiera
- Town rights: 1323

Government
  - Mayor: Jānis Baiks (For Valmiera and Vidzeme)

Area
  - Total: 19.36 km^{2} (7.47 sq mi)
  - Water: 0.75 km^{2} (0.29 sq mi)

Population (2026)
  - Total: 22,746
  - Density: 1,175/km^{2} (3,043/sq mi)
- Demonym: Valmierieši

GDP
  - State city: 476,254,000 euro (2021)
  - Per capita: 20,846 euro (2021)
- Time zone: UTC+2 (EET)
  - Summer (DST): UTC+3 (EEST)
- Postal code: LV-4201 LV-4202 LV-4204
- Calling code: +371 642
- Number of municipal council members: 19
- Website: http://www.valmiera.lv/

Valmiera is the second largest city of the historical Vidzeme region, Latvia, with a total area of 19.35 square kilometres (7 square miles). As of 2002, Valmiera had a population of 27,323, and in 2020, it was at 24,879. It is a state city (although without a separate municipal government), and is the seat of the Valmiera Municipality. Valmiera is one of the oldest cities in Latvia; it was a member of the Hanseatic League. According to the ethnic composition, Valmiera has the largest proportion of ethnic Latvians among the state cities.

Valmiera lies at the crossroads of several important roads, 107 kilometres (66 miles) to the north-east from Riga, the capital of Latvia, and 50 km (31 mi) south of the border with Estonia. Valmiera lies on both banks of the Gauja River.

== Names and etymology ==
The name was derived from the Old German given name Waldemar or the Slavic name Vladimir. The town may have been named after the kniaz of the Principality of Pskov Vladimir Mstislavich, who became a vassal of Albert of Riga in 1212, and for a short time, it was a vogt of Tālava, Ydumea and Autīne. In another version, it may have been named after the King of Denmark Valdemar II, who allied with the Livonian Brothers of the Sword in the Livonian Crusade. In the second half of 13th century, the Livonian Order built a castle which they called Wolmar in German. During the Livonian War, the town was known in Russian as Володимерец (Volodimirec), but during the period of the Russian Empire, it was known as Вольмар (Wolmar).

== History ==
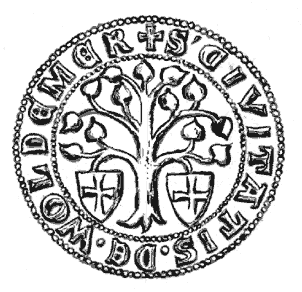
Coat of arms of the city of Valmiera (S 'Civitatis de Woldemer) as part of the State of the Teutonic Order in 1524

Valmiera and its surroundings have been one of the longest-inhabited regions of Latvia. Archeological evidence indicates the site was inhabited 9,000 years ago. In 1224 after partition of Tālava trade roads along the Gauja river became property of Livonian Brothers of the Sword who erected a castle which is today known as Valmiera Castle. After the Battle of Saule in 1236 Valmiera Castle and nearby lands became the property of the newly established Livonian Order.

Valmiera was first mentioned as a town in a chronicle dating back to 1323. The actual founding of the town probably occurred at least 40 years earlier when the master of the Livonian Order Wilken von Endorp constructed a castle (Wolmar) and Catholic church on the banks of the river Gauja. Valmiera was a member of the Hanseatic League from the 14th–16th centuries. Involvement in the Hansa brought significant trade and movement into the town's life. During the 14th–16th centuries several regional assemblies (landtags) were held in Valmiera. After the Livonian War in 1583 Valmiera was heavily devastated and was incorporated into the Duchy of Livonia as part of Wenden Voivodeship. After the Polish-Swedish war in 1622 Valmiera was managed by the Lord High Chancellor of Sweden Axel Oxenstierna.

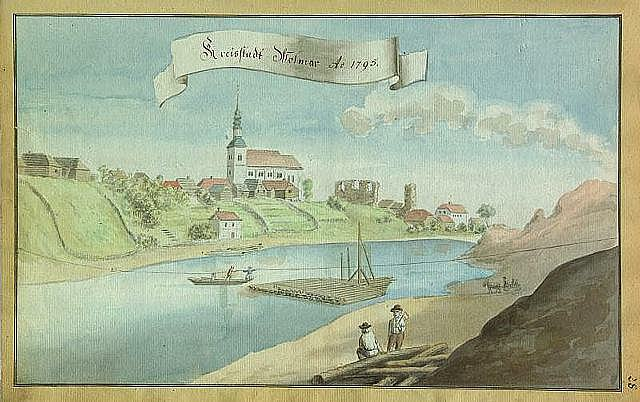
View of Valmiera in 1795

During the Great Northern War Valmiera was again destroyed and burned down in 1702. It was further devastated by plague. During the first half of the 18th century Valmiera was on the decline. In 1738 M.E. von Hallart opened the first seminary of the Moravian Church in Valmiera, a movement which played an important role in the history of Vidzeme. In 1785 Valmiera became the centre of a district. The town saw rapid development in the 19th century. First it was stimulated by the building of the first bridge over the river Gauja in 1865. Later the building of the Riga-St.Petersburg railway line through the town in 1899 also played a major role. Many new factories were built in the town and new settlements were growing on both banks of the river Gauja. During 1911–12 a narrow gauge railway line Ainaži-Valmiera-Smiltene was built thus making Valmiera a major transport hub. In 1906 Municipal elections were held and Valmiera was one of the few towns in Latvia where Latvians won the majority of seats (18 of 24). As a result, local doctor Georgs Apinis was elected as mayor. During the first quarter of the 20th century Valmiera also became a centre of culture and education as many schools were opened in the town. Among them were the Vidzeme teachers seminary, women gymnasium and merchant school.

During World War II, Valmiera was captured by troops of the German Army Group North on 4 July 1941 and placed under the administration of Reichskommissariat Ostland. In October 1941, 209 Jews from Valmiera and surrounding areas were murdered in local forests. The city was recaptured on 24 September 1944 by troops of the 3rd Baltic Front of the Red Army during the Riga Offensive. During the war almost all buildings at the center of Valmiera were destroyed.

The Cold War Liepas Air Base was located nearby.

Version 2.2 of the open source mapping application QGIS was named in honor of Valmiera.

== Development ==
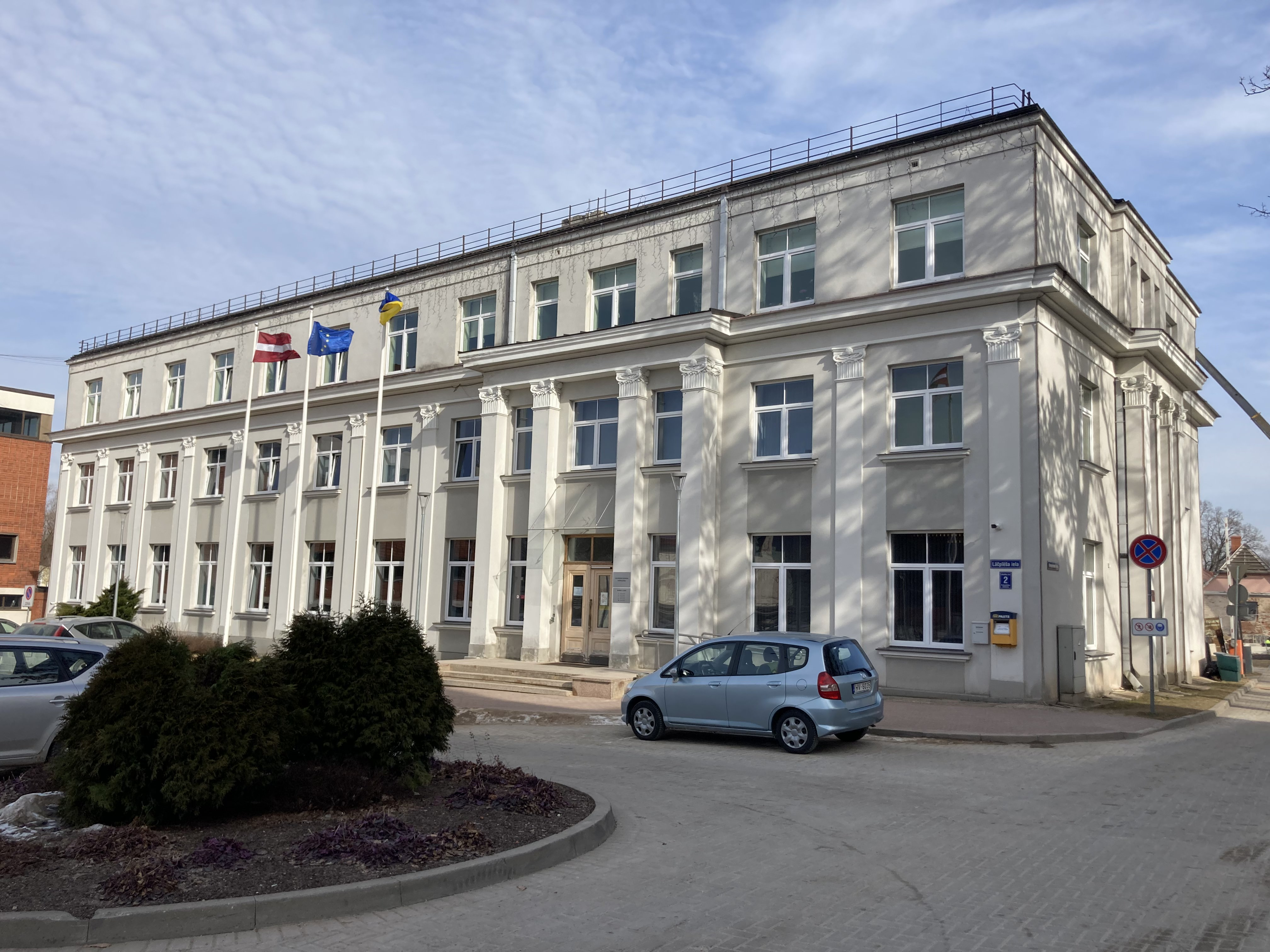
Valmiera City Council

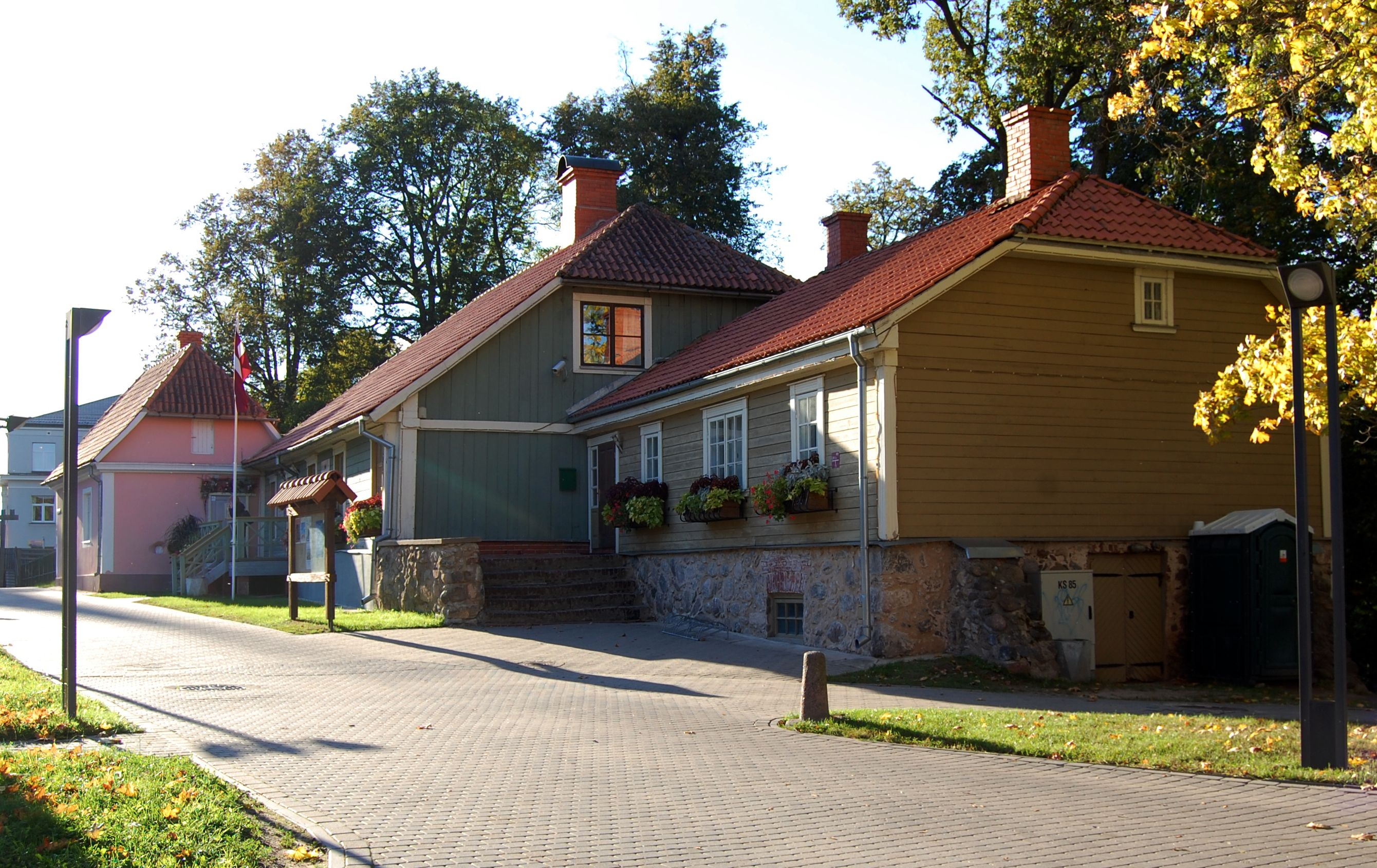
Valmiera Old Town

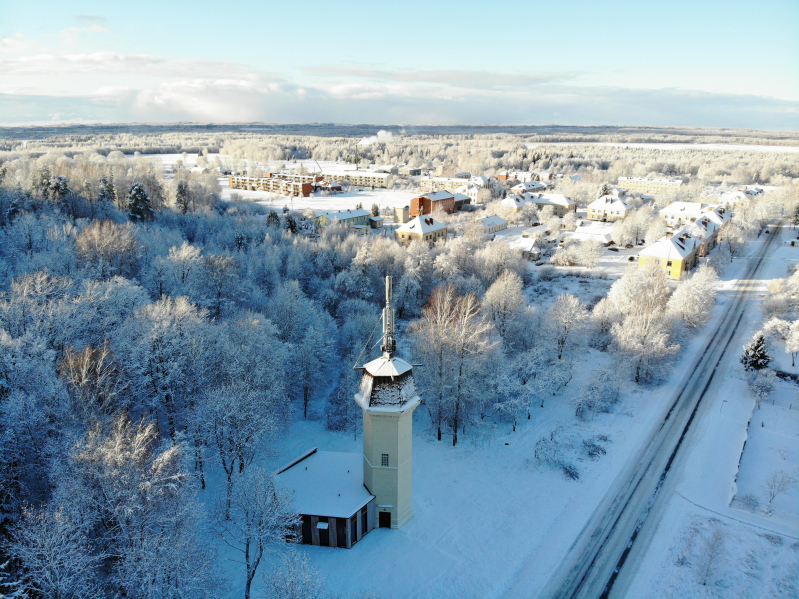
The Blue Hill (Zilaiskalns) in winter

Valmiera's municipality has been involved a variety of projects to improve the quality of life in the region.

Projects implemented lately

- Reconstruction of Valmiera Pārgauja State Gymnasium
- Reconstruction of Valmiera Viestura Secondary school
- Dwelling house of various social groups
- Pedestrian track and watch terrace
- Construction of Māris Štrombergs BMX track “Valmiera”
- Construction of Valmiera Western Industrial highway
- Co-creation workshop “DARE”
- Reconstruction of Jānis Daliņš Stadium and construction of light athletics hall
- Valmiera Old Town development – Ziloņu Street
- Hybrid buses in the city
- Construction of woodchip boiler house

Ongoing projects

- Dormitory for pupils
- Valmiera Old Town development – Valmiera Palace cultural center
- Recreational and playground areas
- Two electric buses in the city
- Construction of Valmiera Southern Industrial highway
- Career Development Support Program
- Renovation of Valmiera Drama Theater

Valmiera is an important industrial centre. The dominating economic branches in Valmiera are the food industry, fibreglass production, metalworking, wood processing and furniture production.

TOP 5 companies by turnover (Lursoft, 2018)

- “Valmieras Glass Group” JSC
- Cooperative “VAKS”
- "Valmieras piens" JSC
- “Dizozols”, Ltd
- Cooperative society of agricultural service dairy farmers “PIENA LOĢISTIKA”

== Education ==
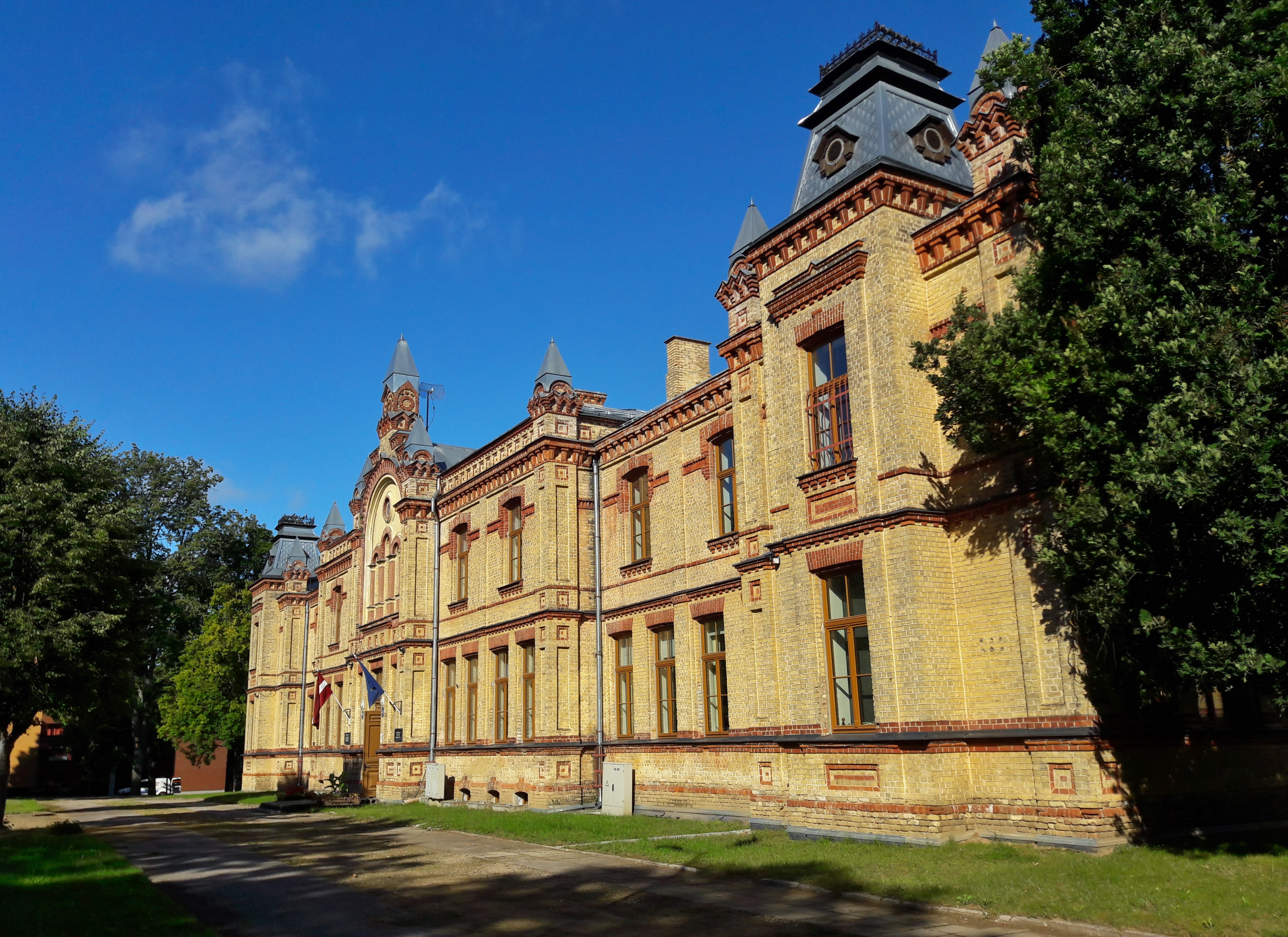
Valmiera State Gymnasium

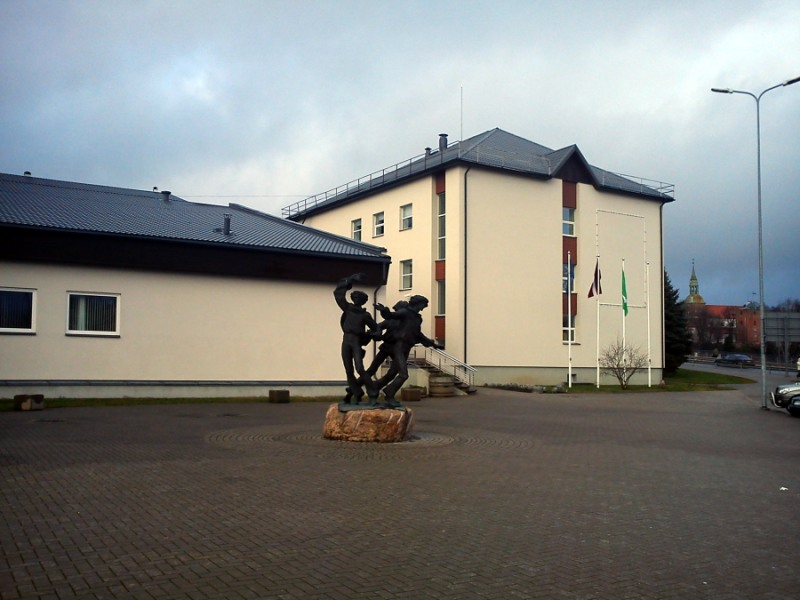
Vidzeme University of Applied Sciences is a state higher education institution with 17 study programmes

A full cycle education is provided in Valmiera – starting from pre-schools until higher education and lifelong education institutions. City provides full-range of education:

- 8 Kindergartens
- 2 Primary Schools
- 4 Secondary Schools, including special education for disabled children
- 2 State Gymnasiums
- Valmiera Music School
- Valmiera Sports School
- Valmiera Youth Centre "Vinda"
- Valmiera School of Design and Art
- Valmiera Vocational Education and Training School
- Vidzeme University of Applied Sciences
- Lifelong learning
- Toma Kaleja school for special children

In the academic year of 2019 and 2020, 1625 children attended preschool educational institutions in Valmiera and 4084 students attended general education institutions.

The local government invests significantly into the development of the educational infrastructure. More than 50% of Valmiera annual budget is spent on a development of education in the city.

In 2016, Valmiera was included in UNESCO Global Network of Learning Cities (UNESCO GNLC). Its aim is to jointly seek for solutions to globalization, urbanization, demographics and other 21st century urban development challenges.

== Culture ==
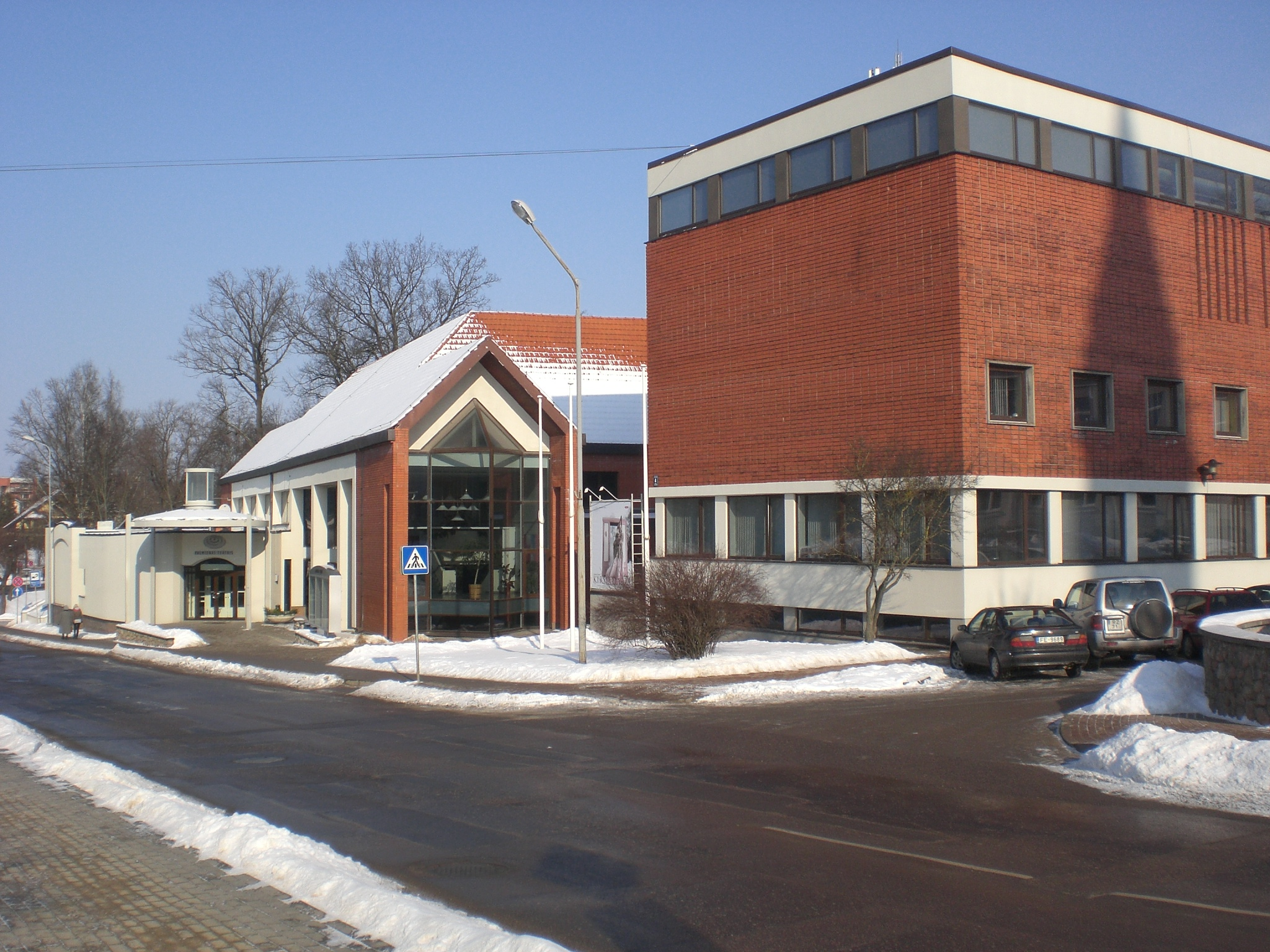
Valmiera Drama Theatre

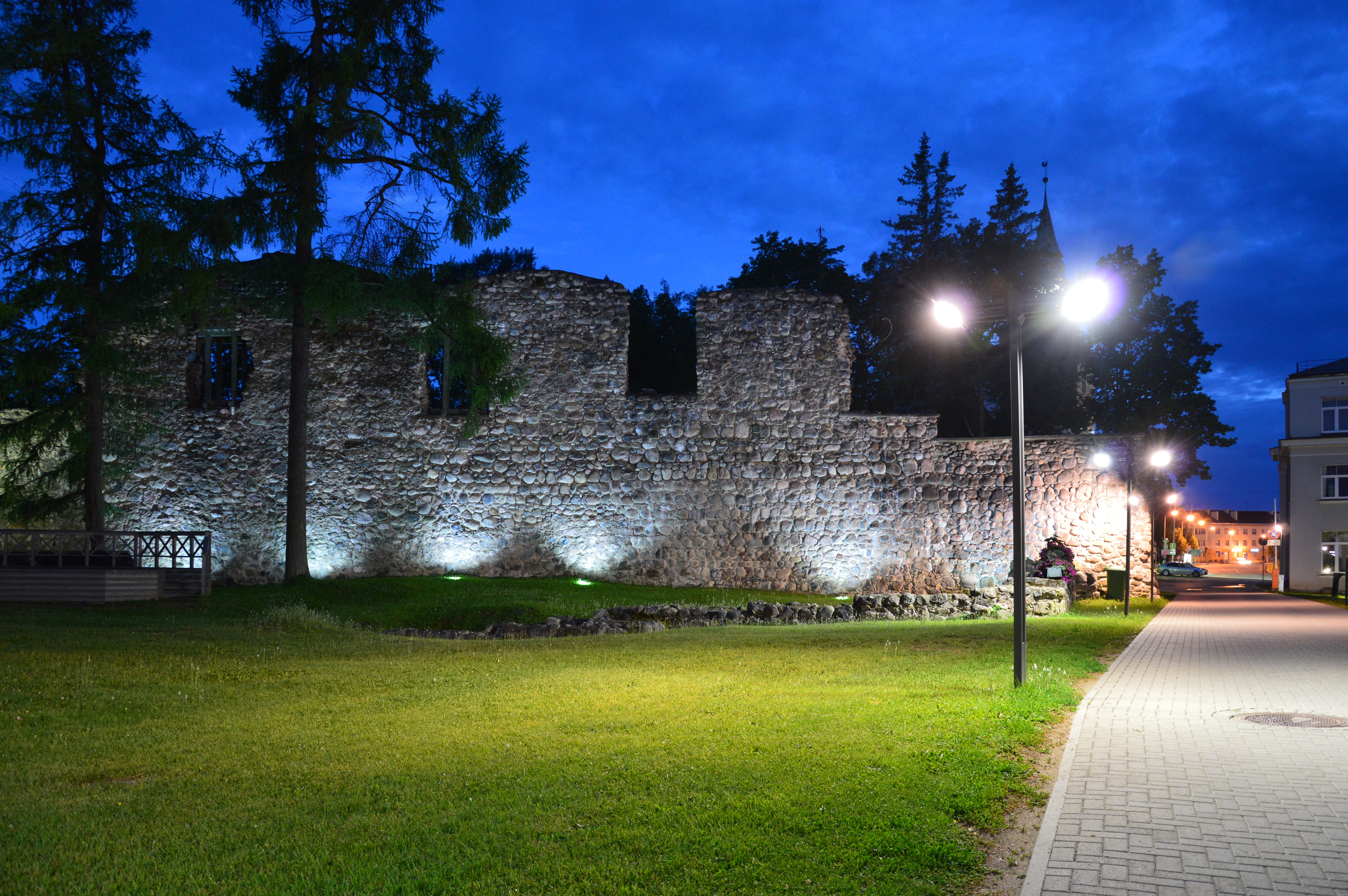
Ruins of the Valmiera Castle, built in the 13th century, is used as an open-air venue for concerts and celebrations

Culture facilities in Valmiera

- Valmiera Drama Theatre
- Valmiera Culture centre
- Cinema "3D CINEMA" (kino "Gaisma")
- Concert hall "Valmiera"
- Valmiera Integrated library
- Valmiera Museum
- Art Gallery „Laipa”
- Gallery „Leduspagrabs”

Festivals and annual events in Valmiera

- International Winter Music Festival
- International competition for young pianists
- Valmiera Summer Theatre Festival
- Valmiera City Festival
- Simjūds’ Fair
- Summer concerts by the Valmiera Music School
- cinema festival "Kino Pedālis"
- Art month of Valmiera

== Sports ==
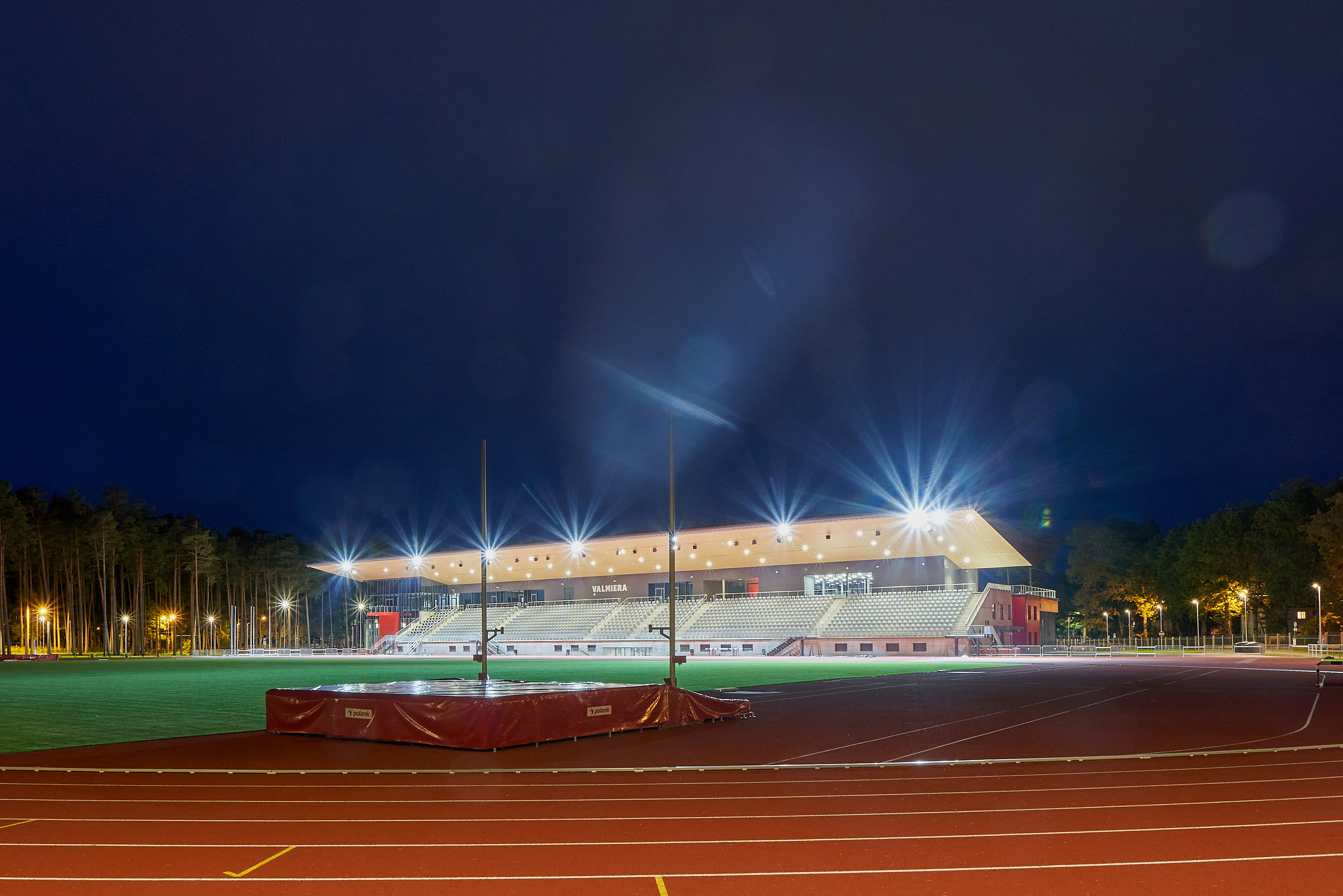
Jānis Daliņš Stadium

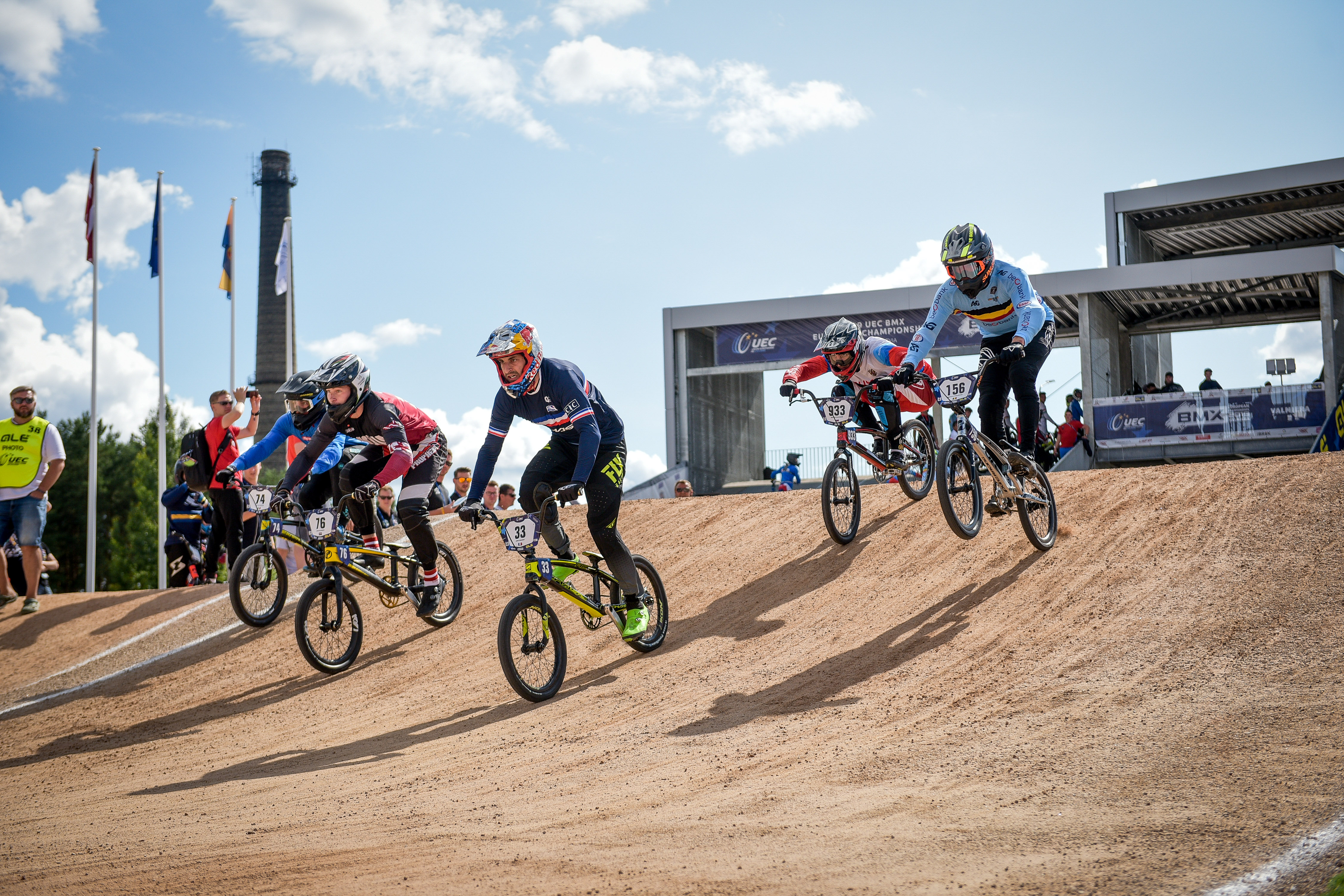
2019 European BMX Championship on Māris Štrombergs BMX track

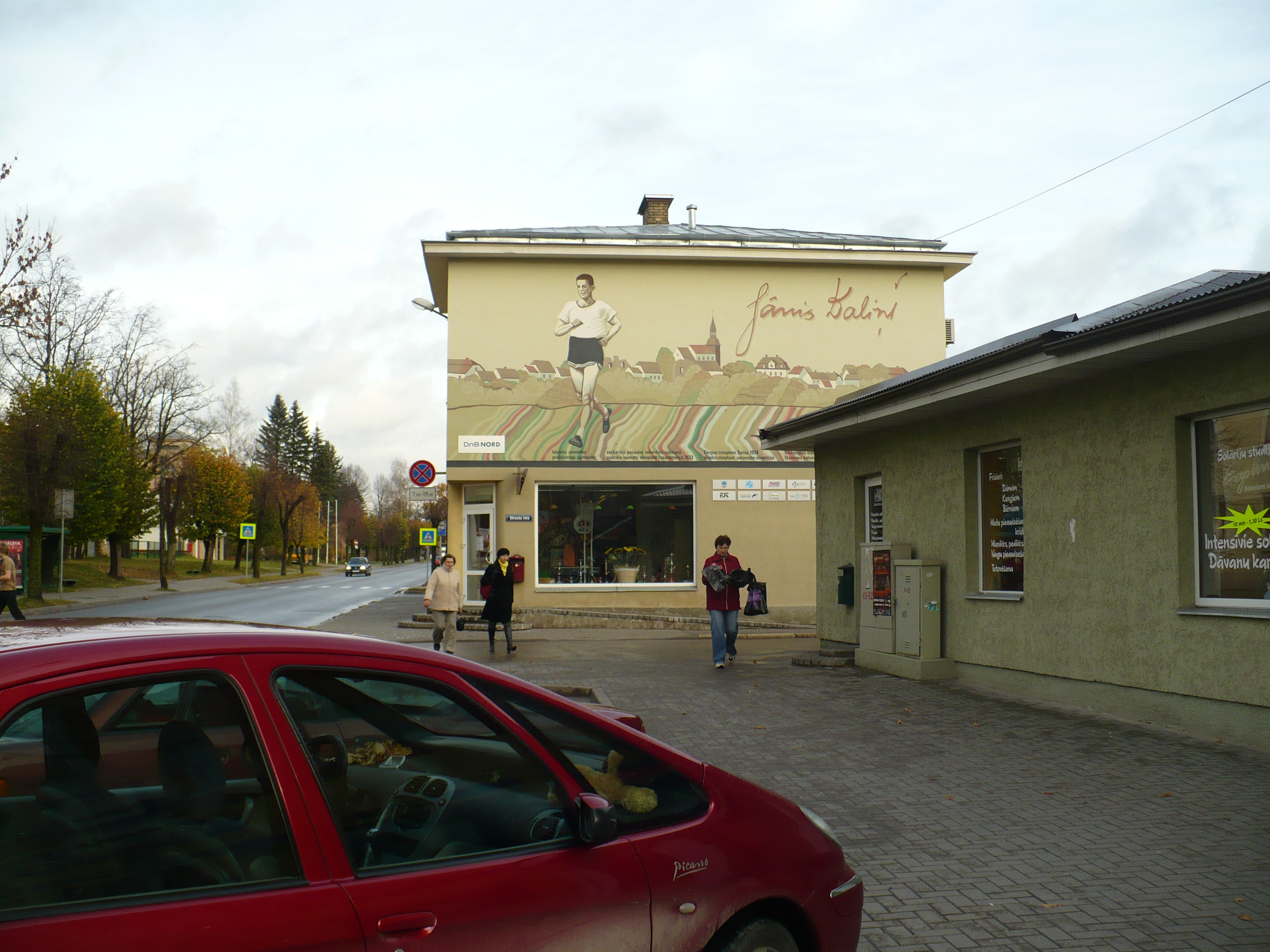
The wall dedicated to Jānis Dāliņš

In Valmiera, sports and an active lifestyle have historically been one of the city's main priorities. Over 40 sports organisations operate in Valmiera representing more than 30 different sports. The Valmiera Children's Sports School with over 1,200 pupils is the fourth biggest sports school in Latvia.

In the 1932 Summer Olympics in Los Angeles, the Valmiera-born Jānis Daliņš won a silver medal – the first ever Olympic medal won by Latvia. In honour of the athlete's achievements, in 1938 Valmiera Stadium was named after Jānis Daliņš. Many Olympians have come from Valmiera including BMX riders Ivo Lakučs, Edžus Treimanis, Rihards Veide and a two-time Olympic champion Māris Štrombergs. In turn, Jolanta Dukure, Arnis Rumbenieks and Aigars Fadējevs are race walkers, whose sporting roots can be found in Valmiera, as is the case with the initial sporting careers of bobsleigh racers Oskars Ķibermanis and Oskars Melbārdis.

Biggest sports teams:

- Valmiera Basketball Club – 2015/2016 Latvian Basketball League Champions
- Valmiera Floorball Club – 2017/2018 Floorball Latvia League runners-up
- Valmiera Football Club – 2022 Latvian Higher Football League Champions
- Valmiera Glass ViA – competing in Latvian-Estonian Basketball League

Annually, the biggest sports events held in the city are as follows:

- the State President's Athletics Competition
- Valmiera Marathon
- MTB Marathon
- “Rīga-Valmiera” Running and Walking Race
- Latvian Open Floorball Tournament
- the European Championship Qualification Games in Men's Handball

The biggest sport events to be held in Valmiera are:

- 2011 FIBA Basketball World Championship U-19 Junior Sub-Group Games
- 2014 Davis Cup Group Ties in Tennis
- 2018 IFF World Championship Men's Floorball Qualification Tournament
- BMX European Championships 2019

== Twin towns – sister cities ==
Valmiera is twinned with:

- Solna, Sweden (1991)
- Viljandi, Estonia (1992)
- Gütersloh (district), Germany (1994)
- Høje-Taastrup, Denmark (1995)
- Zduńska Wola, Poland (2001)
- Pskov, Russia (2002)
- Barysaw, Belarus (2010)
- Halle, Germany (2011)
- Siyazan, Azerbaijan (2014)
- Vallefoglia, Italy (2016)
- Cherkasy, Ukraine (2022)

== Gallery ==
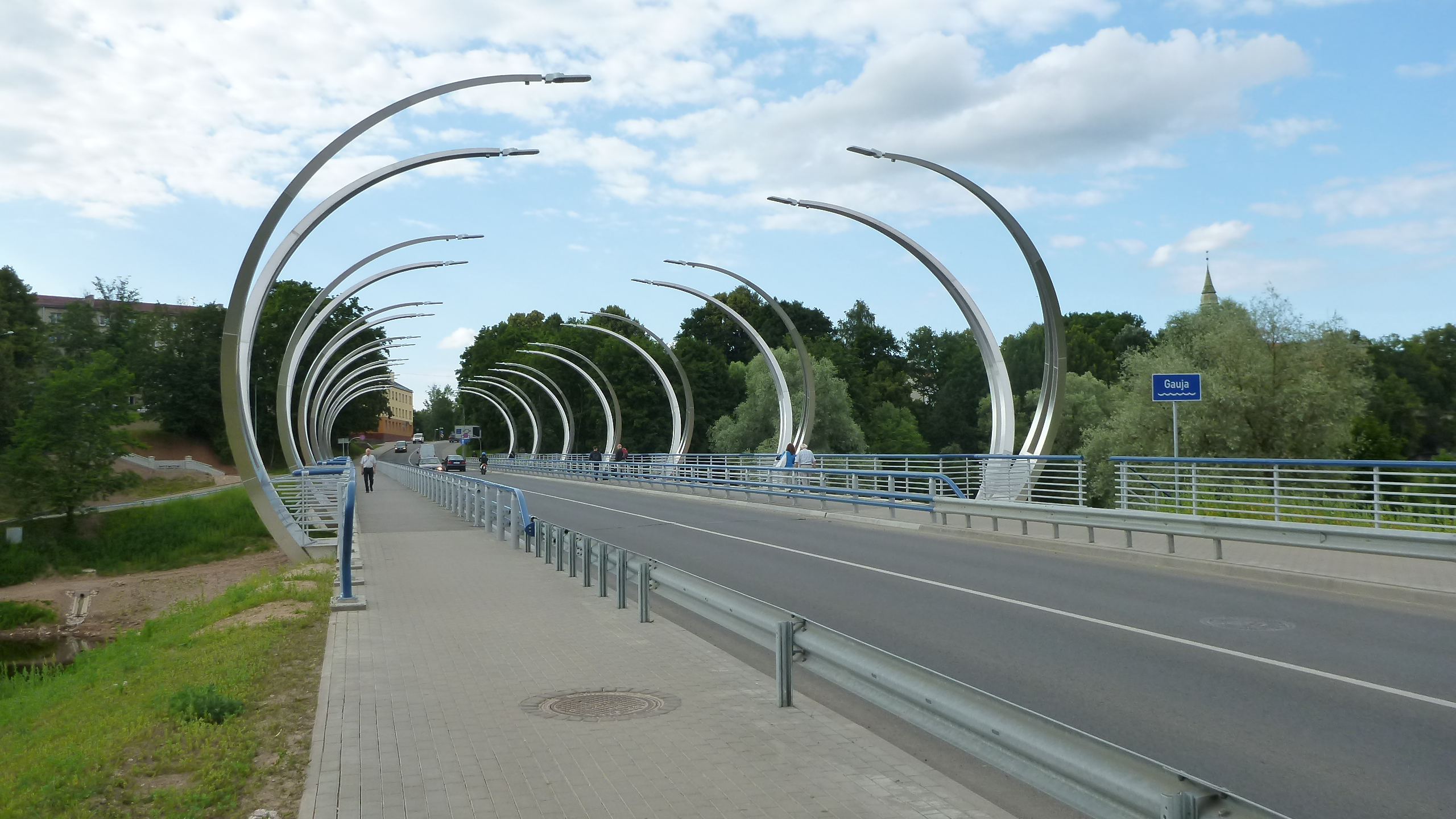
Bridge over Gauja river

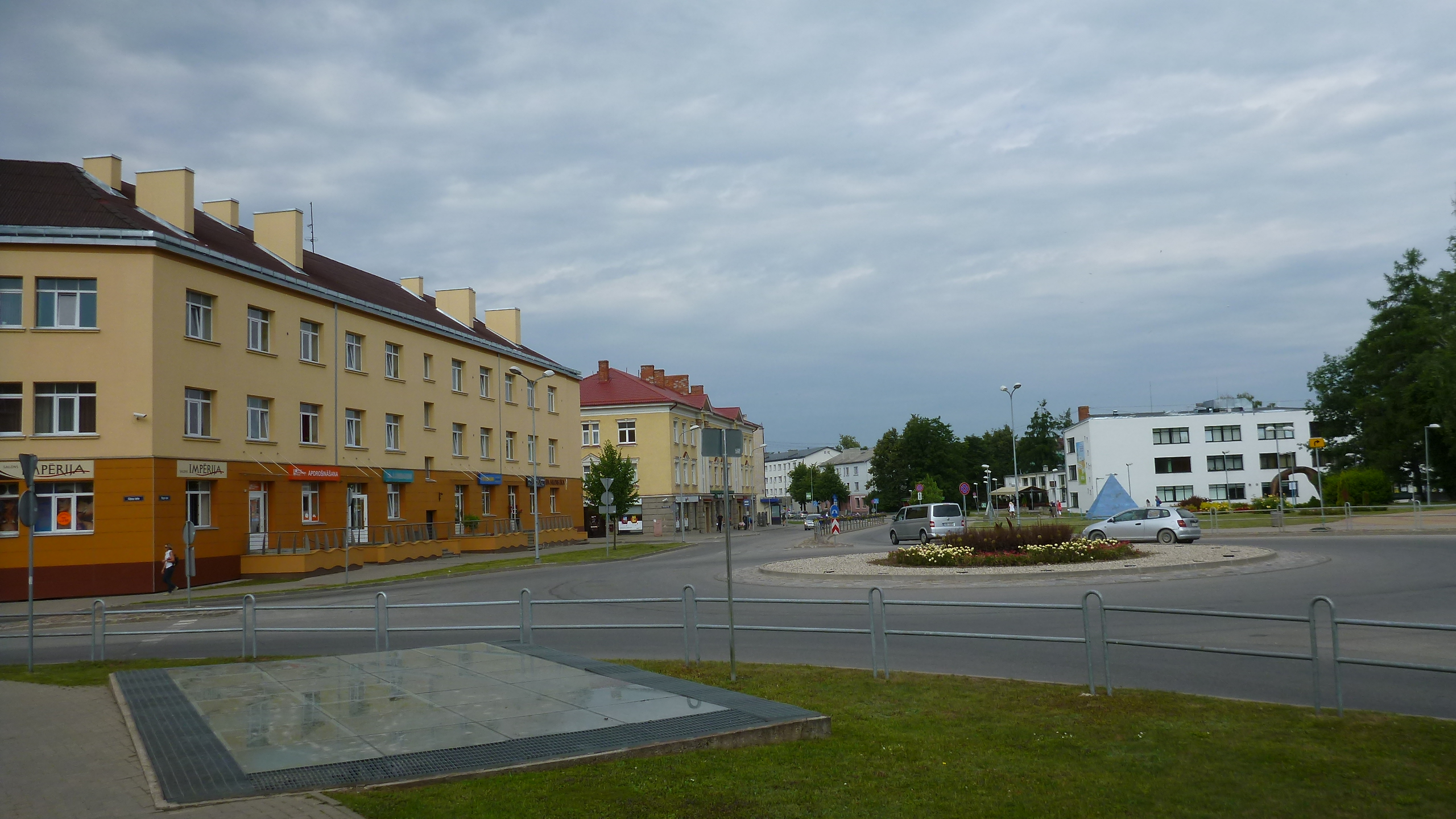
Riga street in the city centre

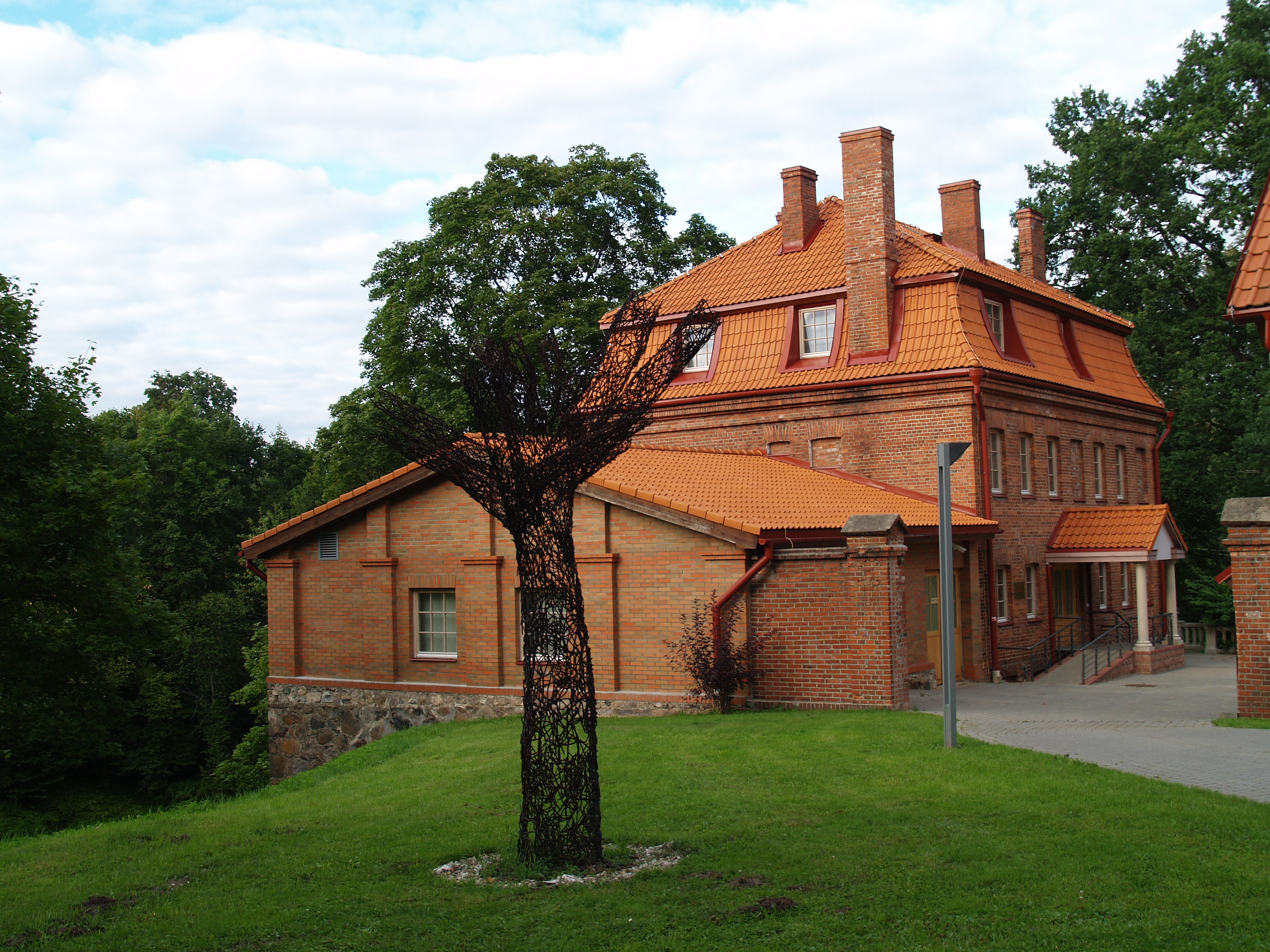
Valmiera city museum

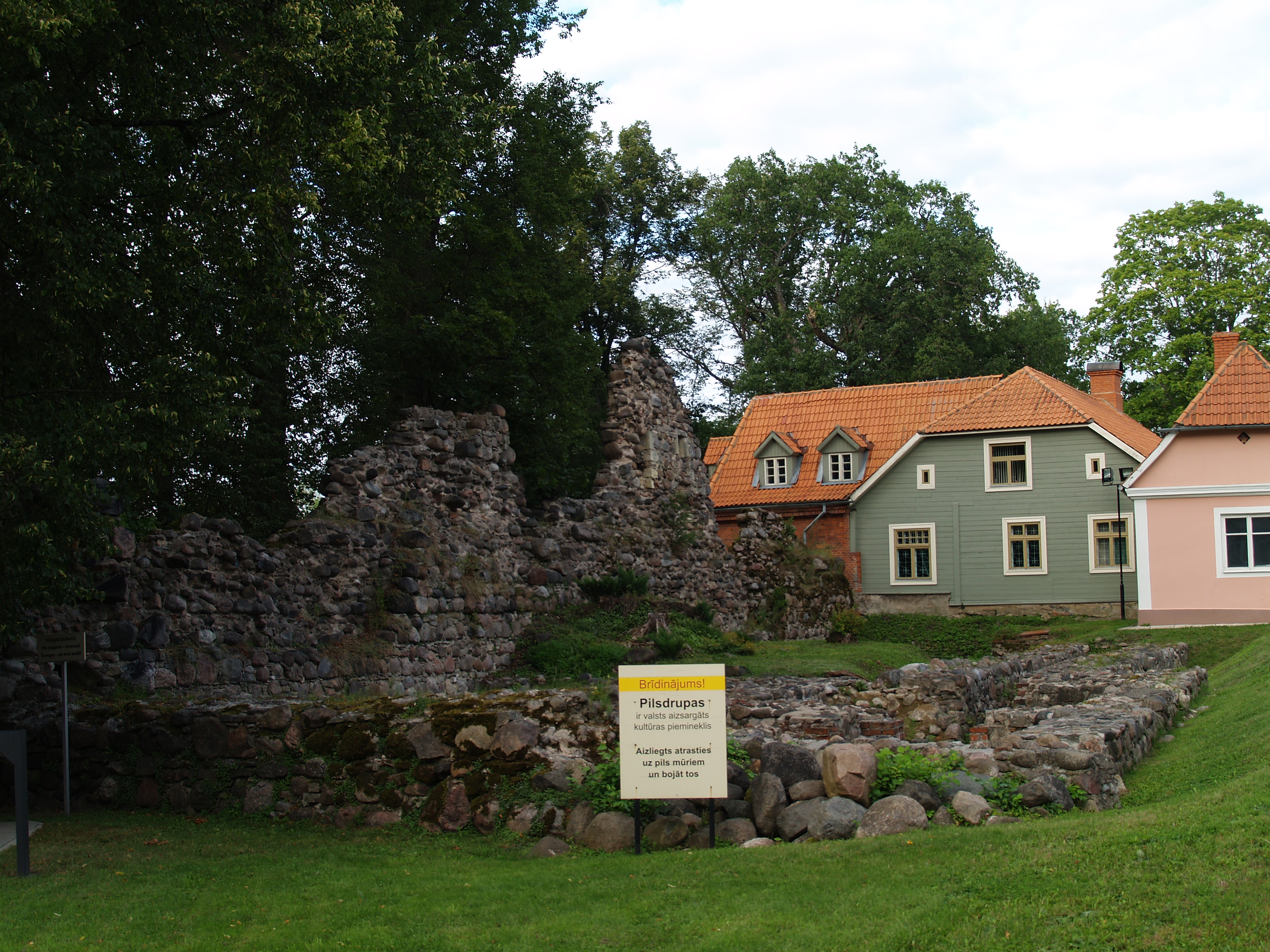
Castle ruins

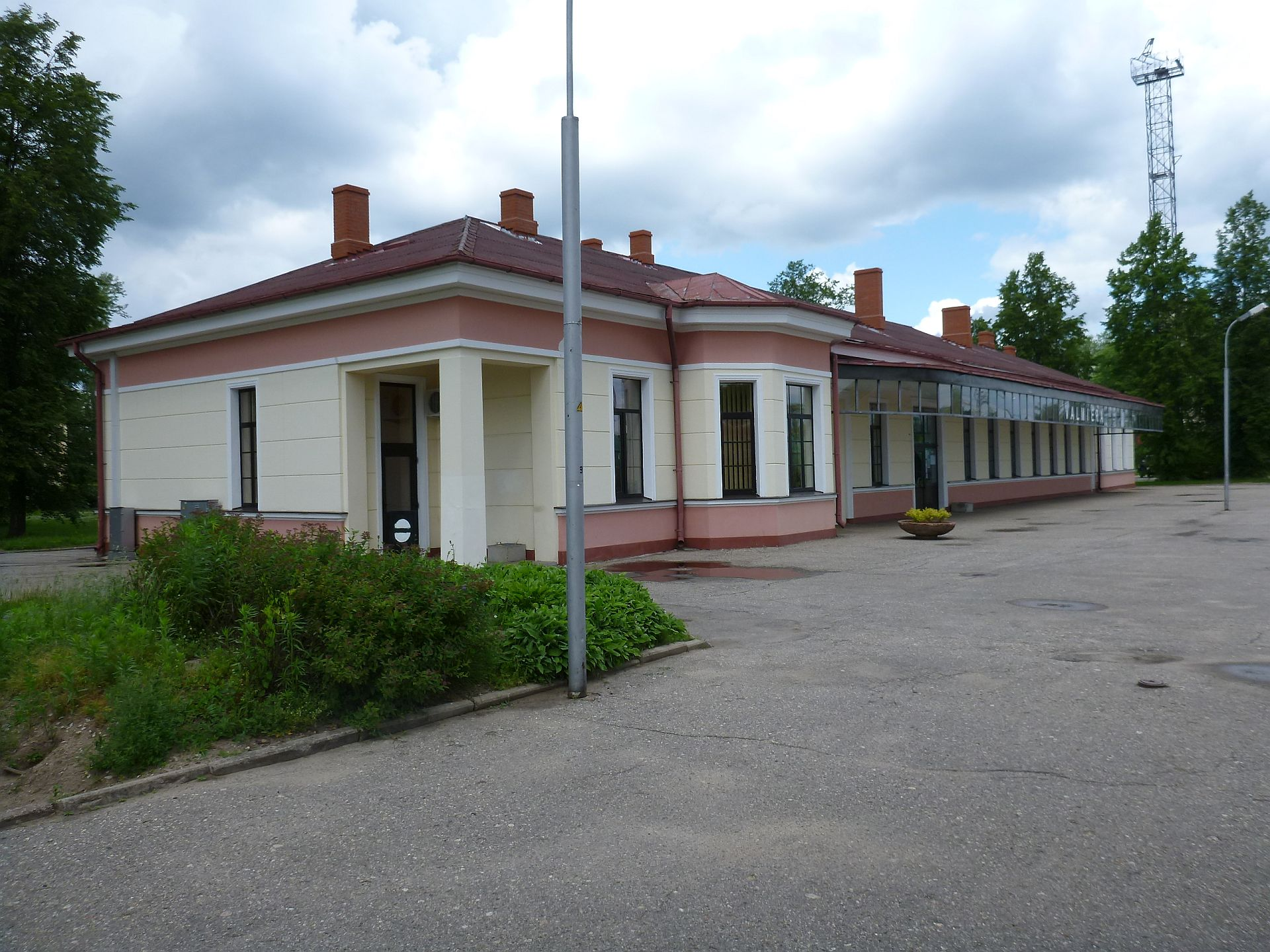
Railway station

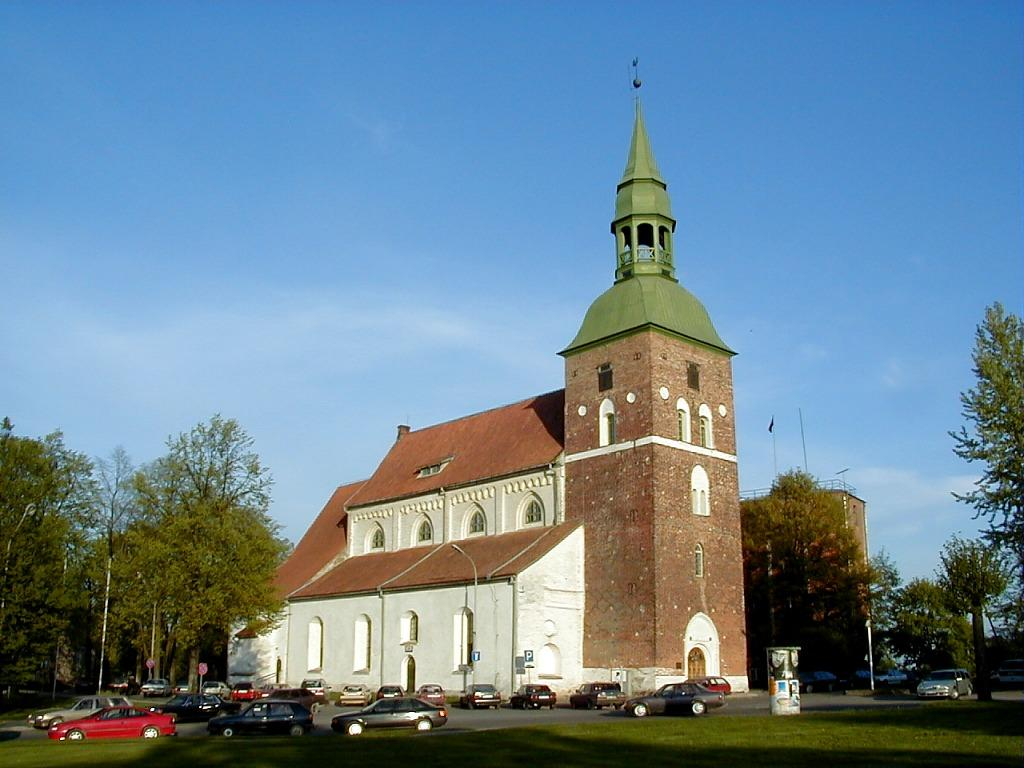
St. Simon Lutheran church

== Notable people ==
- Johann Heinrich Rosenplänter (1782–1846), a Baltic German linguist and Estophile.
- Johann Eduard Erdmann (1805–1892), Lutheran pastor, historian of philosophy, and philosopher of religion
- Jāzeps Vītols (1863–1948), composer
- Teodors Ūders (1868–1915), painter
- Velta Ruke-Dravina (1917–2003), Swedish linguist, folklorist, professor
- Visvaldis Lācis (1924–2020), linguist, historian and politician
- Imants Freibergs (1934–2026), computer scientist
- Maija Einfelde (born 1939), composer
- Andris Piebalgs (born 1957), politician, diplomat
- Arturs Maskats (born 1957), composer
- Ģirts Ķesteris (born 1964), actor

=== Sport ===
- Jānis Daliņš (1904–1978), race walker, won a silver medal at the 1932 Summer Olympics
- Ivars Bērzups (born 1963), bobsledder and businessman.
- Ainārs Ķiksis (born 1972), cyclist
- Ivo Lakučs (born 1979), cyclist
- Gatis Kalniņš (born 1981), footballer, played about 300 games and 19 for Latvia
- Māris Štrombergs (born 1987), BMX racer; won gold medals at the 2008 & 2012 Summer Olympics
- Edžus Treimanis born (1988), BMW racer
- Arnis Rumbenieks (born 1988), athlete, competing in road walking
- Oskars Melbārdis (born 1988), bobsledder, has won one gold and two bronze Olympic medals
- Dairis Bertāns (born 1989), basketball player
- Dāvis Bertāns (born 1992), basketball player
- Roberts Savaļnieks (born 1993), footballer, played about 380 games and 75 for Latvia
- Rolands Šmits (born 1995), basketball player
- Agate Caune (born 2004), track and field athlete

== See also ==
- Valmiera Drama Theatre
