= Saule, Pērkons, Daugava =

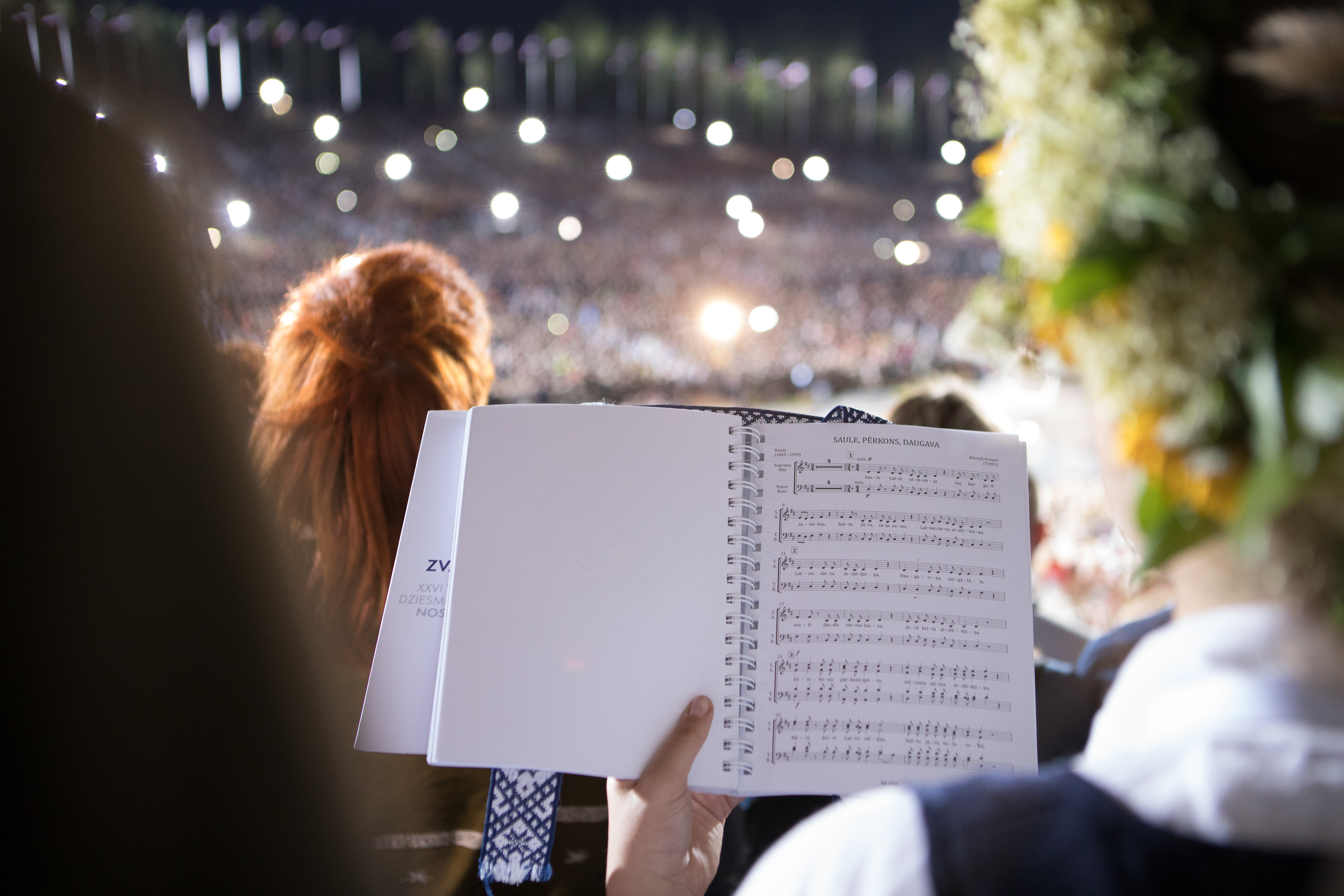
The song being performed at the 2018 Latvian Song and Dance Festival

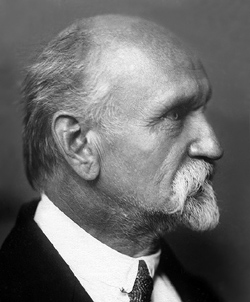
Rainis, the author of the poem Daugava

"Saule, Pērkons, Daugava" is a Latvian choir song. The text originates from the 1916 poem Daugava by the Latvian poet Rainis, while the musical part is composed by Mārtiņš Brauns.

The song was first performed in the Valmiera Drama Theatre in 1988. In 1990 it was performed at the Latvian Song and Dance Festival and quickly became a musical symbol of the Singing Revolution. After Latvia regained its independence, the song remained highly popular and there was even a discussion of it becoming the new national anthem.

In 2014, an adapted version of the song with lyrics of Miquel Martí i Pol, titled Ara és l'hora became the official anthem of the Catalan independence movement.

In 2018, it was voted the best Latvian song by listeners of the Radio SWH radio station, winning a plurality of the nearly 137,000 votes cast.

== Lyrics ==
Latvian original text

Saule Latvi sēdināja
Tur, kur gali satiekas.
Balta jūra, zaļa zeme,
Latvei vārtu atslēdziņa.

Latvei vārtu atslēdziņa,
Daugaviņas sargātāja.
Sveši ļaudis vārtus lauza
Jūrā krita atslēdziņa.

Zilzibeņu pērkons spēra,
velniem ņēma atslēdziņu.
Nāvi, dzīvi Latve slēdza,
Baltu jūru, zaļu zemi

Saule Latvi sēdināja
Baltas jūras maliņā,
Vēji smiltis putināja —
ko lai dzēra latvju bērni?

Saule lika Dieviņami,
Lai tas raka Daugaviņu.
Zvēri raka, Dieviņš lēja
No mākoņa dzīvūdeņi.

Dzīves ūdens, nāves ūdens
Daugavā satecēja.
Es pamērcu pirkstu galu
Abus jūtu dvēselē.

Nāves ūdens, dzīves ūdens —
Abus jūtam dvēselē.

Saule mūsu māte —
Daugav' — sāpju aukle.
Pērkons velna spērējs,
Tas mūsu tēvs.

English translation

Latvia was laid down by the Sun,
Where the ends came together.
White sea, green land.
Latvia had the key of the gate.

Latvia had the key of the gate,
The protector of Daugava.
Strangers tried to break the gate,
The key fell deep into the sea.

The ground was struck by blue lightning,
The key taken from the devils.
Death and life Latvia locked in,
White sea, green land.

Latvia was laid down by the Sun
On the white sea’s land,
Wind blew over the sand.
What will the children of Latvia drink?

The sun ordered God
To dig out the Daugava.
Animals dug it out, God filled it
With water from a cloud.

Water of life, water of death
Flowed in Daugava,
I dipped in a finger tip
And felt both in my soul.

Water of death, water of life —
We felt both in our soul.

Sun was our mother,
Daugava the nanny of our pain,
Thunder was the devil’s striker,
That was our father
