= Mārtiņš Brauns =

Latvian composer and musician (1951–2021)

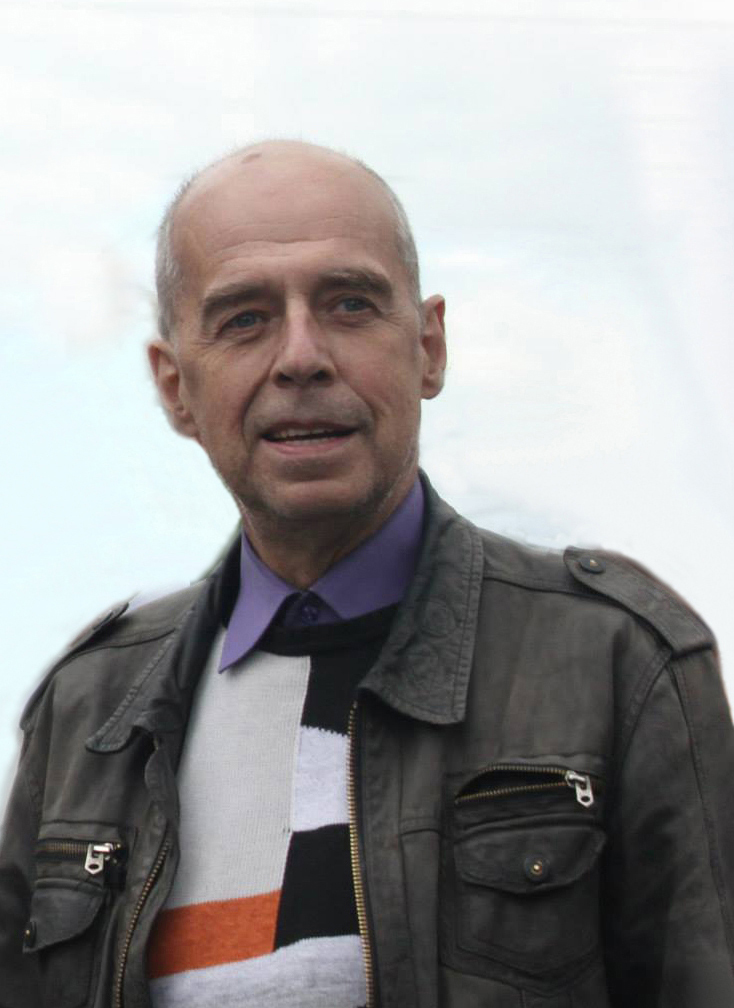
- Brauns in 2015

Background information
- Born: 17 September 1951; Riga, Latvian SSR, Soviet Union
- Died: 24 November 2021 (aged 70) Riga, Latvia
- Occupations: Composer musician
- Instruments: Synthesizer; Piano; Vocal; Guitar; Harmonica
- Years active: 1968–2021

Mārtiņš Brauns (17 September 1951 – 24 November 2021) was a Latvian composer and musician.

He composed multiple pieces, most notable of which is Saule, Pērkons, Daugava, a choir song regularly performed at the Latvian Song and Dance Festival.

== Career ==
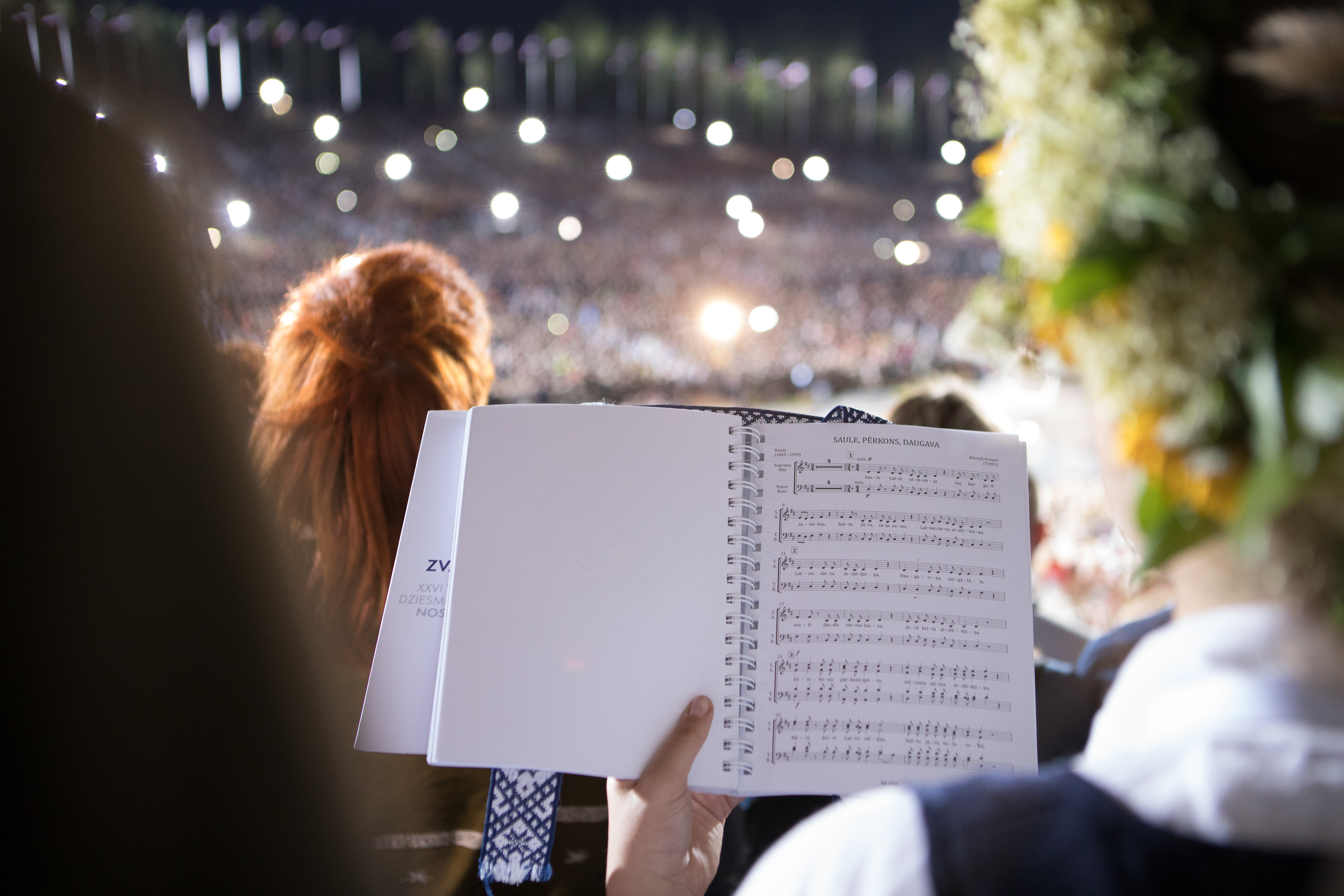
Saule, Pērkons, Daugava being performed at the 2018 Latvian Song and Dance Festival

Brauns studied at the Emīls Dārziņš Music School from 1958 to 1970, studying piano and choir, before moving on to study conducting and music theory after his voice started changing. He then studied at the Jāzeps Vītols Latvian Academy of Music between 1970 and 1976.

From 1975 to 1986, he led the rock band Sīpoli. From 1986 and until his death, Brauns was a member of the Latvian Filmmakers Union and has composed music for various films.

In addition to film scores, Brauns wrote and composed multiple pieces for various theatre plays. His most famous piece, written in the late 1980s for the Valmiera Drama Theatre, titled Saule, Pērkons, Daugava, of which the lyrics are based on the poem Daugava by Latvian poet Rainis; this song has been performed regularly at the Latvian Song and Dance Festival since 1990, and is even considered the unofficial anthem of the festival. In 2014, an adapted version of the song with lyrics by Catalan poet Miquel Martí i Pol became the official anthem of the Catalan independence movement.

== Death ==
Brauns was recovering from a heart attack at a hospital when he contracted COVID-19. He died on 24 November 2021, at the age of 70.

== Awards ==
In 2001, Brauns received an award from the Ministry of Culture of Latvia for his "bright creative contribution to the enrichment of Latvian culture" in his work with his album Sapnis par Rīgu. The album also won a Grawemeyer Award in a world music competition for works composed between 2001 and 2004.

On 3 May 2018, Brauns was made Officer of the Order of the Three Stars, the highest civilian order in Latvia.

In 2019, Brauns received the Golden Microphone Lifetime Contribution Award for his work to enhance Latvian culture.
