= Madis Lepajõe =

Estonian sport personnel and politician (1955–2020)

Madis Lepajõe (1 May 1955 Pushkin, Leningrad Oblast – 21 May 2020 Tartu) was an Estonian cyclist, sport personnel and politician.

His younger sister was classical philologist, translator and religious historian Marju Lepajõe. From 1998 to 2004 he was the general secretary of Worldloppet. From 2009 to 2017 he was vice-president of European Cycling Union (UEC). From 2006 to 2012 he was vice-president of Estonian Cycling Federation. He was one of the founders of the club Klubi Tartu Maraton in 1991.

From 2017 to 2020 he was vice-mayor of Tartu.

Awards:

- 2003: state sport prize
