= Seppo Kuusisto =

Finnish historian and Estophile

Seppo Kuusisto (13 November 1945 – 3 January 2005) was a Finnish historian and Estophile.

He was the head of Tuglas Society (Finnish: Tuglas-seura).

In 2001, he was awarded with Order of the Cross of Terra Mariana, IV Class.
