= Asja Lācis =

Latvian actor and theatre director (1891–1979)

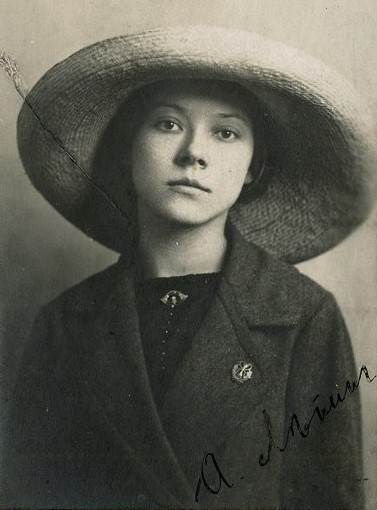
- Portrait of Lācis, c. 1912-14.
- Born: Anna Liepiņa; 19 October 1891; Līgatne, Governorate of Livonia, Russian Empire
- Died: 21 November 1979 (aged 88); Riga, Latvian SSR, Soviet Union
- Occupations: Actress, theatre director, writer
- Spouse(s): Jūlijs Lācis (m. 1914), Bernard Reich
- Writing career
- Genre: Epic theatre

Anna "Asja" Lācis (née Liepiņa; Russian: Анна 'Ася' Эрнестовна Лацис, Anna 'Asya' Ernestovna Latsis; German: Asja Lazis; October 19, 1891 – November 21, 1979) was a Latvian actress and theatre director.

== Biography ==
She was born into the family of a factory worker. A Bolshevik, in the twenties she became famous for her proletarian theatre troupes for children and agitprop in Soviet Russia and Latvia. She believed that children's theatre could be used as the cornerstone for the children's general education, which was especially important with poor, proletarian children who often had little or no other educational opportunities.

In 1922 she moved to Germany where she got to know Bertolt Brecht and Erwin Piscator, to whom she introduced the ideas of Vsevolod Meyerhold and Vladimir Mayakovsky.

In 1924 she met the German philosopher and critic Walter Benjamin in Capri, and the duo would have an intermittent affair for the next several years as he visited her in Moscow and Riga. She has been cited as a factor in Benjamin's embracing Marxism. In 1928, Benjamin dedicated a collection of essays to her.

In 1938 during Stalin's Great Purge she was deported to Siberia. Lācis was released and returned to Soviet Latvia in 1948 and spent her old age together with her husband, the German theatre critic Bernhard Reich. From 1948 to 1957 she was the main director of Valmiera Drama Theatre and used the leftist avant-garde techniques in her stage productions.

Lācis' granddaughter is the acclaimed Latvian theatre director Māra Ķimele.

== Sources ==
- Ingram, Susan (2002). "The Writing of Asja Lacis". New German Critique. 86 (86): 159–177. doi:10.2307/3115205. JSTOR 3115205.
- Ķimele, Dagmāra and Strautmane, Gunta. Asja: režisores Annas Lāces dēkainā dzīve [Asja: The Stormy Life of the director Anna Lāce]. Riga: Likteņstāsti, 1996.
- Lacis, Asja.Revolutionär in Beruf: Berichte über proletarisches Theater, über Meyerhold, Brecht, Benjamin und Piscator. München: Rogner & Bernhard, 1971.
- Latsis, Anna (1984). Krasnaia gvozdika: Vospominaniia (in Russian). Riga: Liesma. OCLC 13003307.(memoirs)
