= Marju Lepajõe =

Estonian classical philologist, translator, and historian (1962–2019)

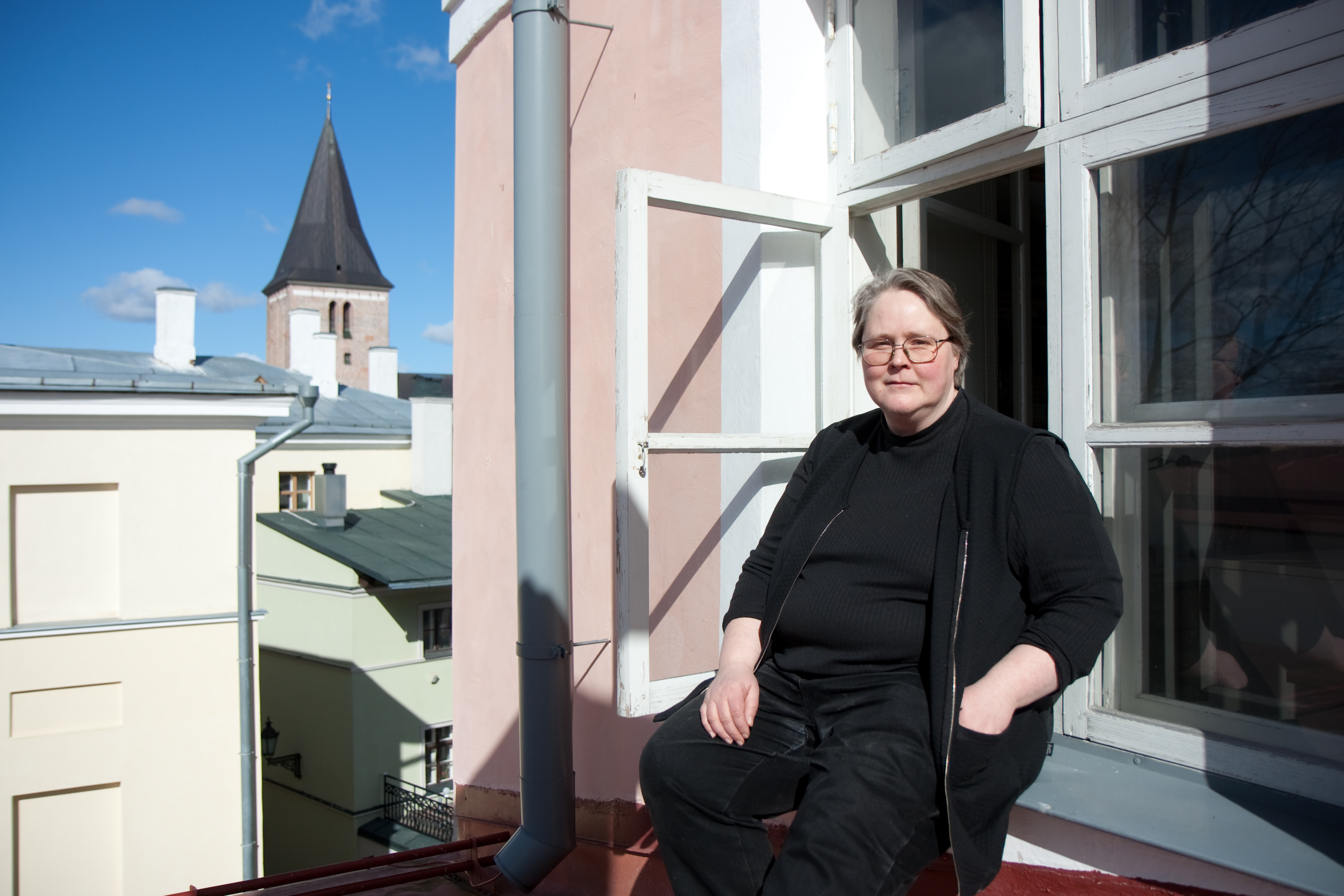
- Marju Lepajõe on Tartu University roof
- Born: 28 October 1962; Tartu, Estonia
- Died: 4 July 2019 (aged 56); Tartu, Estonia
- Occupations: Philologist; Theologian
- Employer: University of Tartu

Marju Lepajõe (28 October 1962 - 4 July 2019) was an Estonian classical philologist, translator and historian of religion.

== Early life and education ==
Lepajõe was born on 28 October 1962 to the scientists Jaan Lepajõe (et) (an expert in cereal production) and Leida Lepajõe (et) (an expert in chicken and egg production). She had two brothers and a sister; her brother Madis Lepajõe (et) became Deputy Mayor of Tartu in 2018.

Lepajõe graduated from the Department of Philology at the University of Tartu in 1982. Between 1988-91, she studied classical philology at Leningrad State University. In 1996, Lepajõe defended her master's degree in classical philology at the University of Tartu, her research project was entitled: The Fictitious Element in the Dares Phrygian Trojan Chronicle and Its Links to Contemporary Historiography. In 2018, Lepajõe defended her doctoral dissertation, which was entitled: Pastors and Literary Culture: Variations of Christian Humanism in Estonia and Livonia in the First Half of the 17th Century. She was awarded a Doctor of Philosophy degree as a result.

== Career ==
Between 1985-8 Lepajõe was Senior Librarian, Department of Manuscripts and Rare Books at the University of Tartu Library. This was the start of a long academic career there:

- 1992-3 - Assistant chair of classical philology
- 1993-8 - Latin and Greek lecturer, Department of Theology
- 1998 - Researcher in Church history
- 1998-2001 - Chair of historical theology and Latin

Lepajõe's research interests included the influence of neo-Platonic philosophy and patristic theology on later Christian thought, as well as theology in Estonian intellectual culture in the seventeenth century. Her research publications included articles on: demonology in Plotinus, Reiner Brockmann - the first poet writing in Estonian, the Estonian syrologist Arthur Võõbus, as well as including many other areas. She was a visiting researcher at universities such as: Freiburg, Göttingen, Oslo and London.

== Selected works ==
=== Translator ===
Lepajõe compiled the Greek-Estonian New Testament Dictionary. She was also a prolific translator, working on texts from ancient, medieval and modern authors, including: Plato, Plotinos, Gregory of Tours, Innocent III, Johannes Scotus Eriugena, Bernard of Clairvaux, Anselm of Canterbury, Thomas Aquinas, Descartes, Martin Luther, Johannes Risingh, Heinrich von Kleist, Otto Wilhelm Masing.

=== Translations ===
- "Fathers: Talmudic Part 4, Treatise 9". Tallinn: Periodicals, 1990 (Creative Library 6/1990) (translation from Hebrew, with Andres Gross)
- Carl Morgenstern . "On the Purpose and Subject of a Book Called Plato's Politeia". Academy 1/1993
- Plotinos . "On Beauty" Enneaadid I. 6. Academy 5/1993
- Plotinos. "Spiritual Beauty" (Enneaades V. 8). Academy 5/1993
- A. Hilary Armstrong . "The Teaching of Plotinus." Academy 5/1993
- Werner Beierwaltes . "Love of Beauty and Love of God". Academy 6/1993
- Christoph Wrembek . "The Star of Bethlehem: November 13, 1993 - 2000 years ago" (translation with Mari Tarvas). Academy 11/1993
- Heinrich von Kleist Marionette Theater by Heinrich von Kleist . Academy, 12/1993, pp. 2551–2557. Reprint: "In memoriam Claus Sommerhage". Tartu: Tartu University Press, 2005, pp. 138–144
- Hans Urs von Balthasar . "The Boundaries of Christian Mystery". Academy, 9/1994
- Endre von Ivánka . "From Names to Unnamed". Academy, 10/1994
- Pseudo-Dionysios Areopagita. "From Mystical Theology to Timotheos". Academy, 10/1994
- René Descartes. "Meditations on the First Philosophy" (II and VI). Academy, 8/1996
- Johannes Claudii Risingh, "A Call from the City of Tartu: 1637". Tartu: Tartu University Press, 1996 (translation from Latin; new edition Tartu: Ilmamaa, 2009)
- Plato "Politeia: Book VII 514a-621b". Academy 9/1997, pp. 1819–1828
- Jan Szaif, "Plato's Cave Equivalence ". Academy 9/1997, pp. 1829–1842
- Simone Weil, "" Ilias "or a poem about power". French tlk. Marju Lepajõe. Rainbow 7-8 / 1997, pp. 82–105
- Alexander Zaitsev, "Is a New Renaissance Possible," Tuna, 2/2001, pp. 4–9
- The Nature and Structure of Gnosis by Kurt Rudolph. Translated from German by Marju Lepajõe. Academy, 10/2001, pp. 2125–2140
- Plato, "Works of I. Socrates Apology. Phaidon. Kriton. Dinner. Charmides. Phaidros. Euthyphron." Tartu: Ilmamaa, 2003 (translation of the Ancient Greek dialogues "Phaidon" and "Phaidros")
- Eric R. Dodds, "Gentiles and Christians in an Age of Anxiety." Tallinn: Varrak, 2003 (English translation)
- Otto Wilhelm Masing "Welcome speech by OW Masing at the solemn reopening meeting of the University of Tartu, April 22, 1802". Translated from Latin by Marju Lepajõe. Rmt: "200 Years of University Studies in Estonian: 1803 Lectures in Estonian and Finnish at the University of Tartu: Anniversary Collection". Tartu, 2003. (Proceedings of the Chair of Estonian at the University of Tartu, 25). Pp. 10–13
- Plotinus "Entheads I.6: Beauty". Interpreter. and comment. Marju Lepajõe. Rmt: "An Anthology of Ancient Greek Literature". Tallinn, 2006. pp. 435–444
- Friedrich Robert Faehlmann, "Observations on Hidden Inflammations". Translated from Latin by Kaarina Rein and Marju Lepajõe. Rmt: Fr. "Works III" by R. Faehlmann. Estonian Literary Museum, Estonian Academy of Sciences Under and Tuglas Literature Center, 2011. pp. 90–152
- Martin Luther, "From the Prison of the Church of Babel: Foreplay". Translated from Latin by Marju Lepajõe. Rmt: Martin Luther "Selected Jobs". Tartu, 2012. pp. 177–298
- John Scotus Eriugena, "On the Nature of God: Periphyseon, II, 28". Academy, 12/2012, pp. 2115–2130
- Hieronymus, "The Life of the Blessed Paul, Thebes Monk: The Monk Romance" . Translated from Latin and commented by Marju Lepajõe. Rainbow, 1-2 / 2013, pp. 42–51
- From Gregorius Tours "Ten History Books: Excerpts". Translated by Tiina Kala, Marju Lepajõe. Rmt: "Anthology of Medieval Literature I. Latin Literature". Tallinn, 2013, pp. 104–113 (excerpts from books II, VII and IX)
- Anselm Canterbury's "Proslogion, or Talk: an excerpt." Translator and author Marju Lepajõe. Rmt: "Anthology of Medieval Literature I. Latin Literature". Tallinn, 2013. pp. 252–259
- Pierre Abélard, Héloïse (?) "Letters of Two Lovers: Excerpts". Translated by Marju Lepajõe. Rmt: "Anthology of Medieval Literature I. Latin Literature". Tallinn, 2013. pp. 287–292
- Bernard of Clairvaux, "Speeches on Song of Songs: Snippets". Translated by Marju Lepajõe. Rmt: "Anthology of Medieval Literature I. Latin Literature". Tallinn, 2013. pp. 331–347
- Innocentius III, Human Affliction: The Extract. Translator and author Marju Lepajõe. Rmt: "Anthology of Medieval Literature I. Latin Literature". Tallinn, 2013. pp. 463–485
- Kurt Rudolph, "Gnosis: The Nature and History of a Late Antique Religion." Translated by Jaan Lahe, Jana Lahe and Marju Lepajõe (translated from German), foreword by Jaan Lahe. Tallinn: Tallinn University Press, 2014
- Innocentius III, Human Misery: Part Two. Translated from Latin and commented by Marju Lepajõe. Rainbow, 1-2 / 2016, pp. 87–105

== Awards and honors ==
Lepajõe received many awards during her career, which include:

- 1995 Second Prize of the Open Society Fund for English in Social Sciences and Humanities
- 1999 Presidential Award of the Republic of Estonia
- 1999 Rector-von-Ewers-Preis from the University of Münster
- 1999 University of Tartu Raefond Prize for translating 17th century publications
- 2009 Language and Literature Annual Award for Best Article
- 2010 Cultural Endowment Literature Endowment Article Award (2009)
- 2015 Order of the White Star, V Class
- 2016 Estonian Culture Capital Scholarship " Life and Shine "
- 2017 Cross of Merit of the Estonian Evangelical Lutheran Church, 3rd degree
- 2017 Academy Award for the best article in the field of socialia
- 2018 Enn Soosaar Ethical Essay Prize

== Legacy ==
In 2018, Lepajõe was the subject of a documentary by writer and director Vallo Toomla, entitled "Marju Lepajõe: Words of the Day". The film was funded by the Estonian Film Institute and premiered on 27 September 2019.

In 2019, Lepajõe's family, the Postimees newspaper and University of Tartu established the Marju Lepajõe Memorial Fund. This fund aims to recognize and value research and translation. In September 2019 the fund announced its first scholarship competition.
