= Beiträge zur genauern Kenntniß der ehstnischen Sprache =

First scientific journal on Estonian language

Beiträge zur genauern Kenntniß der ehstnischen Sprache, commonly referred to as Beiträge, was the first scientific journal on Estonian language, edited by Johann Heinrich Rosenplänter and published in 1813–1832.

The text has become public domain. Electronic images of the original publication are available at EEVA.
