= Velta Ruke-Dravina =

Latvian-born Swedish linguist, folklorist, professor

- Born: Velta Tatjana Ruke; 25 January 1917; Valmiera, Russian Empire
- Died: 7 May 2003 (aged 86)

Academic background
- Education: University of Latvia; Stockholm University (PhD)
- Thesis: Diminutive im Lettischen (1959)

Academic work
- Discipline: Linguist; Folklorist
- Institutions: University of Lund; Stockholm University

Velta Ruke-Dravina (Velta Rūķe-Draviņa; 25 January 1917 – 7 May 2003) was a Latvian-born Swedish linguist and folklorist, as well as a professor in Baltic languages at Stockholm University. Ruke-Dravina's research interests included children's language, language contact, and dialectology. Her doctoral thesis was about diminutives in Latvian. She held the only professorship in Baltic languages outside the Baltics and had a leading role in developing the teaching program on the subject at Stockholm University. In 1980, she was elected as a member of the Royal Swedish Academy of Letters, History and Antiquities.

== Biography ==
Velta Tatjana Ruke was born on 25 January 1917 in Valmiera. She grew up in Latvia, graduating from Riga Secondary School No 2, and from the Department of Baltic Philology at the Faculty of Philology and Philosophy of the University of Latvia in 1939.

From 1938 and during World War II, Ruke-Dravina pursued doctoral studies in comparative Indo-European language research, but was not allowed to complete the studies as public defense of a thesis in this subject was not allowed in the German-fortified Latvia. She worked for a while as a lecturer in phonetics and served as an assistant to the linguist Jānis Endzelīns. She was involved in a number of projects associated with land-targeting and place-name research at the Latvian language archive.

In the autumn of 1944, Ruke-Dravina and her husband, like many others, fled to Sweden. She continued her academic activities, initially at Lund University, where she taught in Baltic languages in the 1950s, and later at Stockholm University, where she earned a licentiate degree in Slavic languages in 1954, and defended her doctorate in 1959 (Diminutive im Lettischen).

Between 1948 and 1970, Ruke-Dravina worked as a lecturer at the University of Lund, where she was an associate professor in Baltic and Slavic languages. Later, she continued her career at the Stockholm University, first as an associate professor in Slavic languages, then as an assistant professor of general linguistics, and finally as a regular professor in Baltic languages. She became the chair of the Department of Baltic Language and Literature at the Institute of Slavs and Balts at the Stockholm University before 1984. She was also a guest lecturer at universities in different countries. After retiring in 1983, Helge Rinholm became her successor.

From 1982 to 1990, Ruke-Dravina was an editor of the literary yearbook Zari. She published over 300 scientific articles, and was the author of several books on linguistic issues. She received several awards and prizes for her activities.

Ruke-Dravina is the mother of astronomer Dainis Dravins. She died on 7 May 2003.

== Selected works ==
- Latviešu valodas dialektoloģijas atlanta materialu vākšanas programa, 1954
- Laute und Nominalformen der Mundart von Stenden. 1, Einleitung, Akzent und Intonation, Lautlehre, 1955
- Verbalformen und undeklinierbare Redeteile der Mundart von Stenden : Verben, Adverbien, Präpositionen und Präfixe, Partikeln, Konjunktionen, 1958
- Diminutive im Lettischen, 1959
- Interjektionen und Onomatopöie in der Mundart von Stenden , 1962
- Zur Sprachentwicklung bei Kleinkindern. 1, Syntax : Beitrag auf der Grundlage lettischen Sprachmateriels, 1963
- Rainis kā augšzemnieku valodas pārstāvis, 1965
- Mehrsprachigkeit im Vorschulalter, 1967
- Språk i kontakt., 1969
- Initial consonant combinations in Lithuanian and Latvian , 1970
- Place names in Kauguri county, Latvia : a synchronic-structural analysis of toponyms in an ancient Indo-European and Finno-Ugric contact area., 1971
- Vārds īstā vietā : frazeologismu krājums = The right word in the right place, 1974
- The standardization process in Latvian 16. century to the present, 1977
- Jān̨i latviešu literatūrā , 1978
- No pieciem mēnešiem līdz pieciem gadiem, 1982
- Cilvēks un daba latviešu tautasdziesmās, 1986
- Rakstnieks un valoda, 1988
- Svenska ortnamn i lettisk skönlitteratur, 1989
- Valodniecība, 1991
- Jāni latviešu literatūrā, 1991
- Valodas jautājumi : rakstu krājums, 1992
- Latviešu meitene apgūst savu pirmo valodu, 1993
- Latviešu tautasdziesmu varianti : Kr. Barona "Latvju dainās", 1993
- Darbu izlase, 2017
