= Cornelius Hasselblatt =

German philologist, Estophile

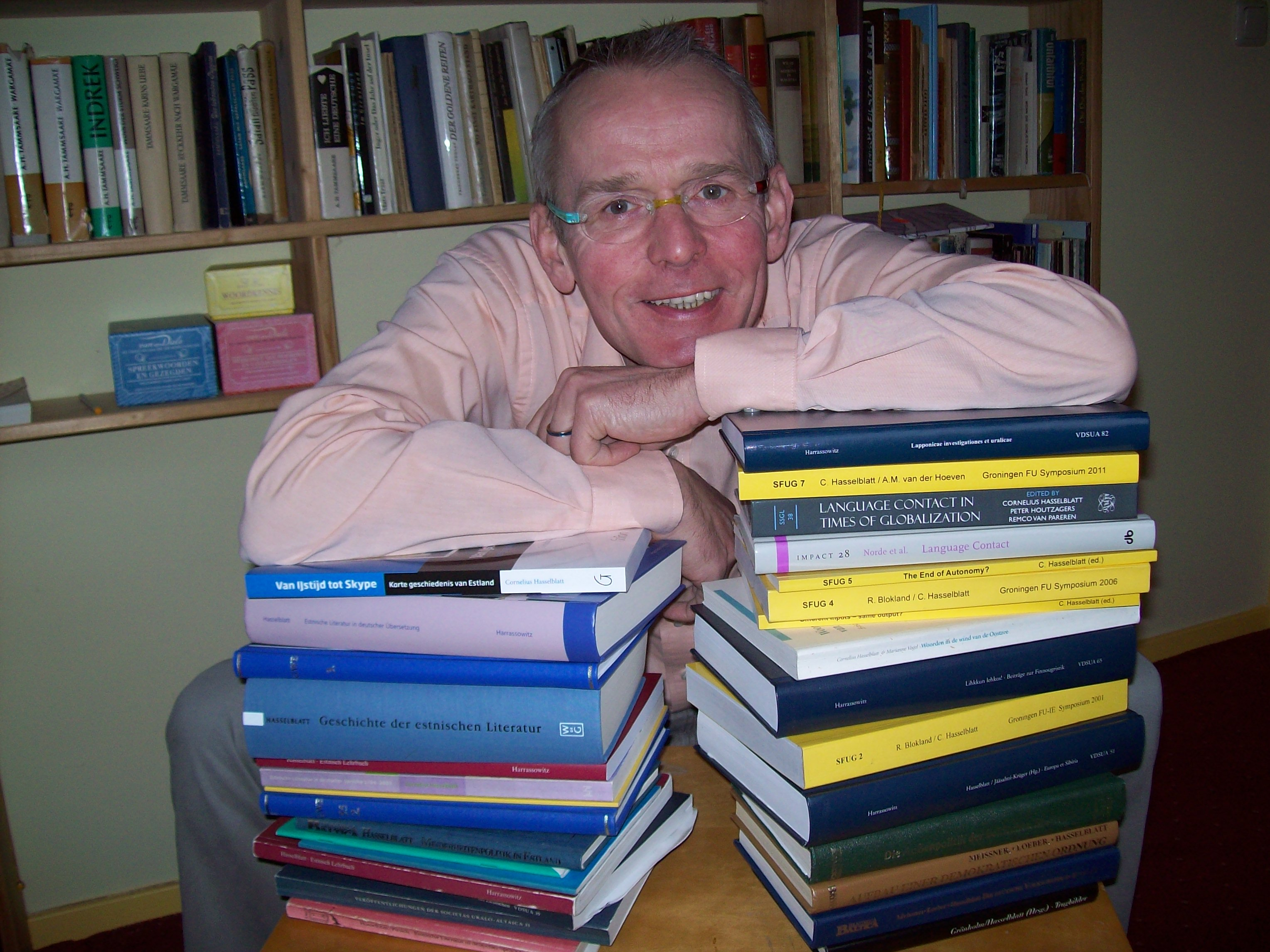
Cornelius Hasselblatt

Cornelius Theodor Hasselblatt (born 1960) is a German Finno-Ugric specialist, translator and Estophile. He lives in the Netherlands.

From 1980 to 1986 he studied Finno-Ugric languages and culture in Hamburg and Helsinki. In 1990 he defended his doctoral thesis.

From 1998 to 2014 he was a professor of Finno-Ugric languages and culture at Groningen University.

He is a foreign member of the Estonian Academy of Sciences.

== Works ==
Translations

- Andrus Kivirähk, "Frösche küssen" ('A Frog Kiss'). Willegoos 2015
- Andrus Kivirähk, "Der Schiet und das Frühjahr" ('Poo and Spring'). Willegoos 2015
