= Liepas Air Base =

Air base in Latvia

- IATA: none; ICAO: none

Summary
- Airport type: Military
- Operator: Latvian Air Force
- Location: Valmiera, Latvia
- Elevation AMSL: 256 ft / 78 m
- Coordinates: 57°23′12″N 025°30′30″E
- Interactive map of Liepas Air Base

Runways
Direction	Length		Surface
Direction	m	ft	Surface
17/35	2,200	7,218	grass

Liepas was an air base located 17 km (11 mi) south of Valmiera, a city in Latvia. It was a Soviet attack deployment base during the Cold War.
