= Valmiera Castle =

Castle in Latvia

- Vidzeme, Latvia
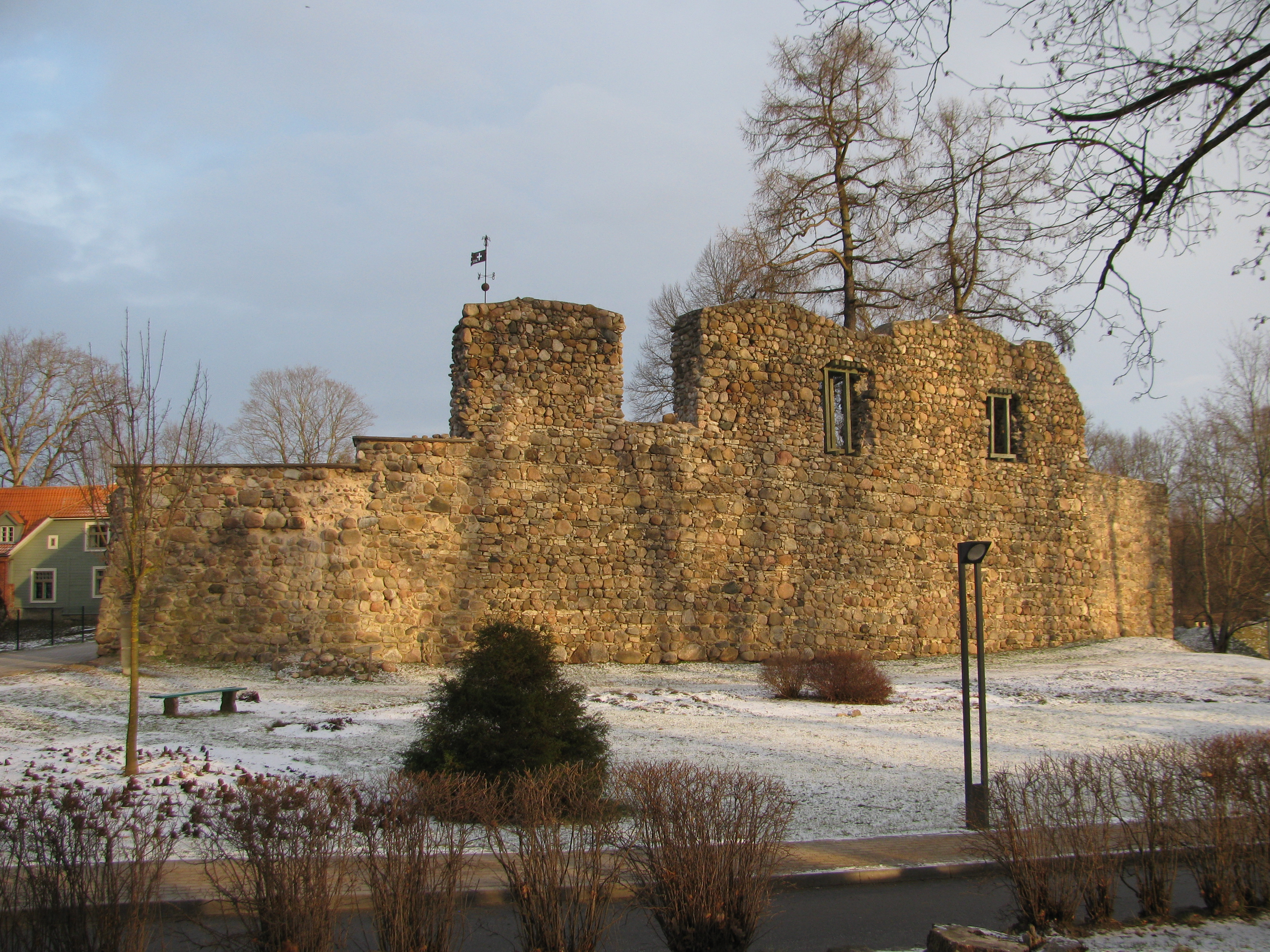
- Ruins of Valmiera Castle

Site information
- Type: Castle
- Condition: Ruins

Location
- Coordinates: 57°32′20″N 25°25′42″E

Site history
- Built: 13th century
- Built by: Livonian Order
- Materials: boulders, brick
- Demolished: 1702

Valmiera Castle (Latvian: Valmieras pils, German: Schloß Wolmar) was a castle in Valmiera, in the Vidzeme region of Latvia. Today its ruins lie in the city centre.

== History ==
The medieval castle was built on the site of an old Latgalian fortification during the 13th century by the Livonian Order as an Ordensburg. It protected the right bank of the river Gauja. The castle had a certain political importance since it hosted Landtags (i.e. assemblies of representatives) of the Livonian Confederation. The fortress was burnt down by Russian troops during the Great Northern War in 1702 and was subsequently used as a quarry for local residents to collect building materials.

The former castle grounds today contain a museum and a shop and is used as an open-air venue for concerts and celebrations.
