= Johann Heinrich Rosenplänter =

Baltic German linguist and Estophile

Johann Heinrich Rosenplänter (12 July/23 July 1782 in Valmiera – 15 April/27 April 1846 in Pärnu) was a Baltic German linguist and Estophile. He edited one of the first scientific journals on the Estonian language, Beiträge zur genauern Kenntniß der ehstnischen Sprache (commonly referred to as Beiträge...).

== Early life ==
Rosenplänter was born in Valmiera (then Wolmar), Livonia, in the Russian Empire, the son of a postmaster. He was educated by private tutors and attended the Tallinn Gymnasium for approximately one year, as well as the Riga Dome school for a similar period. He lost his parents early in life and was forced to begin working while still young. His engagement with Estonian language and culture was shaped by the intellectual currents of Romanticism and Rationalism, particularly the ideas of Johann Gottfried Herder.
