= Estophilia =

Strong interest in or love of Estonian people, culture, and history

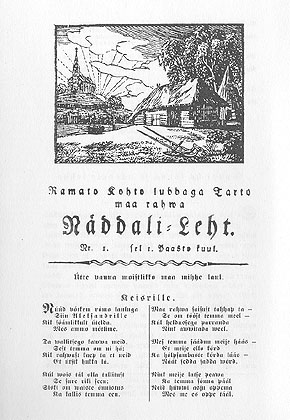
Tartu maa rahwa Näddali-Leht (Estonian for "Tartu-land People's Weekly") was one of the first regular Estonian language publications, published in 1807

Estophilia (from Greek: φίλος, filos - "dear, loving") refers to the ideas and activities of people not of Estonian descent who are sympathetic (Note: The opposite of 'Estophilia', is an anti-Estonian sentiment, or 'Estophobia') to, or interested in, Estonian language, Estonian literature or Estonian culture, the history of Estonia, and Estonia in general. Such people are known as Estophiles.

The term particularly refers to the activities of the Estophile Movement of the late 18th to early 19th century, when local Baltic German scholars began documenting and promoting Estonian culture and language. This movement played a crucial role in triggering the Estonian Age of Awakening in the 1850s, which eventually led to the Estonian Declaration of Independence and the foundation of the Republic of Estonia, as an independent democratic nation, in 1918.

== Background ==
Since the 13th century Northern Crusades, the use of Estonian language had been gradually suppressed in the local society, as the Middle Low German, and later High German, became the increasingly dominant language in the cities, in organised trade (Hanseatic league) and among wealthy rural landowners. Indigenous Estonian language was largely restricted to the everyday life of non-noble urban population and the farmers in the countryside. Native Estonians who became citizens or landlords tended to linguistically Germanise voluntarily, however this process did not destroy the evolution of the Estonian culture. Moreover, in the 18th century, many of the local educated and wealthy German-speakers took interest in, and began learning about, the Estonian language and culture, and in the process, contributing to the systematic understanding of it.

The Enlightenment era brought greater tolerance and a desire to educate those without access to education. For example, the very first Estonian language periodical publication, Lühhike öppetus (Estonian for Brief Instruction) (1766–1767), concerned medical techniques.

== History ==
=== Estophile Enlightenment Period (1750–1840) ===
Educated German immigrants and local Baltic Germans in Estonia, educated at German universities introduced Enlightenment ideas that propagated freedom of thinking and brotherhood and equality. The French Revolution provided a powerful motive for the "enlightened" local upper class to create literature for the peasantry. The abolition of serfdom in 1816 in Southern Estonia: Governorate of Livonia and 1819 in Northern Estonia: Governorate of Estonia by Emperor Alexander I of Russia gave rise to a debate as to the future fate of the rural population. Although many Baltic Germans regarded the future of Estonians as being a fusion with the Baltic Germans, the Estophile educated class admired the ancient culture of the Estonians and their era of freedom before the conquests by Danes and Germans in the 13th century. The Estophile Enlightenment Period formed the transition from religious Estonian literature to newspapers printed in Estonian for the general public.

The ideas of Johann Gottfried Herder greatly influenced the Baltic German intelligentsia to see the value in the indigenous Estonian culture. Inspired by Herder's collection of European and Estonian folk songs, they came to view native folklore as natural expressions of truth and spontaneity. As a result, they founded several scientific societies, published textbooks for schools, newspapers and literary works of considerable merit, such as the construction of the epic Kalevipoeg from folk sources.

Otto Wilhelm Masing and Garlieb Merkel were prominent Estophiles. Masing was one of the main advocates of popular education and published a weekly newspaper in the Estonian language called "Marahwa Näddala-Leht" (Land People's Weekly) in 1821–1825. The Litterarum Societatis Esthonicae (Estonian: Õpetatud Eesti Selts) (English: Learned Estonian Society) was established in Tartu in 1838, which counted as its members Friedrich Robert Faehlmann and Friedrich Reinhold Kreutzwald, author of the Estonian national epic Kalevipoeg which was inspired by the Finnish epic Kalevala.

=== Folklore recording ===
Folklore being a relatively easily identifiable collectible, a number of Estophiles have undertaken recording various folktales and folk songs. On one hand, this led to development of Estonian literary tradition; on another, growing amounts of written Estonian language texts necessitated development of (relatively) unified rules of orthography, and thus, led to analysis of Estonian grammar and phonetics.

=== Linguistic analyses ===
An Estonian grammar was printed in German in 1637. Johann Heinrich Rosenplänter published the first academic journal in 1813 on an Estonian topic called Beiträge zur genauern Kenntniß der ehstnischen Sprache (Towards a more precise Knowledge of the Estonian Language), aimed at developing written Estonian. In 1843, a grammar of the Estonian language was compiled by pastor Eduard Ahrens using the Finnish and popular orthography rather than the German-Latin models used previously.

== Modern Estophiles ==
While the significance of Estophiles has waned over the centuries, a number of people (Astrīde Ivaska, Cornelius Hasselblatt, Seppo Kuusisto, Kazuto Matsumura and others) are still widely regarded as such. Since World War II, many of the Estophiles around the world have been in close connection with various Estonian exile communities. One of the most active Estophile organizations is the Tuglas Society (Finnish: Tuglas-seura) in Finland, named after the Estonian writer Friedebert Tuglas.

== Scholarship Estophilus ==
In order to promote the study of Estonian language and culture, the Estonian Institute offers an annual scholarship. The objective of the scholarship is to fund research and studies conducted in Estonia by academically advanced students interested in Estonian language and culture. The scholarship is financed by the Estonian Ministry of Education and Research.

== See also ==
- Anglophile
- Fennophile
- Francophile
- Russophile
