= Tartu University Library =

Library in Tartu, Estonia

Coordinates: 58.3767°N 26.7206°E

Tartu University Library (Estonian: Tartu Ülikooli raamatukogu) is an academic library in Tartu, Estonia, belonging to the University of Tartu. It is the largest academic library in the country.

The library was founded in 1802 as part of the Imperial University of Dorpat (with its forerunner from 1632). Holdings include approximately 3.7 million volumes. The collection is particularly rich in the field of semiotics.

The main building of the library is situated in the center of Tartu, on Struve Street 1.

Its holdings include memorial collections of Karl Ernst von Baer, Thomas Sebeok and many others.

From 1985 to 1988 Marju Lepajõe was Senior Librarian, Department of Manuscripts and Rare Books there.

== See also ==
- EEVA
