= EEVA =

Digital text repository for older Estonian literature

EEVA, Eesti vanema kirjanduse digitaalne tekstikogu (Estonian for 'Digital Text Repository for Older Estonian Literature'), is a project of the University of Tartu Library, Department of Literature and Folklore of the University of Tartu and Estonian Literary Museum to digitise old texts that are important to Estonian literature history, thus allowing wide readership to access them while sparing the (almost invariably rare) originals.
