= Valmiera Drama Theatre =

Theatre in Valmiera, Latvia

Coordinates: 57.5394°N 25.4261°E

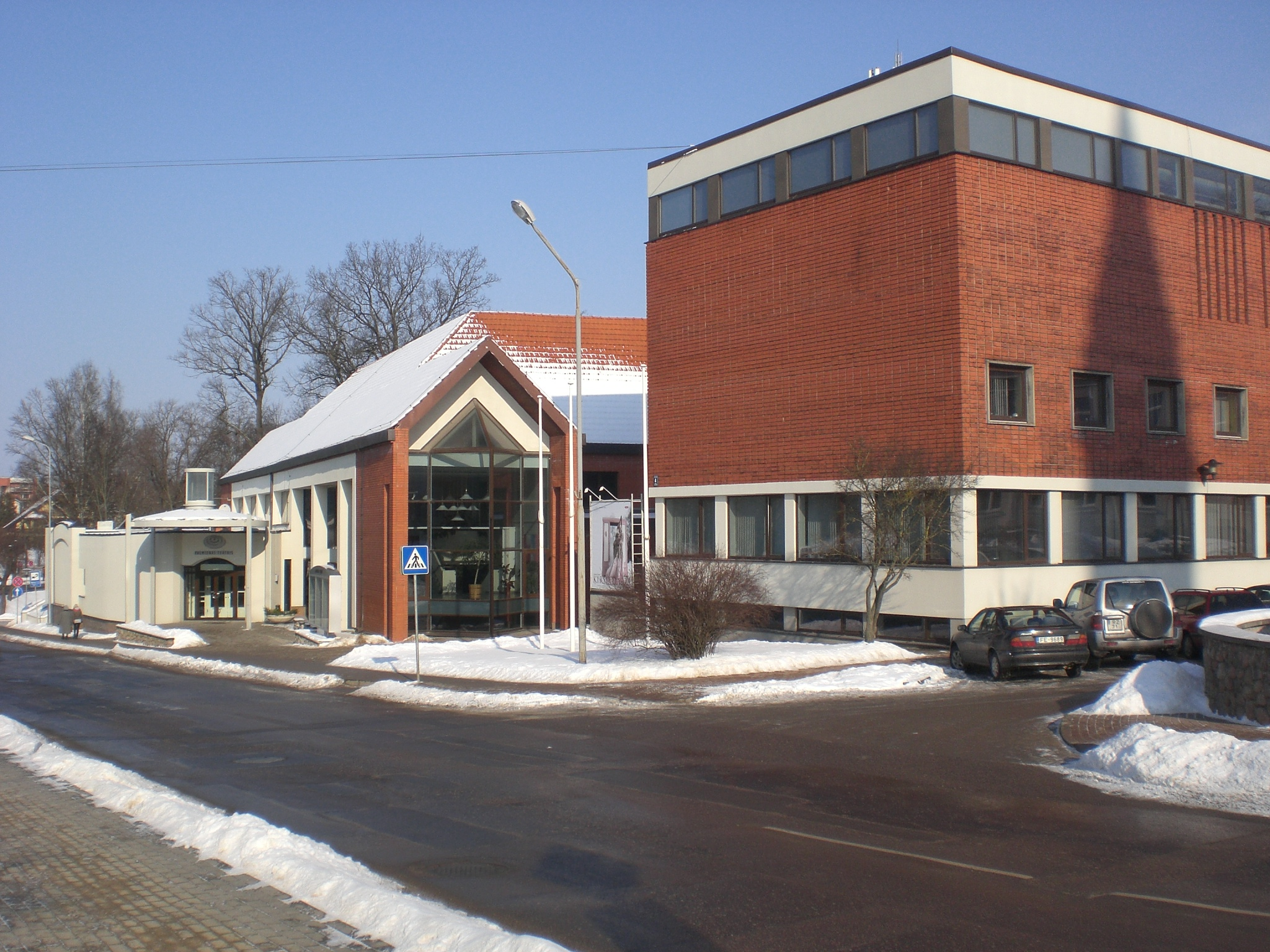
Valmiera Drama Theatre (2009)

Valmiera Drama Theatre (Latvian: Valmieras Drāmas teātris) is a theatre in Valmiera, Latvia. It was established in 1919 and renovated in 2024. Asja Lācis was director from 1950 to 1957.

== Description ==
Valmiera Theater is situated in the center of Valmiera, next to the Dzirnavu Lake Promenade. Following the remodeling, the theater relocated to the refurbished homes on Lāčplėša Street 4 on 16 July 2024. This location has three sections: the Great, the Round, and the New Hall.

== History ==
=== Pre-history ===
The beginnings of the theatre can be considered to date back to 1818, when in Dikļi the first performance was staged in the Latvian language in the manor barn – Friedrich Schiller’s The Robbers.

=== Founding ===
The Valmiera Drama Theater was founded in 1923, when, with the support of the Valmiera City Council, professional theater performances began to be held regularly. In 1930, it was nenamed as the Northern Latvia Theater.

=== Soviet and Nazi Occupations ===
During the Soviet occupation in 1940-1941, the Valmiera Workers' Union amateur theater was active, and during the Nazi German occupation, the Valmiera Theater was active. In 1943, Pēteris Lūcis staged his first production at the Valmiera Theater. In 1944, the Latvian SSR State Valmiera Drama Theater began operating under the direction of director Žanis Vīkalns with Rainis's play "Pūt, vējiņi!" (Blow, Winds!). In 1948, the State Latgale Drama Theater was added to the theater. From 1950, Anna Lāce (Lācis) was the theatre's chief director.

=== Since 1990 ===
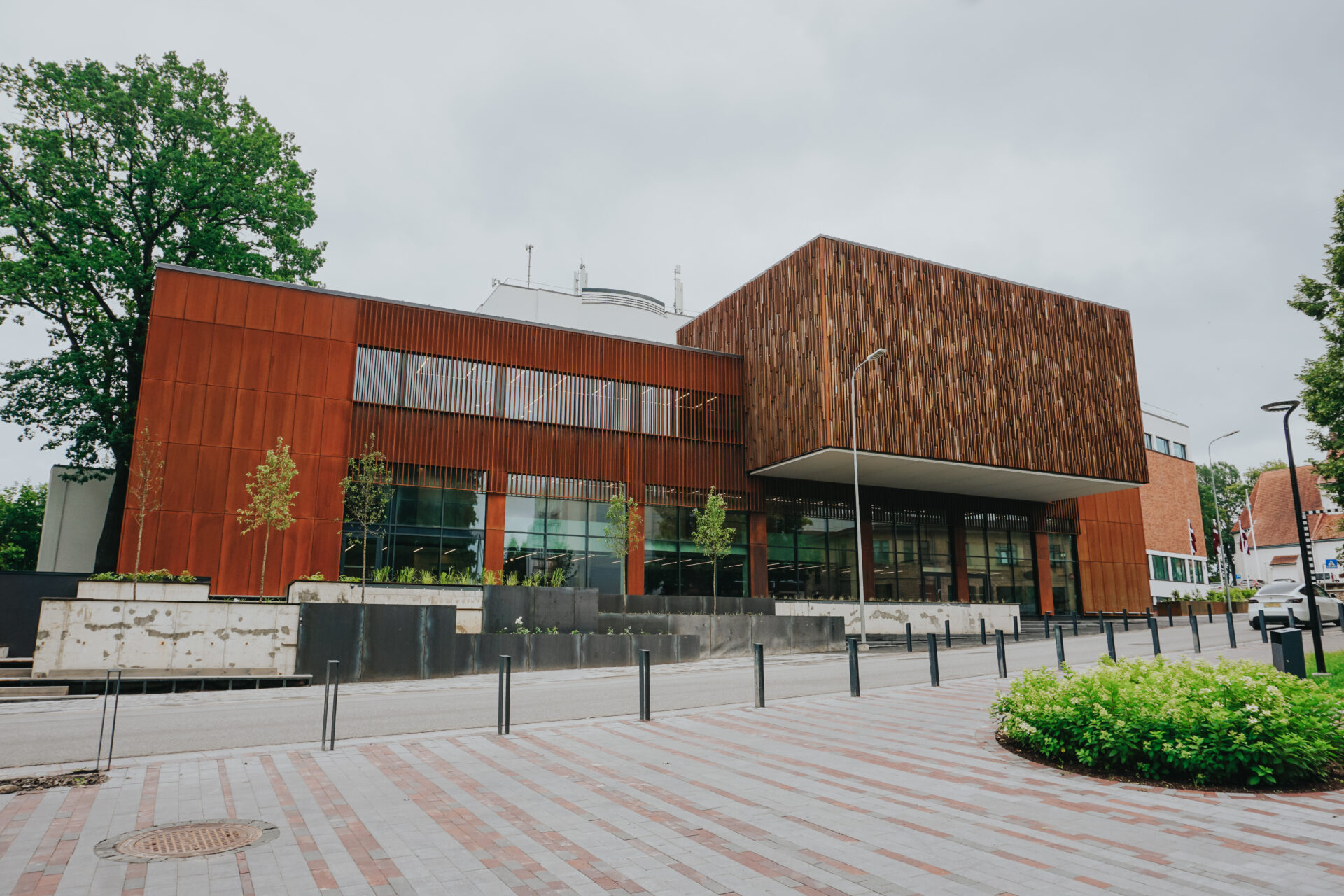
Valmiera Drama Theatre after renovation

The Valmiera Drama Theater building was constructed in 1996 according to a design by architects Modris Ģelzis, Olita Upaciere and Juris Gusevs on the site where the Latvian Society House once stood. This stone building has two halls, a theatre museum, an art salon and a café. The theatre building is also part of the Valmiera St. Simon's Church and medieval fortifications of Valmiera Castle area, which are architectural monuments of national importance.
