= Silvia Laidla =

Estonian actress

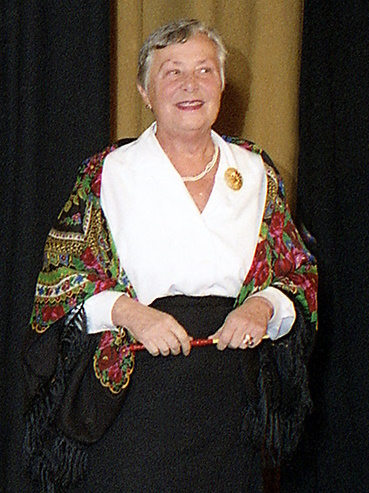
- Silvia Laidla at the Salong-Teater in Tallinn (1994)
- Born: Silvia Lazarus; 20 October 1927; Valga, Valga County, Estonia
- Died: 3 May 2012 (aged 84); Tallinn, Estonia
- Other names: Silvia Anniko; Silvia Lurje
- Occupation: Actress
- Years active: 1953–2012
- Spouse(s): Silver Anniko (divorced); Jakob Lurje (his death)

Silvia Laidla (born Silvia Lazarus; 20 October 1927 – 3 May 2012) was an Estonian stage, television and film actress whose career spanned nearly six decades. Primarily a stage actress, she also appeared in several Estonian television series and motion pictures.

== Early life and education ==
Born Silvia Lazarus in Valga in 1927 to Karl and Emilie Lazarus. She was youngest of two siblings, with an older brother. Her mother died when she was six. In 1935, the family changed their surname from Lazarus to Laidla. She attended schools in Valga and Türi, graduating from the Türi Secondary School in 1946. Following her graduation, she studied drama at the Estonian Studio of the Lutasharsky National Institute of Theatrical Arts (GITIS) in Moscow, graduating in 1953. Some of her graduating classmates included Estonian actors Ita Ever, Arvo Kruusement, Kaljo Kiisk and Jaanus Orgulas.

== Career ==
=== Stage ===
In 1953, Laidla returned to Estonia and began an engagement as an actress at the Estonian Drama Theatre in Tallinn. Her first role at the Estonian Drama Theatre was as Anna Fedorovna in a production of Maxim Gorky's 1905 play Barbarians. She would remain at the Estonian Drama Theatre for eleven years before joining the Estonian SSR State Youth Theatre (now, the Tallinn City Theatre) from 1966 until 1983. In 1983, Laidla again returned to the Estonian Drama Theatre, where she remained until 1992. During her later years, she became active in the Tallinn-based Salon Theatre, led by actor and stage director Dajan Ahmet.

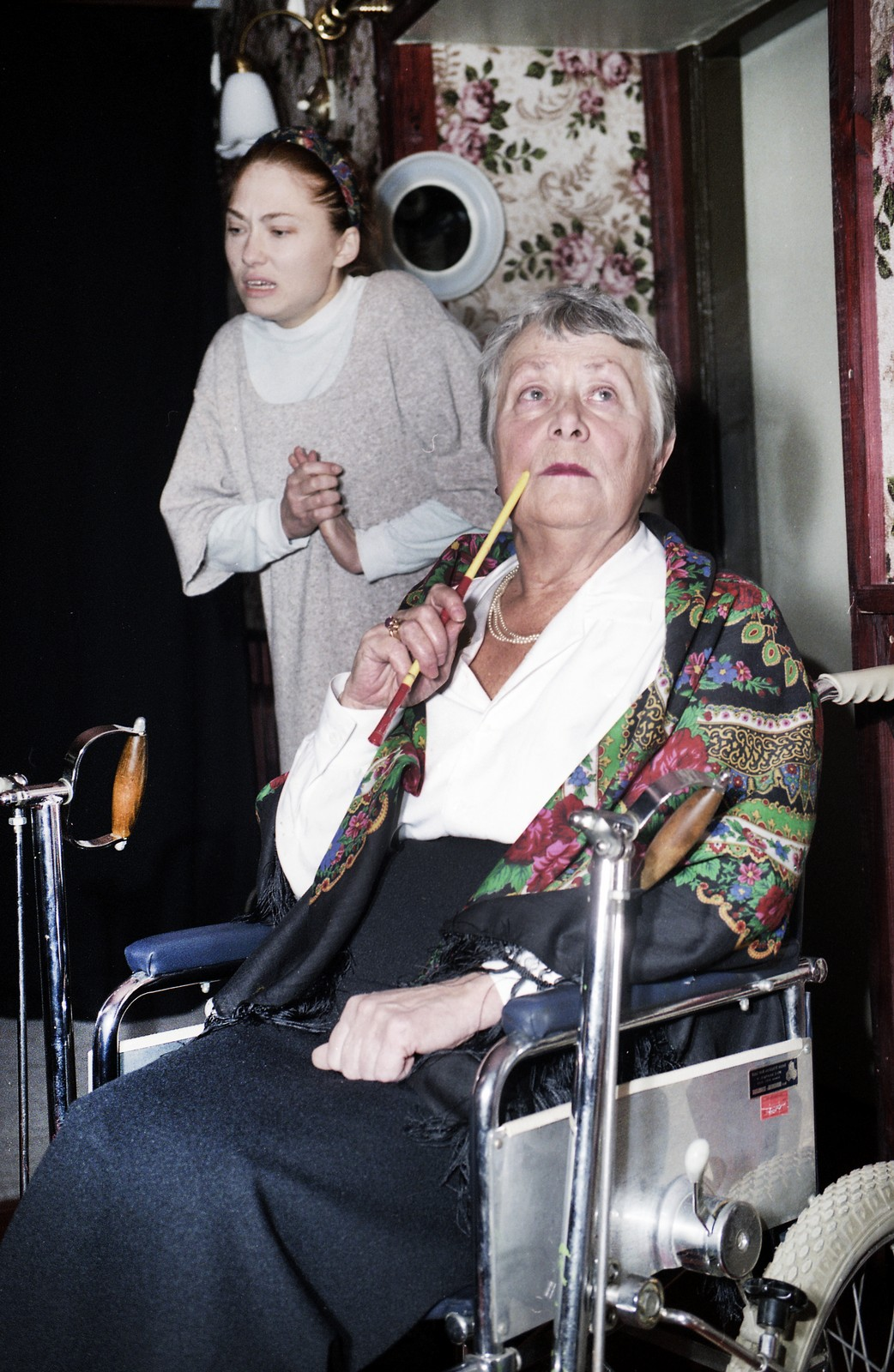
Laidla (front) performing with Carmen Mikiver in 1994 at the Salong-Teater

Some of Laidla's most memorable stage roles include those in productions by such varied international playwrights and authors as: Shakespeare, Alfred Gehri, Vladimir Mayakovsky, Friedrich Schiller, Bertholt Brecht, Henrik Ibsen, Molière, Aleksis Kivi, István Örkény, Arthur Miller, Jean Cocteau, George Bernard Shaw, Alexandre Dumas, fils, Ivan Turgenev, Marsha Norman, Albert Camus, Richard Rodgers and John Murrell, among others. Among her more memorable performances in roles by Estonian playwrights and authors include those of: August Kitzberg, Eduard Vilde, A. H. Tammsaare, Juhan Smuul, Merle Karusoo, August Gailit, Urmas Vadi, Heino Väli, and several others.

=== Television ===
Silvia Laidla made her television debut as a narrator in the Elvi Koppel directed 1965 documentary Kakskümmend lehekülge ("Twelve Pages") about Estonian schoolboy Harry Esop, who died in the Leningrad Blockade during World War II. This was followed by her first appearance as an actress in a television film, 1968's Tädi Rose ("Aunt Rose), directed by Virve Aruoja for Eesti Telefilm and based on the 1946 one-act play 27 Wagons Full of Cotton by Tennessee Williams. This was followed by a role in the 1970 Virve Aruoja directed historical television film Kolme katku vahel ("Between Three Plagues"), based on the 1970 novel of the same name by Estonian author Jaan Kross and starring actor and singer Georg Ots as the 16-century chronicler Balthasar Russow. In 1987, Laidla appeared as Aliide Kask in the Ivo Eensalu directed Eesti Televisioon (ETV) television film Džuudopoisid, based on the 1985 children's book by Janno Põldma of the same name.

Laidla is possibly best recalled by television viewers for her role as Erna Sumberg on the long-running ETV drama series Õnne 13. She joined the cast in 2001 and appeared on the series until her death in 2012.

=== Film ===
Silvia Laidla made her film debut in the 1969 Arvo Kruusement directed film adaptation of the 1912-1913 Oskar Luts penned novel Kevade ("Spring") as Köögi-Liisa. This was followed by the role of Viia in the 1971 drama Tuuline Rand ("Windy Beach"), directed by Kaljo Kiisk for Tallinfilm and based on the four-part novel penned by Aadu Hint of the same name. Laidla's next role was as Tereza in the Arvo Kruusement directed musical-comedy Don Juan Tallinnas, also released by Tallinnfilm in 1971.

In 1981, Laidla appeared in the Arvo Kruusement directed drama Karge meri, portraying the main character Katrina's (actress Merle Talvik) mother. Karge meri was based on the 1938 novel of the same name by author August Gailit. In 1992, she appeared in a small role in the Lembit Ulfsak directed family-comedy Lammas all paremas nurgas ("The Secret Lamb") for Tallinnfilm. In 1998, she made her last film appearance in the role of a director for the home for the elderly in the Rao Heidmets directed family-comedy film Kallis härra Q ("Dear Mister Moon"), released by Rao Heidmetsa Filmistuudio.

=== Voice ===
In addition to work on the stage and in film and television, Silvia Laidla has also appeared in a number of radio theatre plays. Among them include a 1955 radio production of Juhan Sütiste's 1945 play Ristikoerad and the role of Hatty Doran in a 1963 radio play production of The Adventure of the Noble Bachelor, one of the fifty-six short Sherlock Holmes stories written by British author Arthur Conan Doyle. In 2012, shortly before her death, she worked as a humorist for a Vikerraadio program, of the Eesti Rahvusringhääling (Estonian Public Broadcasting).

In 1975, Laidla, along with Estonian actresses Ita Ever and Lisl Lindau, recorded several spoken-word works of poetry by Estonian poet Marie Under. The recording was released under the title "Marie Under – Valik Luulet" (Marie Under – A Selection of Verse)."

== Personal life ==
Silvia Laida was married twice. Her first husband was writer and journalist Silver Anniko. The couple later divorced. Anniko and his second wife were later murdered in May 1982. The crime was never solved. Laidla's second husband was lawyer Jakob Lurje. The two were introduced by actress Laine Mesikäpp. Lurje and Laidla were married for nearly twenty years before his death in 1983. Laidla never remarried or had children. Laidla died at age 84 and was buried at Tallinn's Metsakalmistu (Forest Cemetery).

== Legacy ==
In 1974, Silvia Laidla was awarded the honorary title Merited Artist of the Estonian SSR. In 2003, she was awarded the Order of the White Star IV Class, by Estonian President Arnold Rüütel. In 2015, The Estonian Theater and Music Museum released a book written by Kirsten Simmo titled Sonettide sarmikas daam ("The Charming Lady of the Sonnets"), dedicated to the life and work of Laidla, published by SE&JS. The book, number eighteen, is part of a series of archival publications of individuals related to the field of entertainment in Estonia.
