= Professor Martens' Departure =

1984 novel by Jaan Kross

- Cover of 1994 published English version.
- Author: Jaan Kross
- Original title: Professor Martensi ärasõit
- Translator: Anselm Hollo
- Cover artist: Marjorie Anderson
- Language: Estonian
- Genre: Historical novel
- Publisher: Eesti Raamat
- Publication date: 1984
- Publication place: Estonia
- English publication date: 1994
- Media type: Print (Paperback)
- Pages: 247 pp
- Preceded by: The Czar's Madman (Estonian: Keisri hull, 1978)
- Followed by: Sailing Against the Wind (Estonian: Vastutuulelaev, 1987)

Professor Martens' Departure is a 1984 historical novel set in czarist Russia by Estonian writer Jaan Kross.

== Plot summary ==
Friedrich Fromhold Martens, born in Pärnu, Estonia on 27 August 1845, was a renowned expert in international law. He attended the University of St. Petersburg where he later became a professor. He was a polyglot, jurist, arbitrator, and a member of the Russian Ministry of Foreign Affairs. He represented the Russian Government at many international conferences including the Hague Peace Conference in 1899. He was a candidate for the Nobel Peace Prize in 1902 and was mistakenly reported by some as the winner.

During a train journey from his home town of Pärnu to St. Petersburg he recalls many events of his life. He remembers meeting his wife Kati for the first time at her father's house. He describes the discovery of his "double", Georg Friedrich Martens, a man who lived an almost parallel life to Friedrich eighty-nine years previously. Georg was born in Hamburg, Germany, attended the University of Göttingen and also became a professor of international law. Some of the recollected events, for example, the Great Flood of Hamburg in 1770 and a fire in a wooded suburb of Göttingen actually took place during Georg's life and not his own. He describes important events from his own life, including the arrest of his Estonian nationalist nephew, Johannes. He remembers his meeting with the Imperial Chancellor, Prince Alexander Mikhailovich Gorchakov, to discuss the publication of his compendium (the compendium itself being heavily influenced by Georg's works) of treaties between Russia and other nations. He formulates his theory of "comparativist psychology". With some embarrassment, he relates the story of his candidacy for the Nobel Peace Prize and the mistaken reports that he was the winner. He outlines his "doctrine of respect for human rights". He describes his affair with an art student, Yvette Arlon, a woman that later bore his child, married and fled to the Congo.

Friedrich discusses politics with a fellow train passenger, an Estonian lady and socialist, Hella Wuolijoki. He wonders how differently he would have lived his life if given another chance. He recalls the embarrassing episode of the Treaty of Portsmouth; Friedrich was a member of the Russian delegation, but his name was mistakenly omitted from the initial list of delegates, and so the Japanese did not allow him to participate in most of the talks. He remembers Mr. Saebelmann, the son of the man who was rumored to have ousted Friedrich's father from the parish clerk's cottage. Mr. Saebelmann became a composer of some note but later died in Poltava. At the end of the novel, he describes the death of his double, Georg, in Frankfurt am Main, and reassured himself that since his life has so closely paralleled Georg's, he cannot die for a couple of years yet. In the greatest deviation from the life of his double, however, Martens does end up dying at the train station in Valga.

Thought the novel, Martens returns time and time again to the idea of "candour" and "total candour". At the beginning, Martens is concerned with leaving the reader a positive impression of his life and achievements, but as he reveals more about himself throughout the novel, more unfavourable details come to light, and it becomes apparent that Martens had been touching up many of the earlier anecdotes. As he races toward death, Martens also runs toward a final confession. Although his confessions are addressed to his wife Kati, they are really for himself - he is finally admitting to himself that he is not quite the man he always made himself up to be.

== Characters ==
- Professor Friedrich Fromhold Martens - main character.
- Yekaterina Nikolayevna or Kati - wife of Friedrich.
- Nikolai Andreyevich - father of Kati and a senator of high social standing.
- Nicol Martens- son of Friedrich and Kati. Friedrich finds his son to be very unexceptional.
- Katarina - daughter of Friedrich and Kati.
- Edit - daughter of Friedrich and Kati.
- Heinrich Martens - brother of Friedrich and a shoemaker in Riga.
- August Martens - brother of Friedrich and a celebrated physician in Funchal, Madeira.
- Julius Martens - brother of Friedrich and a pharmacist.
- Johannes Martens - son of Heinrich, Estonian nationalist.
- Huik - the stationmaster at Pärnu.
- Kaarl - servant of Friedrich.
- Frieda - wife of Kaarl and servant of Friedrich.
- Mr. Vodovozov - contributor to the Brockhaus and Efron Encyclopedic Dictionary and former student of Friedrich.
- Ignati Yakinfovich or Ivan Ivanovich or Ivanovski - dean at the University of St. Petersburg.
- Mary Christiansen - a neighbor of Friedrich with whom he had an affair.
- Mr. Christiansen - manager of a provincial factory.
- Yvette Arlon - a Belgian art student with whom Friedrich had an affair and a son while on a work-related trip to Brussels.
- Frédéric Martens - the illegitimate son of Friedrich and Yvette. Frédéric has his father's last name because his mother married another man by the same surname.
- Sergei Witte - a Russian economic reformer.
- Roman Rosen - a Russian diplomat and Ambassador to the United States.
- Hella Wuolijoki (née Murrik) - an Estonian lady and socialist.
- Georg Friedrich von Martens - The German international legal expert, juror and author who serves as an inspiration to Friedrich Fromhold Martens; the man Freidrich Fromhold views as his double.
- Magdalena - wife of Georg.
- Mr. Saebelmann - a composer of Estonian music whose father replaced Friedrich's father at the parish clerk's cottage.
- Platon Lvovich - a friend of Friedrich from the university.
- Yokim Viktorovich - a friend of Friedrich from the university.
- Mr. Kapp - a distant relation of Friedrich.

== Setting ==
The action of the book takes place exclusively in Estonia, between the towns of Pärnu, Estonia and Valga, Estonia. Recollections, however, take place in Hamburg, Germany (from the life of Georg Freidrich); St. Petersburg, Russia (of Freidrich Fromhold's time in the University); Brussels, Belgium (of Freidrich Fromhold's affair with Yvette Arlon); and Portsmouth, New Hampshire, USA (of Freidrich Fromhold's experiences at the Treaty Portsmouth negotiations), as well as various other locations in Europe and Russia.

== Historical events referenced ==
- Treaty of Portsmouth
- Hague Conventions of 1899 and 1907 (Specifically, the convention of 1899)
- 1902 Nobel Peace Prize

== Critical reception ==
Critical reviews in English of this work and others by the same author has been limited due to the limited availability of works translated from the Estonian language into English, although every work of his has been reviewed in Estonian.

When this work has been reviewed, it has generally been to praise, such as in Richard B. Bilder and W. E. Butler's review in The American Journal of International Law: “To say, as a reviewer, that this is a recommended read would be a considerable understatement. It is more than simply a first-class novel, superbly translated; for the cognoscenti, the novel makes its own contribution to the history of international law. Jaan Kross graduated from the Law Faculty of Tartu University, and his historical fiction is noted for careful research and fidelity to actual events and personages."

The novel has also been reviewed in World Literature Today.
