= Piret Kalda =

Estonian actress (born 1966)

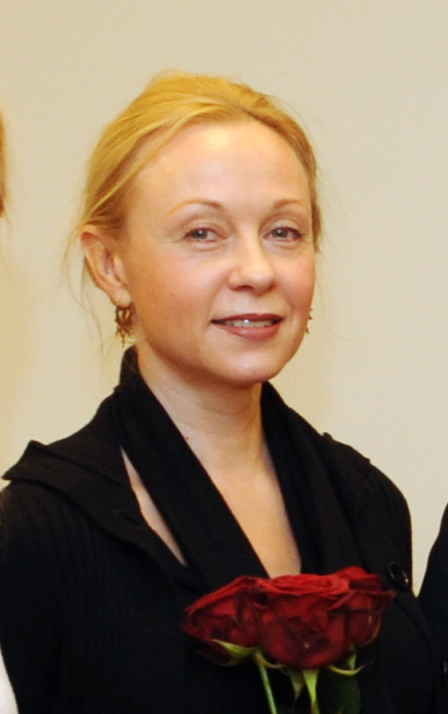
- Born: 4 February 1966 (age 60); Tartu, then part of Estonian SSR, Soviet Union
- Occupation: Actress
- Years active: 1988 – present
- Spouse: Priit Künnapas (1989 – 2013; his death)
- Children: 3

Piret Kalda (born 4 February 1966) is an Estonian stage, television and film actress.

== Early life and education ==
Piret Kalda was born and raised in Tartu. She was one of three siblings. She attended schools in Tartu, graduating from Tartu No. 5 secondary school (now, Tartu Tamme Gymnasium). Following her graduation from secondary school, she enrolled at the Tallinn State Conservatory's Dramatic Arts Department (now, the Estonian Academy of Music and Theatre) in Tallinn, studying acting, and graduating in 1988. Her diploma production roles included Laurey Williams, in Richard Rodgers' Oklahoma!; Bianca, in William Shakespeare's The Taming of the Shrew; and Irina, in Anton Chekhov's Three Sisters.

== Stage career ==
Following her graduation from the Tallinn Conservatory, Kalda became engaged as an actress at Tallinn's Youth Theatre (since 1994, the Tallinn City Theatre) in 1988, where she is still currently engaged. Her stage debut was in the role of Tiiu in a production of Hugo Raudsepp's Vedel vorst, directed by Mati Unt in 1989. Kalda has had a prolific career at the Tallinn City Theatre, appearing in more than forty roles in productions in works by a variety of authors and playwrights. Some of her more memorable roles at the Tallinn City Theatre include:

- Helene, in Friedebert Tuglas' Helene, Marion ja Felix (1990)
- Amelka, in Stanisław Ignacy Witkiewicz's Little Mansions (1990)
- Honey, in Edward Albee's Who's Afraid of Virginia Woolf? (1993)
- Shelly, in Sam Shepard's Buried Child (1994)
- Tekla, in August Strindberg's Creditors (1994)
- Constance, in Alexandre Dumas' The Three Musketeers (1995)
- Chloe Coverly, in Tom Stoppard's, Arcadia (1995)
- Lucy, in Bertolt Brecht's Threepenny Opera (1997)
- Julia, in Edward Albee's A Delicate Balance (1998)
- Marie Beaumarchais, in Johann Wolfgang von Goethe's Clavigo (2000)
- Avdotya (Evdoksia) Nikitishna Kukshina, in Ivan Turgenev's Fathers and Sons (2002)
- Kitty Itam, in A. H. Tammsaare's Karin. Indrek. Tõde ja õigus. 4. (2006)
- Signora Cini, in Luigi Pirandello's Right You Are (if you think so) (2006)
- Tirts, in Paula Vogel's How I Learned to Drive (2007)
- Adurey, in Dennis Potter's Blue Remembered Hills (2007)
- Hannah Jelkes, in Tennessee Williams's The Night of the Iguana (2008)
- Mrs. Biedermann, in Max Frisch's The Fire Raisers (2010)
- Varvara, and Bakunin woman, in Tom Stoppard's The Coast of Utopia (2013)
- Nurse Plimpton, in Anthony Horowitz's Mindgame (2014)
- Manilova, in Nikolai Gogol's Dead Souls (2014)
- Anna, in Madis Kõiv's The Return of the Father (2015)
- Maggie, in Michael Cristofer's The Shadow Box (2016)

Kalda has also appeared as an actress at a number of other theatres during her years as a stage actress, including the Kuressaare City Theatre, the Estonian Drama Theatre in Tallinn, the Monoteater, and the Ugala theatre in Viljandi.

== Film ==
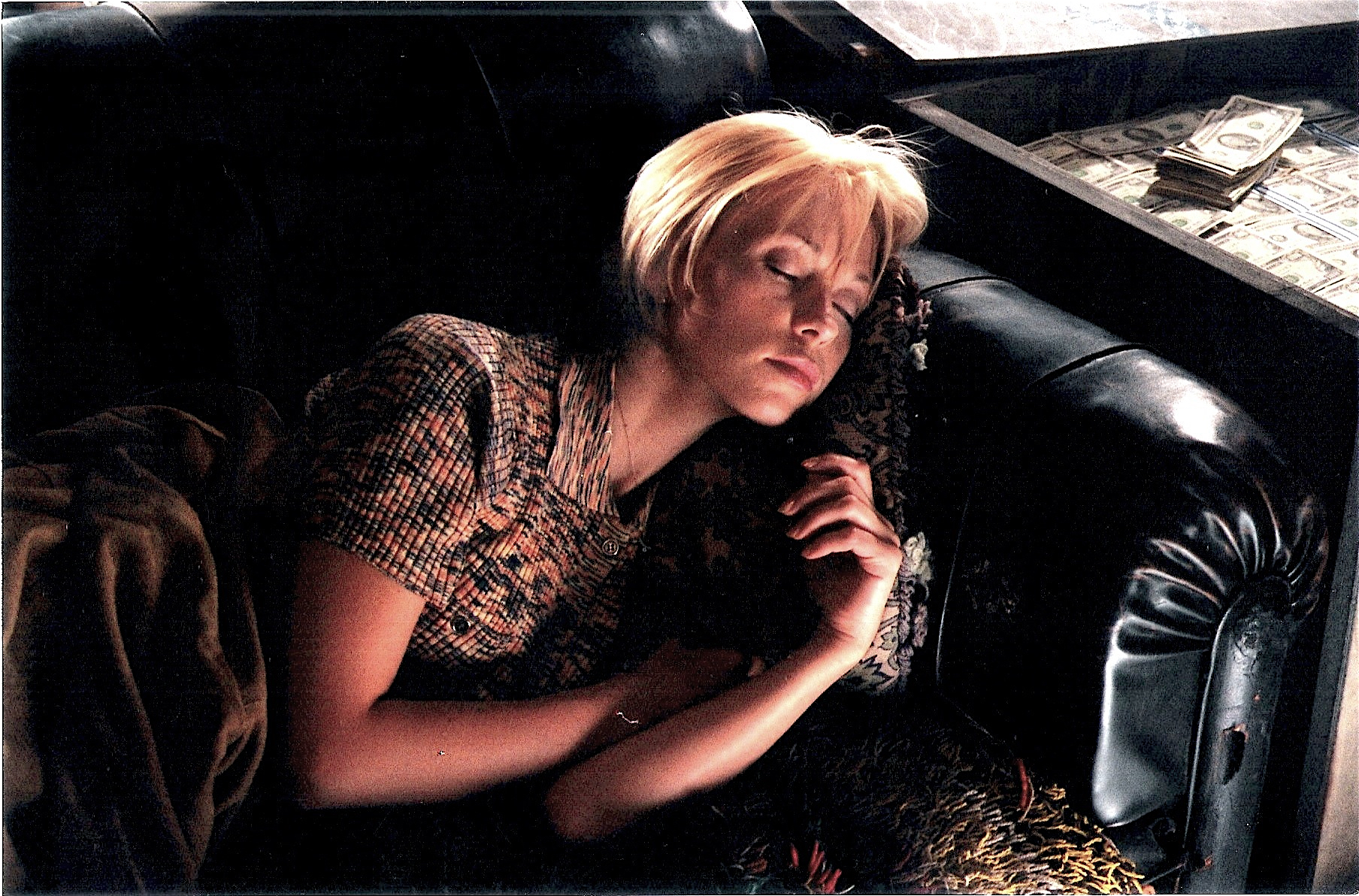
Kalda as the character Laura in the film Ristumine peateega (1999)

Piret Kalda made her film debut in the dual role of Anneke/Dorothea in the 1991 Tõnu Virve-directed historic drama Surmatants for Freya Film. This was followed by a small role as a museum employee in the Lembit Ulfsak-directed family film Lammas all paremas nurgas in 1992 for Tallinnfilm, and the role of Amanda in the 1993 Pekka Karjalainen-directed Finnish-Estonian comedy Hysteria for Fantasia Filmi Oy. In 1999, she had a starring role as Laura in the Arko Okk-directed Acuba Film comedy Ristumine peateega opposite actors Andrus Vaarik and Jaan Tätte.

In 2005, Kalda returned to the screen as Maris, in the René Vilbre-directed Taska Productions comedy family film Röövlirahnu Martin, starring Ott Sepp. The following year, she voiced the character of Paula in the Estonian animated children's film Leiutajateküla Lotte. The Lotte films and their characters proved so popular in Estonia that a theme park, Lottemaa, was subsequently opened in Reiu, Pärnu County, Estonia. In 2007, Kalda appeared in the Rainer Sarnet-directed and Peeter Sauter-penned drama Kuhu põgenevad hinged, for Exitfilm. The following year, she appeared in the Asko Kase-directed period drama Detsembrikuumus in the role of Maret Saarepuu.

In 2012, Kalda appeared as Tiina in the Ilmar Raag-directed French-Estonian drama Une Estonienne à Paris. The film follows Anne (Estonian actress Laine Mägi) who travels to Paris to care for an elderly Estonian émigré named Frida (French actress Jeanne Moreau), only to discover she is not wanted. In 2015, she played the role of Jaan's mother in the Klaus Härö-directed period drama Vehkleja (English: The Fencer), which stars Märt Avandi as a fencer and instructor wanted by the Soviet secret police who eventually has to make a life-altering decision. Vehkleja won several awards, including Best Film at Finland's 2016 Jussi Awards, and was nominated for Best Motion Picture at the 73rd Golden Globe Awards in 2016.

Kalda has also appeared in a number of short films throughout her career.

== Television ==
In addition to stage and film roles, Piret Kalda has also appeared in a number of television films and serials, beginning with the 1994 Vello Reili-directed television comedy film Armastus kolme apelsini vastu. The following year, she appeared as Aino in seven episodes of the successful Eesti Televisioon (ETV) period drama mini-series Wikmani poised, which was based on the 1988 semi-autobiographical Jaan Kross novel of the same name about students of the Wikman Private Gymnasium from 1937 until their mobilization into the armed forces during World War II.

In 2004, Kalda appeared on the ETV comedy mini-series Oli mis oli. From 2006 until 2007 Kalda appeared as Karin on the ETV crime drama series Ohtlik lend. Between 2011 and 2012, she appeared as Viire Vasen in four episodes of the popular TV3 comedy crime series Kättemaksukontor. From 2010 until 2012, she played the role of Pille in the TV3 series Unistuste agentuur. Between 2010 and 2013, she made several appearances on the ETV political satire television series Riigimehed. In 2014, she joined the cast of the Kanal 2 comedy series Parim enne as the character Meeta. In 2016, she joined the cast of the TV3 series Papad mammad as the character Ulla. She has also appeared in a number of guest roles and smaller roles in other Estonian television programs.

== Personal life ==
In 1989, Piret Kalda married actor Priit Künnapas. The couple had three daughters: Laura-Helene, Amanda Hermiine, and Aurora Aleksandra. Künnapas died of brain cancer in 2013. Kalda currently resides in Tallinn.
