= Georg Ots =

Estonian singer and actor (1920–1975)

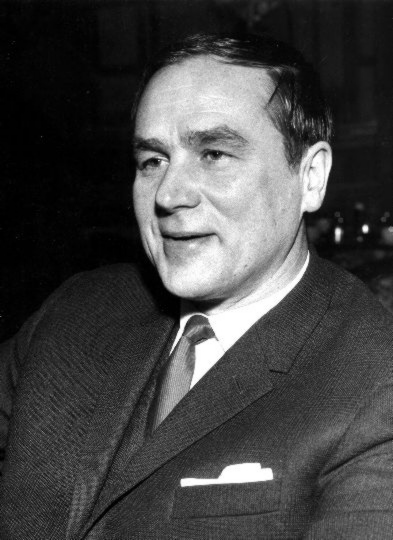
- Ots in 1962
- Born: 21 March 1920; Petrograd, Russia
- Died: 5 September 1975 (aged 55); Tallinn, then part of Estonian SSR, Soviet Union
- Occupations: Singer; actor
- Years active: 1942–1975
- Spouse(s): Margot Laane (m. 1941) Asta Saar (m. 1944–1964) Ilona Noor (m. 1964–1975)

Georg Ots (21 March 1920 – 5 September 1975) was an Estonian baritone. He sang at the Estonian National Opera from 1951 until his death in 1975. Ots gained wider recognition with his roles at the Bolshoi Theatre, particularly with his lead role in Tchaikovsky's Eugene Onegin with Galina Vishnevskaya as Tatyana. He was also celebrated for his performance in Mister Iks, based on Imre Kálmán's operetta Die Zirkusprinzessin.

== Biography ==
Before studying singing with Aleksander Rahnel in Yaroslavl, where a cultural centre for evacuated Estonians had been established, Ots was a young Navy officer. In 1941, he managed to escape a ship bombarded by the Kriegsmarine, after which he was taken to Kurgan. Six months later, he auditioned for a place at the conservatory in Tallinn, and also became a member of the chorus at the Estonian National Opera in Tallinn. His solo opera debut was a small part in Eugene Onegin in 1944. He soon became one of the most revered singers in Estonia and was equally admired all over the Soviet Union.

Ots often performed at the Bolshoi Theatre in Moscow. His repertoire included the roles of Eugene Onegin, Escamillo, Renato, Don Giovanni, Papageno, Rigoletto, Iago, Porgy, Figaro, and Kabalevsky's Colas Breugnon. Ots sang in Estonian, Finnish, French, German, Italian, and Russian. One of Ots's most famous roles with which he is often identified was the titular character in Anton Rubinstein's opera The Demon; its libretto is based on Mikhail Lermontov's famous epic poem, once banned due to its plotline involving a misalliance between a dark angel and a Georgian princess.

Ots also played a leading role in Between Three Plagues, a film based on a historical novel by Jaan Kross which illuminates the life of Balthasar Russow.

Ots performed in various European countries. After his death, the Music College of Tallinn was renamed to the Georg Ots Tallinn Music College in his honour. In 1997, Russian scientists named a newly discovered minor planet after him, 3738 Ots (1977 QA1).

His first wife, Margot Laane, fled the Nazi-occupied Estonia in 1942, and ultimately settled in Canada. Ots then wed his second wife, Asta Saar, in 1944, and they were married for 20 years until 1964. Shortly after the marriage's conclusion, in the same year, Ots married his third wife, Ilona Noor, with whom he would stay until his death. Ots had a son, Ülo, who was also a musician, and a daughter, Ülle, with his second wife Asta, and a daughter, Mariann, with his third wife Ilona.

Ots died on 5 September 1975 at the age of 55 due to complications resulting from multiple surgeries done to resolve his brain cancer, with which he was diagnosed with in 1972. He received a state funeral.

Ots's biography, written by Kulle Raig, was first published in Finnish in 2002 ("Saarenmaan valssi: Georg Otsin elämänkerta") and in Estonian in 2003. The book was published in Latvian in 2009, and in Russian in 2015.

== Legacy ==
- Georg Ots Tallinn Music College.
- Recordings with the Estonian National Symphony Orchestra and Neeme Järvi: arias from operas and operettas
- Georg Ots Street, central Tallinn.
- Asteroid "1977 QA1", named 3738 Ots.
- Cargo/passenger ferry MS Georg Ots.
