= Treading Air =

1998 novel by Jaan Kross

- Cover of 2003 published English version.
- Author: Jaan Kross
- Original title: Paigallend
- Translator: Eric Dickens
- Language: Estonian
- Genre: Novel
- Publisher: Virgela
- Publication date: 1998
- Publication place: Estonia
- English publication date: 22 May 2003
- Media type: Print (Paperback)
- Pages: 375 pp
- ISBN: 9985-862-38-4
- OCLC: 39848003
- LC Class: PH666.21.R6 P35 1998

Treading Air (orig. Estonian Paigallend) is Jaan Kross' thirteenth novel. He tells the story of the generation of Estonians with which he grew up. The unhealed wounds of recent Estonian history has been to the fore in Kross' short stories and in such novels as Wikmani poisid (The Wikman Boys), Mesmeri ring (Mesmer's Ring) and Väljakaevamised (Excavations). It was first translated into English in 2003 by Eric Dickens.

== Plot introduction ==
Treading Air is the story of Ullo Paerand. It is narrated partly in the first person from the principal character's point of view, and partly in the voice of Paerand's schoolmate Jaak Sirkel, a character in several of Kross' recent novels. The novel opens with Ullo's reminiscences of a childhood trip to Germany in the 1920s, and ends with his vision of meeting his aged father who fled to the West together with his lover.

The talented Ullo preserves memories of the happy childhood he knew before his father left and leaner years began. Together with his mother, Ullo fights for a better future. Despite minor humiliations, he gets a secondary education in one of Tallinn's best grammar schools. Soon after, due to his excellent memory and enterprising spirit, he enjoys professional success, rising to a position in the Prime Minister's Office.

But fate lets Ullo down. The Soviet and German occupations deny him the chance of an upstanding career. Ullo joins with the nationalists to work towards the restoration of the Estonian Republic, and passes over an opportunity of escaping to the West offered by a representative of the Vatican. He lives the remainder of his life - some forty years - doing menial work, and making suitcases in a factory.
