= Acuba Film =

Estonian film production company

Acuba Film is an Estonian film production company.

The company is founded in 1998 by Arko Okk and Jaan Tätte.

== Filmography ==
- "Ristumine peateega" (1999)
- "Intiimne linn" (2003, documentary film)
- "Buss" (2004, documentary film)
- "Mees animatsioonist" (2005, documentary film)
- "Koer, lennuk ja laulupidu" (2006)
- "Seal, kus lõpeb luule" (2009, documentary film)
- "Monoloogid 3D" (2011, documentary film)
- "Lootus 3D" (2011, short film)
- "Lisa, Go Home" (2012, documentary film)
- "Allan" (2014, documentary film)
- "Hei, Rasma!" (2015, documentary film)
- "Jüri!" (2015, documentary film)
