= Rakvere romaan =

1982 novel by Jaan Kross

- Author: Jaan Kross
- Cover artist: Vello Asi
- Language: Estonian
- Genre: Historical novel
- Publisher: Eesti Raamat
- Publication date: 1982
- Publication place: Estonia
- Media type: Print (hardcover)
- Pages: 303
- ISBN: 9985-862-91-0

Rakvere romaan (Estonian for Rakvere Novel) is a 1982 historical novel by Estonian writer Jaan Kross.

It's about Rakvere's struggle for the 1302 gained town rights in the 18th century when the Tiesenhausens want to own the town's land.

The book is translated into Finnish (Pietarin tiellä; 1984), Swedish (Romanen om Rakvere; 1988), Russian (Ракверский роман; 1989), German (Die Frauen von Wesenberg; 2003) and Dutch (Strijd om de stad; 2019).
