= Wikmani poisid =

Wikmani poisid may refer to:

- Wikmani poisid (novel), a 1988 novel by Jaan Kross
- Wikmani poisid (TV series), a 1995 TV series, based on the novel
