= Pärnography =

2005 film directed by Hardi Volmer

- Directed by: Hardi Volmer
- Produced by: Arko Okk, Jaan Kuks
- Production company: Acuba Film
- Release date: 2005
- Country: Estonia
- Language: Estonian

Pärnography (Estonian: Mees animatsioonist) is a 2005 Estonian documentary film directed by Hardi Volmer. The film talks about one of the most notable Estonian animator: Priit Pärn.

Awards, nominations, participations:

- 2005: Estonian Film Journalists' Association's award: nomination for Neitsi Maali award
- 2005: annual award by Cultural Endowment of Estonia (best documentary film of the year)
- 2005: Tallinn Black Nights Film Festival (PÖFF), best Estonian film
- 2006: Estonian Film Days (Estonia), best documentary film
