= Spicetone =

Company based in Estonia

- Website type: music technology, guitar effects
- Available in: English
- Headquarters: Tallinn, Estonia
- Creators: Rein Sabolotny, Taivo Saarts, Vahur Afanasjev
- Industry: Consumer electronics
- Products: effects pedals, amplifiers
- Website: spicetone.com
- Commercial: Yes
- Launched: 2013
- Current status: Active

Spicetone is a music technology company focusing on guitar effect pedals. It was founded in Estonia by Vahur Afanasjev, Rein Sabolotny and Taivo Saarts in 2013.
