= Martens Clause =

International law human rights statement

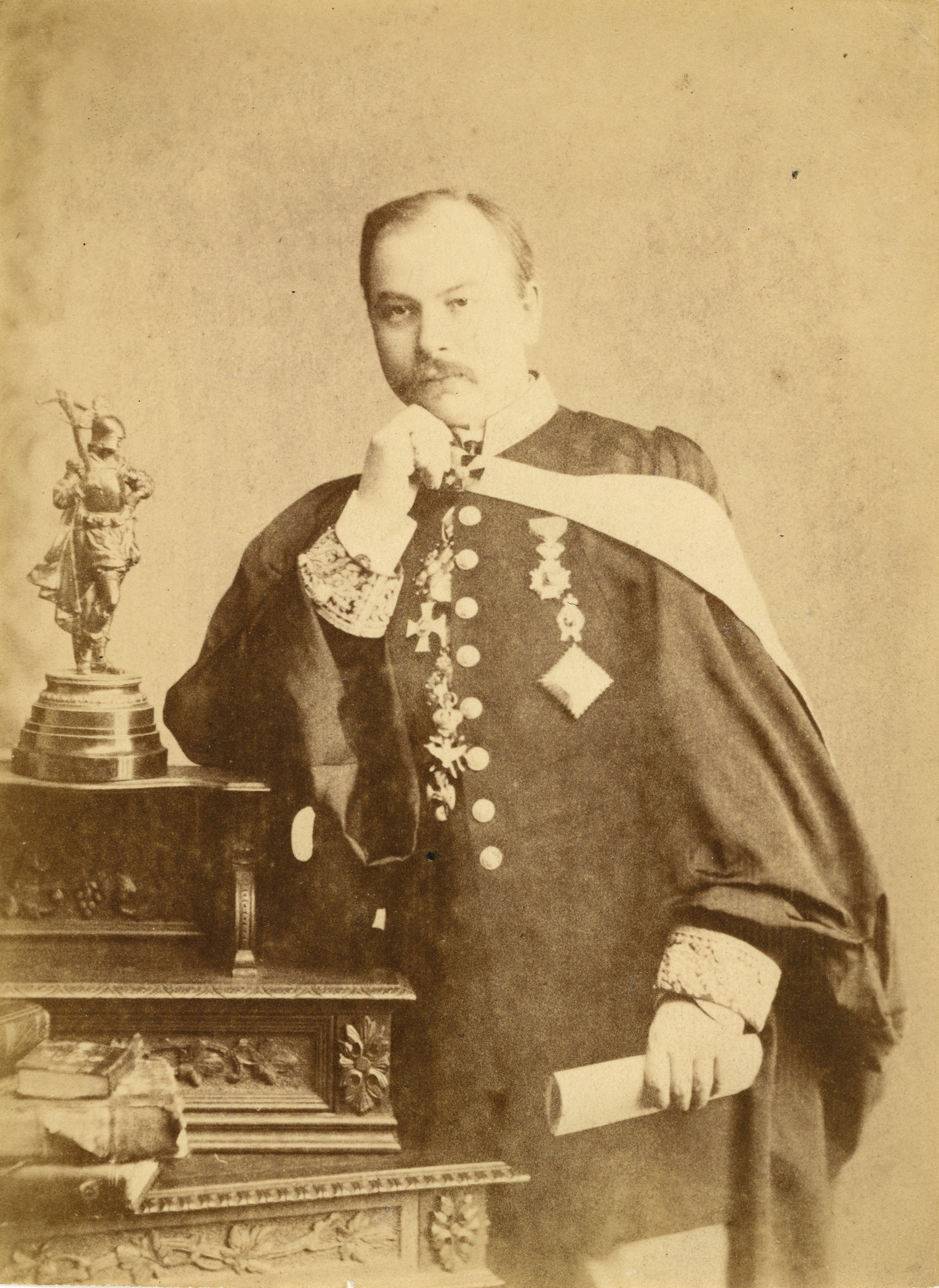
Diplomat Friedrich Martens from which the clause takes its name.

The Martens Clause (pronounced /mar'tɛnz/) is an early international law concept first introduced into the preamble of the 1899 Hague Convention II – Laws and Customs of War on Land. There are differing interpretations of its significance on modern international law, with some scholars simply treating the clause as a reminder international customary law still applies after a treaty is ratified while others take a more expansive approach where the clause provides that because international treaties cannot be all encompassing, states cannot use that as a justification for an action.

== Clause ==
The clause took its name from a declaration read by Friedrich Martens, the delegate of Russia at the Hague Peace Conferences of 1899. The Clause was introduced as compromise wording for the dispute between the Great Powers who considered francs-tireurs to be unlawful combatants subject to execution on capture and the smaller states who maintained that they should be considered lawful combatants. It reads as follows:

Until a more complete code of the laws of war is issued, the High Contracting Parties think it right to declare that in cases not included in the Regulations adopted by them, populations and belligerents remain under the protection and empire of the principles of international law, as they result from the usages established between civilized nations, from the laws of humanity and the requirements of the public conscience.

— Convention with respect to the laws of war on land (Hague II), 29 July 1899.

The Clause appears in a slightly modified form in the 1907 Hague conventions:

Until a more complete code of the laws of war has been issued, the High Contracting Parties deem it expedient to declare that, in cases not included in the Regulations adopted by them, the inhabitants and the belligerents remain under the protection and the rule of the principles of the law of nations, as they result from the usages established among civilized peoples, from the laws of humanity, and the dictates of the public conscience.

— Laws and Customs of War on Land (Hague IV), 18 October 1907

The clause did not appear in any of the Geneva Conventions of 1949, but it would be included in the additional protocols of 1977. It is in article 1 paragraph 2 of Protocol I (which covers international conflicts), and the fourth paragraph of the preamble to Protocol II (which covers non-international conflicts). The wording in both is identical but slightly modified from the version used in the Hague Convention of 1907:

Recalling that, in cases not covered by the law in force, the human person remains under the protection of the principles of humanity and the dictates of the public conscience

== Analysis ==
In its commentary (Geneva 1987), the ICRC states that although the Martens Clause is considered to be part of customary international law, the plenipotentiaries considered its inclusion appropriate because:

First, despite the considerable increase in the number of subjects covered by the law of armed conflicts, and despite the detail of its codification, it is not possible for any codification to be complete at any given moment; thus the Martens clause prevents the assumption that anything which is not explicitly prohibited by the relevant treaties is therefore permitted. Secondly, it should be seen as a dynamic factor proclaiming the applicability of the principles mentioned regardless of subsequent developments of types of situation or technology.

Rupert Ticehurst, a Lecturer in Law, at King's College School of Law in London, wrote that:

The problem faced by humanitarian lawyers is that there is no accepted interpretation of the Martens Clause. It is therefore subject to a variety of interpretations, both narrow and expansive. At its most restricted, the Clause serves as a reminder that customary international law continues to apply after the adoption of a treaty norm. A wider interpretation is that, as few international treaties relating to the laws of armed conflict are ever complete, the Clause provides that something which is not explicitly prohibited by a treaty is not ipso facto permitted. The widest interpretation is that conduct in armed conflicts is not only judged according to treaties and custom but also to the principles of international law referred to by the Clause.

The evidence that Ticehurst presents is that just as in 1899 there was a disagreement between the great powers and the minor powers that lead to the formulation of the Clause, so in 1996 a similar divergence of views exists between the declared nuclear powers and the non nuclear powers with the nuclear powers taking a narrow view of the Clause and the non nuclear powers taking a more expansive view.

Ticehurst concludes that:

... By refusing to ratify treaties or to consent to the development of corresponding customary norms, the powerful military States can control the content of the laws of armed conflict. Other States are helpless to prohibit certain technology possessed by the powerful military States. ... the Martens Clause establishes an objective means of determining natural law: the dictates of the public conscience. This makes the laws of armed conflict much richer, and permits the participation of all States in its development. The powerful military States have constantly opposed the influence of natural law on the laws of armed conflict even though these same States relied on natural law for the prosecutions at Nuremberg. The ICJ in its Advisory Opinion did not clarify the extent to which the Martens Clause permits notions of natural law to influence the development of the laws of armed conflict. Consequently, its correct interpretation remains unclear. The Opinion has, however, facilitated an important debate on this significant and frequently overlooked clause of the laws of armed conflict.

=== ICJ advisory opinion on Nuclear Weapons ===
The International Court of Justice (ICJ) in their advisory opinion on the Legality of the Threat or Use of Nuclear Weapons issued on 8 July 1996, had to consider the general laws of armed conflict before they could consider the specific laws relating to nuclear weapons. Several different interpretations of Martens's clause were presented in oral and written submissions to the ICJ. Although the ICJ advisory opinion did not provide a clear understanding of the Clause, several of submissions to the court provided an insight into its meaning.

== Judicial review ==
Several national and international courts have considered the Martens Clause when making their judgements. In none of these cases however have the laws of humanity or the dictates of the public conscience been recognised as new and independent right. The clause served rather as general statement for humanitarian principles as well as guideline to the understanding and interpretation of existing rules of international law.

The Martens Clause was quoted in the following judicial rulings:

- Decision of the Supreme Court of Norway on 27 February 1946 in appeal proceedings against Karl-Hans Hermann Klinge, Kriminalassistent of the Gestapo (confirmation of the death sentence imposed by the first instance)
- Decision of the US military tribunal III in Nuremberg on 10 February 1948 in the case United States v. Krupp
- Decision of the Netherlands court of cassation on 12 January 1949 in the procedure against SS-Obergruppenführer Hanns Rauter, general commissioner for the safety organization in the Netherlands from 1940 to 1945
- Decision Brussels military courts (Conseil de guerre de Bruxelles) in the K.W. case on 8 February 1950
- Decision of the International Criminal Tribunal for the Former Yugoslavia on 8 March 1996 over the permission of the accusation during the process against Milan Martić (case IT-95-11, decision IT-95-11-R61)
- Decision of the Constitutional Court of Colombia of 18 May 1995 for the constitutionality of Protocol II Additional to the Geneva Conventions of 12 August 1949, and Relating to the Protection of Victims of Non-International Armed Conflicts. (decision C-225/95)
- The International Court of Justice advisory opinion on the Legality of the Threat or Use of Nuclear Weapons issued on 8 July 1996
- Judgement of the German Federal Constitutional Court on 26 October 2004 for the compatibility of the expropriations in the former Soviet zone of occupation between 1945 and 1949 with international law (decision BVerfG, 2 BvR 955/00 of 26.10.2004)
