= Estonian Institute =

Organization based in Estonia

- Founded: 1989; 37 years ago
- Founder: Government of Estonia
- Type: Cultural institution
- Location: Tallinn Estonia
- Region served: Worldwide
- Product: Estonian cultural education
- Owner: private

The Estonian Institute (Estonian: Eesti Instituut) is a non-governmental and non-profit organisation based in Tallinn aiming to promote Estonian culture abroad. The institute was founded in 1988/1989 as a shadow foreign office for the Estonian independence movement by Lennart Meri, later first foreign minister and first president of Estonia after their Soviet occupation. Current director of the institute is Katrin Maiste.

The institute currently employs a dozen persons, who work either in the Tallinn main office or branches abroad in Finland (Helsinki, founded in 1995) and Hungary (Budapest, est. 1998); previously, the Institute had offices in Sweden (1999–2011) and France (2001–2009). Also 3 teachers of the Estonian language and culture work outside Estonia.

The contributors include several prominent people of their field as authors of the texts, editors, board members, designers and creators of information technology applications.

The basis of the activities of the Estonian Institute as a non-governmental institution is its constitution. The work is directed by the General Meeting and the Governing Board elected for three years. The Board elected in September 2017 includes Katrin Maiste (chairman), Liina Luhats, and Mart Meri. As of September 2017 the non-profit organisation has 37 members.

The Estonian Institute is supported from state budget via the Ministry of Culture. This is supplemented by targeted financing from various sources for specific undertakings. The teaching of Estonian language and culture is organised in close cooperation with the Ministry of Education and Research.

The Estonian Institute is member of the European Union National Institutes for Culture EUNIC. The Institute's activities rely on the principles of the code of ethics of Estonian non-governmental organisations.

== History ==
The foundation of the Estonian Institute as civic initiative in the late 1980s derived from the practical need to establish permanent international contacts, which would no longer be controlled by the Soviet authorities. The plan compiled in summer 1988 by Lennart Meri listed the tasks of the Institute as follows: developing permanent cultural and educational foreign relations and introducing Estonia abroad. On 4 October 1988, the cultural council of the creative associations whose purpose was to restore Estonia's independence, decided to found the Estonian Institute. The official permit was granted in April 1989, and thus for the first six months the Institute operated thanks to the work of volunteers and the support of Estonia's friends.

During its first years, the Estonian Institute partly fulfilled the role of a hotbed for the Ministry of Foreign Affairs and the future Estonian diplomats. The Institute's information and culture points operated in various places in Western Europe and Scandinavia, and quite a few developed into an embassy of the Republic of Estonia in the course of restoring diplomatic relations. Soon things took their normal course and the Institute focused on conveying information about Estonia and promoting its culture. Supported by the state, it has become a serious institution to carry out cultural politics.

== Activities ==
The aim of the Estonian Institute is to spread information about Estonian society and culture in other countries, further cultural and educational links and organise the teaching of Estonian language and culture outside Estonia.

Over the years the institute has published dozens of information booklets and periodicals about Estonia, compiled web pages, organised festivals, exhibitions, conferences and seminars, received journalists, researchers and lecturers, translators and writers, opened culture and information centres in other countries, granted scholarships, despatched lecturers of Estonian language and culture to universities abroad and supplied the study centres with relevant material.

Presently, the institute's main areas of activity are publishing diverse brochures, organising cultural events abroad and maintaining several web sites, which include the online encyclopaedia Estonica and the Estonian cultural events calendar Culture.ee. The Estonian Institute also organises conferences, festivals, exhibitions and seminars about Estonian culture, replies to Estonia-related queries, and receives translators, journalists, researchers, writers, and lecturers.

== Publications ==
- Information booklets about Estonia
- Estonian Literary Magazine
- Magazine Estonian Art

== See also ==
- Cultural Diplomacy
- Public diplomacy
- British Council
- Alliance Française
