= The Czar's Madman =

1978 novel by Jaan Kross

- First edition
- Author: Jaan Kross
- Original title: Keisri hull
- Translator: George Kurman or Anselm Hollo
- Language: Estonian
- Genre: Historical novel
- Publisher: Eesti Raamat
- Publication date: 1978
- Publication place: Estonia
- English publication date: 1992
- Media type: Print (Hardback & Paperback)
- Pages: 352

The Czar's Madman (Estonian: Keisri hull) is a 1978 novel by Estonian writer Jaan Kross.

== Plot introduction ==
This historical novel is about a Livonian nobleman, Timotheus Eberhard von Bock, who has married a peasant girl named Eeva to prove everyone that good men are equal before nature, God and ideals. Eeva's brother Jakob analyses von Bock's life throughout his journal and tries to figure out if the nobleman is truly mad as everyone seems to believe. The Czar's Madman is arguably one of the best-known Estonian novels in the world.

=== Title ===
The "Czar's Madman" is a reference to the main character who has been imprisoned for being so bold as to talk frankly to the Czar. This is enough to bring accusations of 'insanity'.

== Plot summary ==
The story is written in diary form, describing the impact of revolutionary thinking on the part of a family member.

Aristocrat Timotheus von Bock (the diarist's brother in law) writes a letter to the Czar criticising the way in which the Czar's family runs the country. He justifies this act by an oath made to the Czar to give an honest appraisal of the situation.

Von Bock is imprisoned as a traitor (although the reason for his imprisonment is kept secret, as is the letter) for 9 years before being released into house arrest on the basis that he is 'mad'.

== Characters ==
- Timotheus "Timo" von Bock – main character and colonel
- Eeva von Bock – wife of Timo
- Jakob Mättik – brother of Eeva (the narrator of the story)

== Awards and nominations ==
Winner of the 1989 Le prix du Meilleur livre étranger.

== Publication history ==
- 1978, Estonia, Tallinn: Eesti Raamat (ISBN NA), Pub date ? ? 1978, (original Estonian)
- 1992, UK, Harvill (ISBN 0-00-271181-8), Pub date 2 November 1992, Hardback (Translated by George Kurman)
- 1993, US, Pantheon Books (ISBN 0-394-58437-6), Pub date ? January 1993, Hardback (Translated by Anselm Hollo)
- 1993, UK, Harvill (ISBN 0-00-271201-6), Pub date 2 August 1993, Paperback (Translated by Anselm Hollo)
- 1994, US, The New Press (ISBN 1-56584-121-2), Pub date ? ? 1994, paperback (Translated by Anselm Hollo)
- 2001, UK, The Harvill Press (ISBN 1-86046-579-X), Pub date 27 July 2001, Paperback (Translated by Anselm Hollo)
