= Vahur Afanasjev =

Estonian writer (1979–2021)

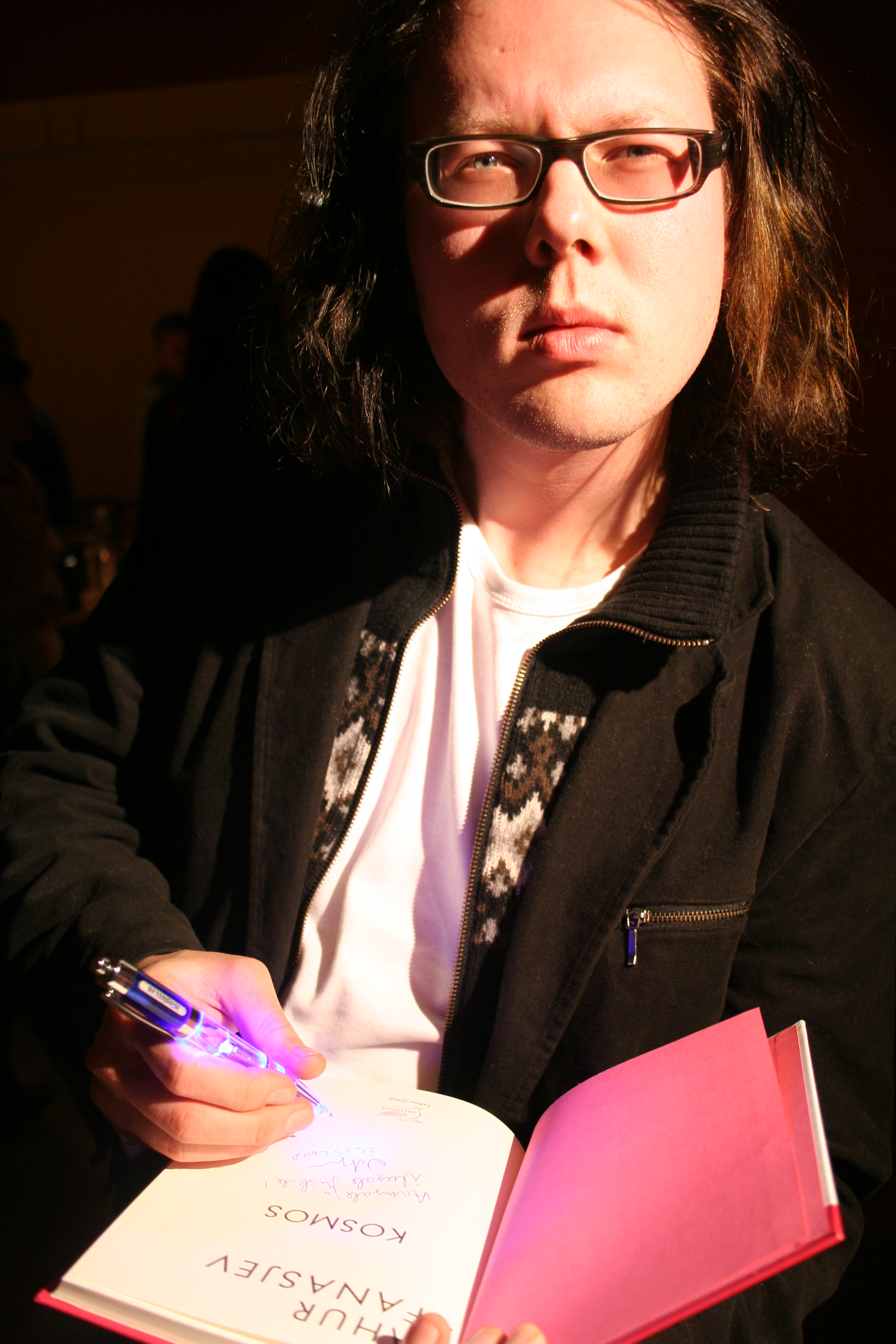
- Afanasjev at the presentation of his novel "Kosmos" in Tartu Literature House, 2008
- Born: Vahur Laanoja; 24 August 1979; Tartu, Estonia
- Died: 10 April 2021 (aged 41)
- Writing career
- Pen name: Vahur Afanasjev; DJ Jumal (DJ God); Vahur [€] Afanasjev
- Literary movement: Tartu Young Authors' Association
- Website: vahurafanasjev.com

Vahur Afanasjev (born Vahur Laanoja; 24 August 1979 – 10 May 2021) was an Estonian novelist, poet, musician and film director best known for his novel Serafima and Bogdan a story following the lives in a village of Russian Orthodox Old Believers on the shore of the lake Peipus from the end of the World War II to the nineties. The novel won the 2017 Estonian Writers' Union's Novel Competition.

== Biography ==
Afanasjev graduated from the University of Tartu in 2002, majoring in economic policy. He was a member of a literary group called Tartu Young Authors' Association since 1998, and a member of the Estonian Writers' Union since 2006. He worked as a journalist, media analyst, copywriter, creative director, and PR officer.

From 2005 to 2010, Afanasjev lived in Brussels, Belgium. He summed up his life as a euro official in the European Economic and Social Committee in his 2011 travelogue My Brussels.

He was awarded the Baltic Assembly Prize for Literature in 2021. He died unexpectedly on 10 May 2021.

Afanasjev's last completed works were published posthumously, these include the collection of poems Tuulevaiksed aastad (2021) and a novel Rail Baltic ehk kelmitants vanaisa sarvedega (2022).

== Writing ==
Afanasjev began his writing career with poems and lyrics in 1995. In 1997–98, he published three poetry collections on the internet. His first poems were published in the Estonian literary magazine Vikerkaar in 1998. He published poetry books, short stories, and novels. His works have been published in several collections of various authors in English, Finnish, Russian, Romanian, Dutch, and Hungarian.

=== Works ===
Poetry:

- Kandiline maailm (Square World) 2000
- Kaantega viin (Wrapped Vodka or Folded Vienna or I Take with Covers) 2004
- Katedraal Emajões (Cathedral in Mother River) 2006
- Eesti vaarao (Estonian Pharaoh) 2013
- Kuidas peab elama (How Should We Live) 2014
- Tünsamäe tigu (Snail from Tünsamäe) 2015
- Hõbehundi laulud (Songs of a Silver Wolf) 2020
- Tuulevaiksed aastad (The Years of the Silence of the Wind) 2021

Novels:

- Kastraat Ontariost (A Castrato from Ontario) 2005
- Kosmos (Cosmos) 2008
- Serafima ja Bogdan (Serafima and Bogdan) an epic novel published 2017 in Estonian, 2019 in Russian
- Õitsengu äärel (On the Brink of Bloom) 2020
- Rail Baltic 2022

Other Prose

- Kanepi kirik (Ganja Church or The Church of Kanepi Village) 2002 (a book of short stories)
- Kaadrid otsustavad (Shots Decide) 2007 (a comedy book)

Non-fiction:

- Minu Brüssel (My Brussels) 2011
- Kuidas taluda Tartut (How to Tolerate Tartu) 2023

=== Awards ===
- Elise Rosalie Aun Literary Prize 2018.
- Estonian Cultural Endowment's Award for Prose 2018 (Kirjanduse sihtkapitali proosaauhind), for the novel Serafima and Bogdan
- Viru Literature Prize (Virumaa kirjandusauhind) 2018, for the novel Serafima and Bogdan
- First Prize, Estonian Novel Competition 2017, issued by Estonian Writers’ Union, for the novel Serafima and Bogdan
- Estonian Cultural Endowment's Award for Poetry 2016 (Kirjanduse sihtkapitali luuleauhind), for the poetry book Snail from Tünsamäe
- Go Travel Travelogue Award 2012 for My Brussels
- The Writer of Estonia 2010 (Eesti Kirjanik 2010), awarded by Juhan Liivi Selts

=== Honors ===
Honorary Citizen of Peipsiääre parish, with a badge of honor.

=== Style ===
His style was described as socially critical magic realism flavoured with obscurities. His characters included parasite worms, murderers, corrupted journalists, robots, and lonely gay men. "...2008 saw the publication of his short novel Cosmos. This is a peculiar tale that could be characterised as Brokeback Mountain meets Fear and Loathing in Las Vegas."

== Music ==
In addition to his writing, Afanasjev made electronic music (project tra_art), punk-like electric guitar rock, blues and country (project Kurluk Ulica), and experimental noisepop (project Kannibal Elektor).

A CD of tra_art was published with Vahur Afanasjev's book Kanepi Kirik (2002). Two of his recordings were on a CD of singing writers.

He also wrote lyrics for Orelipoiss, Skriimsilm, and Päris Anny.

== Film ==
Afanasjev made experimental short films since 2006, and used photos and Microsoft PowerPoint in film production. In June 2008, he presented his autobiographical documentary film Where Dreams End and was threatened with a court case concerning it. The film had its official premiere at the Eclectica festival. In April 2009, Afanasjev finished production of a documentary film called Rong Way about the complicated train travel between Estonia and Western Europe.
