= Georg Friedrich von Martens =

German jurist and diplomat

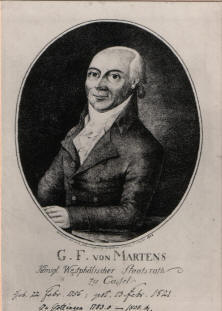
Georg Friedrich von Martens.

Georg Friedrich von Martens (22 February 1756 in Hamburg, Germany – 21 February 1821 in Frankfurt, Germany) was a German jurist and diplomat. Educated at the universities of Göttingen, Regensburg and Vienna, he became professor of jurisprudence at Göttingen in 1783 and was ennobled in 1789. He was made a counsellor of state by the King of Westphalia in 1808, and in 1810 was president of the financial section of the council of state of the kingdom of Westphalia. In 1814 he was appointed privy cabinet-councillor (Geheimer Kabinettsrat) by the king of Hanover, and in 1816 went as representative of the king to the diet of the new German Confederation at Frankfort.

== Works ==
Of his works the most important is the great collection of treaties Recueil des traites, from 1761 onwards. Of this the first seven volumes were published at Göttingen (1791–1801), followed by four supplementary volumes partly edited by his nephew Karl von Martens (see below).

These were followed by:

- Nouveau recueil, of treaties subsequent to 1808, in 16 vols. (Göttingen, 1817–1842), of which G. F. von Martens edited the first four, the fifth being the work of K. von Martens, the others (6–9) by F. Saalfeld and (10–16) F. Murhard. A Nouveau supplement, in 3 vols., filling gaps in the previous collection, was also published by Murhard (Göttingen, 1839–1842).
- Nouveau recueil ... continuation du grand recueil de Martens, in 20 vols. (Göttingen, 1843–1875), edited in turn by F. Murhard, C. Murhard, J. Pinhas, C. Samwer and J. Hopf, with a general index of treaties from 1494 to 1874 (1876).
- Nouveau recueil, ser. 2 (Göttingen, 1876–1896; vols. xxii-xxxv, Leipzig, 1897–1908). From vol. xi on this series was edited by Felix Stork, professor of public law at Greifswald. In 1909 appeared vol. i of a further Continuation (troisieme serie) under the editorship of Professor Heinrich Triepel (1868–1946) of Kiel University.

Of Martens' other works the most important are:

- Precis du droit des gens modernes de l'Europe (1789; 3rd ed., Göttingen, 1821; new ed., G.S. Pinheiro-Ferreira, 2 vols., 1858, 1864);
- Erzählungen merkwürdiger Falk des neueren europäischen Volkerrechts, 2 vols. (Göttingen, 1800–1802);
- Cours diplomatique ou tableau des relations des puissances de l'Europe, 3 vols. (Berlin, 1801);
- Grundriss einer diplomatischen Gesch. der europ. Staatshandel u. Friedensschlusse seit dem Ende des 15. Jahrhunderts (ibid. 1807).

His nephew Karl von Martens (1790–1863), (who at his death was minister resident of the grand-duke of Weimar at Dresden), published:

- the Manuel diplomatique (Leipzig, 1823), a valuable textbook of the rules and customs of the diplomatic service – reissued as Guide diplomatique in two vols. in 1832 (5th ed. by Geffcken, 1866);
- Causes célèbres du droit des gens (2 vols., ibid., 1827) and Nouvelles causes célèbres (2 vols., ibid., 1843), both republished, in 5 vols. (1858–1861); and Recueil manuel et pratique de traités (7 vols., ibid., 1846–1857); continued by Geffcken (in 3 vols., 1885–1888).
