= Arko Okk =

Estonian film operator, director and producer

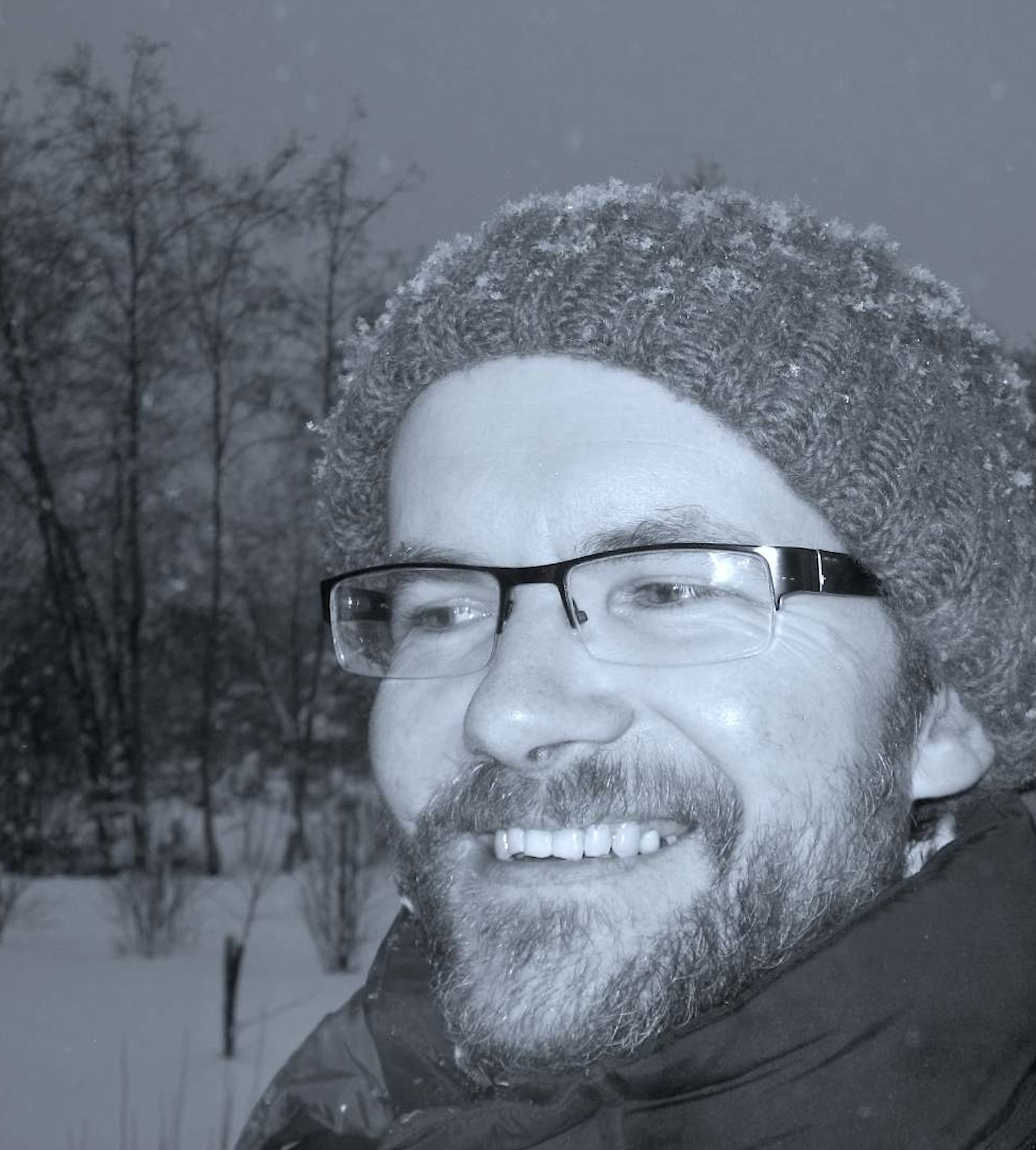
Arko Okk

Arko Okk (born 25 December 1967 in Tallinn) is an Estonian cinematographer, director and producer.

In 1998 he co-founded (with Jaan Tätte) the production studio OÜ Acuba Film.

== Filmography ==
- "Tulivesi" (1994; feature film; operator)
- "Minu Leninid" (1997; feature film; operator)
- "Ristumine peateega" (1999; feature film; director)
- "Agent Sinikael" (2002; feature film; operator)
- "Sigade revolutsioon" (2004; feature film; operator)
- "Monoloogid" (2011; documental film; director)
