= The Highway Crossing =

1999 film directed by Arko Okk

Ristumine peateega
- Directed by: Arko Okk
- Produced by: Arko Okk
- Production company: Acuba Film
- Release date: 1999
- Country: Estonia
- Language: Estonian

Ristumine peateega (English: The Highway Crossing) is a 1999 Estonian drama film directed by Arko Okk and based on the Jaan Tätte's play Ristumine peateega ehk muinasjutt kuldsest kalakesest.

The film talks about a young couple (Laura and Roland) who after unsuccessful hitchhiking and due to bad weather, tries to find a shelter at a nearby country house. House owner Osvald thinks that their visiting is not a random one. Osvald behaves strangely and makes unique offering for the couple. Osvald wants to buy Roland's wife. The couple is confused and try to figure out the motives of this offering.

Awards:

- 1999: Stockholm International Film Festival, FIPRESCI award for the best feature film in the category "Northern Lights"
- 2000: Uruguay International Film Festival (Montevideo), Best Opera Prima
- 2000: Hong Kong International Film Festival, participating

== Cast ==
- Andrus Vaarik as Osvald
- Piret Kalda as Laura
- Jaan Tätte as Roland
- Emil Urbel as Goldfish
- Andres Tarand as Voice of Goldfish
