= Kolme katku vahel =

1970 novel by Jaan Kross

- Cover of 1970 published version
- Author: Jaan Kross
- Language: Estonian
- Publication place: Estonia

Kolme katku vahel (Between Three Plagues) is a novel by the Estonian author Jaan Kross. It was first published in 1970. The main character of the historical novel is Balthasar Russow (1536–1600), one of the most important Livonian and Estonian chroniclers.

It was published in English translation in three volumes in 2016, 2017, and 2022 as Between Three Plagues (vol. 1: The Ropewalker; vol. 2: A People Without a Past; vol. 3: A Book of Falsehoods).

== Publication in English ==
- The Ropewalker. Between Three Plagues, vol. 1 (London: MacLehose Press. 2016; translation by Merike Lepasaar Beecher) ISBN 9781784299781
- A People Without a Past. Between Three Plagues, vol. 2 (London: MacLehose Press, 2017; translation by Merike Lepasaar Beecher) ISBN 9781784299545
- A Book of Falsehoods. Between Three Plagues, vol. 3 (London: MacLehose Press, 2022; translation by Merike Lepasaar Beecher) ISBN 9780857055163
