= Balthasar Russow =

Estonian writer

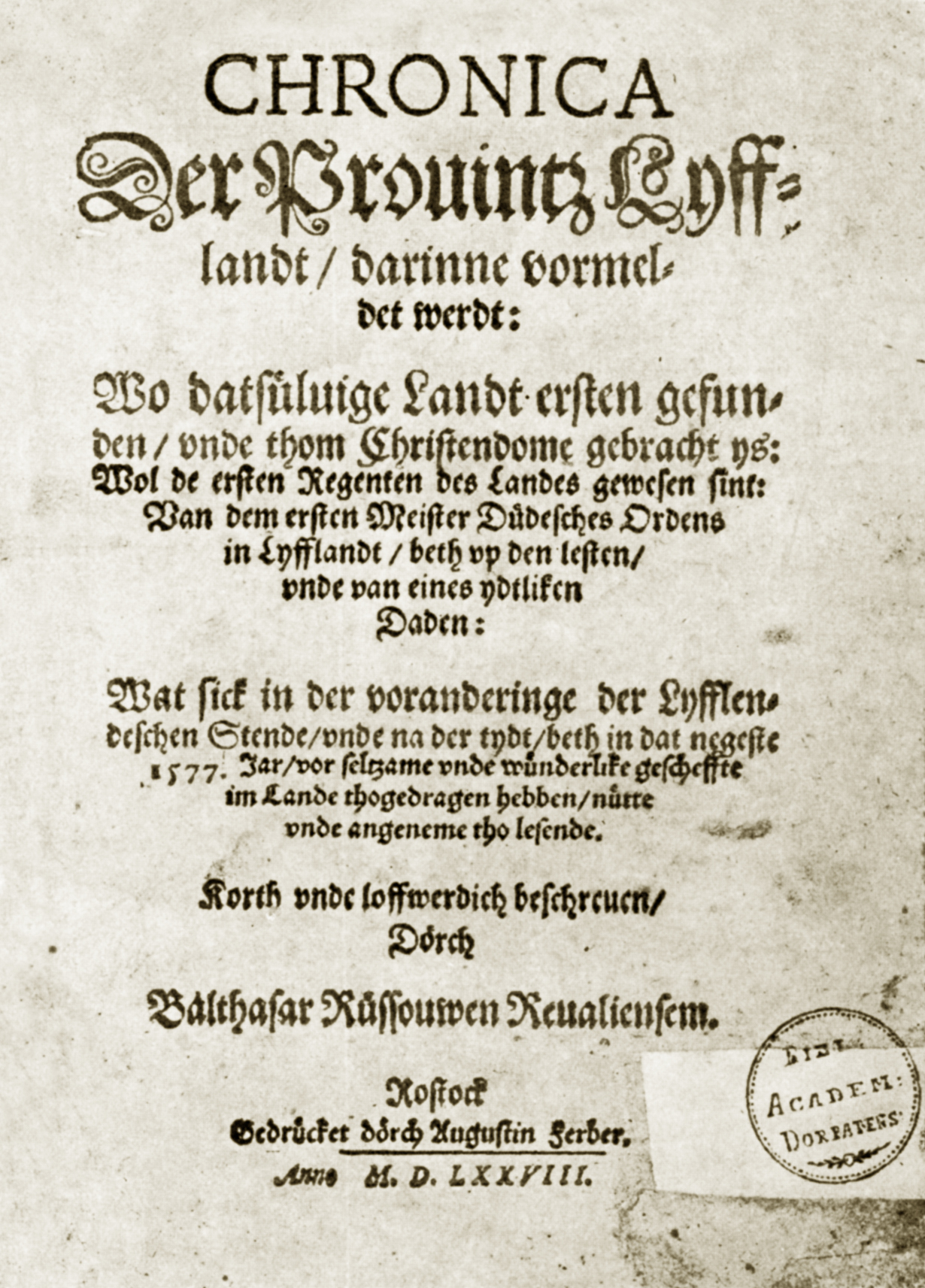
The Chronicle of Livonia by Balthasar Russow, published in 1578

Balthasar Russow (1536–1600) was one of the most important Livonian and Estonian chroniclers.

Russow was born in Reval, Livonia (now Tallinn, Estonia). He was educated at an academy in Stettin, Pomerania (now Szczecin, Poland). He was the Lutheran pastor of the Estonian congregation at the Holy Spirit Church in Reval from 1566 until his death.

Russow is most famous for his Low German-language chronicle Chronica der Provinz Lyfflandt describing the history of Livonia, especially the decline of the Livonian Order and the period of the Livonian War (1558–83). The chronicle was first printed in Rostock in Mecklenburg in 1578 and quickly sold out. The revised edition was printed in 1584.

In his work Russow was highly critical of the squander and immorality of the Livonian upper classes. He also complained about the superstitious beliefs and pagan traditions of the Estonian peasants and the venality of mercenary armies during the wars. He praised the rule of the new regional power, Sweden.

Russow is the main character in Kolme katku vahel (Between Three Plagues), a four-part historical novel by modern Estonian writer Jaan Kross, the first part published in 1970.

== Sources ==
- Balthasar Russow, Cronaca del Baltico in fiamme. Chronica der Prouintz Lyfflandt (1584), complete Italian translation, with introduction and notes by Piero Bugiani, Ed. Vocifuoriscena, Viterbo 2021, pp. 584
