= Eesti Raamat =

Estonian publishing house

Eesti Raamat (Eesti Raamat OÜ) is an Estonian publisher which is located in Tallinn. It publishes mainly fiction, including children's literature.

The publisher was established in 1964.

== Book series ==
- "Ajast aega"
- "Eesti novellivara"
- "Eesti romaanivara"
- "Klassikalised lood"
- "Maailm ja mõnda"
- "Mirabilia"
- "Nobeli laureaat"
- "Noorus ja maailm"
- "Nüüdisromaan"
- "Põhjamaade romaan"
- "Saja rahva lood"
- "Varamu"
