= Estonian Literary Magazine =

Biannual magazine published in Estonia

- Editor: Berit Kaschan
- Categories: Literary magazine
- Frequency: Biannual
- Publisher: Estonian Institute
- Founded: 1995; 31 years ago
- Country: Estonia
- Based in: Tallinn
- Language: English
- Website: ELM

Estonian Literary Magazine or simply ELM is an English language biannual literary magazine published in Estonia.

== History and profile ==
ELM was established in 1995 and is published by the Estonian Institute. The goal of the magazine is to promote Estonian literature and it is published twice per year in spring and autumn. ELM covers articles on former and current Estonian authors and poets as well as book reviews published in English language.

The editor of the magazine is Berit Kaschan. The members of the editorial board are Tiit Aleksejev (Estonian Writers Union), Adam Cullen (Estonian Writers Union), Peeter Helme (Estonian Writers Union), Ilvi Liive (Estonian Literature Centre), Helena Läks (Estonian Writers Union), Mart Meri (Estonian Institute), Piret Viires (Tallinn University) and Helena Koch (Estonian Children's Literature Centre)
