= Wikmani poisid (novel) =

1988 novel by Jaan Kross

- Author: Jaan Kross
- Cover artist: Vello Asi
- Language: Estonian
- Genre: Novel
- Publisher: Eesti Raamat
- Publication date: 1988
- Publication place: Estonia
- Pages: 528 pp
- ISBN: 5-450-00609-8
- OCLC: 20457874
- LC Class: PH666.21.R6 W55 1988

Wikmani poisid (English: The Wikman Boys) is a semi-autobiographical novel by Estonian writer Jaan Kross, published in 1988.

A TV-series based on the novel was produced in 1994.
