= Martna Parish =

Former municipality of Estonia

Coordinates: 58.856°N 23.804°E

Martna Parish Martna vald
- Former municipality of Estonia
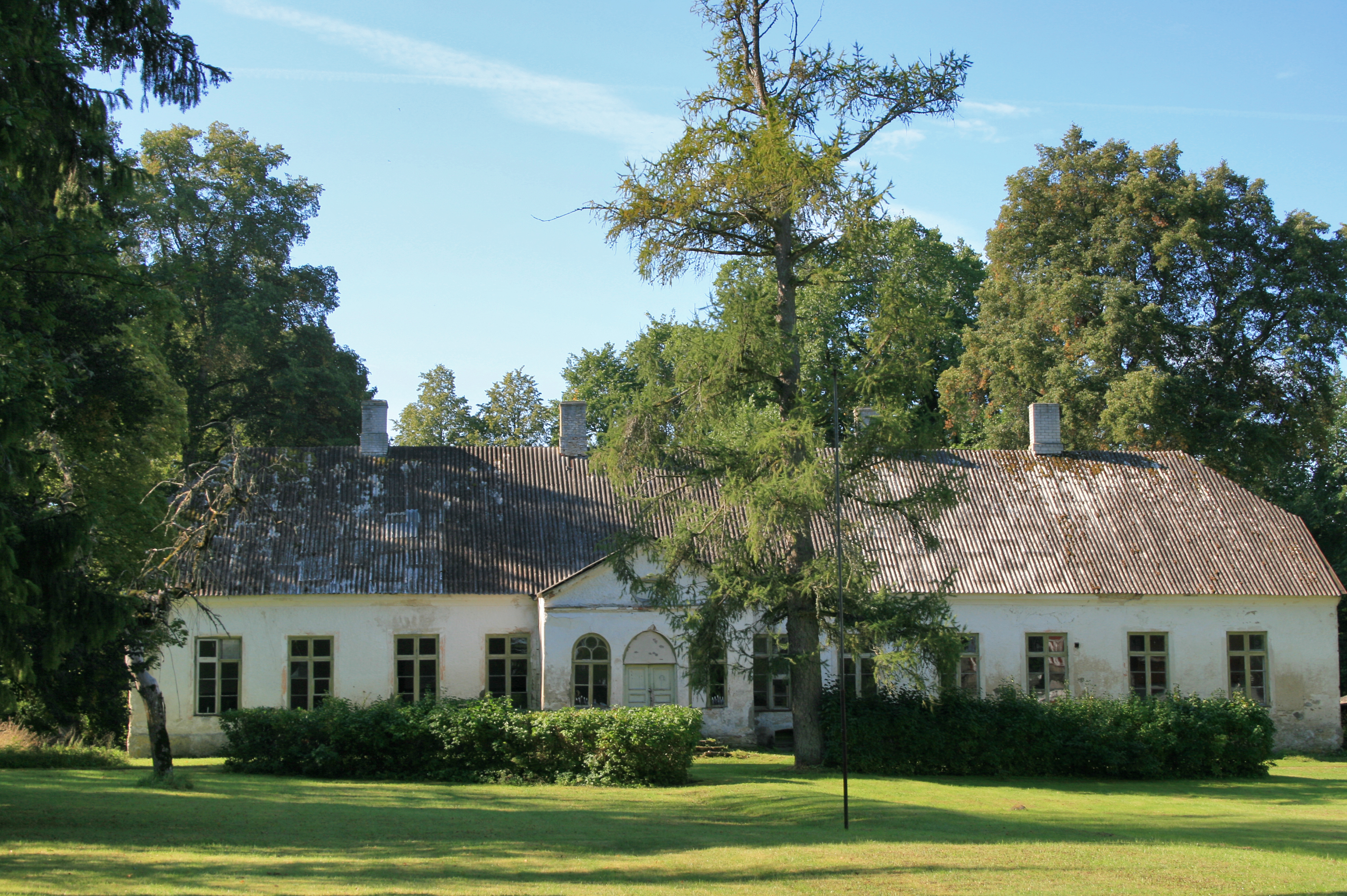
- Putkaste manor

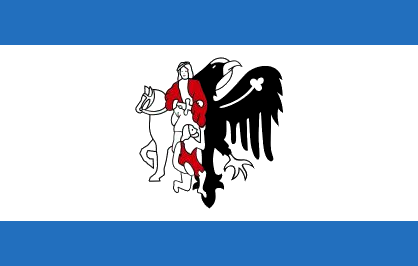
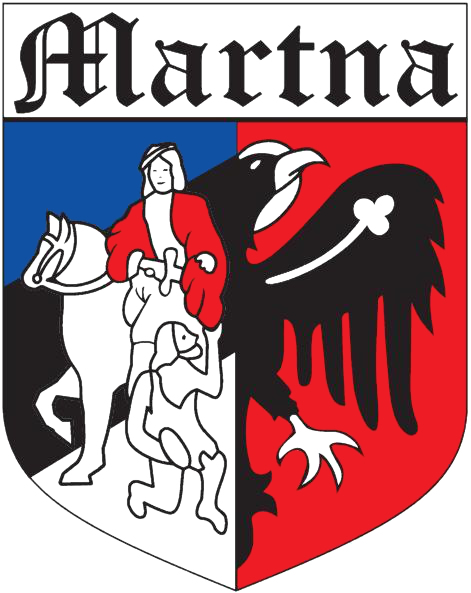
- Flag Coat of arms

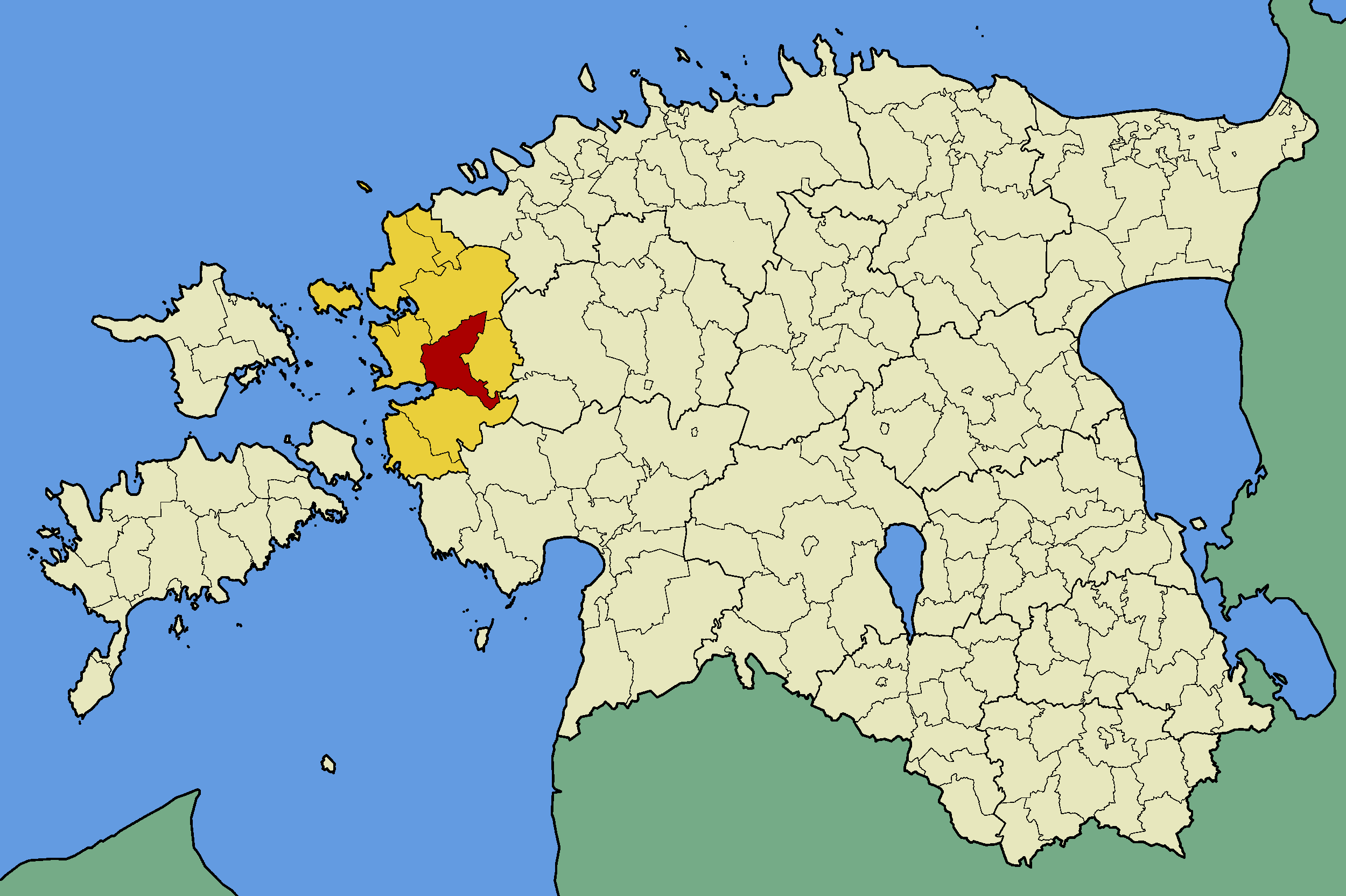
- Martna Parish within Lääne County.
- Country: Estonia
- County: Lääne County
- Administrative centre: Martna

Area
  - Total: 269 km^{2} (104 sq mi)

Population (2016)
  - Total: 760
  - Density: 2.8/km^{2} (7.3/sq mi)
- Website: www.martna.ee

Martna (Estonian: Martna vald) was a rural municipality of Estonia, in Lääne County. It had a population of 760 (2016) and an area of 269 km².

== Villages ==
Martna Parish had 33 villages:

Allikotsa, Ehmja, Enivere, Jõesse, Kaare, Kaasiku, Kabeli, Kasari, Keravere, Keskküla, Keskvere, Kesu, Kirna, Kokre, Kurevere, Laiküla, Liivaküla, Martna, Männiku, Niinja, Nõmme, Ohtla, Oonga, Putkaste, Rannajõe, Rõude, Soo-otsa, Suure-Lähtru, Tammiku, Tuka, Uusküla, Väike-Lähtru, Vanaküla.
