= Oru Parish =

Former municipality of Estonia

Coordinates: 58°59′42″N 23°42′46″E

Oru Parish Oru vald
- Former municipality of Estonia
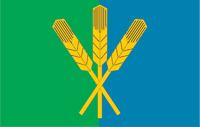
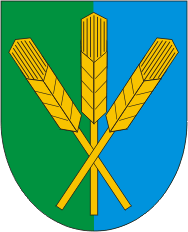
- Flag Coat of arms

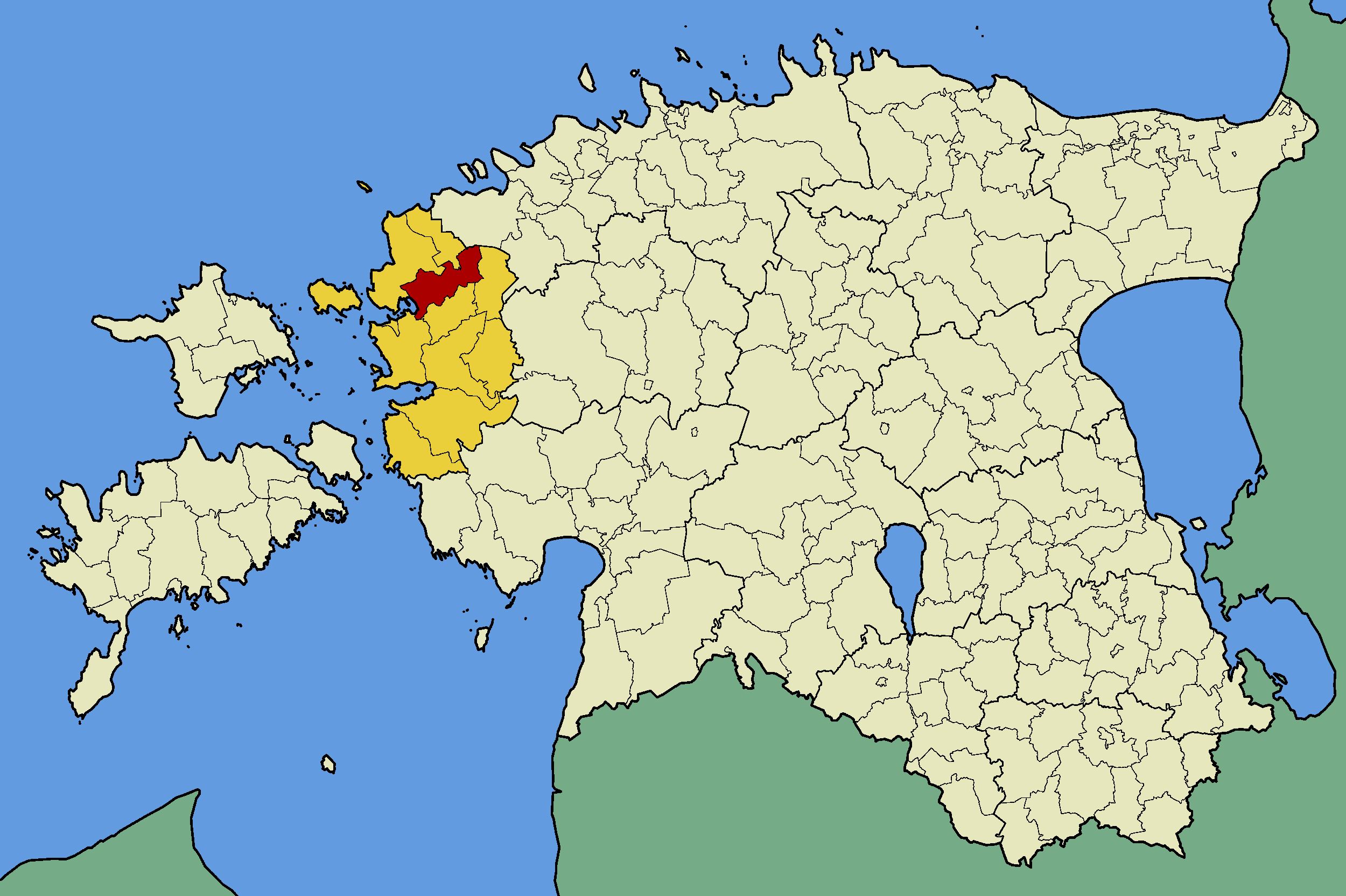
- Oru Parish within Lääne County in 2009.
- Country: Estonia
- County: Lääne County
- Administrative centre: Linnamäe

Area
  - Total: 197.7 km^{2} (76.3 sq mi)

Population (2008)
  - Total: 932
  - Density: 4.71/km^{2} (12.2/sq mi)
- Website: www.oruvald.ee

Oru Parish (Estonian: Oru vald) was a rural municipality in Lääne County, Estonia, that existed from 1992 to 2013.

After the municipal elections held on 20 October 2013, Oru Parish was merged with neighbouring Risti and Taebla parishes and a new Lääne-Nigula Parish was established.

In 2008 it had a population of 932 and an area of 197.7 km².

== Settlements ==
Oru Parish had 15 villages:Auaste, Ingküla, Jalukse, Keedika, Kärbla, Linnamäe, Niibi, Oru, Mõisaküla, Salajõe, Saunja, Seljaküla, Soolu, Uugla and Vedra.
