= Taebla Parish =

Former municipality of Estonia

Coordinates: 58°57′14″N 23°45′08″E

Taebla Parish Taebla vald
- Former municipality of Estonia
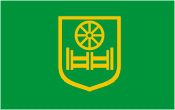
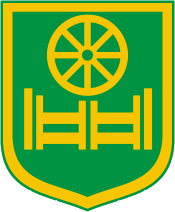
- Flag Coat of arms

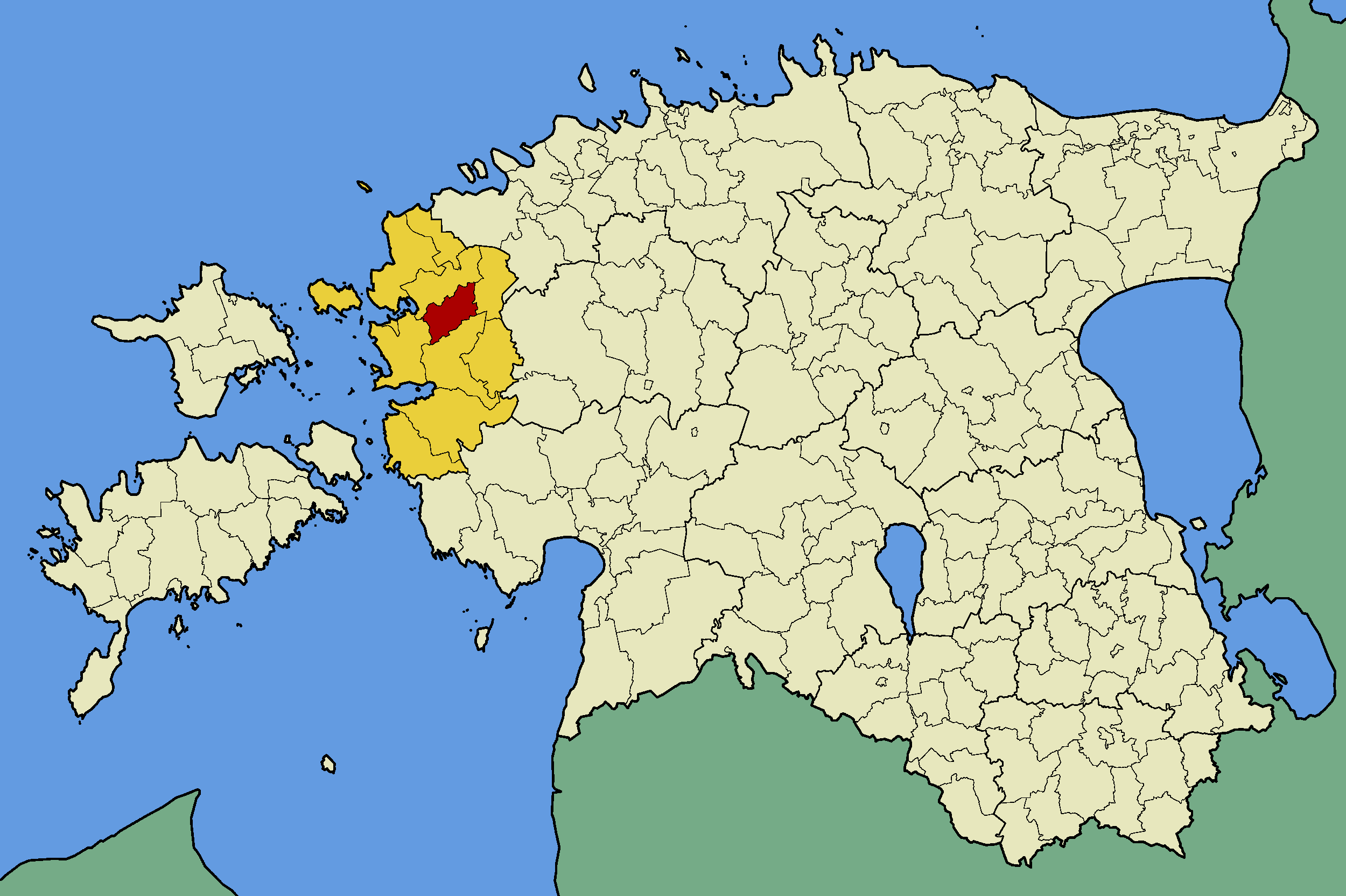
- Taebla Parish within Lääne County in 2009.
- Country: Estonia
- County: Lääne County
- Administrative centre: Taebla

Area
  - Total: 141 km^{2} (54 sq mi)

Population (2008)
  - Total: 2,911
  - Density: 20.6/km^{2} (53.5/sq mi)
- Website: www.taebla.ee

Taebla Parish (Estonian: Taebla vald) was a rural municipality in Lääne County, Estonia, that existed from 1992 to 2013.

After the municipal elections held on 20 October 2013, Taebla Parish was merged with neighbouring Oru and Risti parishes and a new Lääne-Nigula Parish was established.

In 2008 it had a population of 2,911 and an area of 141 km^{2}.

== Populated places ==
Taebla Parish had 2 small boroughs (Palivere and Taebla) and 15 villages: Allikmaa, Kadarpiku, Kedre, Kirimäe, Koela, Leediküla, Luigu, Nigula, Nihka, Pälli, Tagavere, Turvalepa, Väänla, Vidruka and Võntküla.
