= Risti Parish =

Former municipality of Estonia

Coordinates: 58°33′38″N 23°50′22″E

Risti Parish Risti vald
- Former municipality of Estonia
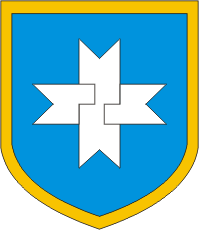
- Flag Coat of arms

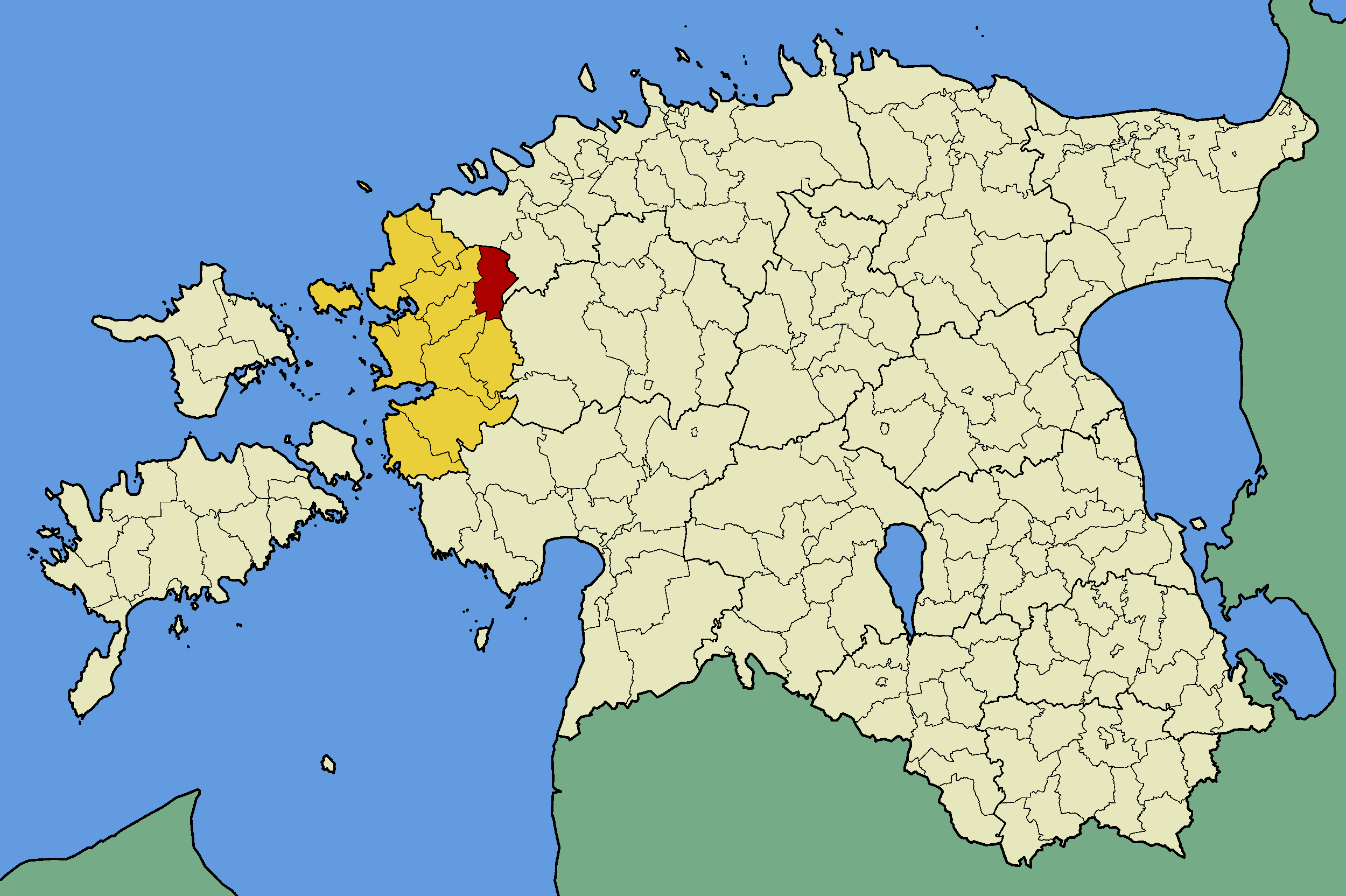
- Risti Parish within Lääne County in 2009.
- Country: Estonia
- County: Lääne County
- Administrative centre: Risti

Area
  - Total: 167.8 km^{2} (64.8 sq mi)

Population (2008)
  - Total: 863
  - Density: 5.14/km^{2} (13.3/sq mi)
- Website: www.risti.ee

Risti Parish (Estonian: Risti vald) was a rural municipality in Lääne County, Estonia, that existed from 1992 to 2013.

After the municipal elections held on 20 October 2013, Risti Parish was merged with neighbouring Oru and Taebla parishes and a new Lääne-Nigula Parish was established.

In 2008 it had a population of 863 and an area of 167.8 km^{2}.

== Populated places ==
Risti Parish had 1 small borough (Risti) and 4 villages: Jaakna, Kuijõe, Piirsalu and Rõuma.
