= Kuluse =

Village in Estonia

- Village
- Location within Estonia
- Coordinates: 58°51′29″N 23°49′12″E
- Country: Estonia
- County: Lääne County
- Parish: Lääne-Nigula Parish

Population (2011)
  - Total: 13
- Time zone: UTC+2 (EET)
  - Summer (DST): UTC+3 (EEST)

Kuluse is a village in Lääne-Nigula Parish, Lääne County, in western Estonia. Before to the administrative reform of the Estonian municipalities in 2017, the village belonged to the municipality of Martna.
