= Tuka =

Tuka may refer to:

- Tuka (rapper), a rapper from the Australian hip-hop group Thundamentals
- Christiano "Tuka" Rocha (1982–2019), Brazilian race car driver
- Buqa Temür (alternately Tuka Timur), khan of the Chagatai Khanate (1272?-1282)
- Tuka, Estonia, village in Lääne-Nigula Parish, Lääne County, Estonia
- Tuka (surname)
