= Kesu =

Kesu may refer to:

== Places ==
- Kesu, Lääne County, village in Lääne-Nigula Parish, Lääne County, Estonia
- Kesu, Rapla County, village in Märjamaa Parish, Rapla County, Estonia

== Other uses ==
- Kesu (film), an Indian children's film released in 2010.
- Kesu, the mascot for the Kerala Blasters football club
- KESU-LP, a low-power radio station (94.9 FM) licensed to serve Lihue, Hawaii, United States
- KESU-LP (Hanamaulu, Hawaii), a defunct low-power television station (channel 6) formerly licensed to serve Hanamaulu, Hawaii
