= Ongar =

Ongar may refer to:

== Essex, England ==
- Ongar, Essex, a civil parish
- Chipping Ongar, a town
  - Ongar railway station, a former London Underground station
- Hundred of Ongar, an ancient administrative unit
- High Ongar, a village in Essex

== Other uses ==
- Ongar, Dublin, Ireland, a suburb
- Ongar, Sindh, an archaeological site in Pakistan
- Ongar (Pakistan) railway station
- Ileana Ongar (born 1950), Italian Olympic hurdler

== See also ==
- Onga (disambiguation)
