= Kabeli, Lääne County =

Village in Estonia

Coordinates: 58°47′10″N 23°56′07″E

Kabeli
- Village
- Interactive map of Kabeli
- Country: Estonia
- County: Lääne County
- Parish: Lääne-Nigula Parish
- Time zone: UTC+2 (EET)
  - Summer (DST): UTC+3 (EEST)

Kabeli is a village in Lääne-Nigula Parish, Lääne County, in western Estonia.

Before the administrative reform in 2017, the village was in Martna Parish.
