= Saunja =

Saunja may refer to places :

- Saunja, India, village in South Bihar, India
- Saunja, Harju County, village in Estonia
- Saunja, Lääne County, village in Estonia
