= Keskküla, Lääne County =

Village in Estonia

Coordinates: 58°44′57″N 24°01′15″E

Keskküla
- Village
- Interactive map of Keskküla
- Country: Estonia
- County: Lääne County
- Parish: Lääne-Nigula Parish
- Time zone: UTC+2 (EET)
  - Summer (DST): UTC+3 (EEST)

Keskküla is a village in Lääne-Nigula Parish, Lääne County, in western Estonia. Before the administrative reform in 2017, the village was in Martna Parish.

== Name ==
Keskküla was attested in written sources as Groodt Keszküll and Klein Keszküll in 1534, and as Keskull maior and Keskull minor in 1539. The names refer to a former pair of villages, literally 'big Keskküla' and 'little Keskküla'. In the 18th century, the latter developed into what is now Kasari, and the former developed into Keskküla Manor. The name literally means 'middle village'.
