= Jõesse =

Village in Estonia

Coordinates: 58°53′N 23°45′E

- Village
- Interactive map of Jõesse
- Country: Estonia
- County: Lääne County
- Parish: Lääne-Nigula Parish
- Time zone: UTC+2 (EET)
  - Summer (DST): UTC+3 (EEST)

Jõesse (German: Jesse) is a village in Lääne-Nigula Parish, Lääne County, in western Estonia.

Before the administrative reform in 2017, the village was in Martna Parish.
