= Enivere =

Village in Lääne County, Estonia

Coordinates: 58°51′04″N 23°47′13″E

- Village
- Interactive map of Enivere
- Country: Estonia
- County: Lääne County
- Parish: Lääne-Nigula Parish
- Time zone: UTC+2 (EET)
  - Summer (DST): UTC+3 (EEST)

Enivere (German: Sternberg) is a village that is located in Lääne-Nigula Parish, Lääne County, in western Estonia.

Before the administrative reform in 2017, the village was in Martna Parish.
