= Keskvere =

Keskvere may refer to several places in Estonia:

- Keskvere, Lääne County, village in Lääne-Nigula Parish, Lääne County
- Keskvere, Saaremaa Parish, village in Saaremaa Parish, Saare County
- Pöide-Keskvere, village in Saaremaa Parish, Saare County, known as Keskvere before 2017
