= Vedra (disambiguation) =

Vedra is a municipality in Spain.

Vedra may also refer to:

== Places ==
- Es Vedrà, an island off Ibiza, Spain
- Vedra, Estonia, a village in Estonia
- Vedra Valles, a valley on the planet Mars

== Other uses ==
- Es Vedra (song) on the album Metallic Spheres by The Orb
- Vedra, a steam pilot tender, formerly HMS Squirrel (1904)
