= Unga =

Unga or UNGA may refer to:

== Organizations ==
- United Nations General Assembly, or UNGA
- Unga Group, a flour milling company

== People ==
- Tēvita ʻUnga (c. 1824 1879), Tongan Crown Prince and Prime Minister
- Harvey Unga (born 1988), American football running back

== Places ==
- Unga Island, in Alaska, United States
- Unga, Alaska, a ghost town
- Unga L.T.D., an administrative ward in Tanzania
- Unga Station, in Nagareyama, Japan

== Other uses ==
- Unga (crab), or coconut crab
- Unga (fish), a fish of Cameroon
- Unga (unit), a Scottish land measurement
- Unga, a street name for heroin

== See also ==
- Oonga (disambiguation)
- Ounga (disambiguation)
- Yunga (disambiguation)
