= Tagavere =

Tagavere may refer to several places in Estonia:

- Tagavere, Lääne County, village in Taebla Parish, Lääne County
- Tagavere, Saare County, village in Orissaare Parish, Saare County
