= Kaare, Estonia =

Village in Estonia

Coordinates: 58°49′20″N 23°48′18″E

Kaare
- Village
- Interactive map of Kaare
- Country: Estonia
- County: Lääne County
- Parish: Lääne-Nigula Parish
- Time zone: UTC+2 (EET)
  - Summer (DST): UTC+3 (EEST)

Kaare is a village in Lääne-Nigula Parish, Lääne County, in western Estonia.

Before the administrative reform in 2017, the village was in Martna Parish.
