= Ehmja =

Village in Estonia

Coordinates: 58°52′N 23°46′E

- Village
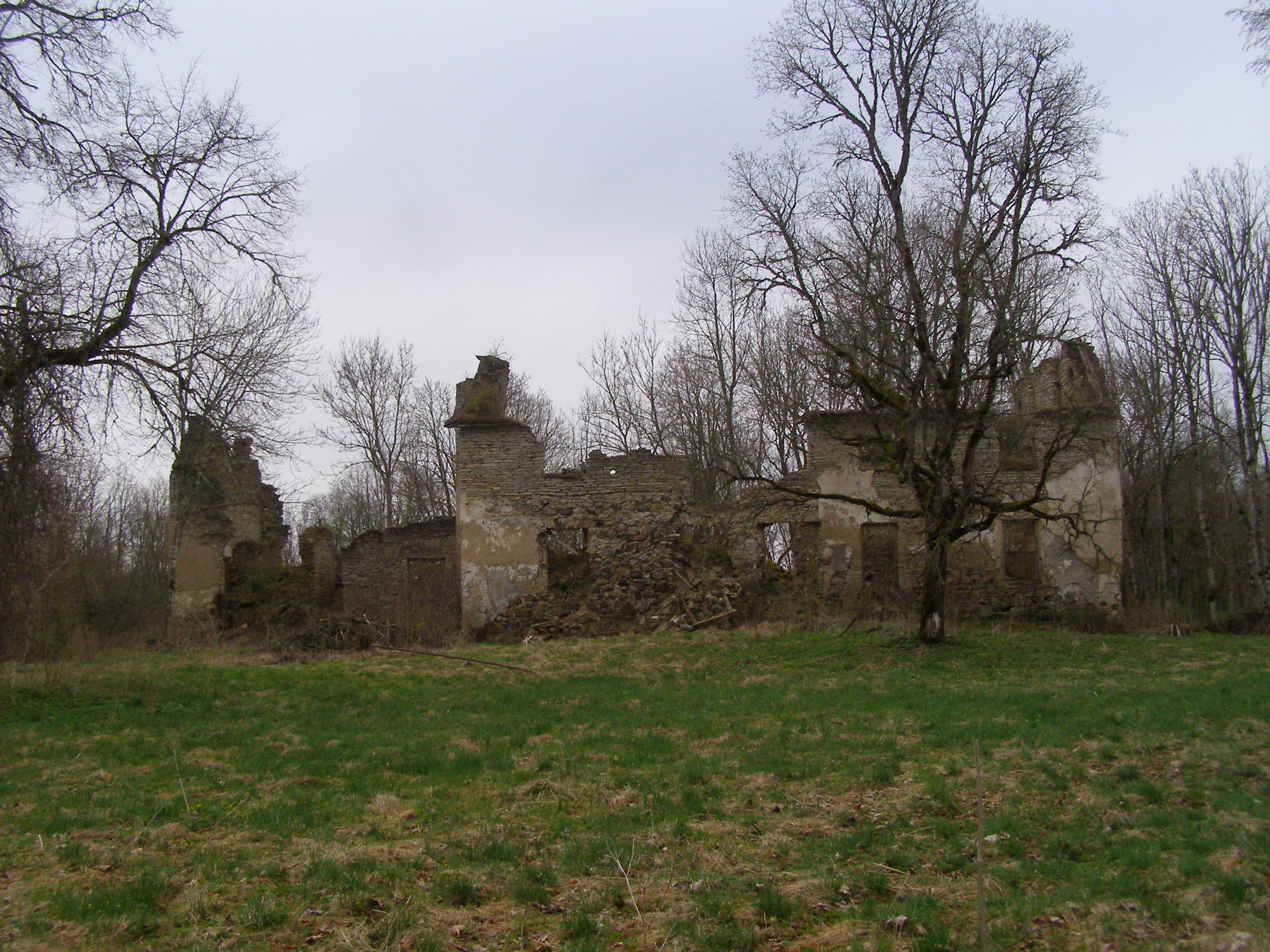
- Ruins of Ehmja manor
- Interactive map of Ehmja
- Country: Estonia
- County: Lääne County
- Parish: Lääne-Nigula Parish
- Time zone: UTC+2 (EET)
  - Summer (DST): UTC+3 (EEST)

Ehmja (German: Echmes) is a village in Lääne-Nigula Parish, Lääne County, in western Estonia. Before the administrative reform in 2017, the village was in Martna Parish.
