= Putkaste =

Putkaste may refer to several places in Estonia:

- Putkaste, Hiiu County, village in Hiiumaa Parish, Hiiu County
- Putkaste, Lääne County, village in Lääne-Nigula Parish, Lääne County
