= Kirna =

Kirna may refer to:

- The Kirna (locally known as Kirna House, previously also Grangehill), a villa in Walkerburn, Scottish Borders, Scotland
- Kırna, a village and municipality in Julfa Rayon, Nakhchivan, Azerbaijan
- Kirna, Järva County, a village in Türi Parish, Järva County, Estonia
- Kirna, Lääne County, a village in Lääne-Nigula Parish, Lääne County, Estonia
- Kirna, Rapla County, a village in Märjamaa Parish, Rapla County, Estonia
