= Salajõgi Landscape Conservation Area =

Protected area in Estonia

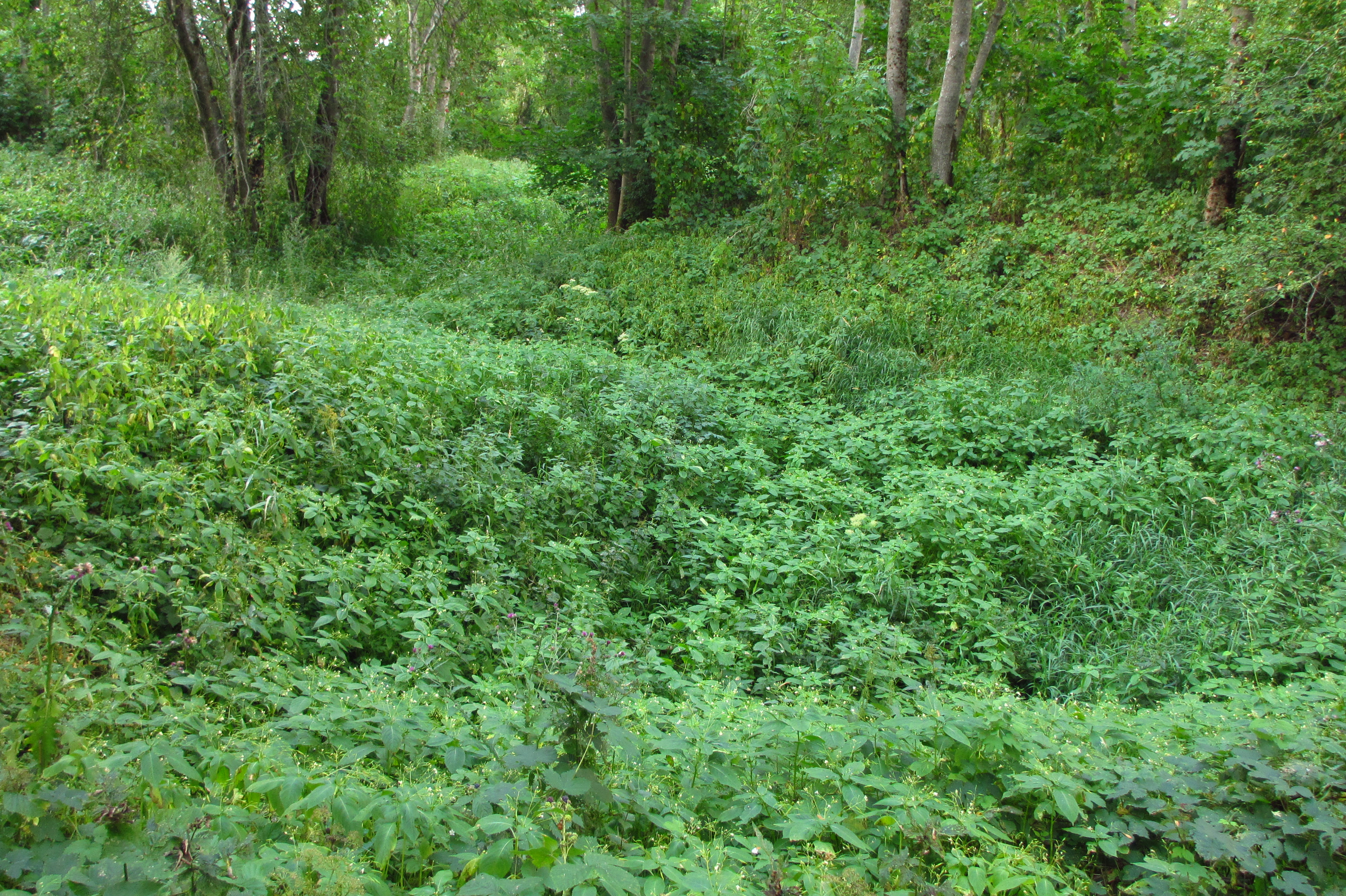

- Location within Estonia
- Location: Estonia
- Coordinates: 59°01′20″N 23°40′00″E
- Area: 16 ha (40 acres)
- Established: 1964 (2001)

Salajõgi Landscape Conservation Area (Estonian: Salajõe maastikukaitseala) is a nature park in Lääne-Viru County, Estonia.

The area of the nature park is 16 ha.

The protected area was founded in 1964 to protect Salajõe karst area and its surrounding areas. In 2001, the protected area was designated a landscape conservation area.
