= Kokre =

Kokre refers to the following places:

- Kokre, Estonia, village in Estonia
- Kokre, Prilep, village in North Macedonia
