= Kasari =

Village in Estonia

Coordinates: 58°44′N 24°01′E

- Village
- Interactive map of Kasari
- Country: Estonia
- County: Lääne County
- Parish: Lääne-Nigula Parish
- Time zone: UTC+2 (EET)
  - Summer (DST): UTC+3 (EEST)

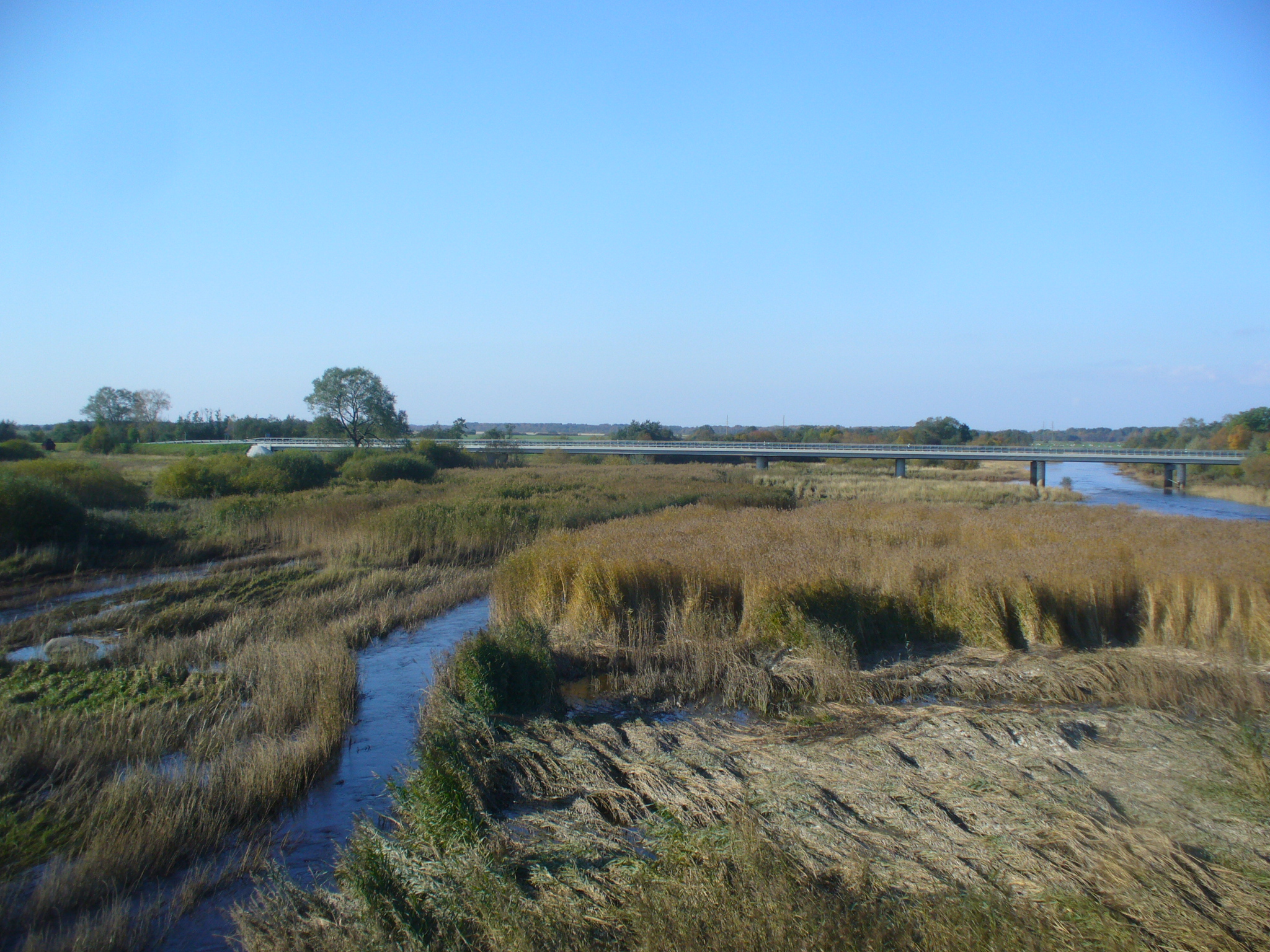
Bridge in Kasari

Kasari (German: Kasargen) is a village in Lääne-Nigula Parish, Lääne County, in western Estonia.

== Name ==
Kasari was attested as Klein Keszküll in 1534 and as Keskull minor in 1539—literally 'little Keskküla' (with Keskküla meaning 'middle village')—in contrast to neighboring 'big Keskküla' (now simply Keskküla). The name Kasari was applied in the 18th century and attested in 1798. The name is derived from the manor owner Kassari Baranoff (German: Kaszjan von Baranoff, Russian: Касьян Захарович Баранов; died 1628), who acquired the area during the Livonian War in the 16th century. The episcopal manor was established at the site of the mill and was recorded as Kiwisell in 1565.

== History ==
In 1977, the former village of Kurgema was merged with Kasari. Before the administrative reform in 2017, the village was in Martna Parish.
