= Männiku, Lääne County =

Village in Lääne-Nigula Parish, Lääne County, in western Estonia

Coordinates: 58°47′31″N 23°52′07″E

Männiku
- Village
- Interactive map of Männiku
- Country: Estonia
- County: Lääne County
- Parish: Lääne-Nigula Parish
- Time zone: UTC+2 (EET)
  - Summer (DST): UTC+3 (EEST)

Männiku is a village in Lääne-Nigula Parish, Lääne County, in western Estonia.
