= Linnamäe, Lääne County =

Village in Estonia

Coordinates: 58°59′43″N 23°42′50″E

Linnamäe
- Village
- Interactive map of Linnamäe
- Country: Estonia
- County: Lääne County
- Parish: Lääne-Nigula Parish
- Time zone: UTC+2 (EET)
  - Summer (DST): UTC+3 (EEST)

Linnamäe is a village in Lääne-Nigula Parish, Lääne County, in western Estonia.
