= Nõmme, Lääne-Nigula Parish =

Village in Estonia

Coordinates: 58°53′55″N 23°57′21″E

Nõmme
- Village
- Interactive map of Nõmme
- Country: Estonia
- County: Lääne County
- Parish: Lääne-Nigula Parish
- Time zone: UTC+2 (EET)
  - Summer (DST): UTC+3 (EEST)

Nõmme is a village in Lääne-Nigula Parish, Lääne County, in western Estonia.

== Name ==
Nõmme was attested in historical sources as Немме in 1900. The name comes from the common noun nõmm (genitive: nõmme) 'heath, moor, moorland', referring to the local geography.
