= Kedre =

Village in Estonia

Coordinates: 58°57′N 23°48′E

- Village
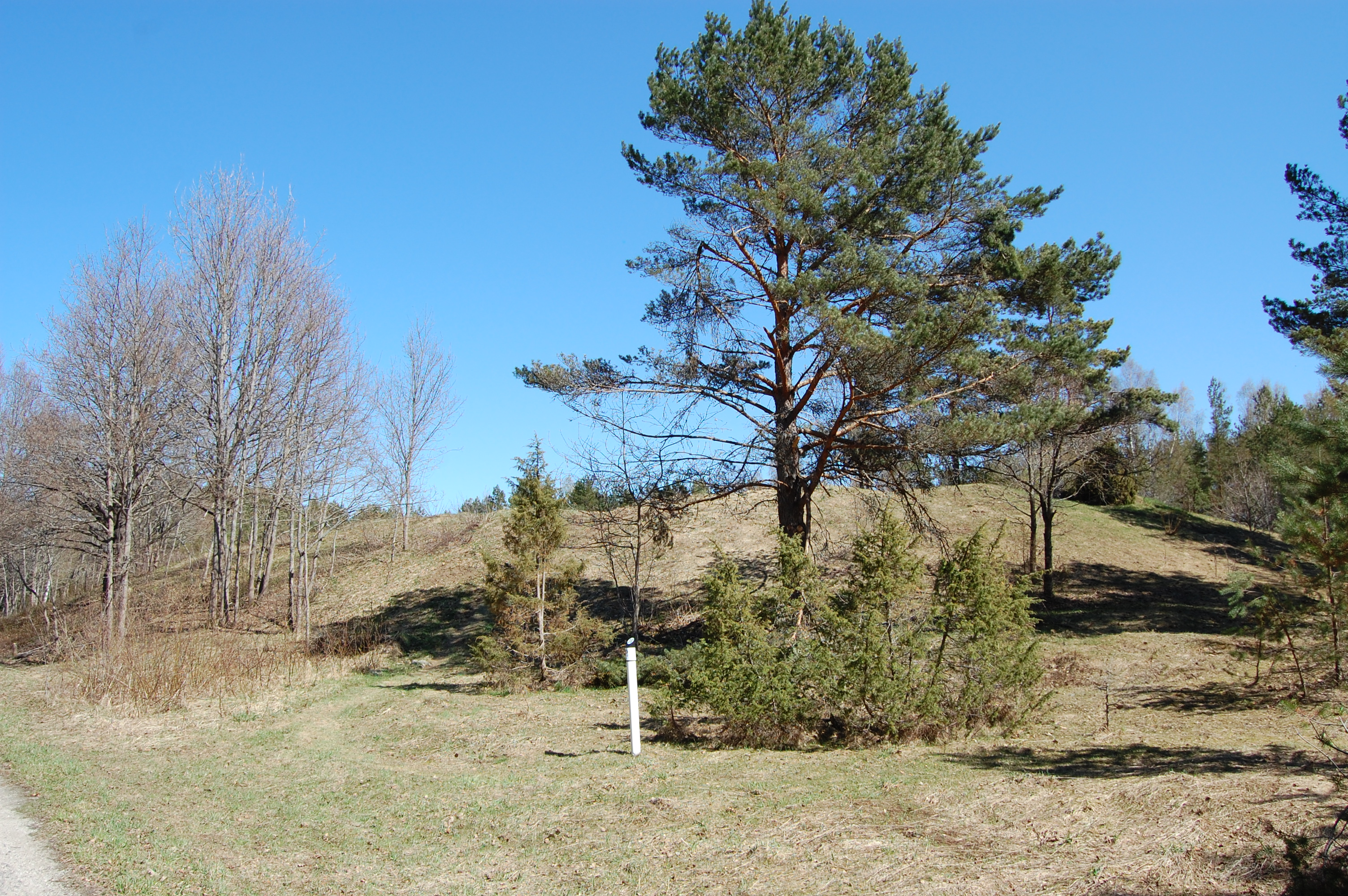
- Kedre Linnamägi
- Interactive map of Kedre
- Country: Estonia
- County: Lääne County
- Parish: Lääne-Nigula Parish
- Time zone: UTC+2 (EET)
  - Summer (DST): UTC+3 (EEST)

Kedre is a village in Lääne-Nigula Parish, Lääne County, in western Estonia.
