= Turvalepa =

Village in Estonia

Coordinates: 58°57′N 23°50′E

- Village
- Interactive map of Turvalepa
- Country: Estonia
- County: Lääne County
- Parish: Lääne-Nigula Parish
- Time zone: UTC+2 (EET)
  - Summer (DST): UTC+3 (EEST)

Turvalepa is a village in Lääne-Nigula Parish, Lääne County, in western Estonia.

== Name ==
Turvalepa was attested in historical sources as Türpleppe and Turpplepp in 1591, Turpeläp in 1598, Turpalep by in 1689, and Turbalep in 1798. The name is a compound of turba (genitive of turvas 'peat') + lõpp 'end'; that is, 'peat area'. The nearby Turvalepa Bog has rich peat deposits.
