= Kuijõe =

Village in Estonia

Coordinates: 59°04′58″N 23°59′20″E

- Village
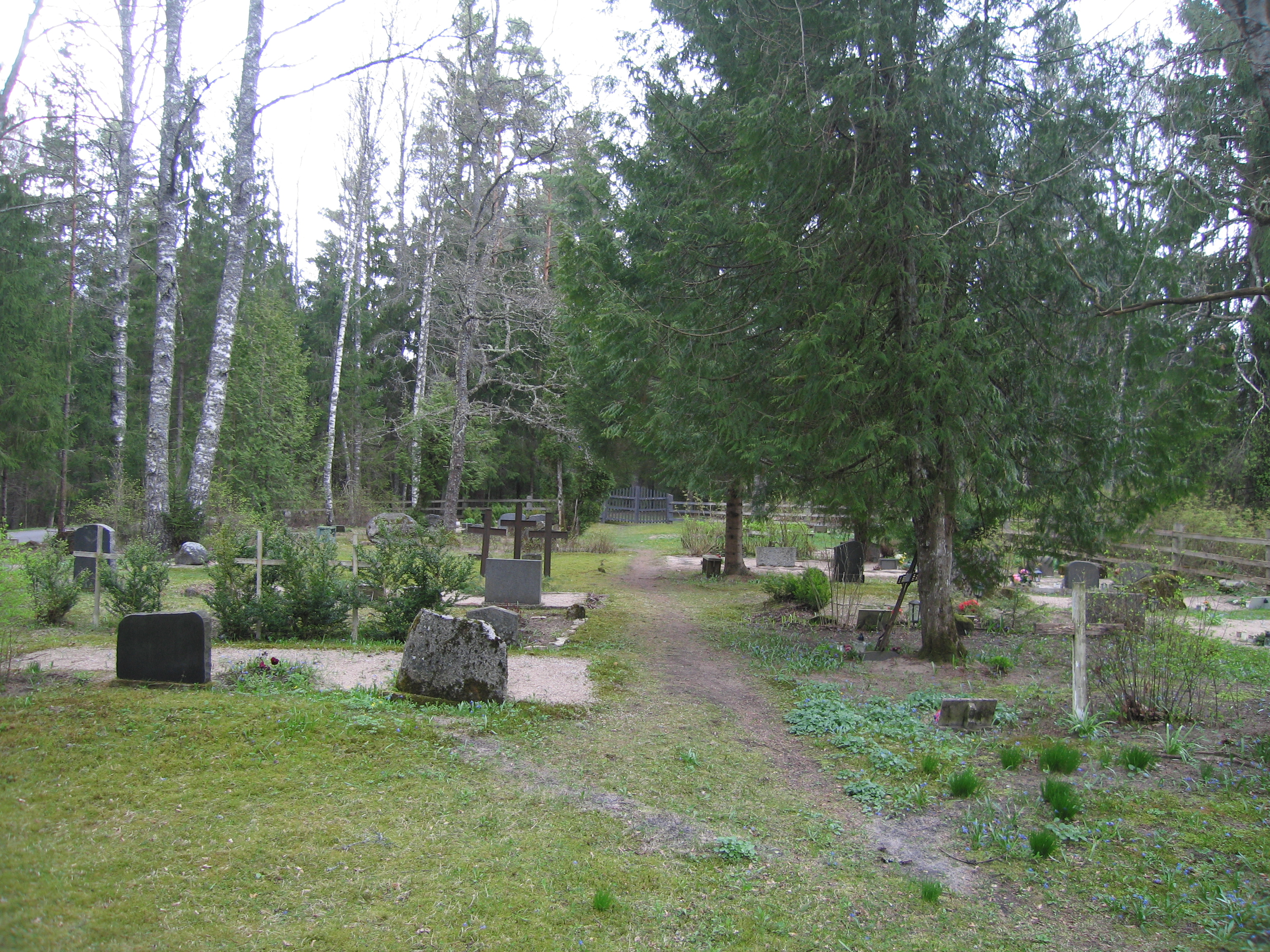
- Kuijõe cemetery
- Interactive map of Kuijõe
- Country: Estonia
- County: Lääne County
- Parish: Lääne-Nigula Parish
- Time zone: UTC+2 (EET)
  - Summer (DST): UTC+3 (EEST)

Kuijõe (German: Kuijöggi) is a village in Lääne-Nigula Parish, Lääne County, in western Estonia.
