= Niibi =

Village in Estonia

Coordinates: 59°02′28″N 23°39′41″E

- Village
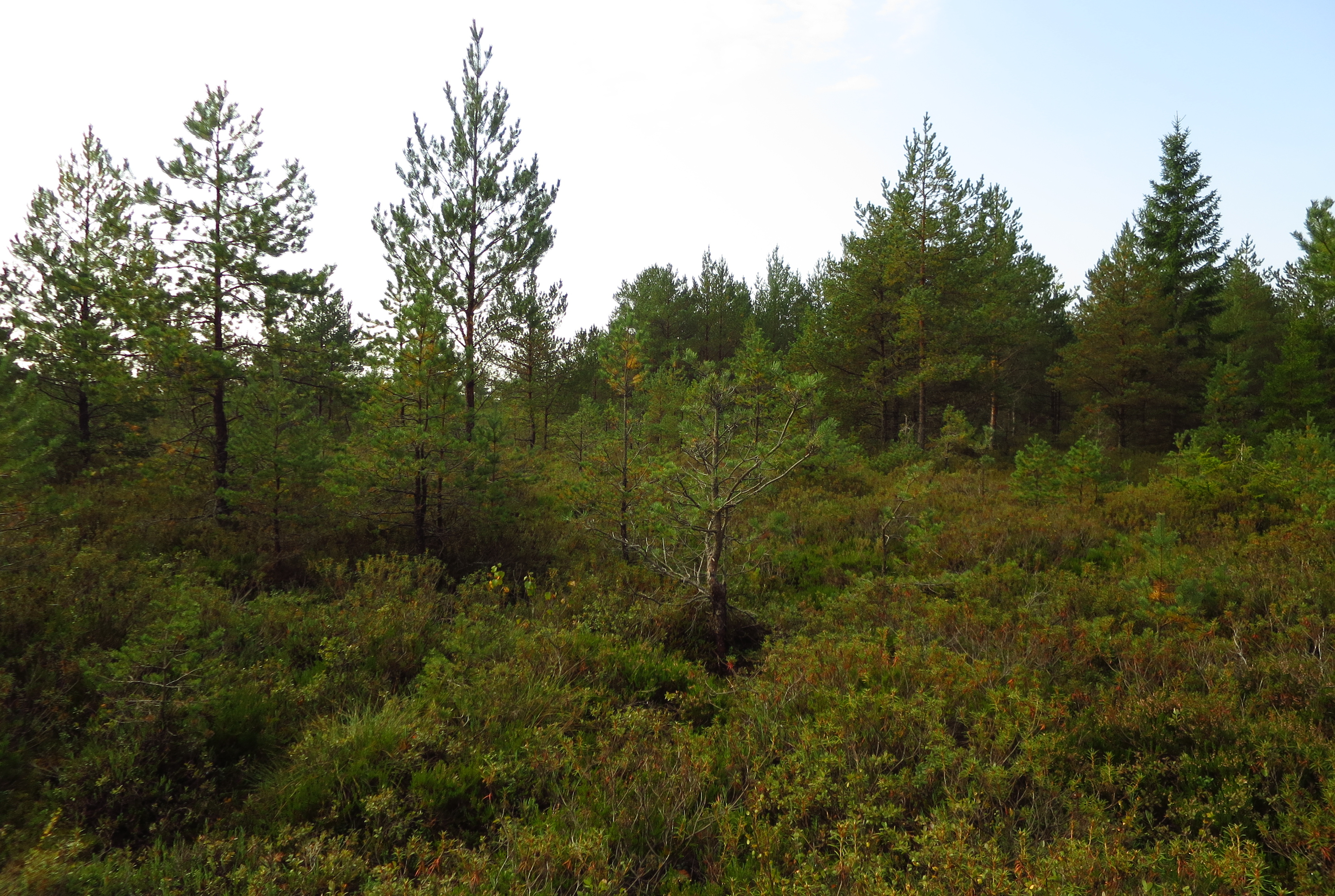
- Niibi bog
- Interactive map of Niibi
- Country: Estonia
- County: Lääne County
- Parish: Lääne-Nigula Parish
- Time zone: UTC+2 (EET)
  - Summer (DST): UTC+3 (EEST)

Niibi is a village in Lääne-Nigula Parish, Lääne County, in western Estonia.
