= Martna =

Village in Estonia

Coordinates: 58°51′N 23°48′E

- Village
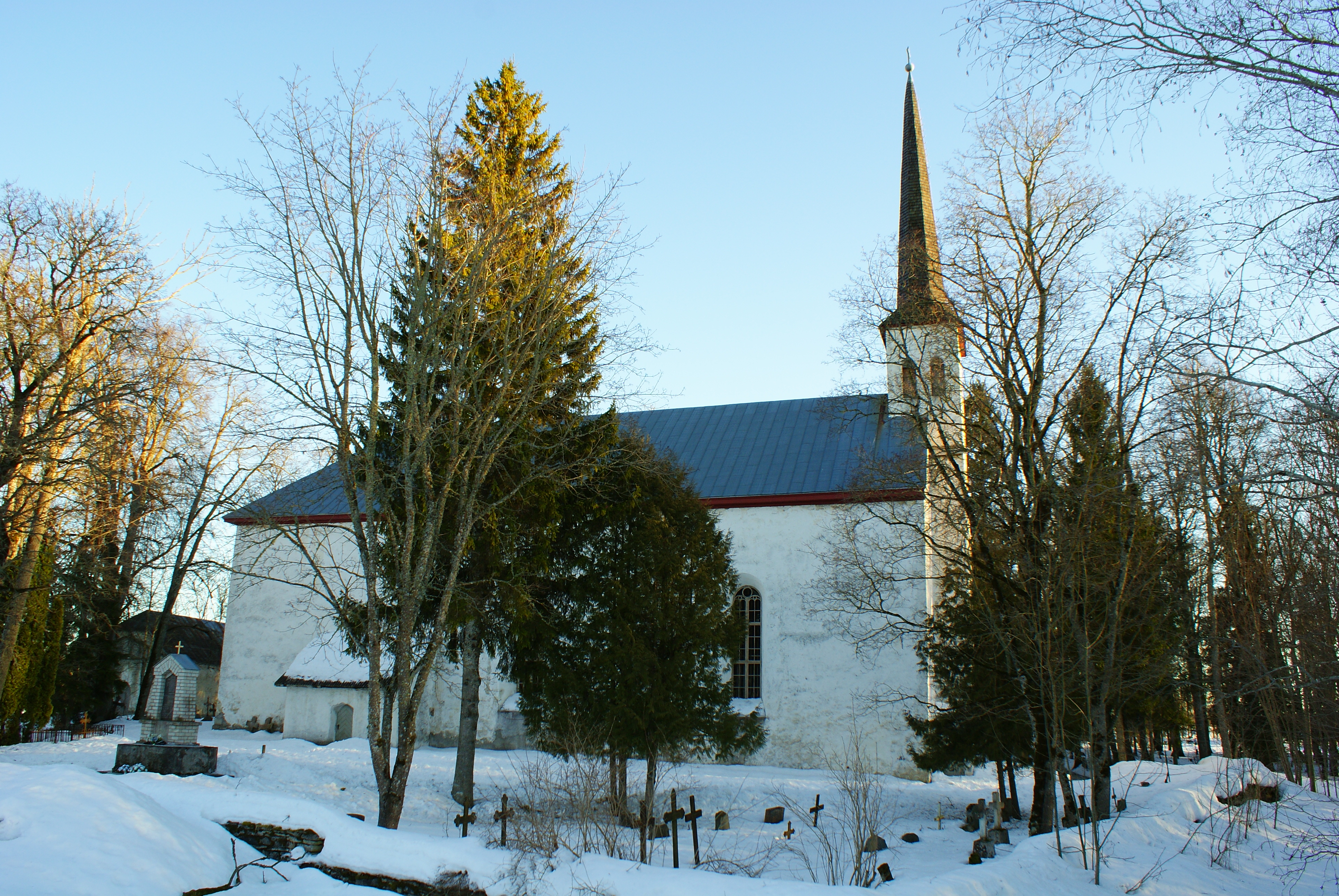
- Martna church
- Interactive map of Martna
- Country: Estonia
- County: Lääne County
- Parish: Lääne-Nigula Parish
- Time zone: UTC+2 (EET)
  - Summer (DST): UTC+3 (EEST)

Martna is a village in Lääne-Nigula Parish Lääne County western Estonia. It was the administrative centre of Martna Parish.
