= Väike-Lähtru =

Village in Estonia

Coordinates: 58°54′52″N 23°53′58″E

- Village
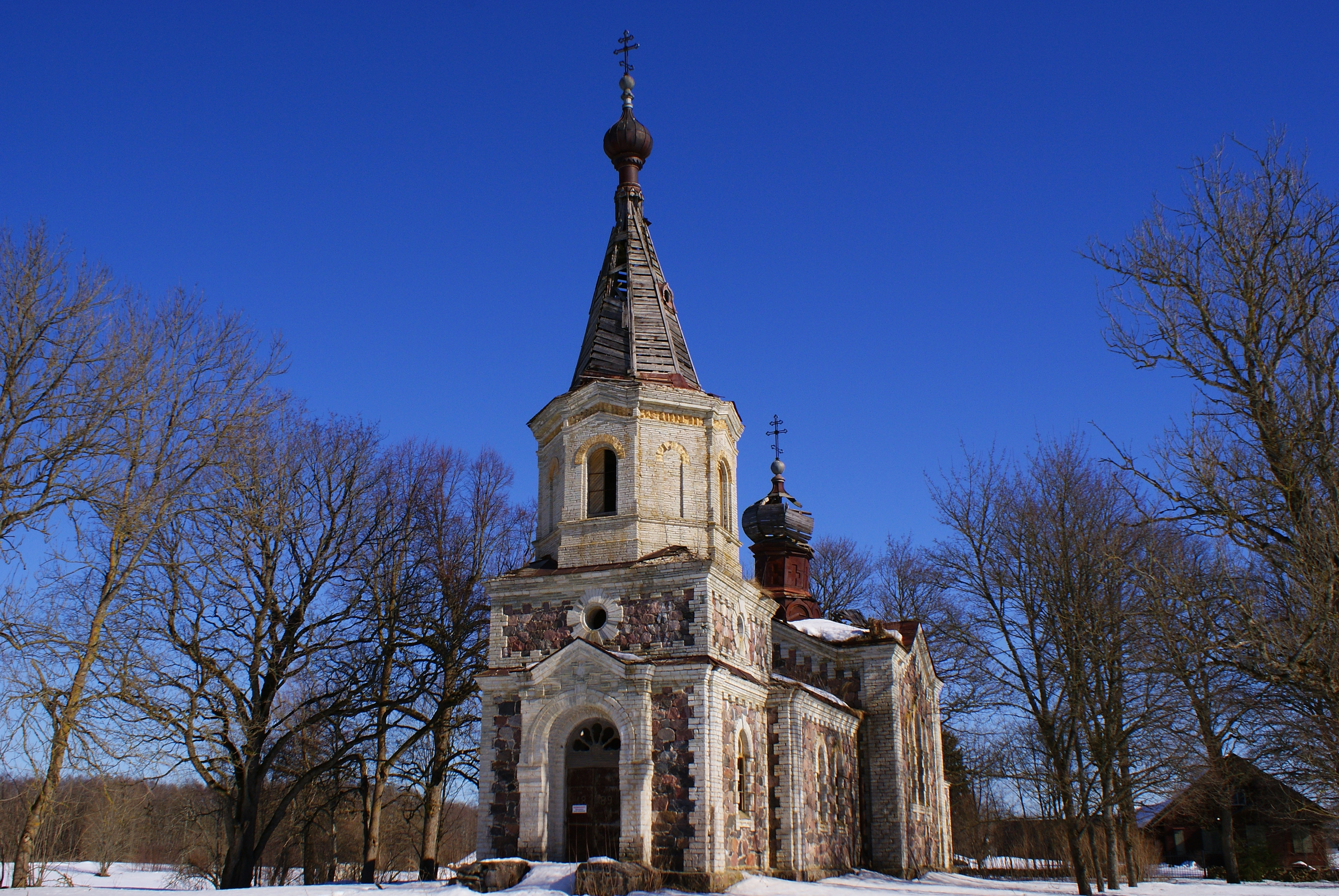
- Interactive map of Väike-Lähtru
- Country: Estonia
- County: Lääne
- Parish: Lääne-Nigula
- Time zone: UTC+2 (EET)
  - Summer (DST): UTC+3 (EEST)

Väike-Lähtru (German: Klein-Lechtigall) is a village in Lääne-Nigula Parish, Lääne County, in western Estonia.
