= Vanaküla, Lääne-Nigula Parish =

Village in Estonia

Coordinates: 58°54′05″N 23°54′12″E

Vanaküla
- Village
- Interactive map of Vanaküla
- Country: Estonia
- County: Lääne County
- Parish: Lääne-Nigula Parish
- Time zone: UTC+2 (EET)
  - Summer (DST): UTC+3 (EEST)

Vanaküla is a village in Lääne-Nigula Parish, Lääne County, in western Estonia.

== Name ==
Vanaküla was attested in written sources as Alten dorff in 1687, Alte Dorff Lechtigal in 1726, and Wan̄akülla in 1798. The name literally means 'old village'. Semantically, it is paired with neighboring Uusküla (literally, 'new village') 1 kilometer (0.62 mi) to the southeast.
