= Uusküla, Lääne County =

Village in Estonia

Coordinates: 58°53′43″N 23°55′31″E

Uusküla
- Village
- Interactive map of Uusküla
- Country: Estonia
- County: Lääne County
- Parish: Lääne-Nigula Parish
- Time zone: UTC+2 (EET)
  - Summer (DST): UTC+3 (EEST)

Uusküla is a village in Lääne-Nigula Parish, Lääne County, in western Estonia.

== Name ==
Uusküla was attested in written sources as Neue Dorff Lechtigal in 1726 and Uekülla in 1798. The name literally means 'new village'. Semantically, it is paired with neighboring Vanaküla (literally, 'old village') 1 kilometer (0.62 mi) to the northwest.
