= Liivaküla, Lääne-Nigula Parish =

Village in Estonia

Coordinates: 58°49′19″N 23°44′57″E

Liivaküla
- Village
- Interactive map of Liivaküla
- Country: Estonia
- County: Lääne County
- Parish: Lääne-Nigula Parish
- Time zone: UTC+2 (EET)
  - Summer (DST): UTC+3 (EEST)

Liivaküla is a village in Lääne-Nigula Parish, Lääne County, in western Estonia.
