= Onga =

Onga may refer to:

- Onga District, Fukuoka, a district of Fukuoka Prefecture, Japan
  - Onga, Fukuoka, a town in that district
- Onga, Hungary, a town
- Onga, Gabon, in the department of Djoue

== See also ==
- Oonga (disambiguation)
- Ounga (disambiguation)
- Ongaonga (disambiguation)
