= Laiküla =

Village in Estonia

Coordinates: 58°46′N 23°59′E

- Village
- Interactive map of Laiküla
- Country: Estonia
- County: Lääne County
- Parish: Lääne-Nigula Parish

Population
  - Total: 15
- Time zone: UTC+2 (EET)
  - Summer (DST): UTC+3 (EEST)

Laiküla (German: Layküll) is a village in Lääne-Nigula Parish, Lääne County, in western Estonia.
