= Ongaonga =

Ongaonga and may refer to:

- Ongaonga, New Zealand, a township in New Zealand
- Urtica ferox, a native tree nettle from New Zealand
- Te Uri Ongaonga, part of the Eastern Bay of Islands, Ngāpuhi, New Zealand

== See also ==
- Onga (disambiguation)
