= Tammiku, Lääne-Nigula Parish =

Village in Estonia

Coordinates: 58°47′44″N 23°51′47″E

Tammiku
- Village
- Interactive map of Tammiku
- Country: Estonia
- County: Lääne County
- Parish: Lääne-Nigula Parish
- Time zone: UTC+2 (EET)
  - Summer (DST): UTC+3 (EEST)

Tammiku is a village in Lääne-Nigula Parish, Lääne County, in western Estonia.

== Name ==
Tammiku appears in written records in 1795 as farm-name modifiers in Tam̄iko Andrus and Tam̄iko Tönnis, referring two men that lived in the village, which was previously known as Nurme (attested as Nurms in 1689). The name Nurme was later replaced by the farm name Tammiku. The name (in the genitive case) comes from the common noun tammik 'oak forest', referring to the local vegetation.
