= Oonga =

Ooonga may refer to:

- Oonga (film), an Indian film
- Oonga, Estonia, a village
- Motu Oonga, an island in Kiribati

== See also ==
- Ounga (disambiguation)
- Onga (disambiguation)
