= Rõuma =

Village in Estonia

- Village
- Location within Estonia
- Coordinates: 58°59′16″N 24°03′15″E
- Country: Estonia
- County: Lääne County
- Parish: Lääne-Nigula Parish
- Time zone: UTC+2 (EET)
  - Summer (DST): UTC+3 (EEST)

Rõuma is a village in Lääne-Nigula Parish, Lääne County, in western Estonia.
