= Palivere =

Borough in Estonia

- Location within Estonia
- Coordinates: 58°58′13″N 23°54′12″E
- Country: Estonia
- County: Lääne County
- Parish: Lääne-Nigula Parish
- Time zone: UTC+2 (EET)

Palivere is a small borough (alevik) in Lääne-Nigula Parish, Lääne County in western Estonia. The number of inhabitants is 677 people.

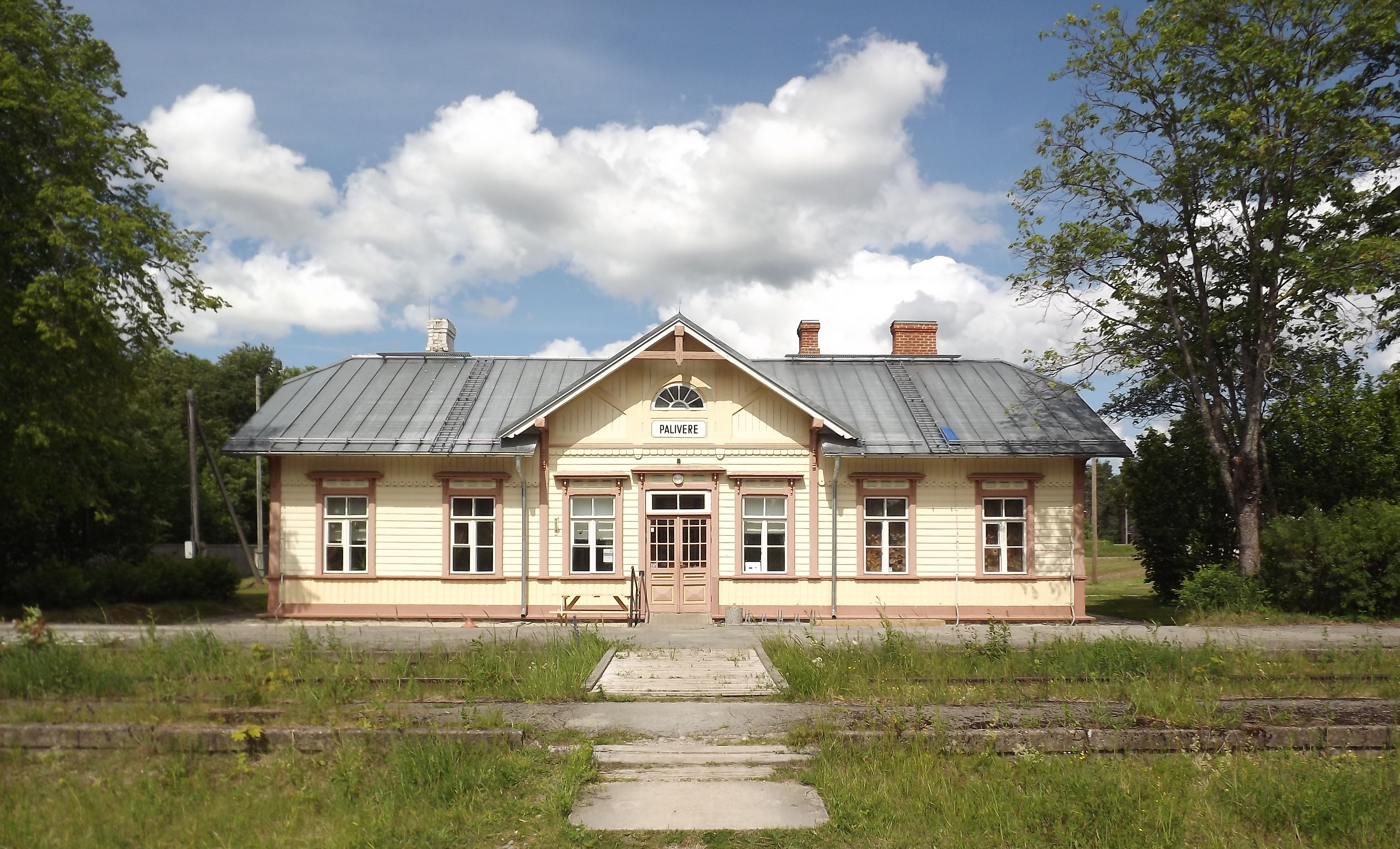
Former railway station

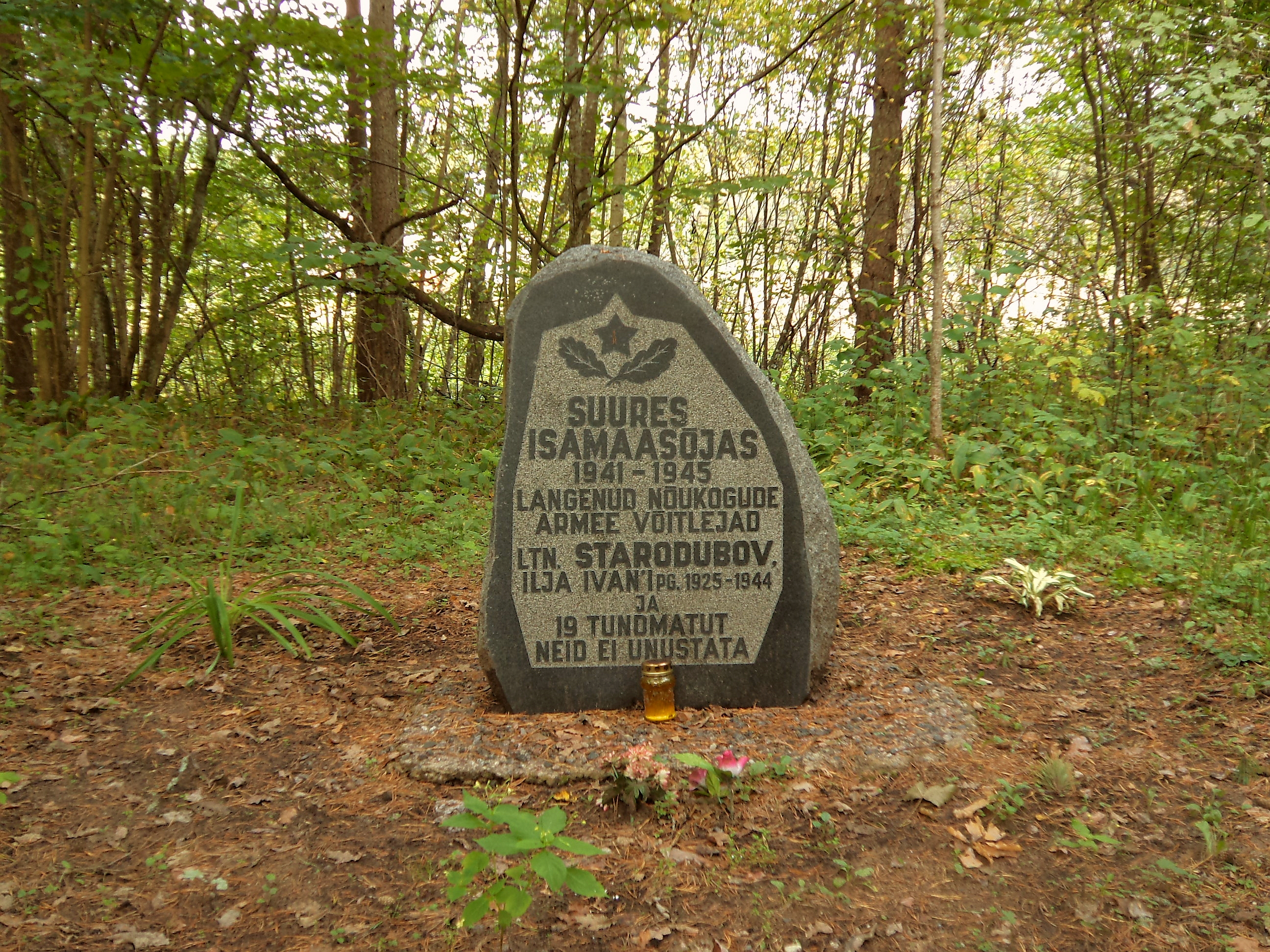
Mass grave of people killed in World War II

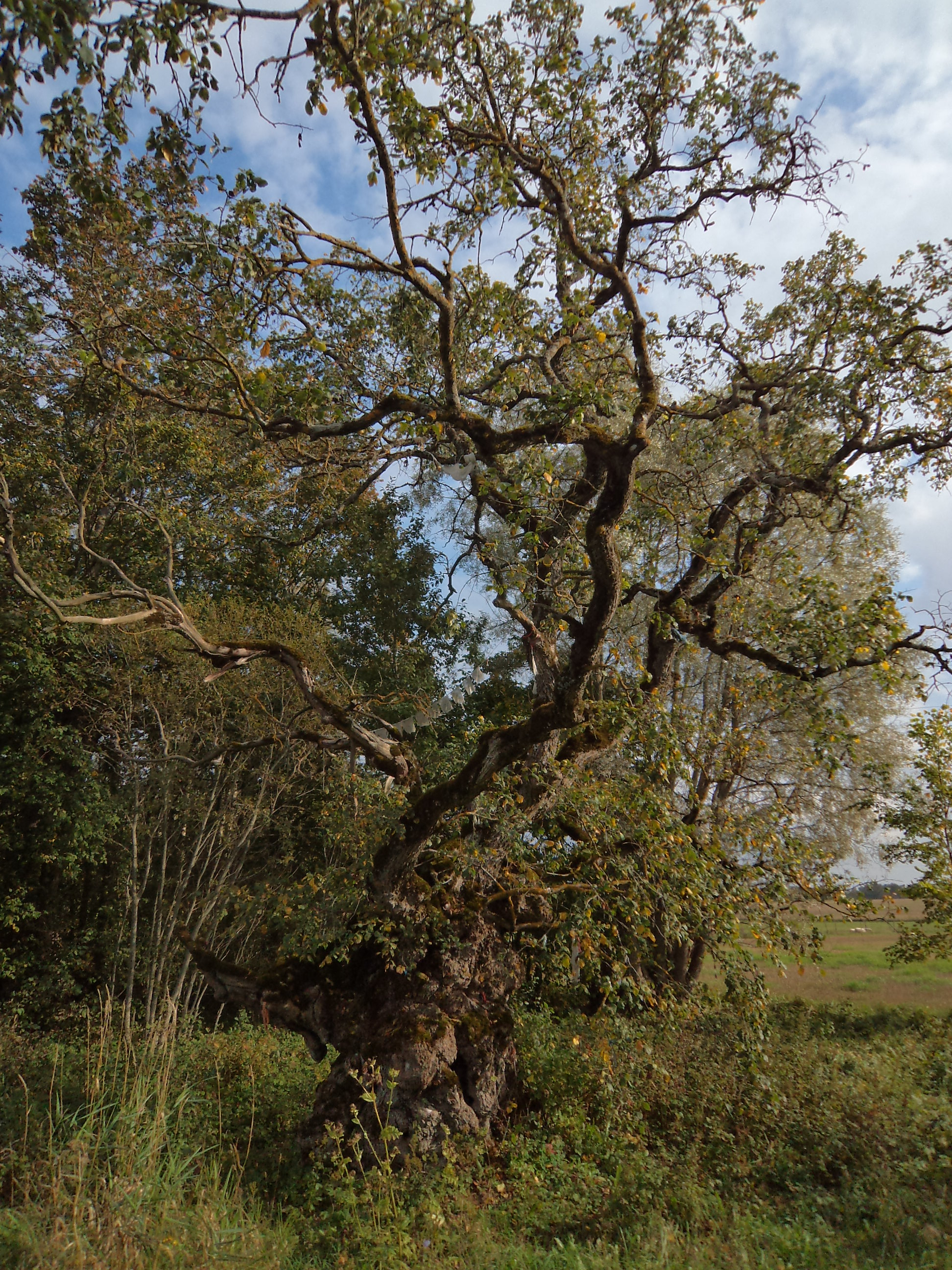
