= Kesu, Rapla County =

Village in Estonia

Coordinates: 58°43′26″N 24°16′07″E

Kesu
- Village
- Interactive map of Kesu
- Country: Estonia
- County: Rapla County
- Parish: Märjamaa Parish
- Time zone: UTC+2 (EET)
  - Summer (DST): UTC+3 (EEST)

Kesu is a village in Märjamaa Parish, Rapla County in western Estonia.
