= Arno Suurorg =

Estonian actor and producer (1903–1960)

- Born: Arnold Friedrich Grossthal; 18 July 1903; Piirsalu, Governorate of Estonia, Russian Empire
- Died: 3 January 1960 (aged 56); Tallinn, then part of Estonian SSR, Soviet Union
- Occupation: Actor
- Years active: 1922–1960

Arno Suurorg (born Arnold Friedrich Grossthal; 18 July 1903 – 3 January 1960) was an Estonian stage, film and radio actor and producer whose career spanned nearly forty years.

== Biography ==
=== Early life ===
Suurorg was born in Piirsalu, he was the eldest of two children born to Jüri Grossthal and Maria Hansen; his younger sister Helmi was born in 1908. The family would later change their surname to the more Estonian Suurorg when the children were young. His mother Maria was the younger sister of writer A. H. Tammsaare, whose pentalogy Truth and Justice is considered one of the major works of 20th-century Estonian literature.

=== Career ===
Beginning in 1922, Suurorg would spend nearly forty years performing at the Estonian Drama Theatre and would also produce a number of plays at the theatre. He would also appear in a number of radio plays.

Aside from theatre and radio, Suurorg appeared in a number of films. He made his film debut in the 1955 Estonian drama Jahid merel (English: Yachts at Sea); followed by the Herbert Rappaport directed Andruse õnn the same year. His most prominent film role was that of the character Lindkvist in the 1959 drama Veealused karid, based on the Aadu Hint-penned play Kuhu lähed, seltsimees direktor?.

=== Death ===
Arno Suurorg died on 3 January 1960 in Tallinn at age 56.

=== Acknowledgements ===
In 1946, Arno Suurorg was awarded the Merited Artist of the Estonian SSR.
