= Oonga, Estonia =

Village in Estonia

Coordinates: 58°49′N 23°44′E

Oonga
- Village
- Interactive map of Oonga
- Country: Estonia
- County: Lääne County
- Parish: Lääne-Nigula Parish
- Time zone: UTC+2 (EET)
  - Summer (DST): UTC+3 (EEST)

Oonga is a village in Lääne-Nigula Parish, Lääne County, in western Estonia.
