= Tuka (surname) =

Tuka (Tuca) (also found as 'Tucha') is a surname and family name.

Origin: The surname is originally Slovak-Rusyn and Hungarian.

Mostly found in: Romania, Moldova, Hungary, Ukraine (Zakarpattia) and Slovakia.

Notable people (majority of Slavic origin) with the surname include:

- Amel Tuka (born 1991), Bosnian middle-distance runner
- George Tuka (born 1963), Ukrainian/Russian politician and activist
- Mirsad Tuka (1965–2023), Bosnian actor
- Vojtech Tuka (1880–1946), Slovak politician
