= Nigula, Lääne County =

Village in Estonia

Coordinates: 58°58′01″N 23°46′27″E

Nigula
- Village
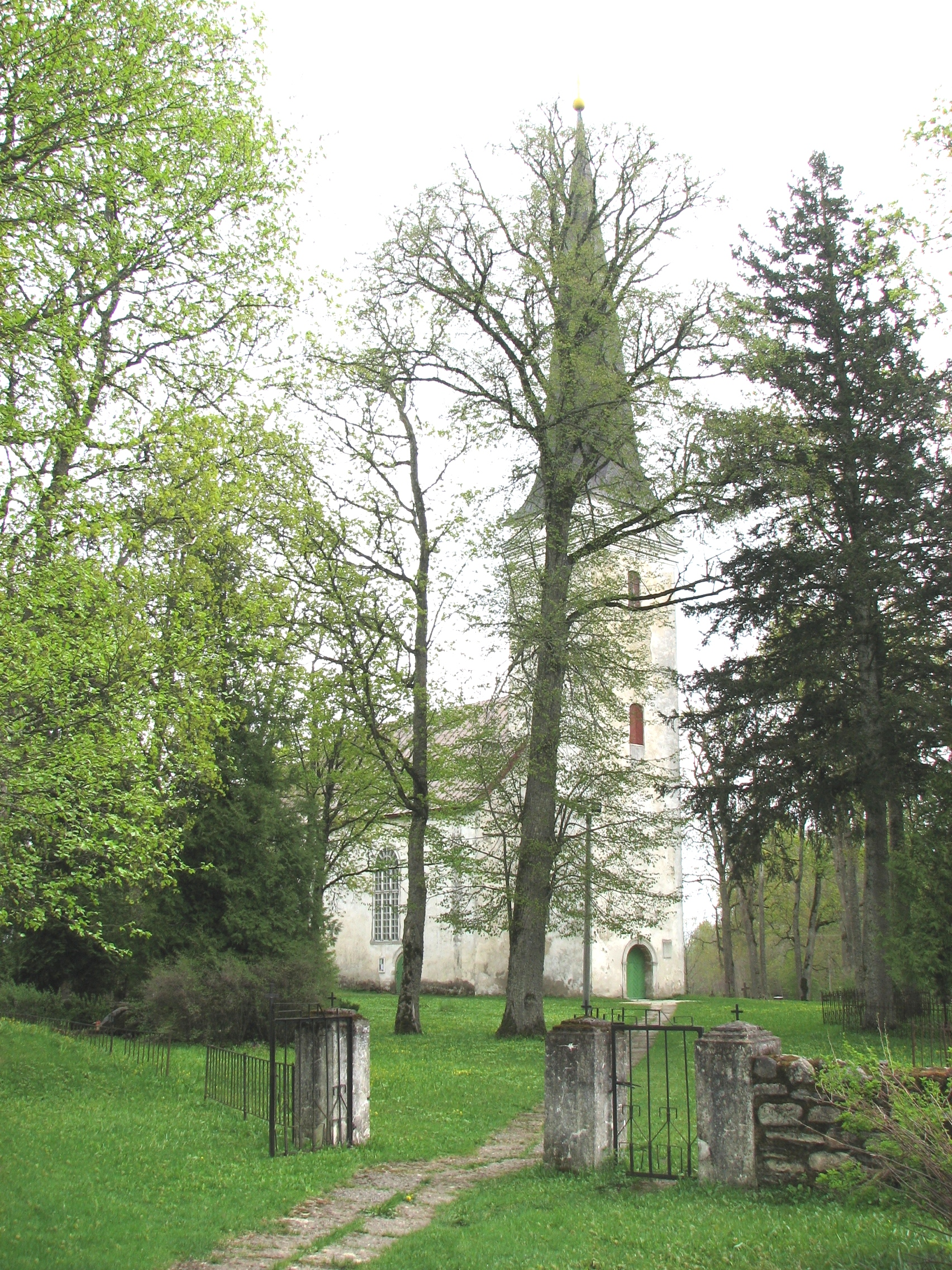
- Lääne-Nigula church in Nigula
- Interactive map of Nigula
- Country: Estonia
- County: Lääne County
- Parish: Lääne-Nigula Parish
- Time zone: UTC+2 (EET)
  - Summer (DST): UTC+3 (EEST)

Nigula is a village in Lääne-Nigula Parish, Lääne County, in western Estonia.
