= Putkaste, Lääne County =

Village in Estonia

Coordinates: 58°50′43″N 23°49′02″E

Putkaste
- Village
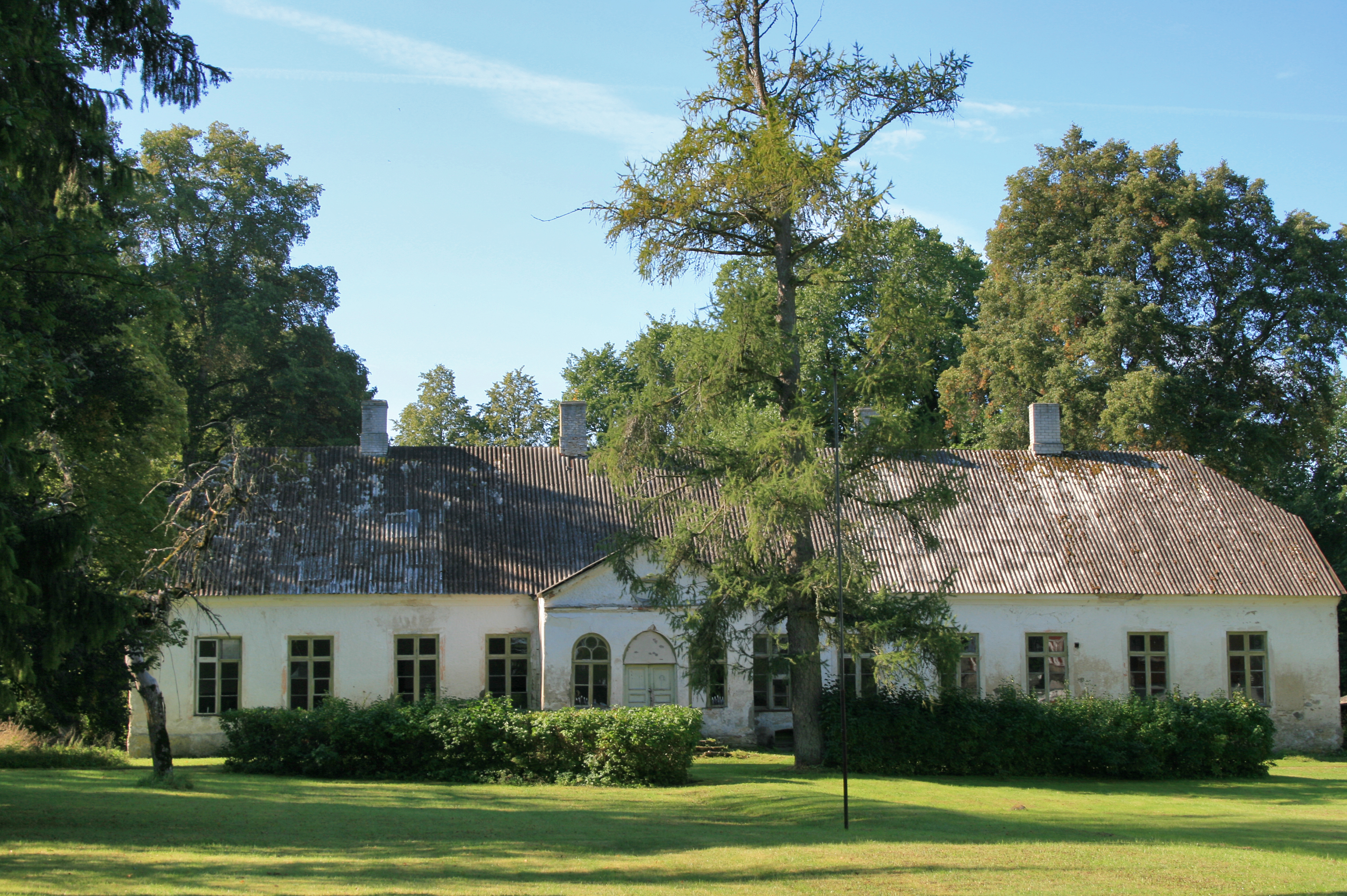
- Putkaste manor house
- Interactive map of Putkaste
- Country: Estonia
- County: Lääne County
- Parish: Lääne-Nigula Parish
- Time zone: UTC+2 (EET)
  - Summer (DST): UTC+3 (EEST)

Putkaste (German: Putkas) is a village in Lääne-Nigula Parish, Lääne County, in western Estonia.
