= Kesu, Lääne County =

Village in Estonia

Coordinates: 58°52′43″N 23°42′08″E

Kesu
- Village
- Interactive map of Kesu
- Country: Estonia
- County: Lääne County
- Parish: Lääne-Nigula Parish
- Time zone: UTC+2 (EET)
  - Summer (DST): UTC+3 (EEST)

Kesu is a village in Lääne-Nigula Parish, Lääne County, in western Estonia.
