= Saunja, Lääne County =

Village in Estonia

Coordinates: 58°59′N 23°39′E

Saunja
- Village
- Interactive map of Saunja
- Country: Estonia
- County: Lääne County
- Parish: Lääne-Nigula Parish
- Time zone: UTC+2 (EET)
  - Summer (DST): UTC+3 (EEST)

Saunja is a village in Lääne-Nigula Parish, Lääne County in western Estonia.
