= Ounga =

Ounga may refer to:

- Ounga, Tunisia, an archaeological site in Tunisia
- Ounga, Alaska, a ghost town in Alaska, United States

== See also ==
- Oonga (disambiguation)
- Unga (disambiguation)
