= Lääne-Nigula Parish =

Municipality of Estonia

Coordinates: 58°57′14″N 23°45′08″E

Lääne-Nigula Estonian: Lääne-Nigula linn
- Municipality of Estonia
- Flag Coat of arms

- Country: Estonia
- County: Lääne County
- Administrative centre: Taebla

Government
  - Mayor: Janno Randmaa

Area
  - Total: 1,449 km^{2} (559 sq mi)

Population (2026)
  - Total: 6,907
  - Density: 4.767/km^{2} (12.35/sq mi)
- ISO 3166 code: EE-441
- Website: Official website

Lääne-Nigula Parish (Estonian: Lääne-Nigula vald) is a rural municipality of Estonia, in Lääne County. It has a population of 6907 (as of 1 January 2026) and an area of 1,449 km^{2} (559 sq mi). The population density was 4.8/km^{2} (12.3/sq mi).

Lääne-Nigula Parish was established by merging Oru, Risti, and Taebla parishes after the municipal elections held on 20 October 2013. In 2017, the former municipalities Noarootsi, Nõva, Kullamaa and Martna were also merged into Lääne-Nigula.

== Politics ==
There are 17 seats in the local government council. The government of the parish is located in Taebla.

== Demographics ==
As of 1 January 2026, the parish had 6,907 residents, of which 3,462 (50.1%) were women and 3,445 (49.9%) were men.

=== Religion ===
Among residents of the parish above 15 years of age, 12.0 per cent declared themselves to be Lutheran, 2.4 per cent to be Orthodox, and 2.8 per cent to be Baptist. The majority of residents of the parish, 80.1 per cent, were religiously unaffiliated. 2.7 per cent of the population followed other religions or did not specify their religious affiliation.

== Gallery ==
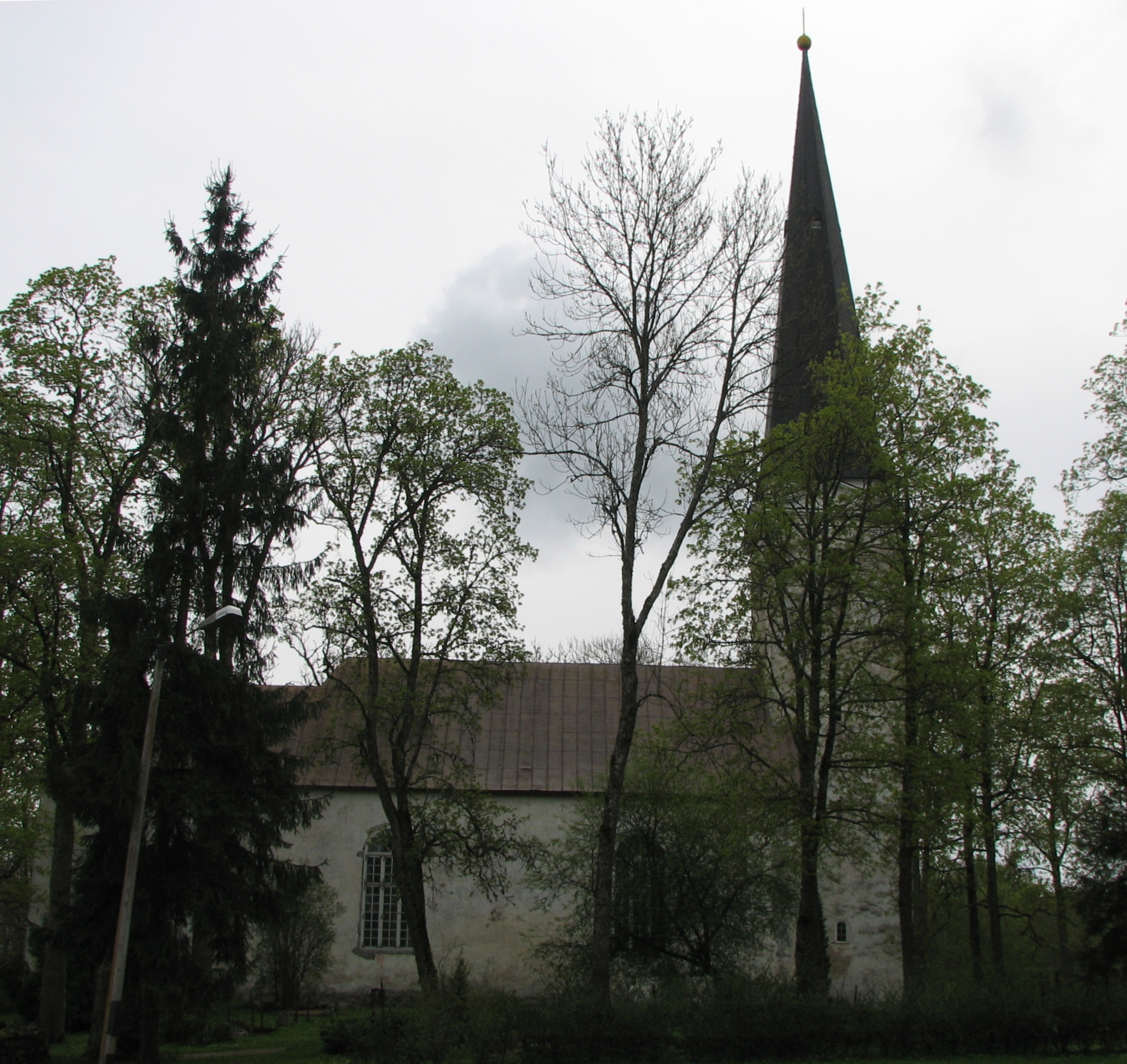
Lääne-Nigula church from the 13th/18th century in Nigula village.

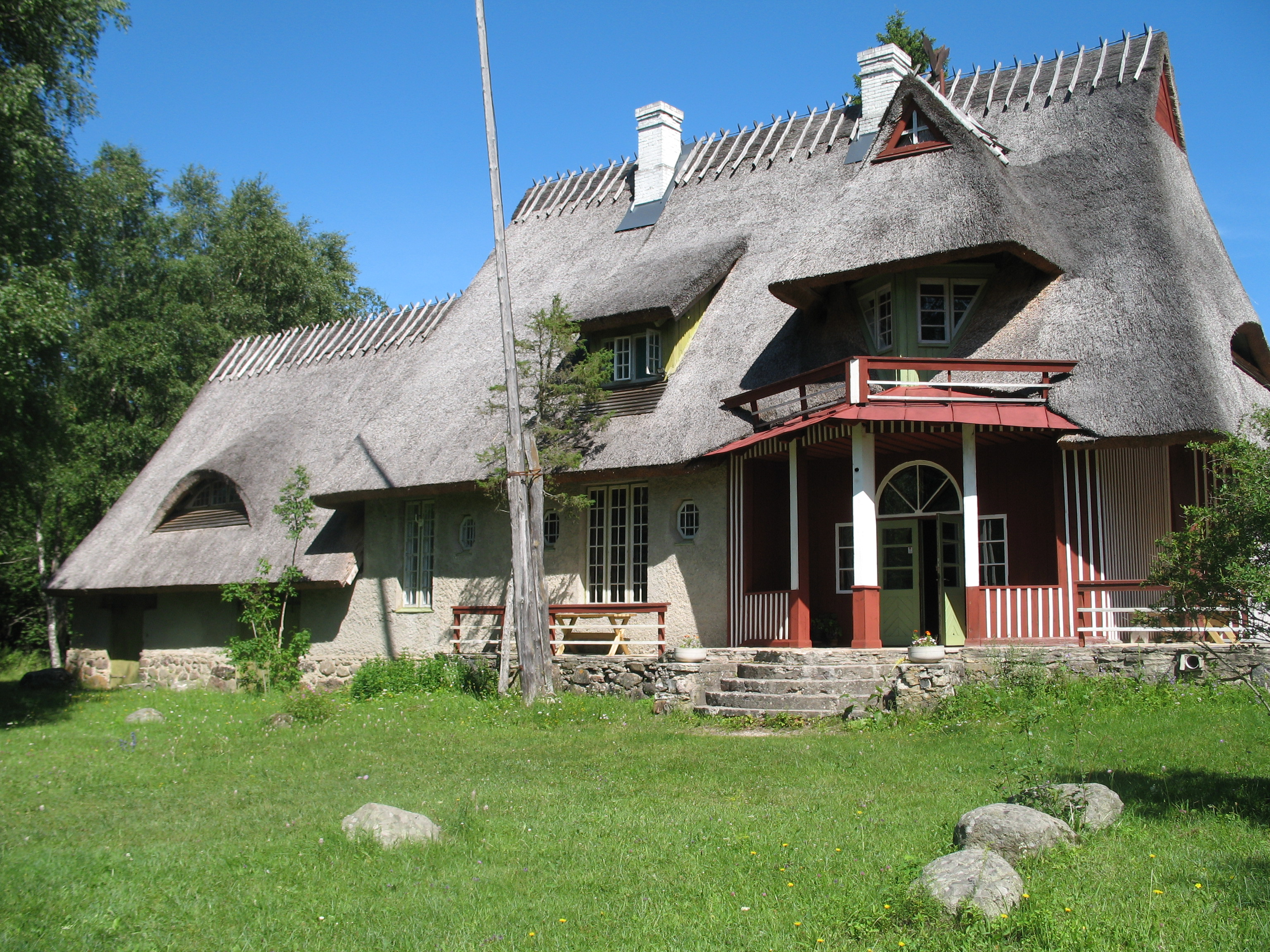
House museum of painter Ants Laikmaa in Kadarpiku village.

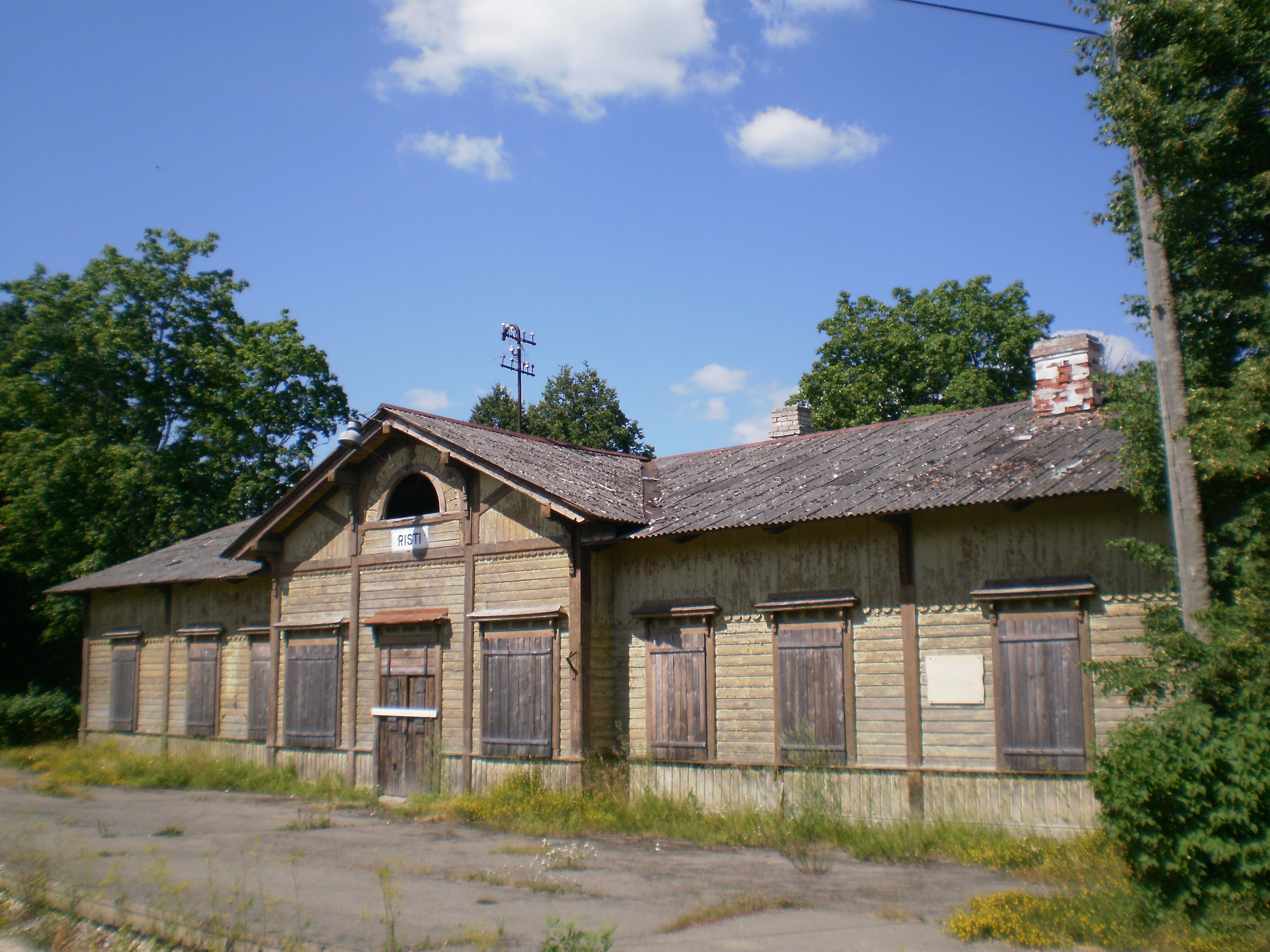
Former Risti railway station

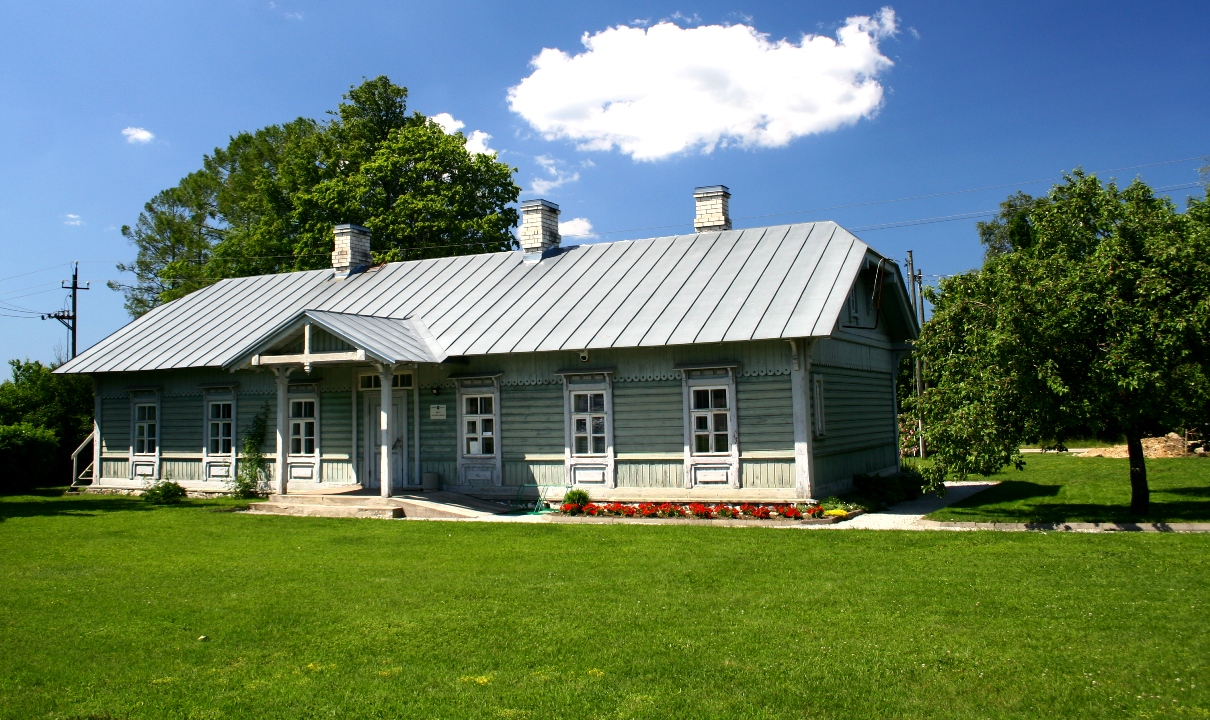
Risti library

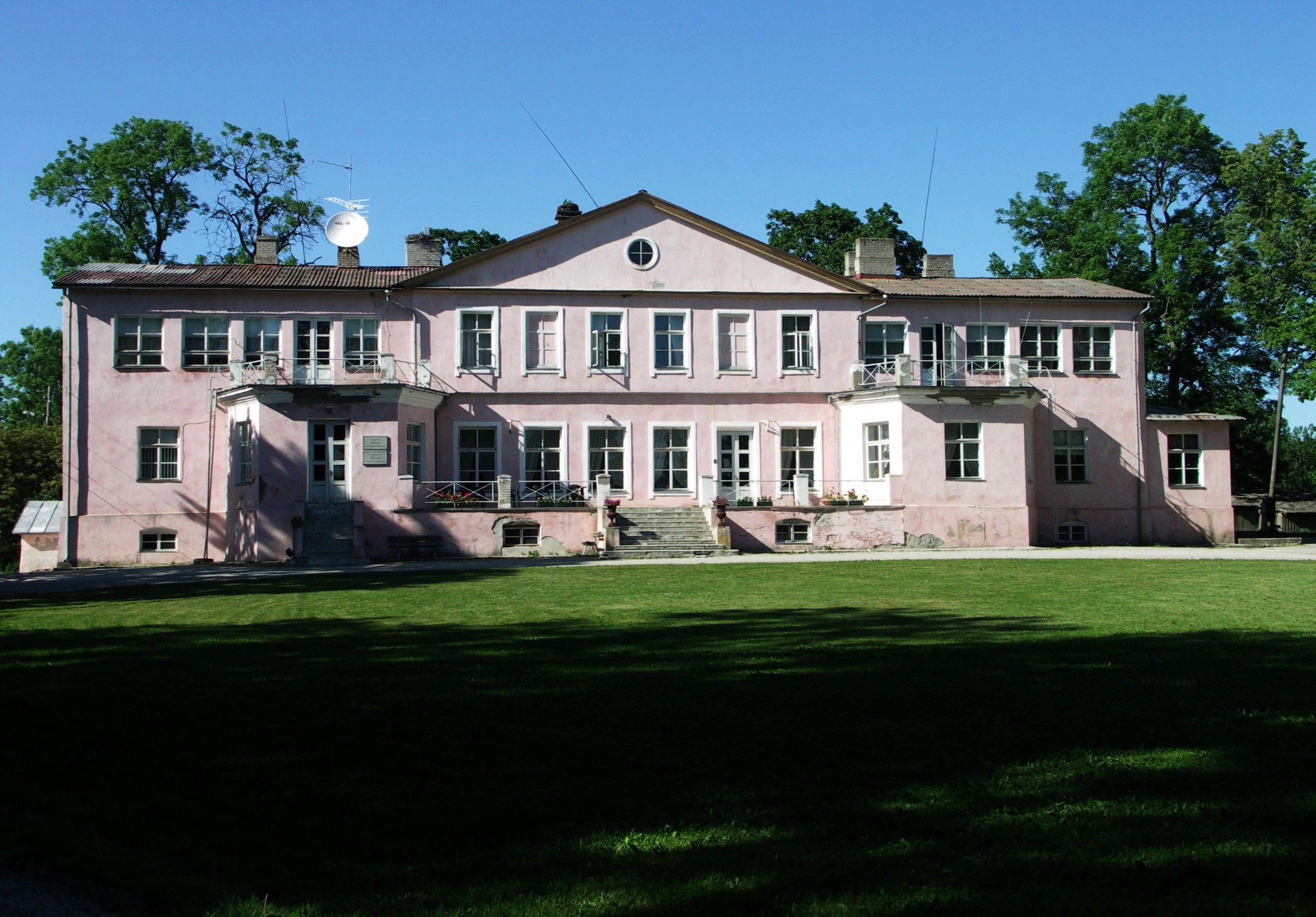
Palivere Manor

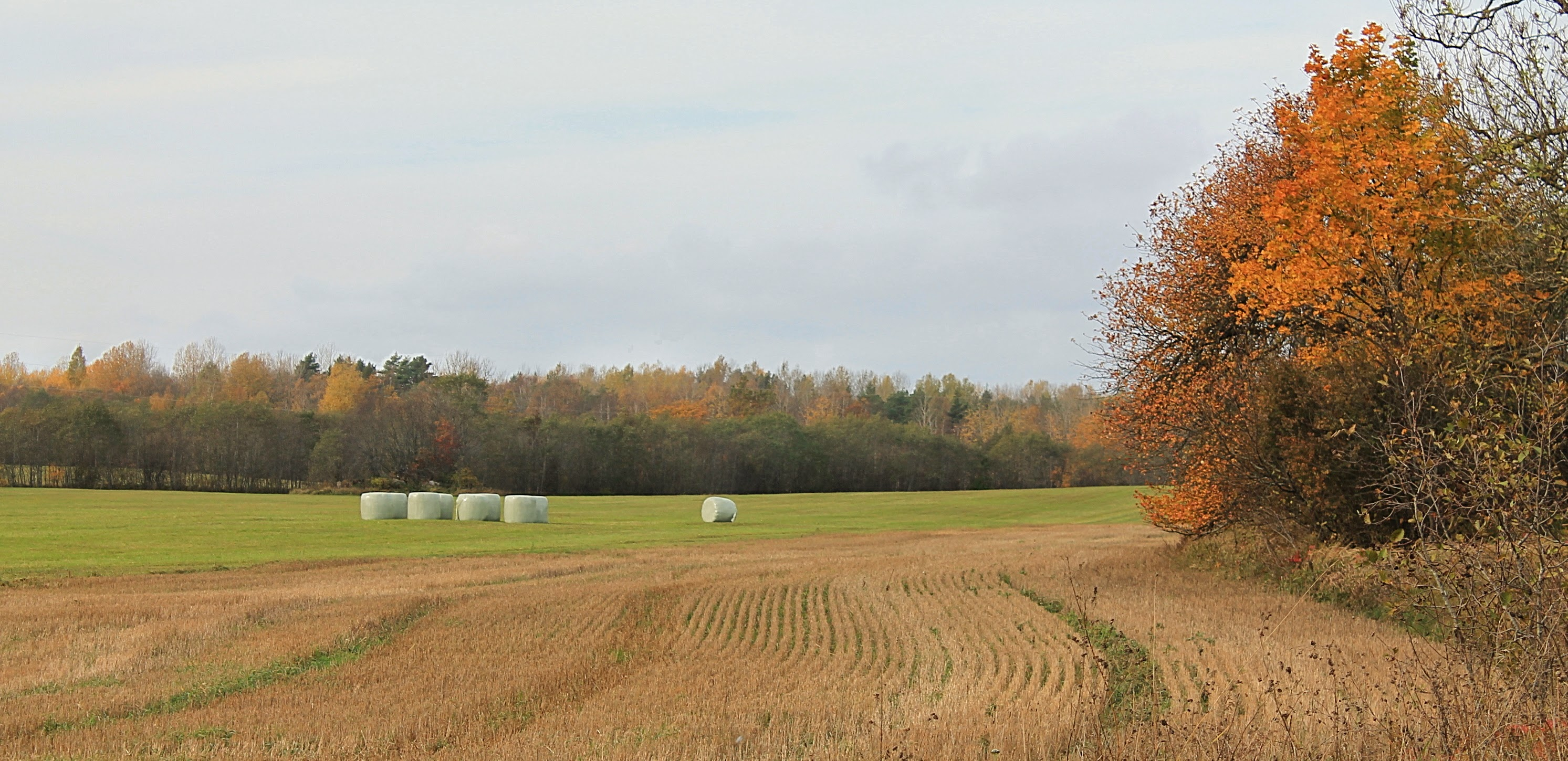
Lääne-Nigula farmland

== Notable people ==
- Friedrich von Löwen (1654 – 1744), a Baltic German military statesman and Governor of Governorate of Estonia, 1728–1736
- Otto Wilhelm von Essen (1761– 1834), a Baltic German Russian military statesman and Governor of Governorate of Estonia, 1832–1833
- Karl Wilhelm von Toll (1777 in Keskvere – 1842), a Baltic German aristocrat who served in the Imperial Russian Army
- Hans Pöhl (1876 in Suur-Nõmmküla – 1930), politician, Minister of Swedish-minority Affairs, 1918/1919
- Aleksander Veidermann (1888 in Üdruma – 1972), politician, Minister of Education, 1922-1923
- Arno Suurorg (born 1903 in Piirsalu – 1960), stage, film and radio actor and producer
- Edvin Vesterby (born 1927 in Riguldi), bantamweight Greco-Roman wrestler and silver medallist at the 1956 Summer Olympics.
- Sven Borrman (1933 in Riguldi – 2004), light heavyweight weightlifter, he competed in the 1960 Summer Olympics
- Ilmar Reepalu (born 1943 in Nõva), chairman of the municipal board in Malmö Municipality, 1994 to 2013.
- Hardo Aasmäe (1951 in Rannajõe – 2014), geographer, entrepreneur and politician; Mayor of Tallinn, 1991/1992
