= Kullamaa Parish =

Former municipality of Estonia

Coordinates: 58.879°N 24.082°E

Kullamaa Parish Kullamaa vald
- Former municipality of Estonia
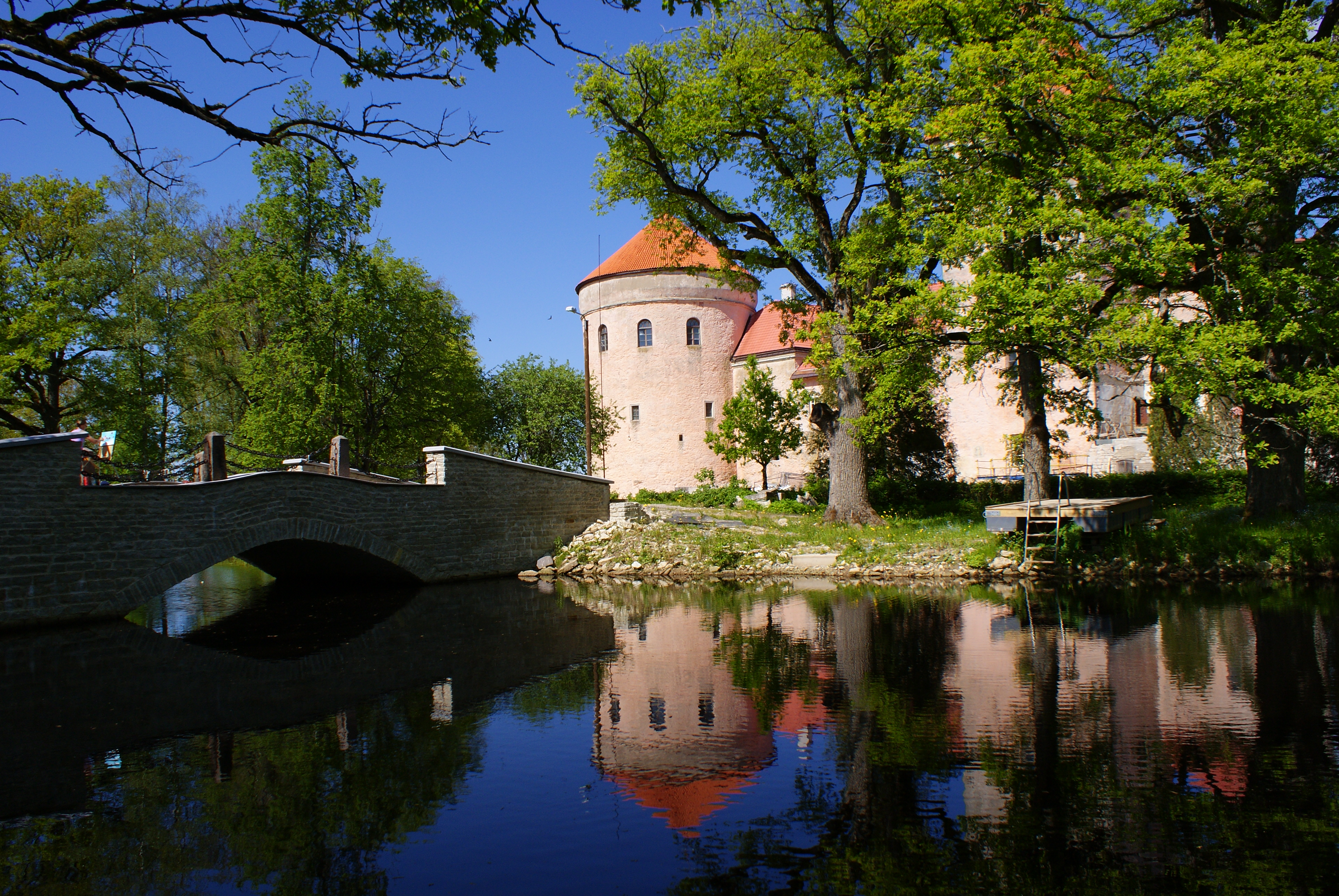
- Koluvere manor

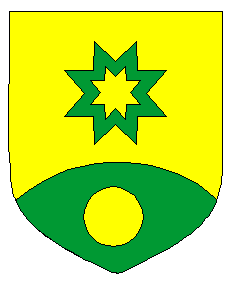
- Flag Coat of arms

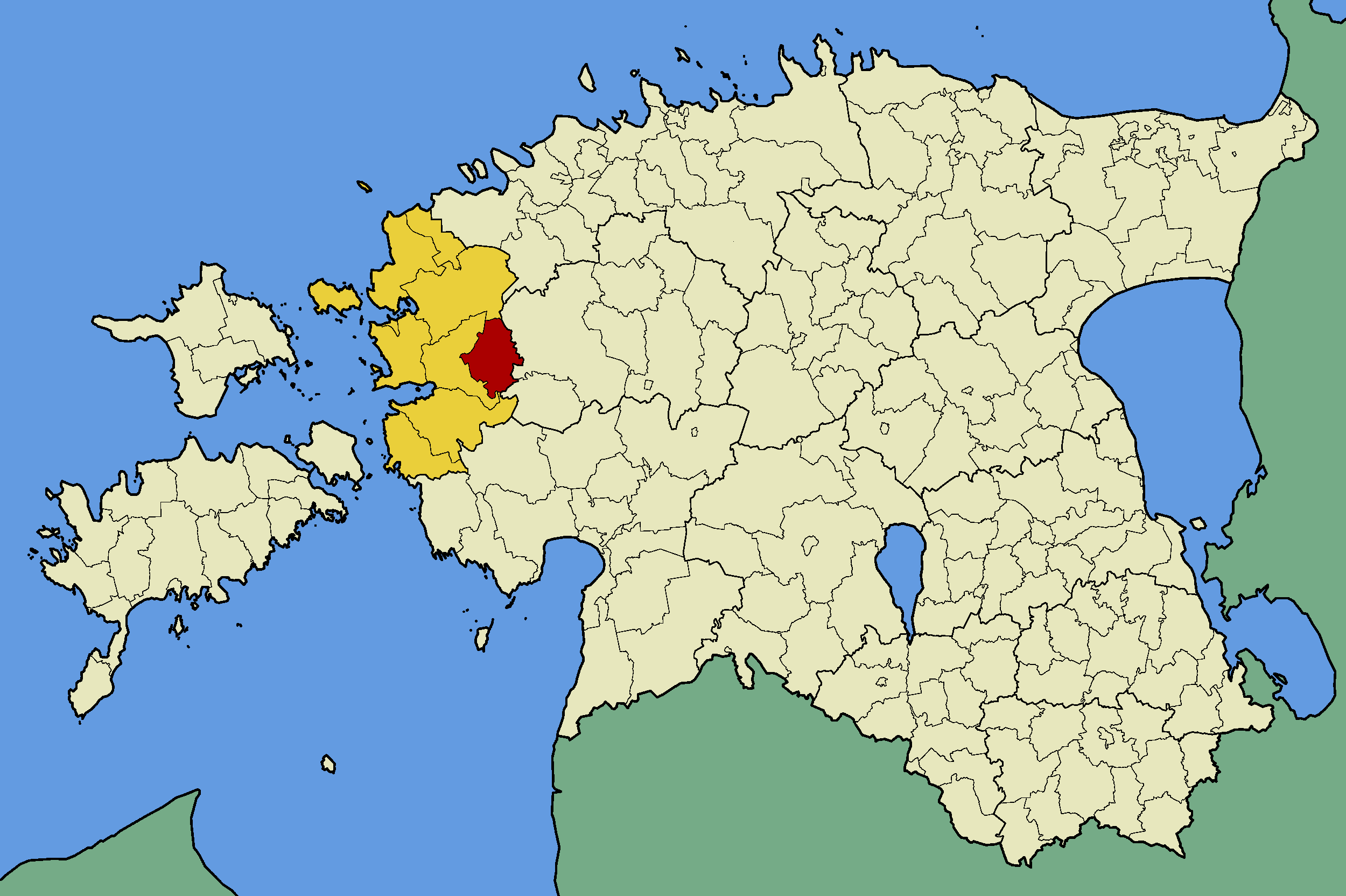
- Kullamaa Parish within Lääne County.
- Country: Estonia
- County: Lääne County
- Administrative centre: Kullamaa

Area
  - Total: 224.6 km^{2} (86.7 sq mi)

Population (2006)
  - Total: 1,398
  - Density: 6.224/km^{2} (16.12/sq mi)
- Website: www.kullamaa.ee

Kullamaa (Estonian: Kullamaa vald) was a rural municipality of Estonia, in Lääne County. It had a population of 1398 (2006) and an area of 224.6 km^{2}.

== Populated places ==
Kullamaa Parish had 14 villages: Jõgisoo, Kalju, Kastja, Koluvere, Kullamaa, Kullametsa, Leila, Lemmikküla, Liivi, Mõrdu, Päri, Silla, Ubasalu, Üdruma.
