= Buxhoeveden =

Buxhoeveden may refer to:

- Buxhoeveden family, a Baltic German family in Estonia and the Russian Empire
- Albert of Buxhoeveden (c. 1165 – 1229), Bishop of Riga
- Friedrich Wilhelm von Buxhoeveden (or Buxhowden, 1750-1811), Russian infantry general and government official
- Hermann of Buxhoeveden (1163–1248), Prince-Bishop of Dorpat (1224–1248), Livonian Confederation
- Reinhold von Buxhoeveden (died 1557), Bishop of Saare-Lääne (Ösel–Wiek), Estonia
- Baroness Sophie Buxhoeveden (1883-1956), lady in waiting to Tsarina Alexandra of Russia and memoirist

== See also ==
- Bexhövede, a town in the Cuxhaven district of Lower Saxony, Germany, the origin of the Buxhoeveden family
