= Duchess Auguste Karoline of Brunswick-Wolfenbüttel =

Auguste Karoline
- Duchess Frederick of Württemberg
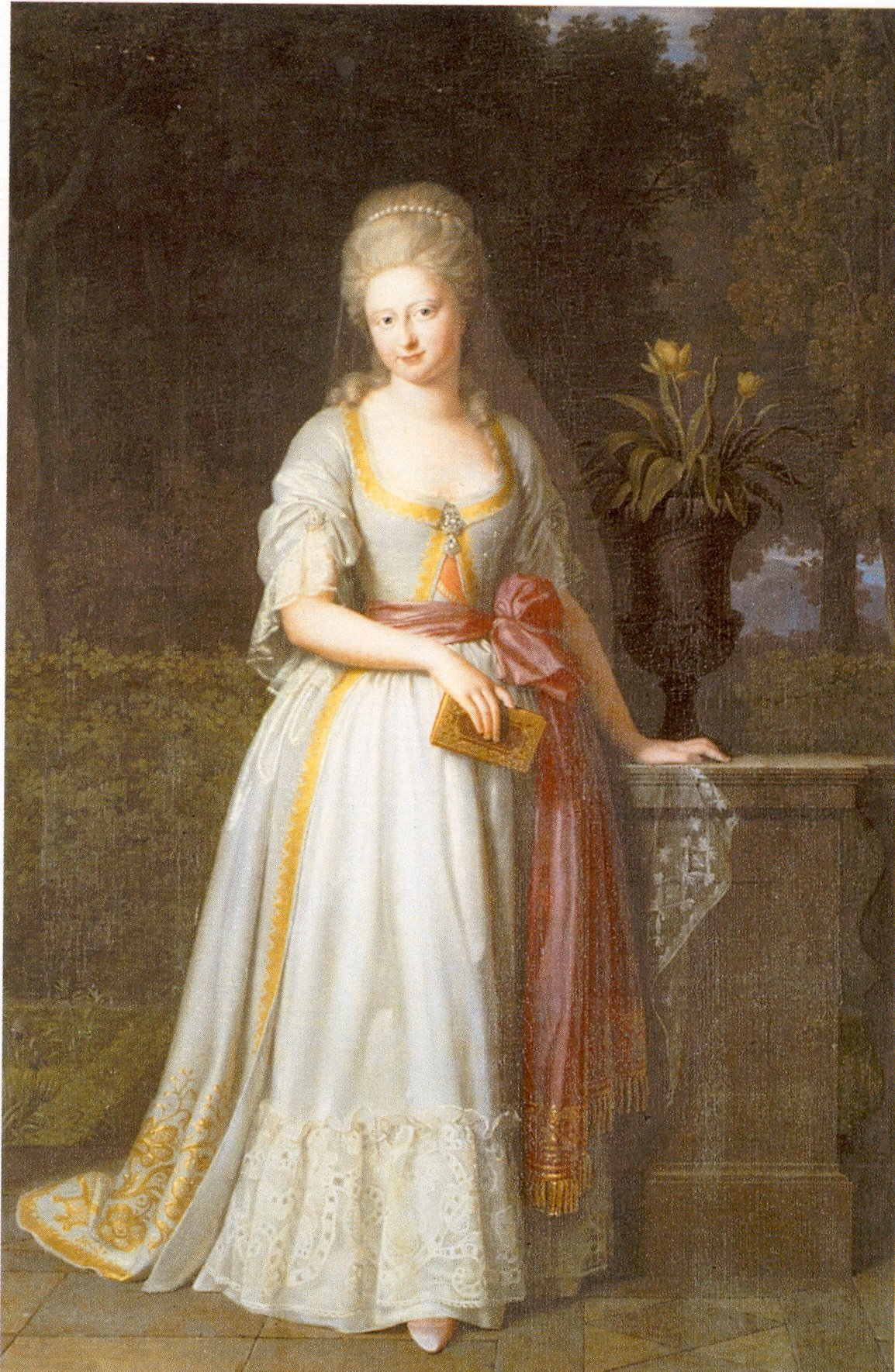
- Portrait of Auguste, 1780s
- Born: 3 December 1764; Brunswick
- Died: 27 September 1788 (aged 23); Koluvere castle, Lohde, Russian Empire
- Spouse: Duke Frederick of Württemberg (m. 1780)
- Issue: William I, King of Württemberg; Catharina, Queen of Westphalia; Duchess Sophia Dorothea; Prince Paul
Names
- Augusta Caroline Frederica Luise
- House: Brunswick-Bevern
- Father: Charles William Ferdinand, Duke of Brunswick
- Mother: Princess Augusta of Great Britain

Duchess Auguste Karoline of Brunswick-Wolfenbüttel (Augusta Caroline Frederica Louise; 3 December 1764 – 27 September 1788), was the first wife of Frederick of Württemberg and the mother of William I of Württemberg. It was an abusive relationship but her family would not initially allow a divorce.

== Early life ==
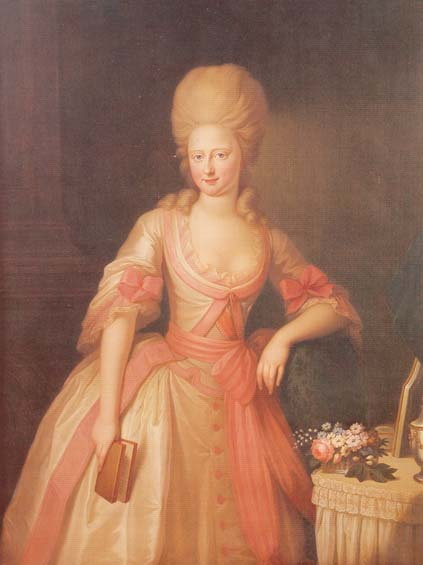
Auguste after her marriage;unknown painter.

Princess Auguste Karoline was born in Brunswick, the eldest child of Charles William Ferdinand, Duke of Brunswick and Princess Augusta of Great Britain, the elder sister of George III of the United Kingdom. She was named in honour of her mother and grandmother. Auguste Karoline was the eldest of seven children, and her younger sister, Princess Caroline, would marry the future George IV of the United Kingdom.

== Marriage ==
On 15 October 1780, at the age of 15, Auguste Karoline was married in Brunswick to Duke Frederick of Württemberg, eldest son of Duke Frederick Eugene, himself the youngest brother of the reigning Charles Eugene, Duke of Württemberg. As neither the reigning Duke nor the middle brother had any sons, Frederick's father and then Frederick himself were expected to succeed in time as Duke of Württemberg.

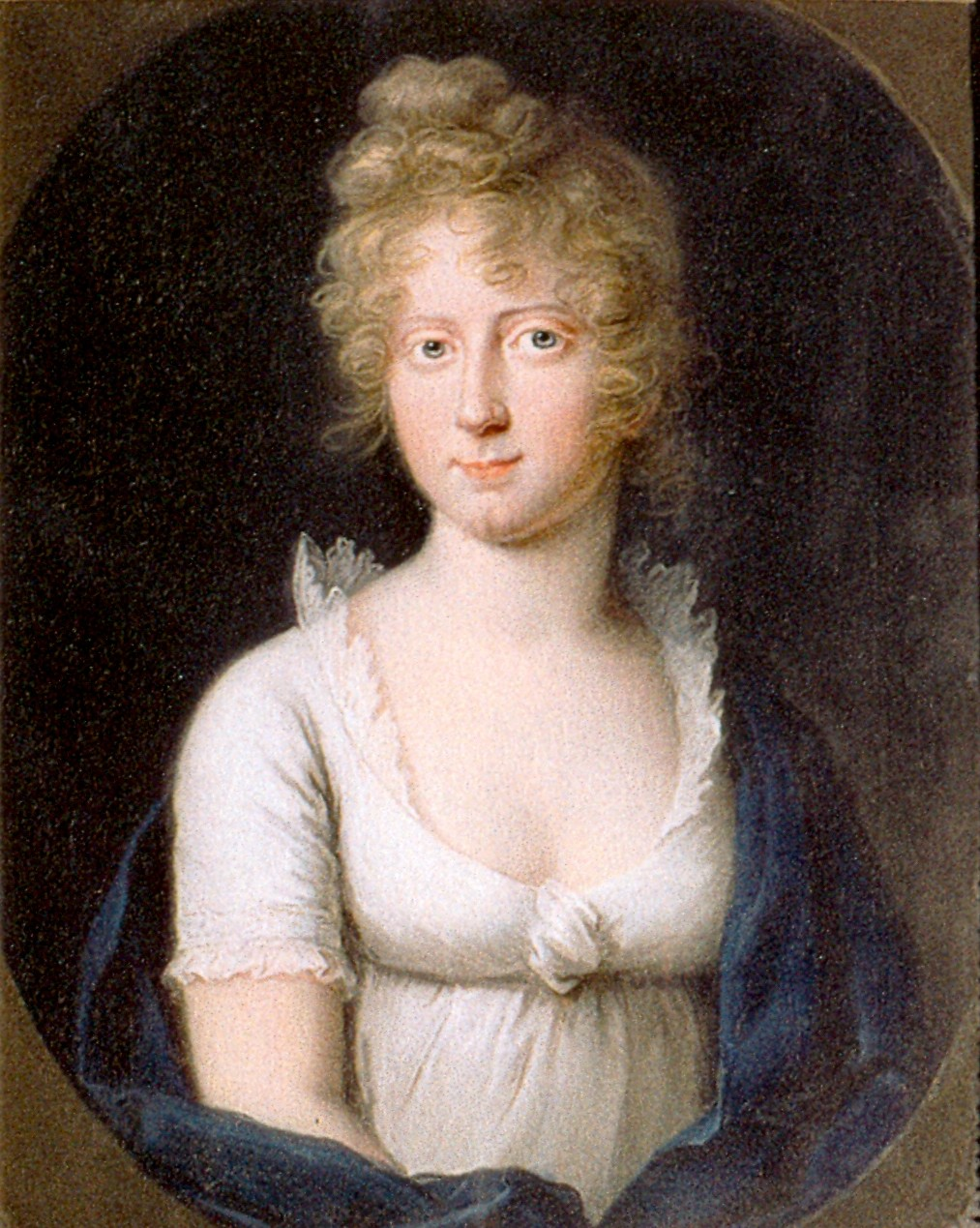
Auguste Karoline, Duchess Frederick of Württemberg

That eventuality was, however, many years in the future, and the birth of a legitimate heir would end Frederick's hopes conclusively. Moreover, his uncle the Duke was not disposed to give any member of his family any role in affairs of government. Frederick was in Prussian employ as a major-general. After the wedding, Auguste Karoline followed him to Lüben, a small town in Eastern Prussia, where his regiment was stationed. At that time, the Empress of Russia, Catherine II, and the Holy Roman Emperor, Joseph II, were forging a new alliance, which would be sealed by a marriage between Elisabeth of Württemberg (younger sister to Frederick), and Francis, son of the Holy Roman Emperor's brother and successor, Leopold II.

The King of Prussia, Frederick II, was opposed to the alliance, which he accused Frederick of supporting. Accordingly, the relations between Frederick and the King soured to the point that Frederick saw himself forced to leave Prussia. Prince Frederick resigned in December 1781, sent Auguste Karoline and their infant son William back to Brunswick and joined his other sister Maria Feodorovna (now Tsarevna of Russia) and her husband on the Italian leg of their extended tour through Europe. While in Naples, in February 1782, Frederick received an invitation from the Russian Empress to move to St Petersburg as Lieutenant-general in her army and Governor-General of Eastern Finland, with his seat at Viipuri. After spending the summer with Auguste Karoline in Montbéliard, his parents' home, they finally arrived in St Petersburg in October 1782, where the Empress had renovated and lavishly furnished a mansion for them.

=== Separation ===
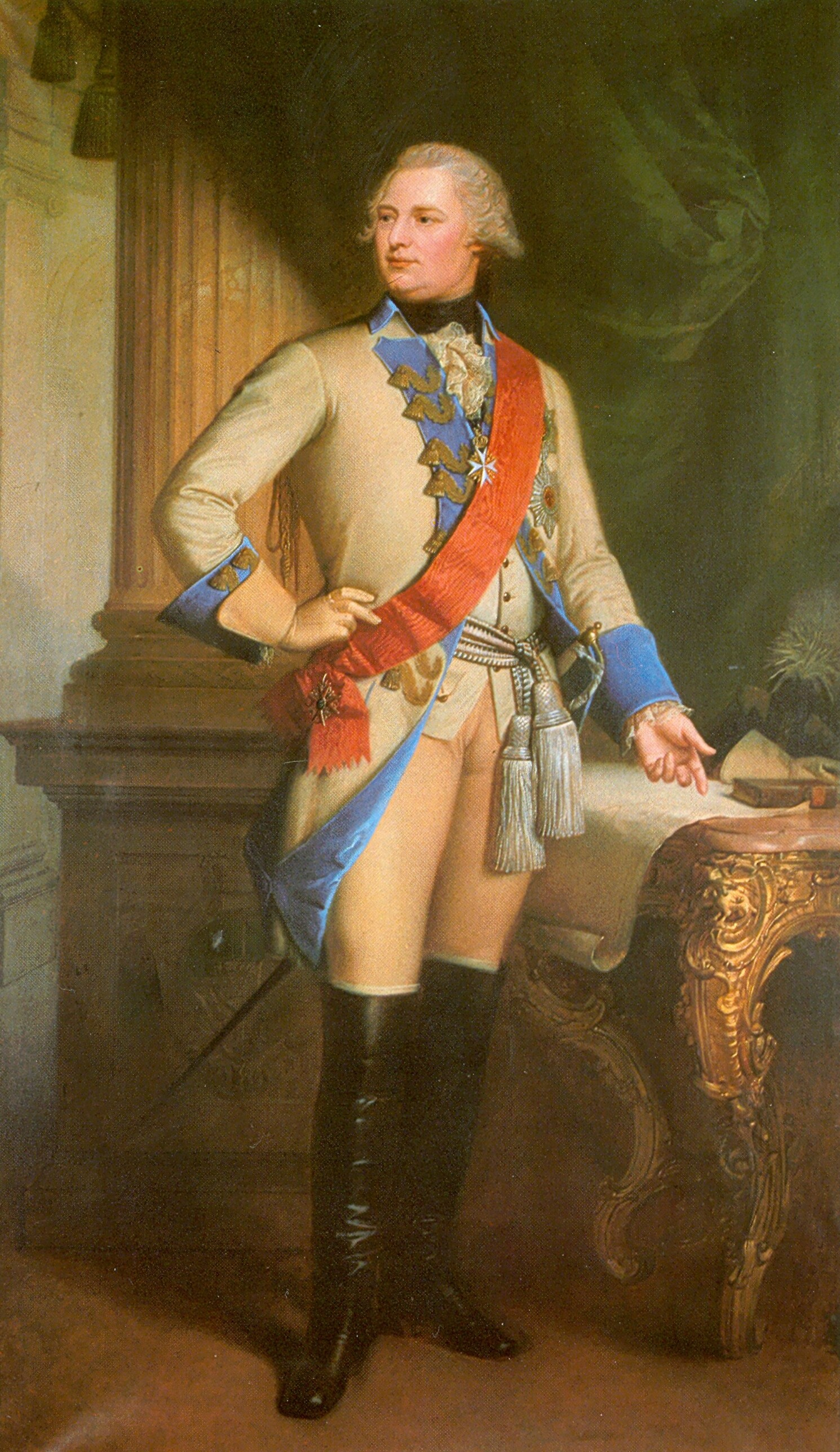
Duke Frederick of Württemberg, her husband

It was no secret that the marriage between Auguste Karoline and Frederick was an unhappy union of two mismatched personalities. Already in the first year of marriage, there was talk of a divorce, but Auguste Karoline's father absolutely refused, threatening his daughter with social ostracization should she leave her husband. After secret investigations, the Empress discovered that Prince Frederick, whom she would call a "ferocious rogue", was to blame for the discord. She took it upon herself to protect Auguste Karoline, whose conduct she found "perfectly blameless", from her husband's violent nature. Over the next three years, three more children were born, of which the second daughter, Dorothée, would die at nine months.

The relationship between Auguste Karoline and her abusive husband deteriorated to the point that Catherine wrote an urgent letter to Auguste Karoline's father that his daughter's life was in danger. When the Duke was hesitant to take action, Catherine urged Auguste Karoline to leave her husband and arranged for a police carriage to be on standby at all times. Eventually, on 28 December 1786, Auguste Karoline fled to the Hermitage, where Catherine gave her asylum and ordered Frederick to leave Russia. When Tsarevna Maria Feodorovna protested at the treatment of her brother, Catherine replied curtly, "It is not I who cover the Prince of Württemberg with shame; instead, I try to cover up his appalling behaviour. It is my duty to suppress such things." It became known that shortly before Auguste Karoline fled, Frederick had plotted (unsuccessfully) to have his wife raped in order to have her reputation dishonoured.

== Later life and death ==
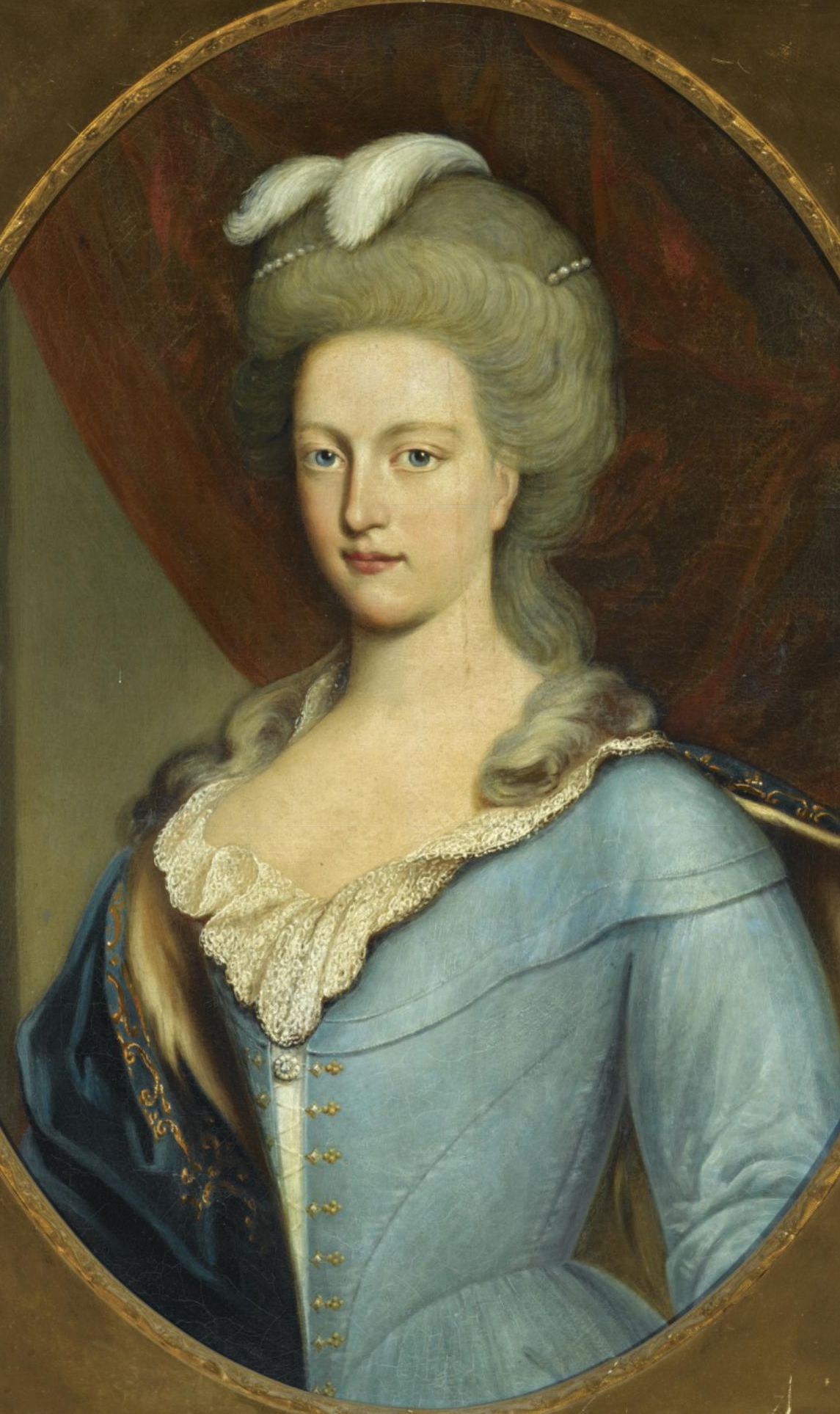
Auguste Karoline, Duchess Frederick of Württemberg, 1788

While the divorce conditions were being ironed out between Auguste Karoline, Frederick, the Empress and Duke Charles during which time the Empress was on a long journey to the south, Auguste Karoline was sent to one of the Imperial estates, Lohde Castle, in Lohde (now Koluvere) in Kullamaa Parish to the south-west of Tallinn, Estonia, for her own safety. Because Frederick insisted on having custody of all three children, Auguste Karoline refused to sign the divorce papers.

Fearing retribution should she return to Brunswick, Auguste Karoline accepted Catherine's suggestion to settle in Estonia. Auguste Karoline's companions were Major-general Wilhelm von Pohlmann (9 April 1727 – 22 January 1796), Madame Wilde (replaced by Madame Bistram in 1788) and Pohlmann's two daughters, Katharina (1758–1831) and Margarethe (d. 1800). The sixty-year-old Pohlmann, who had retired to his estate near Lohde six years before, had enjoyed an illustrious career at the Russian Court; he was a close and trusted friend of the Empress, who had appointed him to the board of the prestigious Free Economic Society of Russia. From Lodhe, Auguste Karoline kept up a regular correspondence with the Empress, who never ceased to care for her and with her mother to whom she expressed her satisfaction with the peaceful country life. The Empress sold Auguste Karoline's house in St Petersburg on her behalf, advised her to invest the money wisely and allowed her to live off the income from the Lohde estate.

For a few years already, Auguste Karoline had been suffering from amenorrhea, for which her doctor had been treating her with potentially dangerous herbal potions, designed to stimulate menstruation. On the morning of 27 September 1788 (new style), at the age of 23, Auguste Karoline suddenly experienced violent vaginal bleeding, which continued for six-and-a-half hours, by which time she died. Her doctor had been summoned, but due to the long distance, he arrived too late. The Princess's parents received a letter of condolences from the Empress, as well as Pohlmann's report of her death and her doctor's report. Many years later, her eldest son had the matter investigated and her body was exhumed. It was found that contrary to local rumours, she had been buried neither alive nor with the bones of a baby.

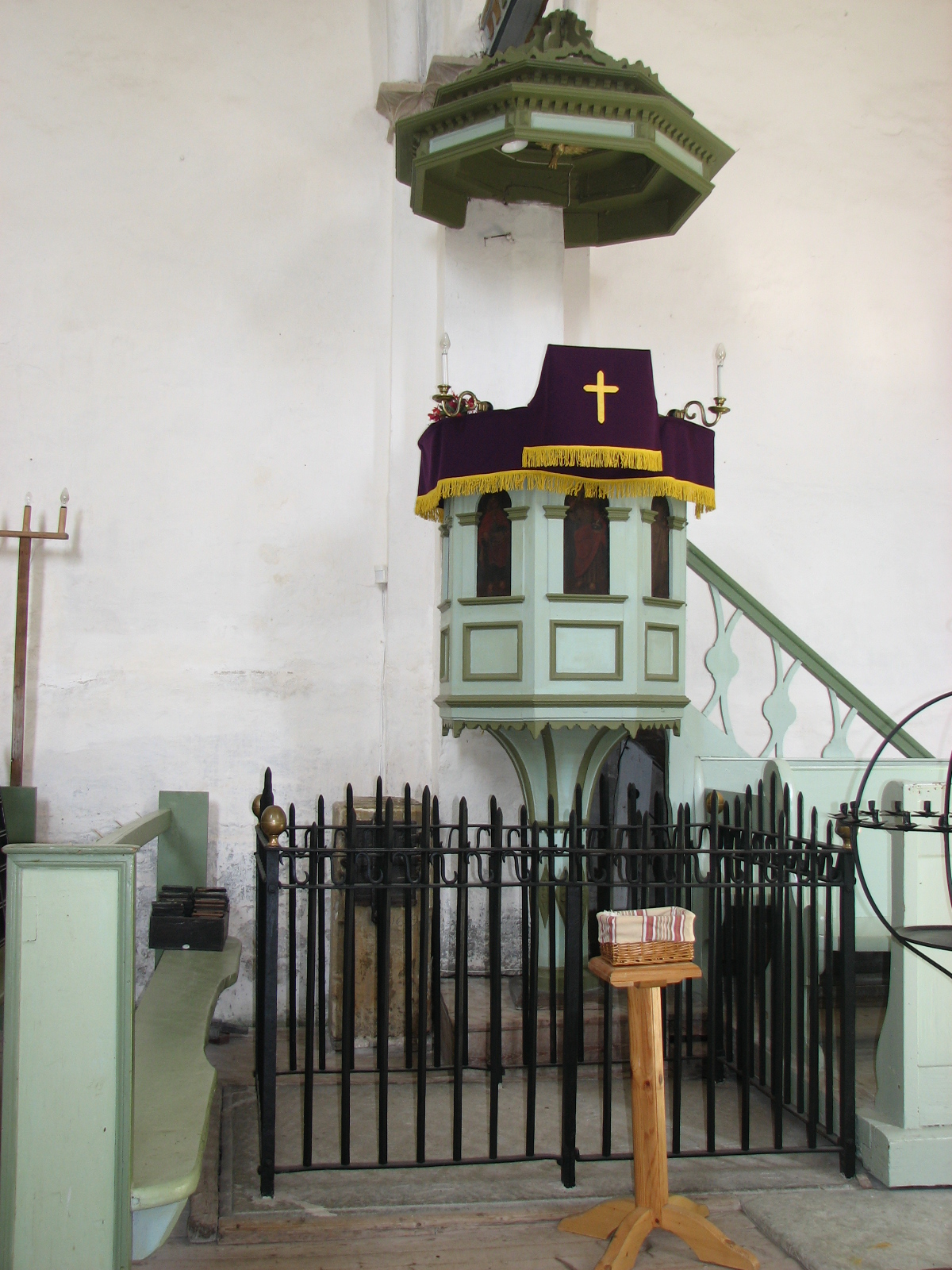
Auguste Karoline's Grave in Kullamaa Church.

Auguste Karoline was buried under the floor of Kullamaa Church. On her tombstone is the text: "Hic jacet in pace Augusta Carolina Friderica Luisa Ducis Brunsuicencis-Guelferbytani Filia Friderici Guilielmi Caroli Ducis Vurtembergensis et Supremi Praefecti Viburgiensis Uxor Nat. d. III. Dec. MDCCLXIV Denat. d. XIV. Sept. MDCCLXXXVIII" The date is false - it should have been XVI September. Over the years, her coffin decayed, causing her bones to get lost in the bottom of the deep crypt. Her tombstone is still in the church, albeit in a different position, surrounded by an iron rail.

The castle and lands of Koluvere were afterwards granted to Count Friedrich Wilhelm von Buxhoeveden.

== Fiction ==
Auguste Karoline's story was fictionalized by Thackeray in The Luck of Barry Lyndon.

== Issue ==
Auguste Karoline and Frederick I of Württemberg had four children:

1. Prince William of Württemberg (1781–1864), who succeeded his father as King of Württemberg.
2. Princess Catherine of Württemberg (1783–1835), who married Jérôme Bonaparte, King of Westphalia.
3. Duchess Sophia Dorothea of Württemberg (1783–1784) died young.
4. Prince Paul of Württemberg (1785–1852).

== Ancestry ==
Ancestors of Duchess Auguste Karoline of Brunswick-Wolfenbüttel

8. Ferdinand Albert II, Duke of Brunswick-Wolfenbüttel
4. Charles I, Duke of Brunswick-Wolfenbüttel
9. Duchess Antoinette of Brunswick-Wolfenbüttel
2. Charles William Ferdinand, Duke of Brunswick
10. Frederick William I of Prussia
5. Princess Philippine Charlotte of Prussia
11. Princess Sophia Dorothea of Hanover
1. Duchess Auguste Karoline of Brunswick-Wolfenbüttel
12. George II of Great Britain
6. Frederick, Prince of Wales
13. Princess Caroline of Brandenburg-Ansbach
3. Princess Augusta of Great Britain
14. Frederick II, Duke of Saxe-Gotha-Altenburg
7. Princess Augusta of Saxe-Gotha
15. Princess Magdalena Augusta of Anhalt-Zerbst

== Sources ==
- Kühle, Riëtha (2021). Princess Auguste - On a Tightrope between Love and Abuse. KDP.
- Münch, Ingrid (1997). Christoph Römer (ed.). Die Württembergische Heirat der Herzogin Auguste Friederike von Braunschweig (1764-1788). Braunschweig-Bevern: Braunschweigischen Landesmuseum.
- Sauer, Paul (1984). Der Schwäbische Zar: Friedrich-Württembergs erster König. Deutsche Verlags-Anstalt.
- Toll, Harald Baron (1901). Prinzessin Auguste von Württemberg in Beiträgen zur Kunde Ehst-, Liv- und Kurlands, book 1. Vol. 4.
- Wagener-Fimpel, Silke (2018). Auguste Karoline Friederike, Prinzessin von Württemberg, geb. Herzogin zu Braunschweig und Lüneburg (Wolfenbüttel) in Steinwascher, Gerd (ed.), Russlands Blick nach Nordwestdeutschland. Wallstein.
