= Oskar Mildebrath =

Estionian pharmacist

- Born: March 2, 1849; Koluvere, Governorate of Estonia
- Died: January 9, 1900 (aged 50); Kullamaa, Governorate of Estonia
- Occupation: Pharmacist
- Known for: Founder of Kullamaa Pharmacy

Oskar Fridrich Woldemar Mildebrath (March 2, 1849 – January 9, 1900) was a pharmacist in the Russian Empire who founded one of the oldest rural pharmacies in the country that stayed in business continuously at the same place, in the same building for 122 years.

Oskar Mildebrath was born on March 2, 1849, in Koluvere, Läänemaa, Governorate of Estonia to Martin Friedrich Mildebrath and Julie Elisabeth (née Anderson). Martin Friedrich Mildebrath was originally from Woedtke in Prussia.

Mildebrath graduated as a pharmacist from the University of Tartu. He worked at the Haapsalu pharmacy between 1875 and 1877. In 1877–1878, he participated in the Russo-Turkish War. From 1880 to 1885 he worked at Raeapteek, Tallinn's Town Hall Pharmacy, where he was the first Estonian-speaking pharmacist with a university degree. Mildebrath was also a member of the Society of Estonian Literati and considered one of the most outstanding intellectuals living in the town at the time.

On July 30, 1886, Mildebrath founded one of the oldest rural pharmacies in Estonia, at Kullamaa. It stayed in business continuously for 122 years, until 2008.
