= Mordu =

Mordu may refer to:

- Mõrdu, a village in Estonia
- Mor'du, a villain in the 2012 Pixar movie Brave
