= Heinrich Göseken =

Baltic German theologian

Heinrich Göseken (13 April 1612 Hanover – 4 December 1681) was a Baltic-German Lutheran pastor, language enthusiast, occasional poet, and translator. He is credited with writing a grammar of Estonian as well as a Latin–Estonian–German dictionary.

From 1631 to 1634, he studied at Rostock University.

In 1637, he came to Tallinn. He quickly learned Estonian and he worked in western Estonia as a pastor at Kirbla (1638), Risti and Harju-Madise (1639–1641), and Kullamaa (1641–1681). In 1647 he became a dean of Maa-Lääne deanery, and in 1659 an assessor of the Consistory of Tallinn.

He was buried in Kullamaa Church.

== Works ==
In 1641, he wrote the poem: "Heh sel ke Jumlakartus sees" (He Who Is In the Fear of God), one of the first poems in Estonian. In 1656, he published Neu Ehstnisches Gesangbuch (New Estonian Hymnal).

In 1660, he published a grammar of Estonian: Manuductio ad Linguam Oesthicam / Anführung zue Öhstnischen Sprache (Introduction to Estonian). This book also contains a glossary of Estonian words, and it is the most extensive Estonian lexicon from the 17th century.
