= Kalju, Lääne County =

Village in Estonia

Coordinates: 58°54′43″N 24°04′41″E

Kalju
- Village
- Interactive map of Kalju
- Country: Estonia
- County: Lääne County
- Parish: Lääne-Nigula Parish
- Time zone: UTC+2 (EET)
  - Summer (DST): UTC+3 (EEST)

Kalju (German: Groß-Kaljo) is a village in Lääne-Nigula Parish, Lääne County, in western Estonia.

Before the administrative reform in 2017, the village was in Kullamaa Parish.
