= Friedrich Wilhelm von Buxhoeveden =

Russian general (1750–1811)

Count Friedrich Wilhelm von Buxhoeveden
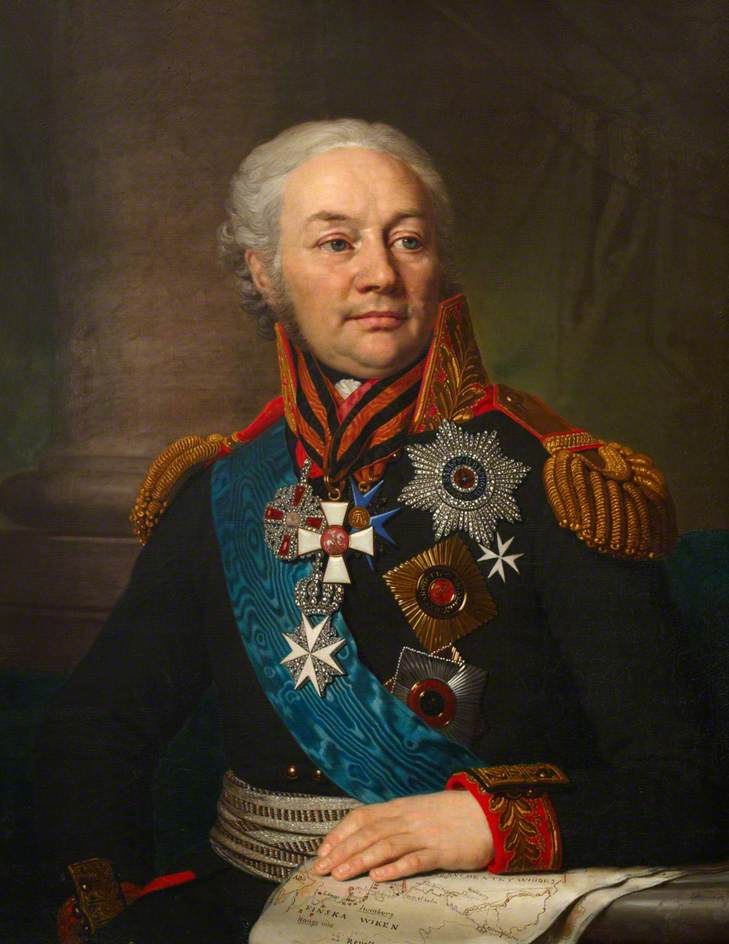
- Portrait by Vladimir Borovikovsky, c. 1809

Governor General of Livonia
- In office 1808–1809
- Preceded by: Count Alexander Tormasov
- Succeeded by: Prince Dmitry Lobanov-Rostovsky
- In office 1803–1806
- Preceded by: Prince Sergei Golitsyn
- Succeeded by: Count Alexander Tormasov

Governor General of Saint Petersburg
- In office 1797–1798
- Preceded by: Nikolai Arkharov
- Succeeded by: Peter Ludwig von der Pahlen

Personal details
- Born: September 13, 1750 Muhu, Governate of Riga, Russian Empire
- Died: September 4, 1811 (aged 60) Lode Castle, Governorate of Estonia, Russian Empire
- Education: Second Cadet Corps

Military service
- Allegiance: Russia
- Branch/service: Imperial Russian Army; Imperial Austrian Army
- Years of service: 1770–1798, 1802–1810
- Rank: General of Infantry
- Unit: Kexholm Life Guards Regiment^{[ru]} (1783–1787)
- Commands: Army of Volhynia (1805); Finland Corps (1808)
- Battles/wars: Russo-Turkish War (1768–1774); Russo-Swedish War (1788–1790); Polish–Russian War of 1792; Battle of Mir (1792); Kościuszko Uprising; Battle of Krupczyce; Battle of Praga; Napoleonic Wars; War of the Third Coalition; Battle of Austerlitz; War of the Fourth Coalition; Finnish War; Siege of Sveaborg

Friedrich Wilhelm Graf von Buxhoeveden (Note: Other spellings include Feodor Buxhoevden, Buxhœwden, and Buxhöwden.) (Russian: Фёдор Фёдорович Буксгевден, romanized: Fyodor Fyodorovich Buksgevden; 13 September [O.S. 2 September] 1750 – 4 September [O.S. 23 August] 1811) was a Baltic German general of the infantry and government official in Russian service. He participated in several of Russia's wars in the late 18th and early 19th centuries, including the Battle of Austerlitz in 1805. During the Finnish War of 1808–09 he served as commander-in-chief of the Russian forces and was simultaneously responsible for the civil administration of occupied Finland, a role for which he is remembered with appreciation in Finland.

== Family ==
The Buxhoevedens, a Baltic German family, traced their roots to Bexhövede in Lower Saxony, from where they moved to Livonia in the 13th century. During the period of Swedish rule over Livonia the family served Sweden, but when Sweden lost Livonia they remained in their home region and became Russian subjects.

Buxhoevden's wife, countess Natalia Alexeyeva, was a daughter of the imperial court; her exact parentage has been disputed by historians. (Note: The Biografiskt lexikon för Finland identifies her as a daughter of Empress Catherine the Great, while other sources identify her as an illegitimate daughter of Grigory Orlov by a member of the Apraksin family.) Buxhoeveden's granddaughter Varvara Nelidova was a mistress of Nicholas I of Russia (1796–1855) for 17 years (1832–1855).

== Career ==
=== Early career ===
Buxhoeveden entered Russian military service in 1764 and took part in the Russo-Turkish War (1768–1774). He married Natalia Alexeyeva in 1777, a connection that proved highly advantageous for his advancement at the Russian imperial court. He was promoted to colonel in 1783 and major general in 1789. His rapid rise owed more to his social connections than to his abilities as a commander.

During the Russo-Swedish War (1788–1790) he participated in the first Battle of Svensksund in August 1789. In the Polish–Russian wars of 1792 and 1794 he served as a divisional commander, and in 1795 was appointed military governor of the recently captured Warsaw, where he actively worked to prevent violence against the city's population by Russian troops. He was granted a hereditary countship by the King of Prussia, a title subsequently also conferred on him in Russia. In 1797 he was appointed Governor General of Saint Petersburg, but fell out of favour with Tsar Paul I the following year and was exiled to his estates.

=== Napoleonic Wars ===
In 1805, Buxhoevden commanded the left wing of the allied Russo-Austrian army at the Battle of Austerlitz. The battle ended in defeat for the coalition forces.

On 9 October [O.S. 27 September] 1806, during the War of the Fourth Coalition, Buxhoeveden was entrusted with a corps of four divisions. Tensions arose between him and Bennigsen, and when Bennigsen's army fought the French at Pultusk and Golymin, Buxhoeveden remained inactive near Maków Mazowiecki. He was subsequently relieved of command and replaced by Bennigsen.

=== Finnish War 1808–09 ===
In 1808, Buxhoeveden was appointed commander-in-chief of the Russian forces invading Swedish Finland and simultaneously placed in charge of the civil administration of the occupied territories. Former members of the Anjala league – officers who had conspired against the Swedish king during the 1788–90 war – served on his staff and were tasked with the political incorporation of the territory, including issuing a proclamation promising to convene the Finnish Estates in Turku.

After besieging Sveaborg, Buxhoeveden advanced with his main force to Turku within a month, establishing his headquarters there. He devoted more attention to the administration of the occupied territory than to military operations. The occupation compared favourably with the earlier Russian occupation during the Lesser Wrath of the 1740s: Buxhoeveden investigated incidents of violence by Russian troops and paid compensation from Russian imperial funds to those who had suffered harm.

On 29 September he concluded the Armistice of Lohtaja with the Swedish forces, a decision that caused considerable displeasure in Saint Petersburg, where he was considered to have exceeded his authority. He subsequently confirmed the Convention of Olkijoki in November. Citing poor health, he relinquished command and was replaced as commander-in-chief by General Bogdan von Knorring.

== Estates ==
Buxhoevden received the castle and lands of Koluvere in western Estonia after Duchess Augusta of Brunswick-Wolfenbüttel had died there in 1788 in suspicious circumstances. He also owned the villa and manor of Ligovo near Saint Petersburg. He died at Lode Castle (now Koluvere) in Estonia in 1811.

== Legacy ==
Buxhoeveden's reputation in Finland is largely positive. His conduct as commander of the occupying army compared favourably with that of earlier conquerors, and he is remembered for his efforts to protect the civilian population. From a Russian perspective, however, he was regarded as a weak commander who gave the Swedish forces respite when they should have been pressed hardest, and whose campaign ended in a failed armistice agreement.

== Awards ==
Russian Empire awards:

- Order of Saint George, 4th Degree (26 November 1774)
- Order of Saint George, 3rd Degree (22 August 1789)
- Order of Saint Anna (8 September 1790)
- Cross "For the Capture of Praga" (1794)
- Golden Weapon for Bravery with diamonds (1794)
- Order of Saint Vladimir, 2nd Class (1794)
- Order of Saint Alexander Nevsky (15 February 1797)
- Order of Saint Vladimir, 1st Degree (1806)
- Order of the Holy Apostle Andrew the First-Called (17 September 1807), diamond badges added in 1808
- Order of Saint George, 2nd Degree (27 April 1808)

Foreign state awards:

- Order of the White Eagle, 1795 from the Polish–Lithuanian Commonwealth
- Order of Saint Stanislaus, 1795, from the Polish–Lithuanian Commonwealth
- Order of the Black Eagle, from Kingdom of Prussia
- Order of Saint John of Jerusalem, from Kingdom of Prussia

== See also ==
- Albert of Buxhoeveden (c. 1165–1229), an earlier member of the family

== Sources ==
- "Буксгевден, Федор Федорович" . Brockhaus and Efron Encyclopedic Dictionary (in Russian). 1906.
- Novitsky, Vasily F. (1911). "БУКСГЕВДЕНЪ, гр., Ѳеодоръ Ѳеодоровичъ (Фридрихъ-Вильгельмъ)" [Buxhoeveden, count, Fyodor Fyodorovich (Friedrich-Wilhelm)]. Военная энциклопедия (in Russian). Vol. 5: Бомбарда – Верещагин. Moscow: Ivan Sytin. pp. 139–141.
