= Buxhoeveden family =

Baltic German noble family

Coat of arms of the Buxhoeveden family

The Buxhoeveden family is a Baltic-German noble family of Lower Saxon origin once prominent in Estonia and Russia, with roots tracing to Bexhövede, Bremen-Verden, Germany. In Sweden, the family is considered part of the unintroduced nobility. On 18 December 1795, members of the family were granted the title of Count in the Kingdom of Prussia, and on 16 April 1797 they were awarded with the same title in the Russian Empire.

== Notable members ==
- Albert of Riga (1165–1229), third Bishop of Riga, founder of the Livonian Brothers of the Sword
- Hermann of Dorpat (1163–1248), first Bishop of Dorpat
- Reinhold von Buxhoeveden (est. 1480s–1557), bishop of the Bishopric of Ösel–Wiek from 1532 to 1541
- Friedrich Wilhelm von Buxhoevden (1750–1811), Imperial Russian military officer (infantry general)
- Baroness Sophie Buxhoeveden (1883–1956), lady in waiting to Tsarina Alexandra of Russia
- Arthur von Buxhoevden (1882–1964), Imperial Russian and Estonian military officer (colonel).

== Gallery ==
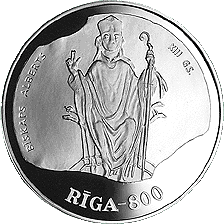
Albert of Riga on a Latvian coin.

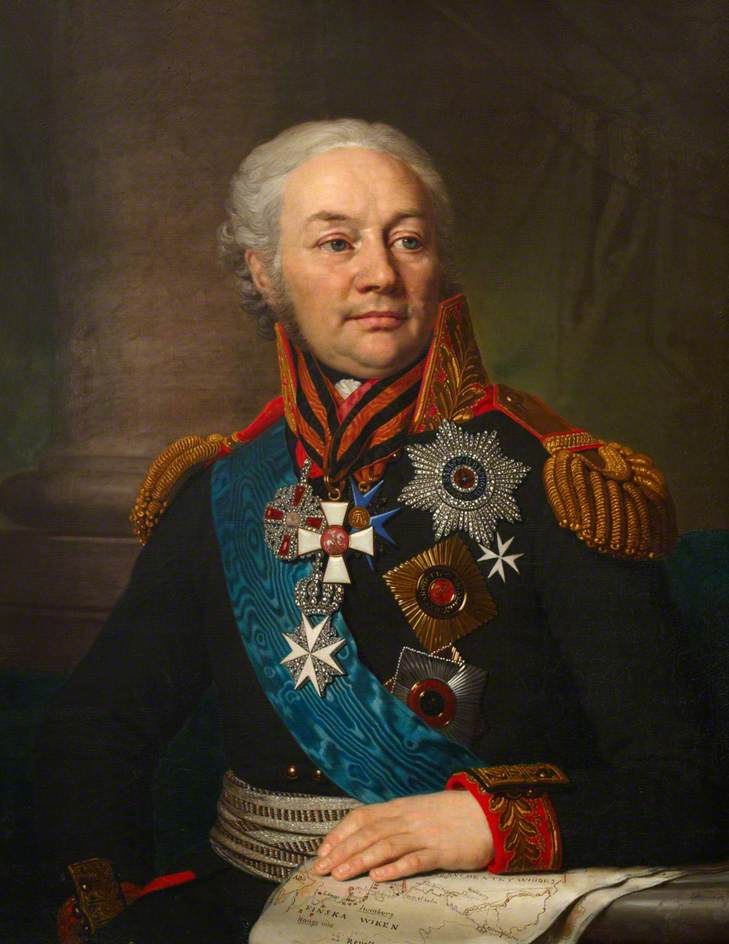
Friedrich Wilhelm von Buxhoeveden

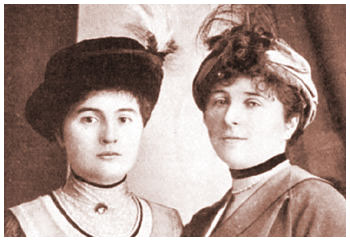
Sophie Buxhoeveden (right) with Countess Anastasia Hendrikova.
