= Hermann of Dorpat =

Prince-bishop in Livonia (1163–1248)

Hermann I
- Prince-Bishop of the Bishopric of Dorpat
- Reign: 1224–1248
- Born: Bexhövede, Duchy of Saxony
- Dynasty: House of Buxhoeveden

Hermann of Dorpat, also known as Hermann I or Hermann von Buxhövden (1163–1248), was the first Prince-Bishop of the Bishopric of Dorpat (1224–1248) within the Livonian Confederation.

== Biography ==
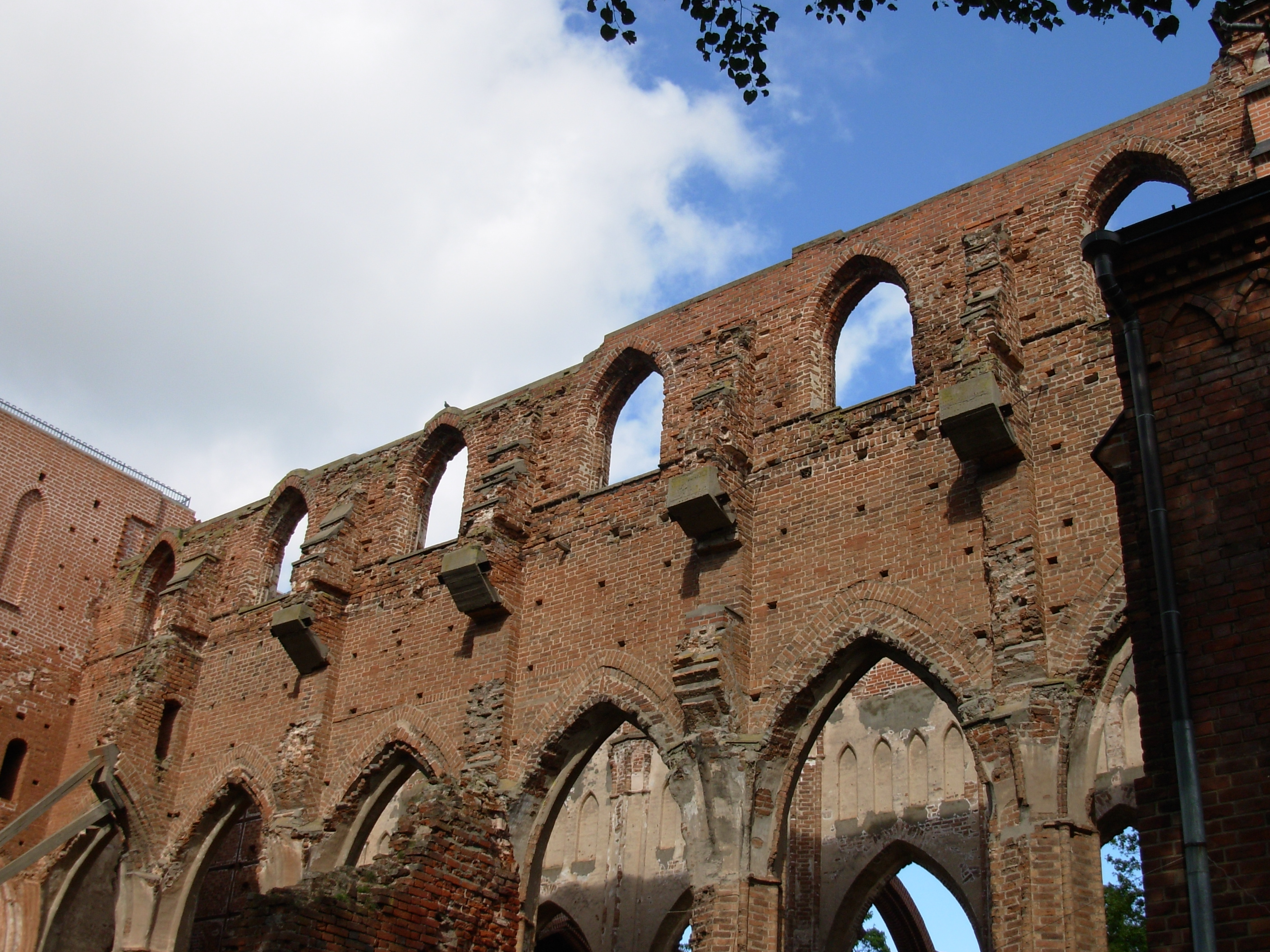
Ruins of the Tartu Cathedral, which was founded at Dorpat by Hermann

Hermann hailed from Bexhövede (now a part of Loxstedt, Lower Saxony) in the Duchy of Saxony, and was also known as "Hermann of Buxhoeveden" and other variations, such as Buxhöwden and Buxthoeven. He was the brother of Bishop Albert of Riga, who used his influence against King Valdemar II of Denmark to place the Livonian Brothers of the Sword in medieval Estonia. From 10 April 1220 – 21 July 1224, Hermann was the Bishop of Leal (Lihula), after which he took over the Bishopric of Dorpat.

Hermann founded the cathedral of Tartu (Dorpat) and led the Roman Catholic crusading army in the 1242 Battle of the Ice, which was won by the Russian Orthodox Alexander Nevsky of Novgorod. It has also been suggested that he founded the Raseborg Castle at the southern coast of Finland.

== Legacy ==
Hermann was the progenitor of the House of Buxhoeveden, a Baltic German family whose members entered Prussian, Swedish, and Russian service over the following centuries. Their descendants live in Germany, Finland, and Russia today.
