= Kastja =

Village in Estonia

Coordinates: 58°47′N 24°07′E

- Village
- Interactive map of Kastja
- Country: Estonia
- County: Lääne County
- Parish: Lääne-Nigula Parish
- Time zone: UTC+2 (EET)
  - Summer (DST): UTC+3 (EEST)

Kastja is a village in Lääne-Nigula Parish, Lääne County, in western Estonia.

Before the administrative reform in 2017, the village was in Kullamaa Parish.
