= Silla, Lääne County =

Village in Estonia

Coordinates: 58°51′35″N 24°04′34″E

Silla
- Village
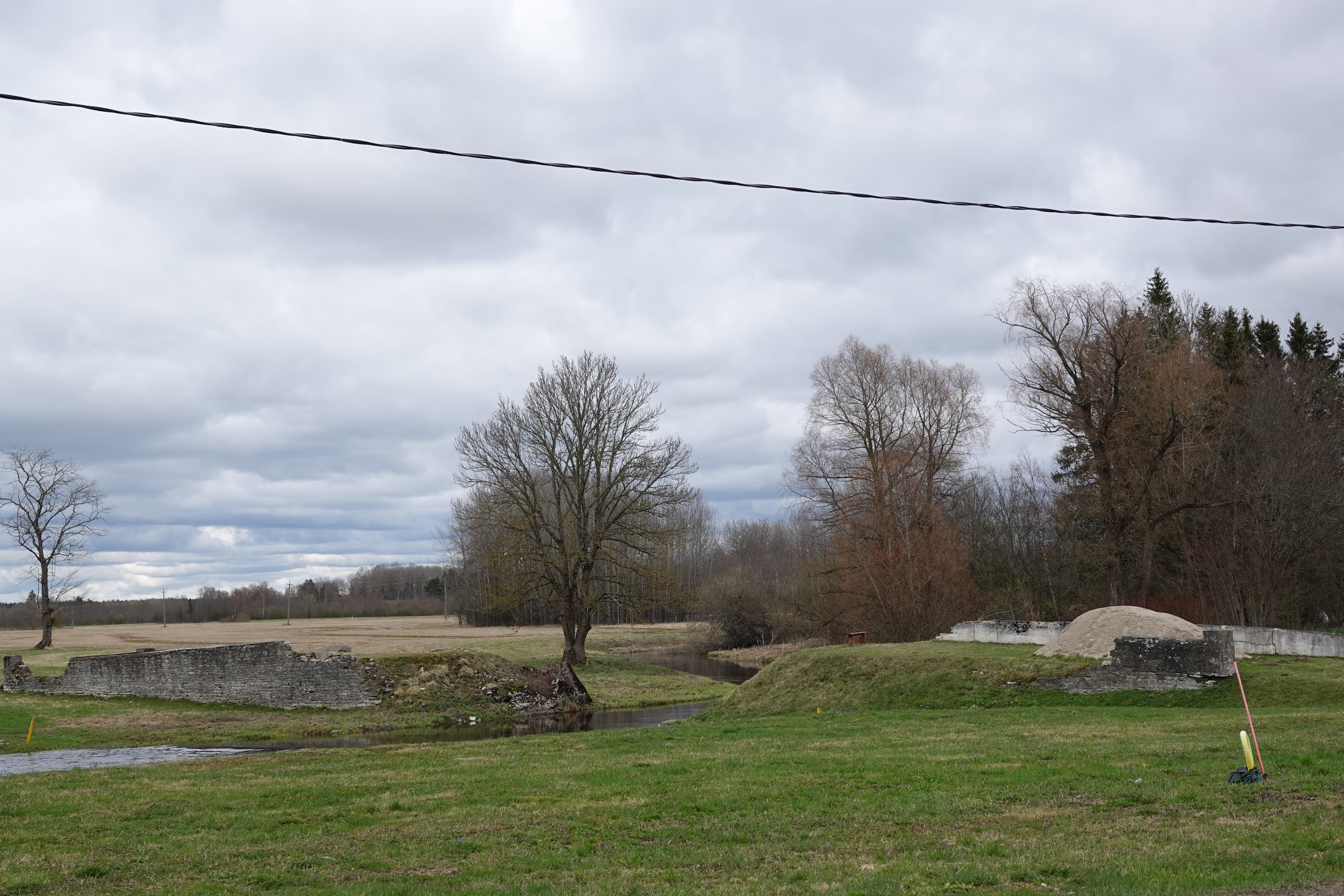
- Ruins of a bridge in Silla
- Interactive map of Silla
- Country: Estonia
- County: Lääne County
- Parish: Lääne-Nigula Parish
- Time zone: UTC+2 (EET)
  - Summer (DST): UTC+3 (EEST)

Silla is a village in Lääne-Nigula Parish, Lääne County, in western Estonia.

== Name ==
The name Silla means 'bridge' in Estonian (cf. the common noun sild, genitive silla 'bridge'). The village is located along the middle course of the Liivi River, along the highway from Risti to Virtsu, where there was a bridge at the end of the road to Teenuse. The village was attested in the first half of the 16th century as Szilla with reference to a miller, Szilla Janus 'John of Silla', and in 1798 as Silla referring an inn and mill.
