= Kullamaa =

Village in Estonia

Coordinates: 58°53′N 24°05′E

- Village
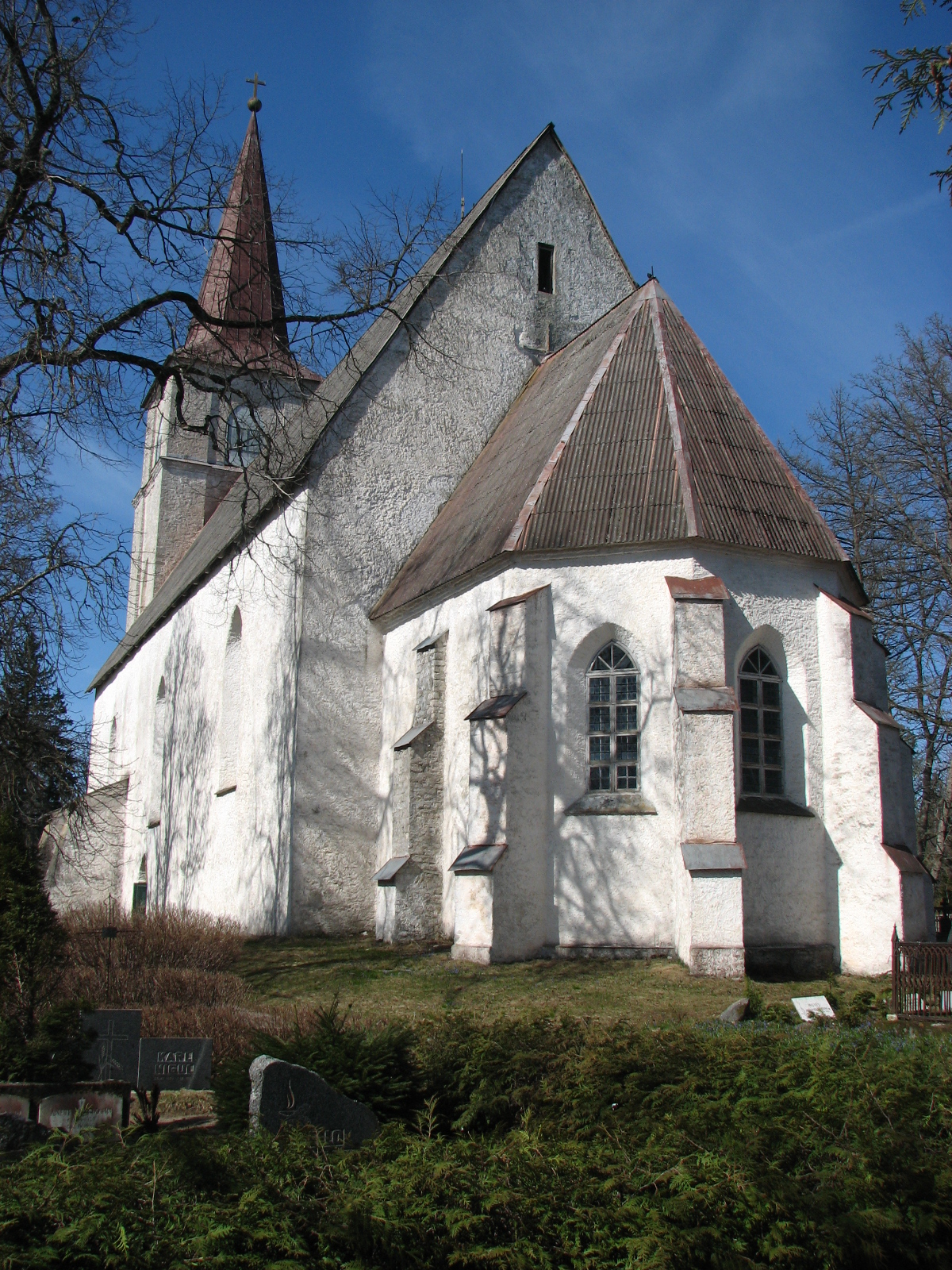
- Kullamaa church
- Interactive map of Kullamaa
- Country: Estonia
- County: Lääne County
- Parish: Lääne-Nigula Parish

Population (2020)
  - Total: 247
- Time zone: UTC+2 (EET)
  - Summer (DST): UTC+3 (EEST)

Kullamaa (German: Goldenbeck) is a village in Lääne-Nigula Parish, Lääne County, in western Estonia.

== Church ==
The church dates from the 13th century, and was originally built without a tower. In 1774 the massive buttresses were added to prevent the church from sinking into the soft ground. It was also during the end of the 18th century that the tower was added to the building; the present-day tower however dates from 1870. During the 19th century the church also received a new choir.

The interior includes a late-Renaissance pulpit, a Baroque calvary group, Baroque epitaphs and tombstones, and an altar-painting from late 19th century.

Duchess Augusta of Brunswick-Wolfenbüttel, owner of nearby Koluvere Castle and estranged first wife of King Frederick I of Württemberg, is buried in the church.

== Pharmacy ==
On July 30, 1886, one of the oldest rural pharmacies in Estonia was founded by Oskar Mildebrath at Kullamaa. It stayed in business continuously for 122 years, until 2008.

== Notable people ==
The first Estonian professional composer, Rudolf Tobias (1873–1918), lived in Kullamäe between 1885 and 1889, where his father served as the parish clerk. Later, the composer Artur Uritamm served as the church organist.

The pastor and translator Heinrich Göseken (1612–1681) worked as a pastor at Kullamaa Church. He is credited with writing a grammar of Estonian as well as a Latin–Estonian–German dictionary.

== Gallery ==
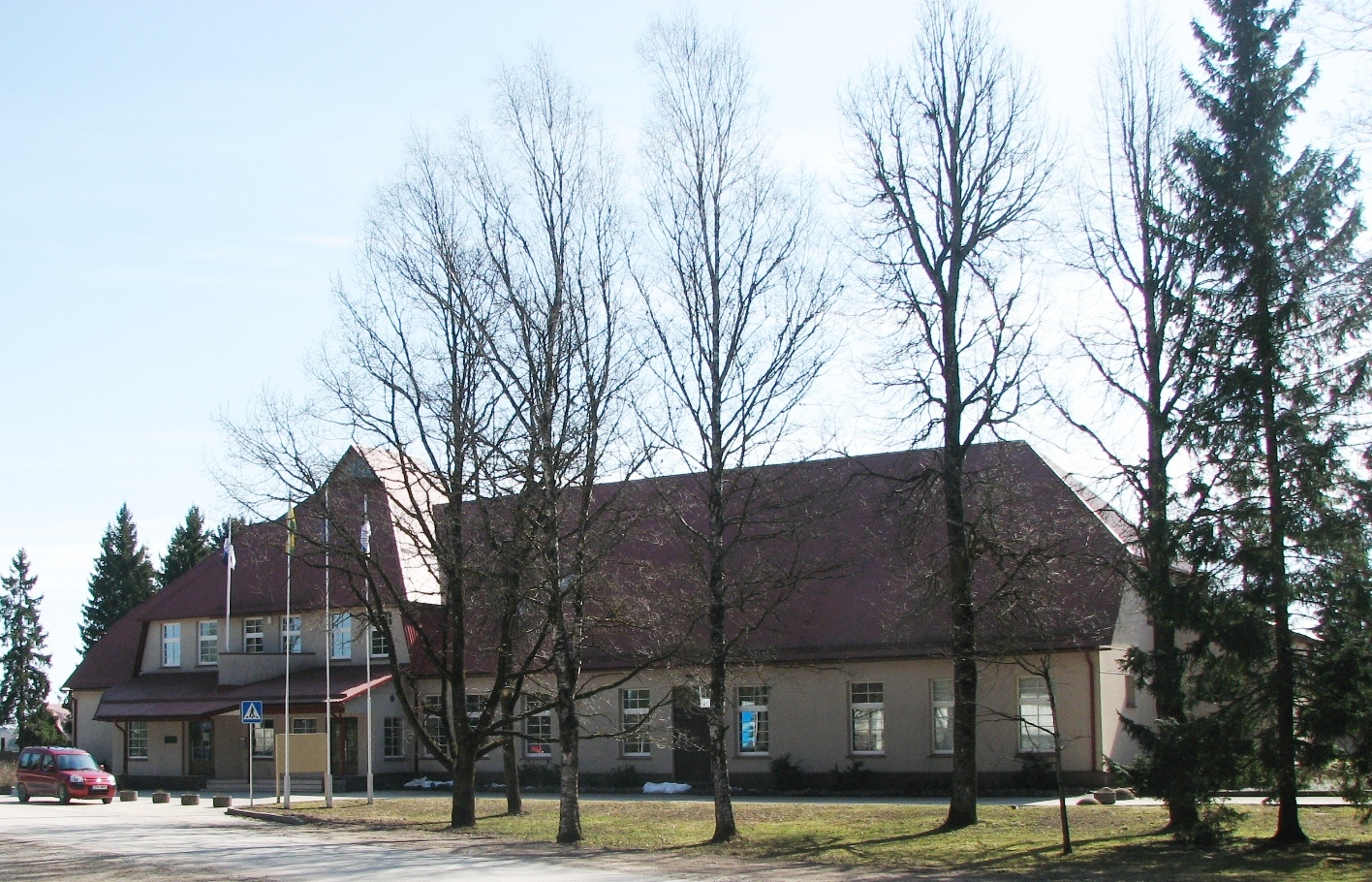
Municipal administration building

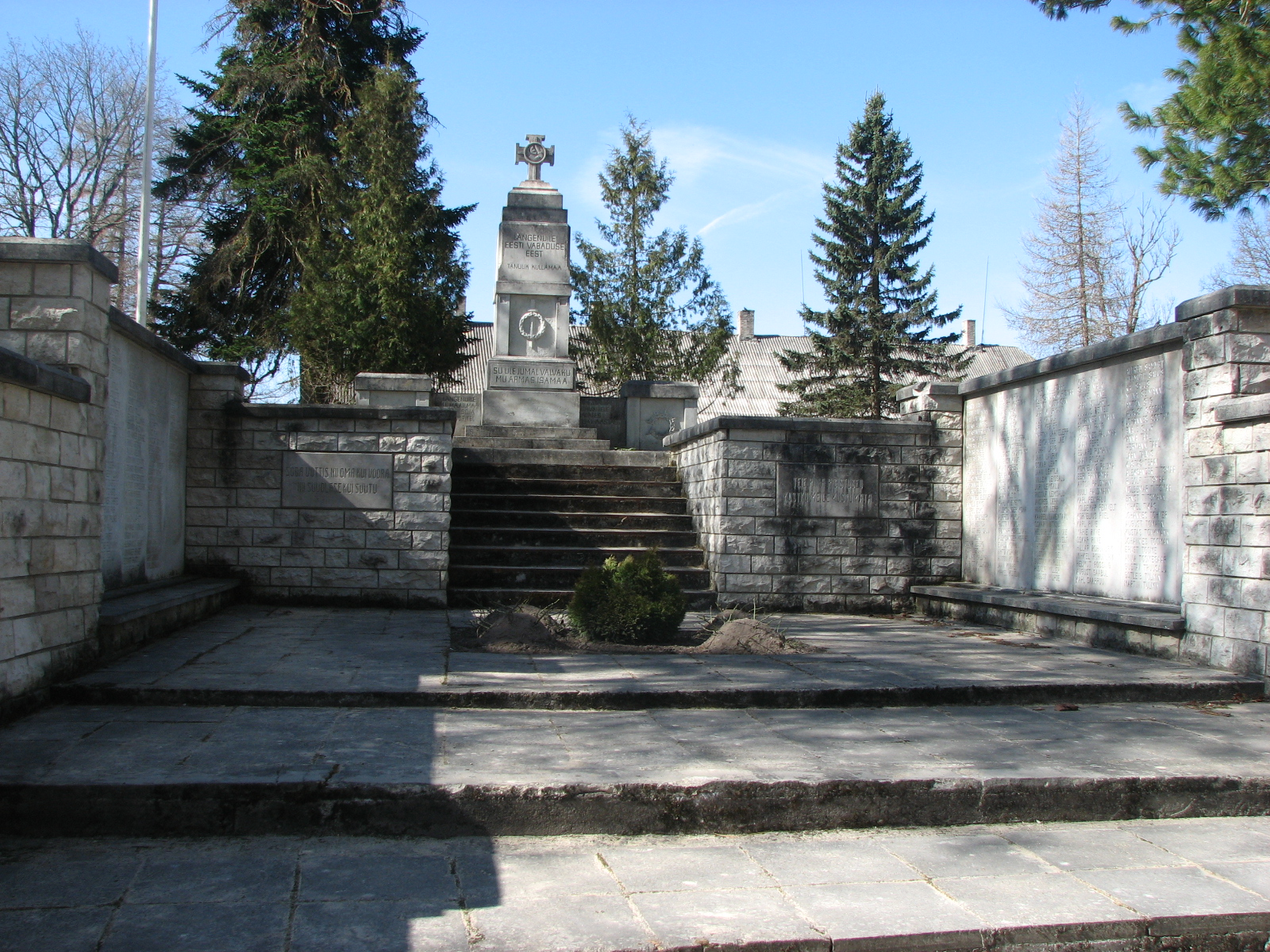
Estonian War of Independence memorial

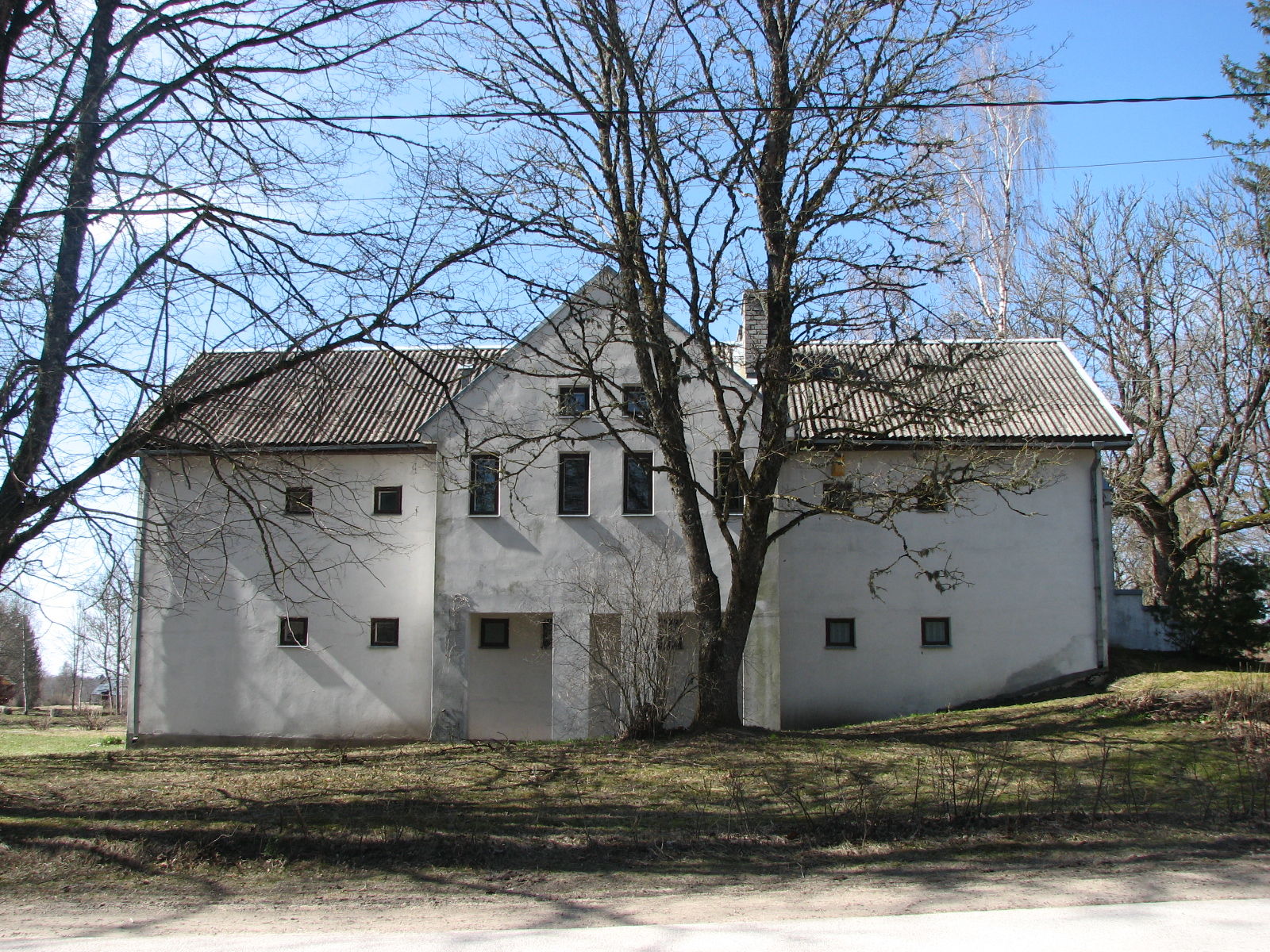
Pastorate building

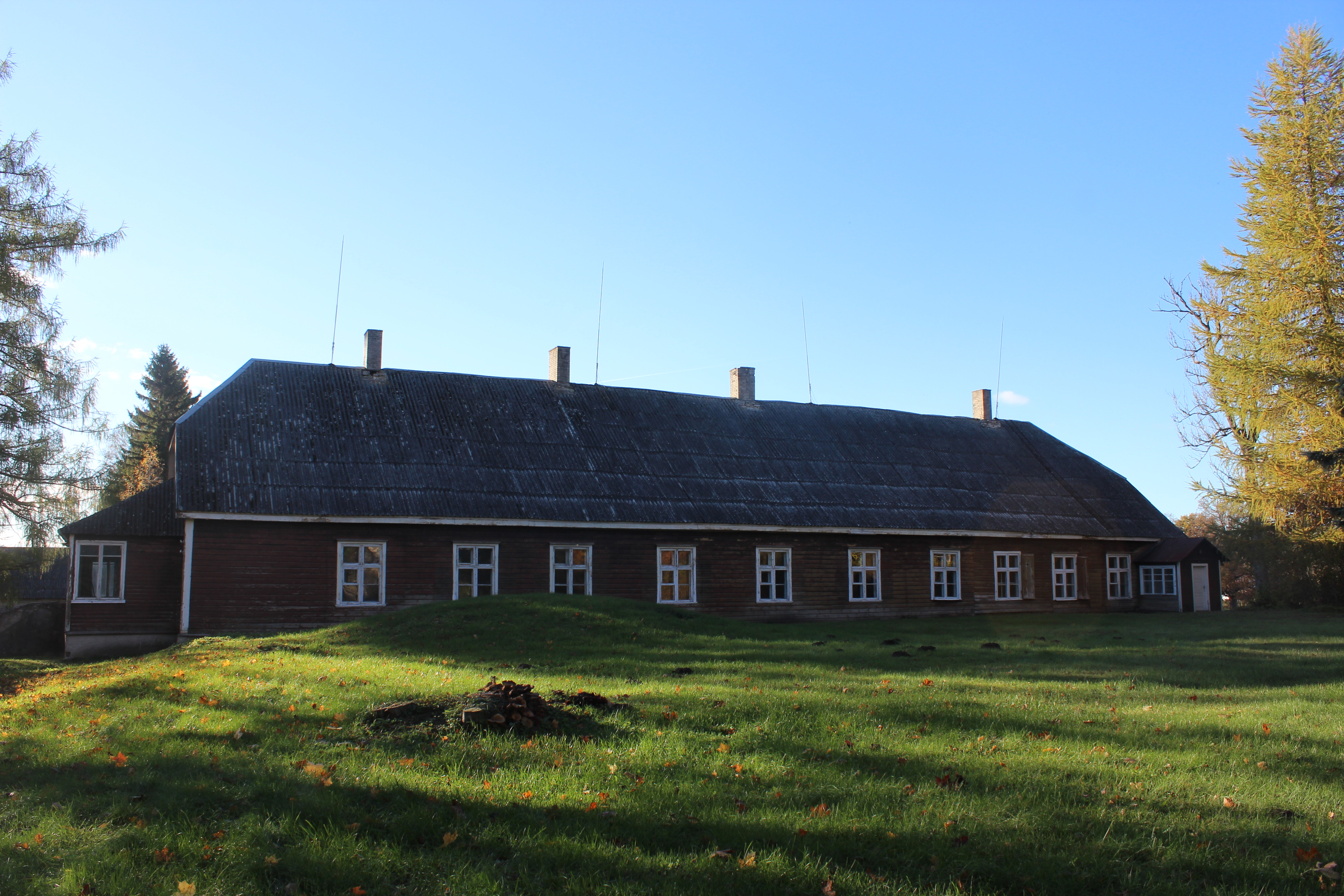
Kullamaa church manor rectory
