= Battle of Lode =

1573 military conflict in Estonia during Livonian War

- Part of Livonian War
| Date | 23 January 1573 |
| Location | Koluvere, near Lode in Estonia 58°54′20″N 24°06′15″E |
| Result | Swedish victory |

Belligerents
| Sweden | Tsardom of Russia |

Commanders and leaders
| Clas Åkesson Tott | Simeon Bekbulatovich |

Strength
| 1,600–2,000 | 16,000 |

Casualties and losses
| Minimal | 7,000 killed (likely exaggerated); 100 horses captured All of the artillery captured |

The Battle of Lode was fought during the Livonian War, between a Swedish and Russian army on 23 January 1573, near the town of Lode (now Koluvere). The battle was won by the Swedes.

== Background ==
In the utumn of 1572, the Russian army began an offensive into the Baltic region, with Russian forces besieging Weissenstein. After heavy bombardment, the Russians successfully stormed and captured the city on January 1. Afterwards, part of the Russian army departed along with the Tsar to Novgorod, and the remaining Russian forces in Estonia were divided into two, with one capturing Karkus, and the other, numbering around 16,000 men, was assigned to capture Lode, Leal, and Hapsal. The Swedish detachment that faced this latter army numbered about 1,600< menref name=":1" />–2,000

== Battle ==
When Clas Åkesson Tott realized that the Russian Army was divided, he marched out from Reval with around 700 knights along with a few hundred cavalry from the Baltic to attack the Russian army besieging Lode. On 23 January, the Russian and Swedish armies met outside of Lode, with the Russian army being led by Simeon Bekbulatovich.

The Baltic cavalry received orders to assault the Russians and was quickly able to tear into the Russian formations. Despite their success, the cavalry decided that the Russian force was too strong and retreated. Despite this, Clas decided that he could take advantage of the confusion that had begun in the Russian lines and advanced with his knights, which proved decisive. Upwards of 7,000 casualties are said to have been suffered by the Russians, although this number is likely highly exaggerated.

== Aftermath ==
After the battle, Tott was able to return to Reval with all of the Russian artillery, 100 horses, and a large number of saddles, while his own casualties are said to have been minimal. However, despite the large victory gained by Tott, it was not followed by additional Swedish successes.

== Sources ==
- Sundberg, Ulf: Svenska krig 1521-1814, p. 78, Hjalmarson & Högberg Bokförlag, Stockholm 2002, ISBN 91-89660-10-2
- Anders Anton von Stiernman, Swea och Götha Höfdinga-Minne, Volym 2
- Fridolf Ödberg, Tidsbilder ur 1500-talets svenska häfder, C. E. Fritzes kungl. hofbokhandel, 1896
- Сказанія князя Курбскаго, Андрей Михайлович Курбский
