= Leila, Estonia =

Village in Estonia

Leila
- Village
- Interactive map of Leila
- Coordinates: 58°55′49″N 24°04′28″E
- Country: Estonia
- County: Lääne County
- Parish: Lääne-Nigula Parish
- Time zone: UTC+2 (EET)
  - Summer (DST): UTC+3 (EEST)

Leila (German: Leilis) is a village in Lääne-Nigula Parish, Lääne County, in western Estonia.
