= Arthur von Buxhoevden =

Baltic German military personnel

- Born: 28 March 1882; Saare County
- Died: 27 September 1964 (aged 82); Karlsruhe, Baden-Wurttemburg, West Germany
- Occupation: military colonel

Grave of von Buxhoeveden and his wife Kira at the Defence Forces Cemetery of Tallinn.

Peter Eugen Arthur Baron von Buxhoeveden (28 March 1882 Muratsi manor, Saare County – 27 September 1964 Karlsruhe) was a Baltic-German military colonel who served in the forces of the Imperial Russian Army and Estonia.

== Education ==
He graduated from Kuressaare Gymnasium and Tver Cavalry School (Estonian: Tveri ratsaväekool).

== Career ==
He participated on World War I, being an officer for Czarist Russia.

In 1918, he entered Saaremaa Defence Forces (Estonian: Saarte Kaitseliit). He participated on Estonian War of Independence, fighting for Estonia. From 1920 until 1928, he was the commander of Cavalry NCOs' School (Estonian: Ratsaväe allohvitseride kool). In 1928 he retired.

== Death ==
In 1939, he moved to Germany and died in Karlsruhe in 1964. On 12 September 2014, the ashes of von Buxhoevden and his wife Kira (née Scheidemann) were buried in the Defence Forces Cemetery of Tallinn.

== Significance ==
Von Buxhoevden was one of the leading persons to advance the integration of Baltic Germans into Estonian society.

== Awards ==
- 1920: Cross of Liberty, I class II rank.
- 1925: Order of Lāčplēsis, III class
