= Reinhold von Buxhoeveden =

Prince-bishop in Livonia (d. 1557)

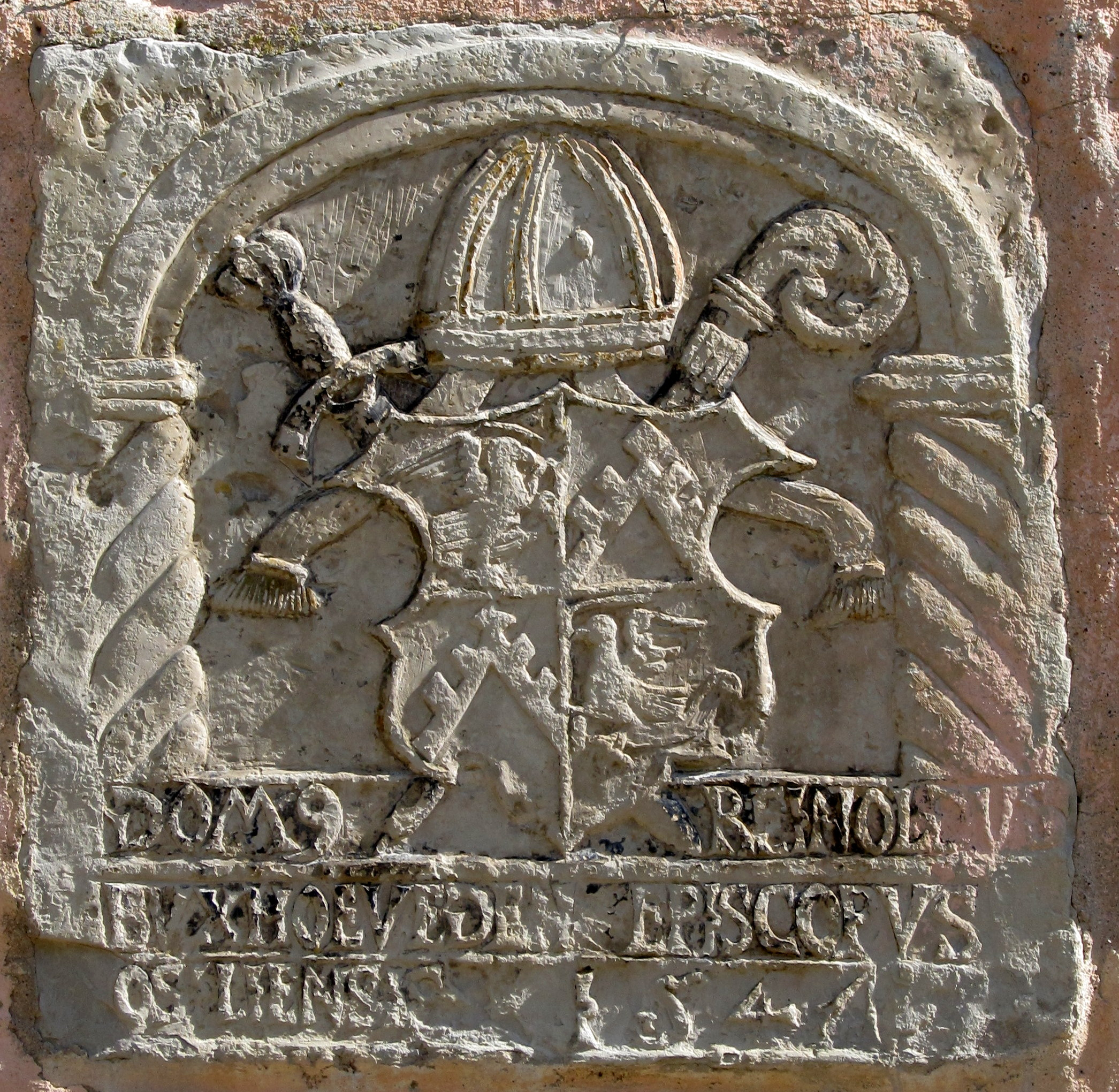
Coat of arms of Reinhold von Buxhoeveden at Koluvere castle.

Reinhold von Buxhoeveden (died 1557) was bishop of the Bishopric of Saare-Lääne or Ösel–Wiek (Estonian: Saare-Lääne piiskopkond; German: Bistum Ösel–Wiek; Low German: Bisdom Ösel–Wiek; contemporary Latin: Ecclesia Osiliensis), a semi-independent Roman Catholic prince-bishopric in what is now Saare, Hiiu and Lääne counties of Estonia, from 1532 to 1541.

He was the second member of the Buxhoeveden family to serve as bishop of Saare-Lääne. Buxhoeveden is believed to have been born in the early 1480s and matriculated into Rostock University in 1501. In 1506 he was awarded a Master of Arts (magister artiumi) degree with canonical rights. He proceeded to prepare for a career in the religious ministry, and had the fortune of being accepted as a ministerial candidate in Rome. It is not known how long he was in Rome, but upon his departure he was named canon of Tartu and Saare-Lääne dioceses, and no later than 1519 he returned to Livonia. There he was named bishop of Tartu and became a close assistant to Johannes Blankenfeld, the future archbishop of Riga. On 13 November 1519 he was named archdeacon of the Saare-Lääne bishopric. In the following years he spent little time in Livonia, but rather became Blankenfeld’s ambassador to Pope Leo X. From 1520 on, he returned occasionally to Saaremaa and Tartu. In 1527, upon the death of Saare-Lääne bishop Johannes IV Kievel, Buxhoeveden should have gained enough influence to be named his successor. This however did not come to fruition, as he was tied politically to Blankenfeld who was suspected of wanting to cede Livonia to the Russians. Thus, Buxhoeveden remained archdeacon for three more years. On 18 October 1530 he was elected bishop by the Saare-Lääne chapter and knights, despite two votes against him by the Läänemaa vassalage. Emperor Charles V confirmed him as bishop in December 1531, and the Pope did so on 3 August 1532. However, before word of his confirmation reached Livonia, civil broke out in Saare-Lääne.

During the Saare-Lääne civil war (1532–1536), Buxhoeveden had to compete with Wilhelm von Hohenzollern, the coadjutant of the archbishop of Riga, who had moved to the Läänemaa region. Buxhoeveden won out in the end, but at great financial cost, and commitments to the influential families in the Läänemaa vassalage. These factors led to many conflicts in the Saare-Lääne bishopric in the early 1540s.

Buxhoeveden resigned from his position sometime before 13 July 1541. By this time, he had gained strong influence with the Livonian Order. With this influence he was able to get the bishop of Kuramaa, Johann von Münchhausen, appointed as his successor.

Buxhoeveden died some time before 7 May 1557 at the bishop’s residence at Koluvere castle.

== Sources ==
- Leonid Arbusow sr., Livlands Geistlichkeit vom Ende des 12. bis ins 16. Jahrhundert. Mitau (Jelgava), 1900. (in German)
- Jüri Kivimäe, Piiskop ja Hansakaupmees: "Reinhold von Buxhövdeni ja Johann Selhorsti kaubasuhetest 1530. aastate algul." In: Sõnadesse püütud minevik: in honorem Enn Tarvel. Tallinn: Argo, 2009, pages 138-158 (in Estonian)

| Preceded by Georg von Tiesenhausen | Prince-Bishop of Ösel–Wiek (Saare-Lääne); 1532–1541 | Succeeded by Johannes von Münchhausen |
