= Liivi =

Village in Estonia

Coordinates: 58°51′N 23°58′E

- Village
- Interactive map of Liivi
- Country: Estonia
- County: Lääne County
- Parish: Lääne-Nigula Parish
- Time zone: UTC+2 (EET)
  - Summer (DST): UTC+3 (EEST)

Liivi (German: Parmel) is a village in Lääne-Nigula Parish, Lääne County, in western Estonia.

== Name ==
Liivi was attested in historical documents in 1732 as Liwi. The name is derived from the surname of the owners of Liivi Manor, Live or Lieven. The manor was attested in 1389, when Hincke Live became its owner. The German name of the village, Parmel, is also derived from a surname (Parmele), which is assumed to be of Estonian origin.
