= Liivi (river) =

River in Estonia

Liivi River
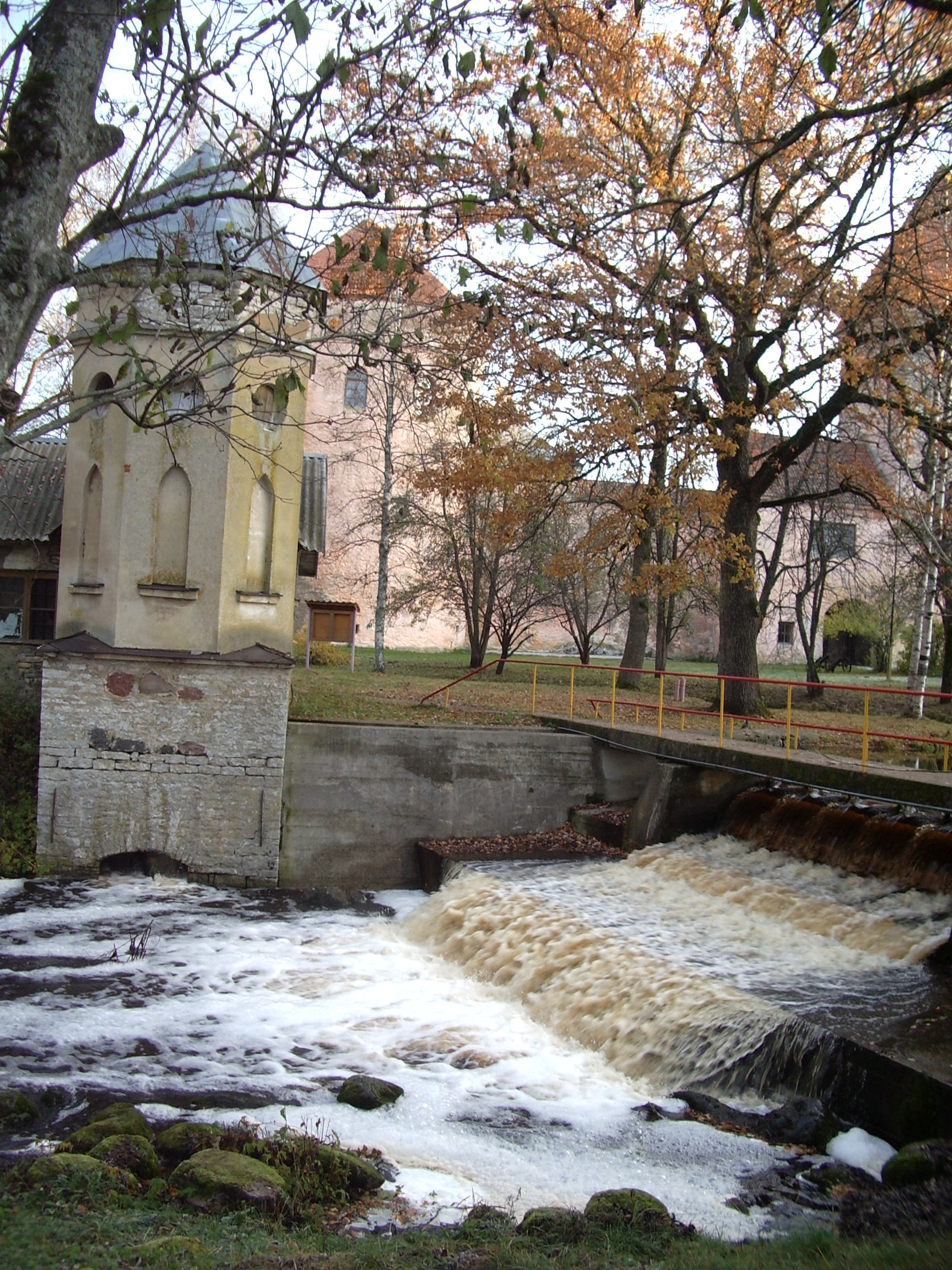

Location
- Country: Estonia

Physical characteristics
- Mouth: Kasari River
  - coordinates: 58°45′03″N 23°57′51″E
- Length: 51.1 km
- Basin size: 252.7 km²

The Liivi River is a river in Lääne County, Estonia. The river is 51.1 km long, and its basin size is 252.7 km^{2}. It discharges into the Kasari River.
