= Koluvere, Lääne County =

Village in Estonia

Koluvere
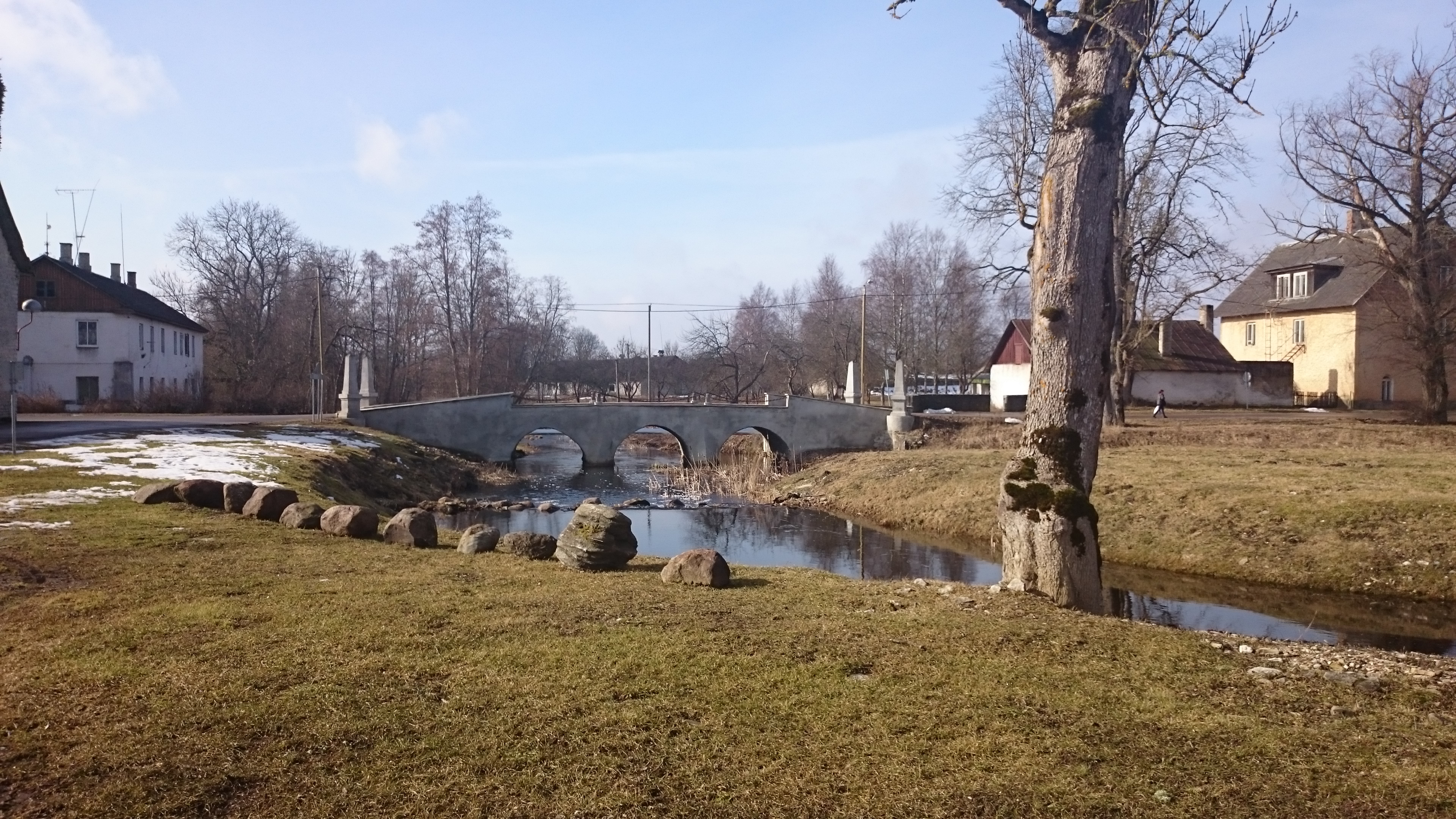
- Liivi River in Koluvere

- Location within Estonia
- Coordinates: 58°54′19″N 24°6′30″E
- Country: Estonia
- County: Lääne County
- Time zone: UTC+2 (EET)

Koluvere is a village in Lääne-Nigula Parish, Lääne County in western Estonia.

Koluvere castle is located in Koluvere.

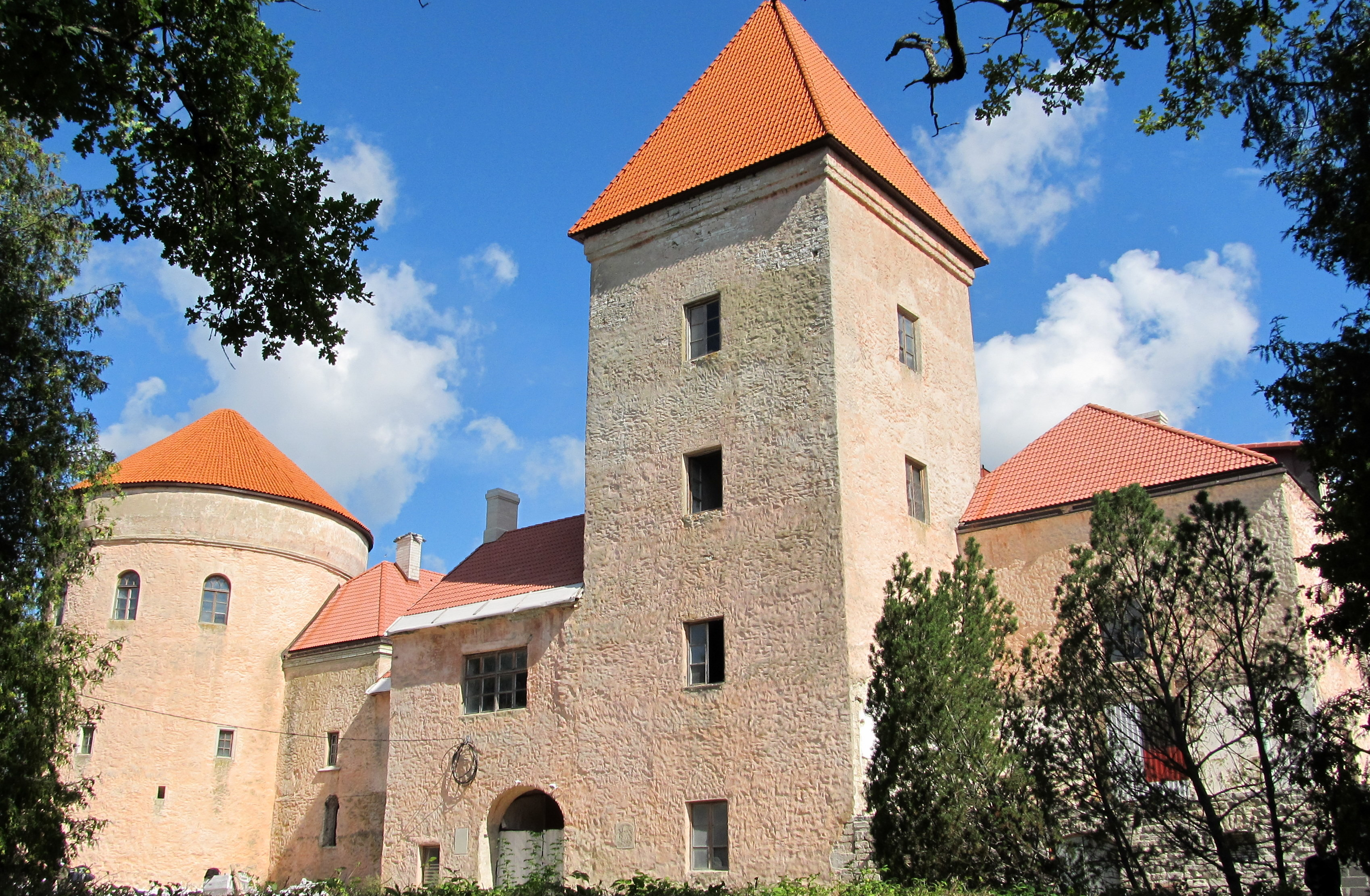
Koluvere Castle

== See also ==
- Battle of Lode
