= Bexhövede =

- Ortsteil of Loxstedt
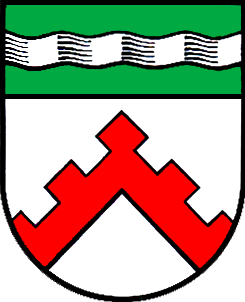
- Coat of arms

- Location within Loxstedt
- Interactive map of Bexhövede
- Location within Germany Location within Lower Saxony
- Coordinates: 53°29′N 8°40′E
- Country: Germany
- State: Lower Saxony
- District: Cuxhaven
- Municipality: Loxstedt

Area
  - Total: 12.34 km^{2} (4.76 sq mi)
- Elevation: 12 m (39 ft)

Population (2020-12-31)
  - Total: 2,285
  - Density: 185.2/km^{2} (479.6/sq mi)
- Time zone: UTC+01:00 (CET)
  - Summer (DST): UTC+02:00 (CEST)
- Postal codes: 27612
- Dialling codes: 04703
- Website: http://www.bexhövede.de

Bexhövede is a village in the Cuxhaven district of Lower Saxony, Germany which was incorporated into the municipality of Loxstedt in 1974. It is well known for being the origin of the noble Buxhoeveden family.

Its population as of the 2011 census is 2,100 residents.

== Name ==
The name "Bexhövede" comes from the Old Saxon "Buxhoevede" and means "origin of the brook" or "water source." The bek, or stream from which Bexhövede gets its name is portrayed as a wavy bar on the chief of the town's coat of arms. The lower half of the escutcheon is derived from the arms of the Buxhoeveden family.

== Notable residents ==
- Albert of Riga (c.1165–1229), Founder of Riga, builder of city's cathedral, third Bishop of Riga in Livonia. Founder of the Livonian Brothers of the Sword
- Hermann of Dorpat (1163–1248) First Prince-Bishop of the Bishopric of Dorpat within the Livonian Confederation

== See also ==
- Buxhoeveden family
