= Vigala Parish =

Former municipality of Estonia

Coordinates: 58°43′N 24°23′E

Vigala Parish Vigala vald
- Former municipality of Estonia
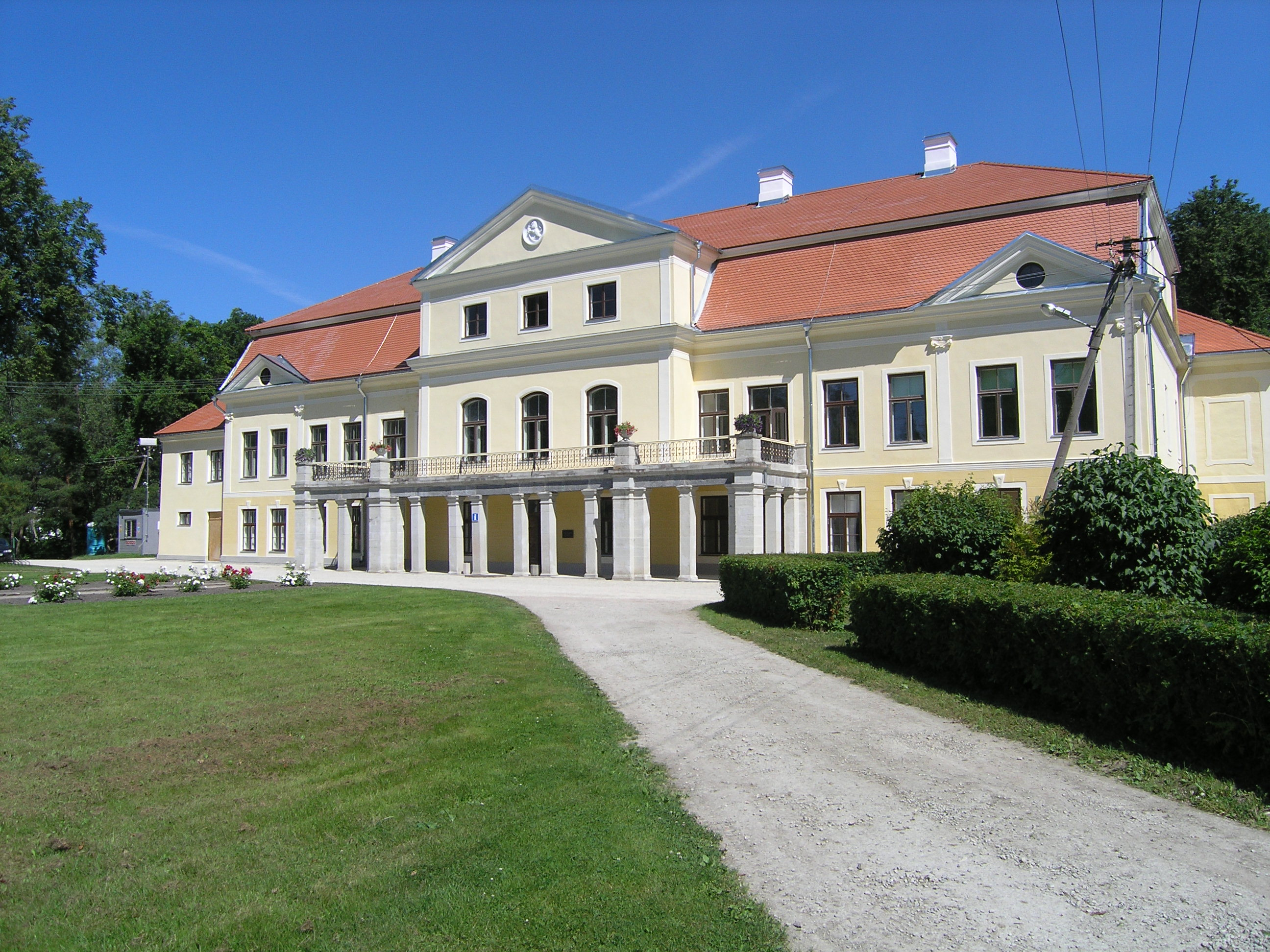
- Vana-Vigala manor

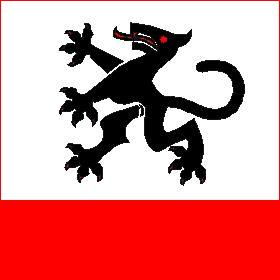
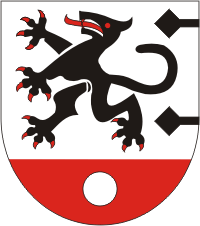
- Flag Coat of arms

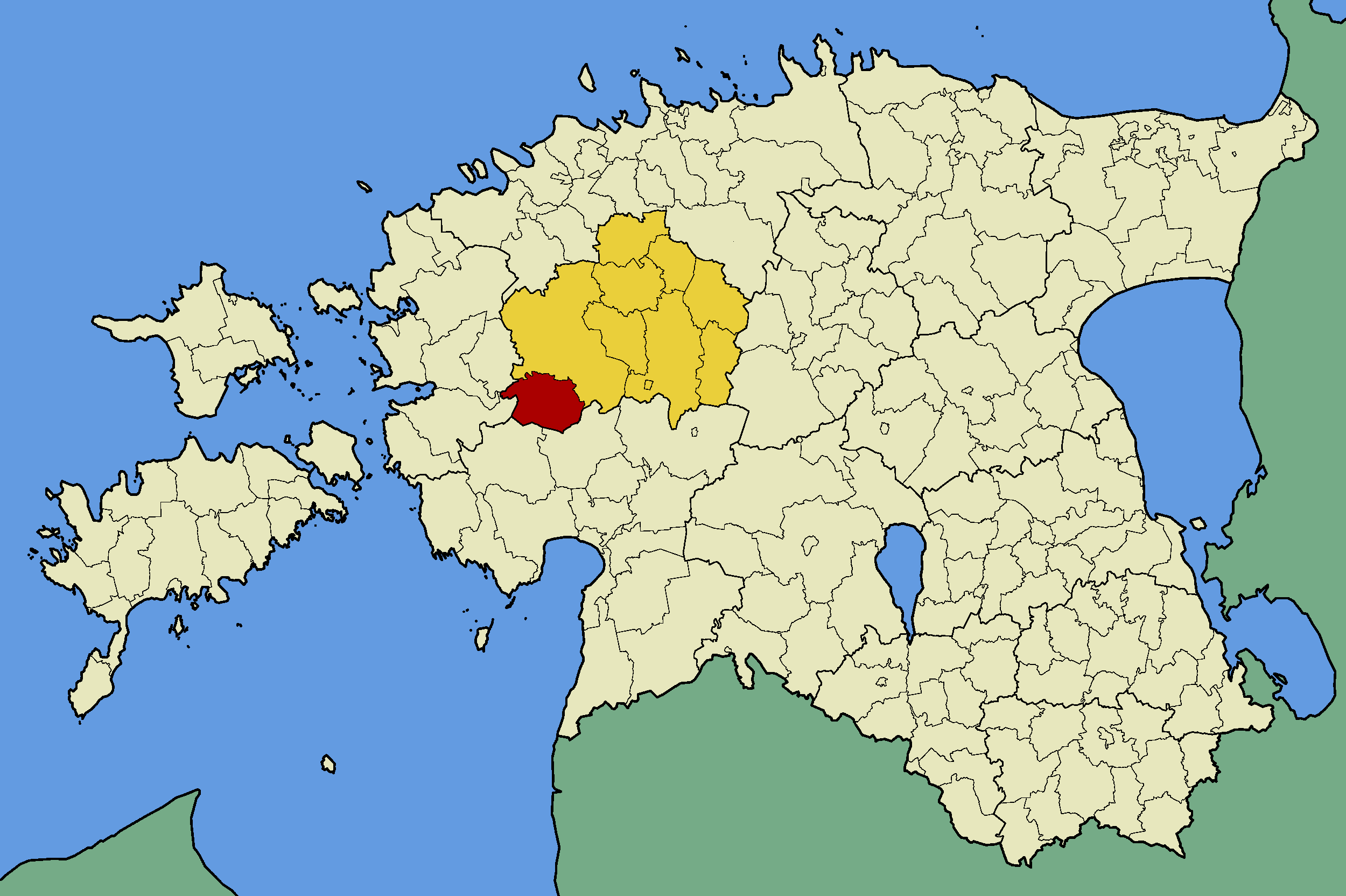
- Vigala Parish within Rapla County.
- Country: Estonia
- County: Rapla County
- Administrative centre: Kivi-Vigala

Area
  - Total: 269.81 km^{2} (104.17 sq mi)

Population (01.01.2010)
  - Total: 1,507
  - Density: 5.585/km^{2} (14.47/sq mi)
- Website: www.vigala.ee

Vigala Parish (Estonian: Vigala vald) was an Estonian municipality located in Rapla County. It had a population of 1,547 (as of 1 March 2008) and an area of 269.81 km^{2}.

== Settlements ==
Villages

Araste - Avaste - Jädivere - Kausi - Kesu - Kivi-Vigala - Kojastu - Konnapere - Kurevere - Läti - Leibre - Manni - Naravere - Oese - Ojapere - Päärdu - Paljasmaa - Palase - Pallika - Rääski - Sääla - Tiduvere - Tõnumaa - Vaguja - Vanamõisa - Vana-Vigala - Vängla
