= Matthias Johann Eisen =

Estonian folklorist and clergyman (1857–1934)

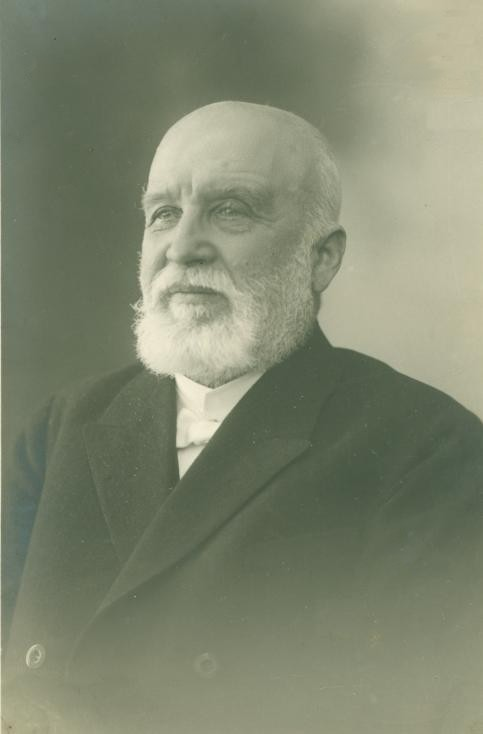
- Matthias Johann Eisen photographed c. 1920-1930 by Heinrich Riedel
- Born: September 28, 1857; Oese village, Vigala Parish, Rapla County, Estonia
- Died: August 6, 1934 (aged 76); Tartu, Estonia
- Resting place: Maarja Cemetery, Tartu
- Citizenship: Estonia
- Education: University of Tartu (1885)
- Occupations: Folklorist, clergyman, ethnologist, university teacher
- Employer: University of Tartu
- Known for: Systematic collection of Estonian folklore
- Notable work: Esivanemate varandus [Ancestral Treasure] Eesti mütoloogia [Estonian Mythology]
- Awards: Honorary doctor of the University of Tartu; Honorary doctor of the University of Helsinki

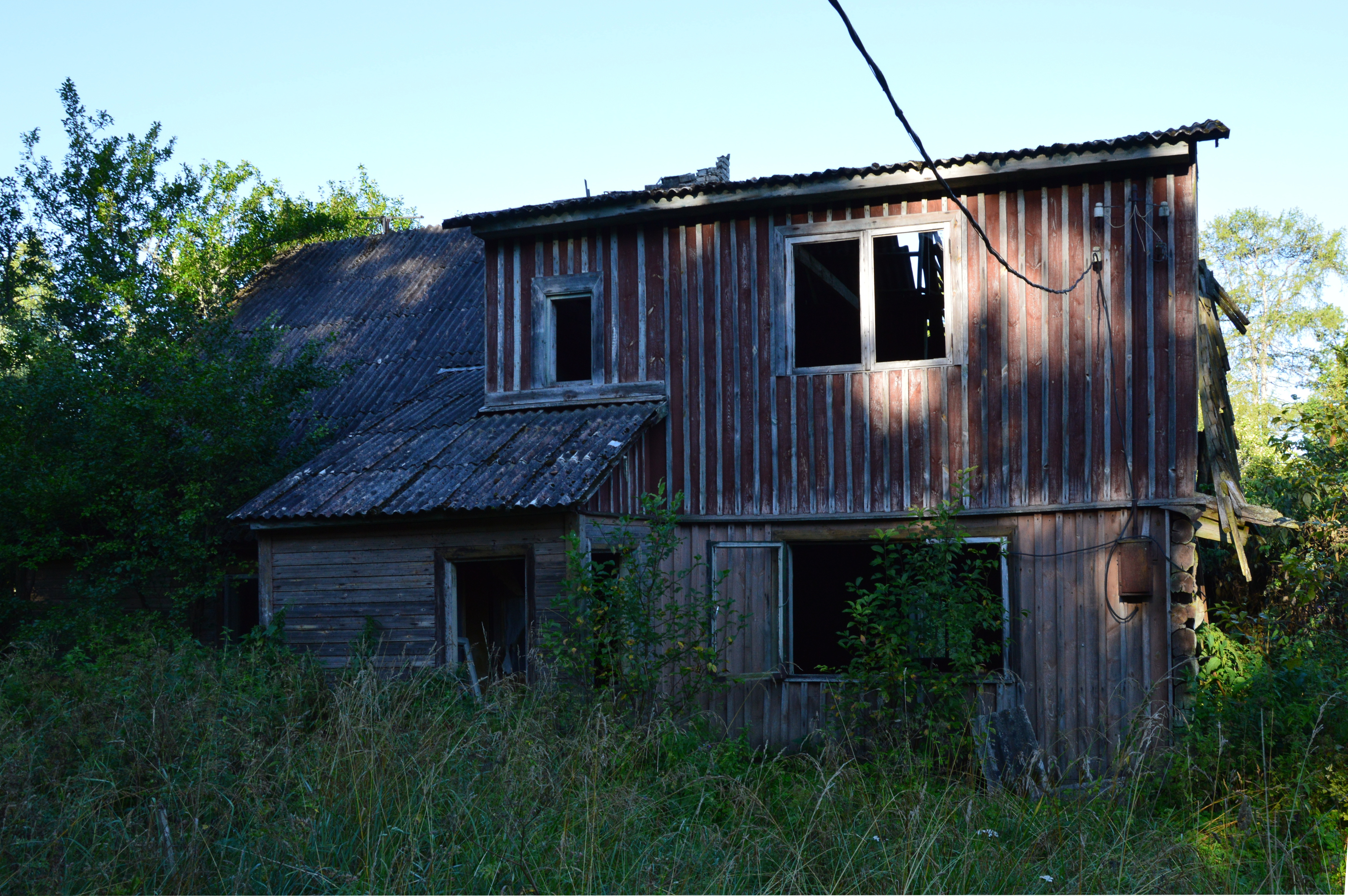
Childhood home of Matthias Johann Eisen Oese village, Vigala Parish, Rapla County

Matthias Johann Eisen (also published under the name M. J. Eisen; 28 September 1857 – 6 August 1934) was a prominent Estonian folklorist and clergyman whose life's work centred on the preservation of national heritage.

He was a translator and poet. Eisen’s most enduring legacy lies in his effort to document Estonian folklore. He is best known for his thorough collection and systematic typology of Estonian folk tales, totaling over 90,000 pages.

His work significantly influenced later Estonian literature and his folklore materials have been used by authors such as Andrus Kivirähk. He has also been described as the founder of Estonian science fiction.

== Early life ==
Eisen as a young visiting clergyman, c. 1880–1890

Eisen was born in Oese village, in Vigala Parish, Rapla County, Estonia to a schoolteacher. He pursued theological studies in Haapsalu and Pärnu before graduating from the University of Tartu in 1885.

He was heavily influenced by his parents' nationalism and by Estonian nationalism that grew during the Estonian national awakening and the preservation of oral heritage. From a young age, he began contributing to the newspaper Perno Postimees as a student and became a dedicated member of the Estonian Students' Society and the Estonian Writers' Society.

Eisen's literary and scholarly career began during his years as a student in Pärnu and Tartu. Alongside Jaan Jung, he was a proponent of the Estonian term for history (ajalugu), and he played a key role in promoting it during the 1870s.

== Career ==
Eisen photographed by Heinrich Tiidermann c. 1896–1903

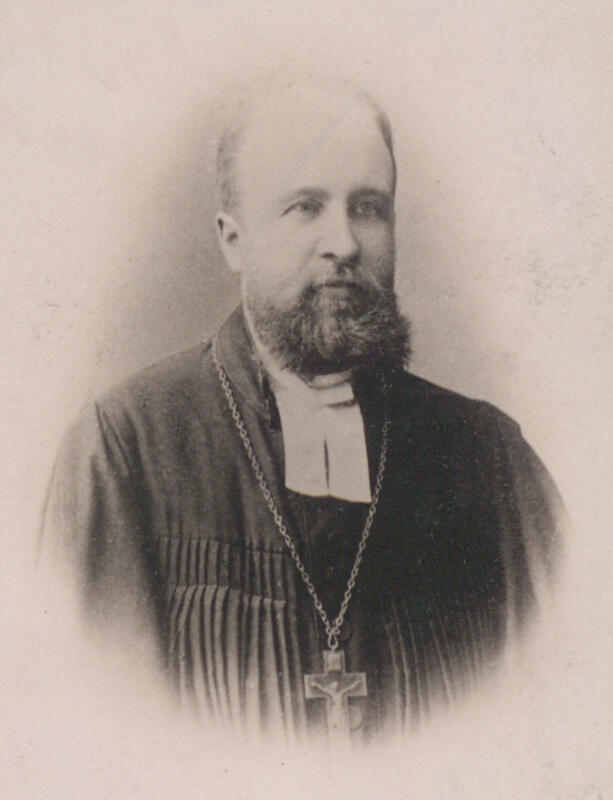
Eisen photographed by Wilhelm Staden c. 1890–1900

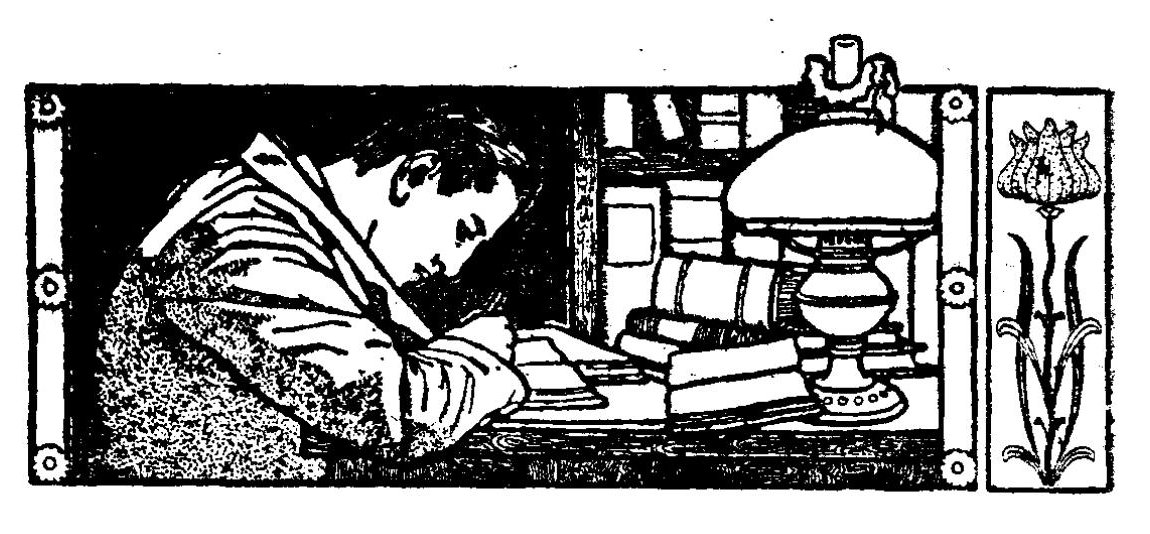
A still from Eisen's Eesti-, Liiwi- ja Kuramaa ajalugu [History of Estonia, Livonia, and Courland] (1913)

He was ordained as a pastor in Lempaala, Ingria, in 1886. He served in Petrozavodsk and Kattila before moving to Kronstadt. There he served as a parish priest for the multi-ethnic St. Nicholas congregation in Kronstadt for over two decades.

In 1913, he returned to Tartu. Although offered a position in Finland by the Finnish Literature Society in 1919, he chose to donate his folklore collection to the University of Tartu in exchange for a personal professorship.

From 1920 to 1927, he served as a professor of folk poetry at the University of Tartu. In 1925, he helped establish the Academic Folklore Society and served as its long-term chairman. His academic contributions were later recognized with an honorary doctorate in theology from his alma mater in 1932.

He was an honorary doctor of philosophy at the University of Helsinki (1927), an honorary doctor of theology at the University of Tartu (1932), and an honorary alumnus of the Estonian Students' Society (1930).

== Works ==
=== Folklore collection ===
As a university student, Eisen published his first major collections: the folktales ‘Esivanemate varandus’ ("Ancestral Treasure", 1882) and Endise põlwe pärandus ("The Inheritance of the Former Generation," 1883). He also contributed to the 1881 poetry anthology Eesti luuletused ("Estonian Poems") and played a key role in compiling and publishing Eesti rahva mõistatused ("Riddles of the Estonians", 1889). In 1892, Eisen and his colleagues launched a massive effort to manually document Estonian folklore, a project that continued for the rest of his life. His work occasionally paralleled and supplemented the efforts of Jakob Hurt. By the time of his death, Eisen's archive contained over 17,000 folk songs and 25,000 tales. These were often published as "national books" to make them affordable. These widely circulated editions were designed to make folk heritage accessible to the general public.

He published a history of Estonia, Livonia, and Kurland (titled Eesti-, Liiwi- ja Kuramaa ajalugu, in 1913, a work he continued to refine and expand throughout his life. He conducted significant research into the Danish Census Book which resulted in him publishing Daani hindamise raamat [Danish Appraisal Book] in 1920. His scholarly interests also extended to lyric epics.

=== Poetry and epics ===
Eisen published six primary collections of poetry between 1876 and 1902, including Lehekuuõied ("The Flowers of May", 1876) and Laulik ("Bard", 1902). His verse was heavily influenced by his background in folkloristics, frequently employing the ethereal tone and structural trends of epic folk poetry rather than dense, content-rich lyrics. This style is most prominent in his narrative poems Kuldja (1923) and Kaks Kuningapoega which was called Two Princes in English (1925).

He also worked extensively on lyric epics and mythological reconstructions. He versified the myths and legends of Friedrich Robert Faehlmann. He also wrote the pseudo-mythological epic Kõu ja Pikker (meaning Thunder and Lightning). His folkloric materials were a primary source for Andrus Kivirähk's novel Rehepapp. Between 1891 and 1898, he produced the first Estonian translation of the Finnish national epic, the Kalevala.

=== Other writings ===
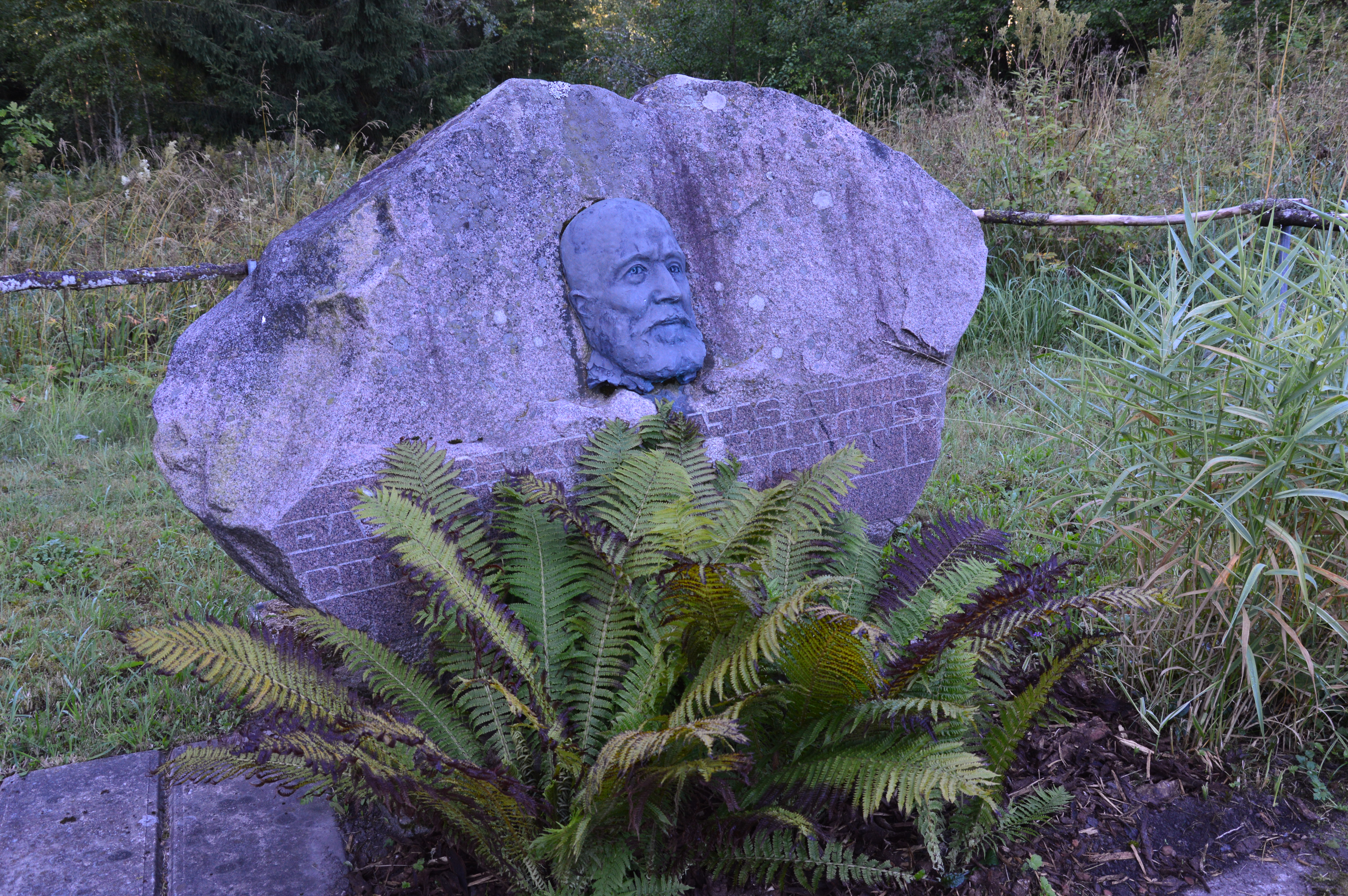
Memorial stone marking the birthplace of Matthias Johann Eisen in Oese, Rapla County

In addition to his folkloric and poetic work, Eisen co-authored a six-part biographical series titled Tähtsad mehed ("Important Men") between 1883 and 1884. He also wrote rudimentary plays as a tool for moral education.In 1903, he published "Tallinn in the Year 2000", which led historian Hillar Palamets to label him the founder of Estonian science fiction.

=== Selected bibliography ===
Eisen was a prolific author whose bibliography spans folklore, history, theology, and fiction. Many of his works went through multiple expanded editions. A full list of works can be found at the Matthias Johann Eisen entry in the Estonian Writers' Online Dictionary. The following works are available in the original Estonian at Wikisource (Vikitekstid).

- Endise põlwe pärandus [The Inheritance of the Former Generation] (1883)
- Wanapagana jutud [Tales of the Old Heathen] (1893)
- Krati-raamat [The Kratt Book] (1895)
- Luupainaja [Nightmare] (1896)
- Kodukäijad [The Revenants] (1897)
- Tallinnas aastal 2000 [In Tallinn in the Year 2000] (1903)
- Kuninga-jutud [King Tales] (1906, 2nd ed.)
- Eesti-, Liiwi- ja Kuramaa ajalugu [History of Estonia, Livonia, and Courland] (1913)
- Eesti mütoloogia [Estonian Mythology]

1. Eesti mütoloogia (1919)
2. Eesti uuem mütoloogia (1920)
3. Esivanemate ohverdamised (1920)
4. Eesti vana usk (1926)

- Esivanemate varandus. [Ancestral Treasure]

1. ‘Esivanemate varandus. Kohalised Eesti muinasjutud’ [Ancestral Treasure: Local Estonian Folk Tales]. (2002)
2. ‘Esivanemate varandus. II, Kodused jutud’ [Ancestral Treasure II: Homely Tales]. Tartu (2002)
3. ‘Esivanemate varandus. III, Narvast Tallinna’ [Ancestral Treasure III: From Narva to Tallinn] (2002)

- Daani hindamise raamat [Danish Appraisal Book] (1920)
- Tõll ja ta sugu [Tõll and His Kin] (1927)
- Eesti vanasõnad [Estonian Proverbs] (1929, 2nd ed.)
- Meie jõulud [Our Christmas] (1931)
Selected works by M.J. Eisen

Endise põlwe pärandus, 1883

Krati-raamat, 1895

Eesti mütoloogia, 1919

Tõll ja ta sugu, 1927
