= Kadapiku =

Kadapiku may refer to several places in Estonia:

- Kadapiku, Kadrina Parish, village in Lääne-Viru County, Estonia
- Kadapiku, Tapa Parish, village in Lääne-Viru County, Estonia

== See also ==
- Kadarpiku, village in Lääne-Nigula Parish, Lääne County, Estonia
