= Lati =

Lati or LATI may refer to:

- Lati, Iran (disambiguation), places in Iran
- Läti (disambiguation), Estonian places
- Tirana International Airport Nënë Tereza, from its ICAO code
- Lake Area Technical Institute, in South Dakota, US
- LATI (airline), a transatlantic airline operating between Italy and South America between 1939 and 1941

== See also ==
- Läti (disambiguation)
