= Oese =

Oese or OESE may refer to:

- Oese, Pärnu County, a village in Halinga Parish, Pärnu County, Estonia
- Oese, Rapla County, a village in Vigala Parish, Rapla County, Estonia
- Oese (Hönne), a river in North Rhine-Westphalia, Germany, tributary of the Hönne
- Öse, a river in North Rhine-Westphalia, Germany, tributary of the Nethe (the umlaut Ö may be spelled as Oe)
- Office of Elementary and Secondary Education (OESE), a division of the United States Department of Education
