= Mihkel Aitsam =

Estonian writer and historian (1877–1953)

- Born: December 1, 1877; Sääla, Governorate of Estonia, Russian Empire
- Died: June 17, 1953 (aged 75); Kivi-Vigala, then part of Estonian SSR, Soviet Union
- Occupations: Writer, historian

Mihkel Aitsam (December 1, 1877 – June 17, 1953) was an Estonian writer, journalist, and historian.

== Biography ==
Aitsam was born on December 1, 1877, at the Aitsamaa farm in Sääla, Wiek County, in the Governorate of Estonia (present-day Rapla County, Estonia), the son of Mihkel Aitsam (1833–1913) and Mari Aitsam (née Laasi, 1846–1915). Aitsam started contributing to the newspaper Valgus in 1893, and later he also wrote for Eesti Postimees and Olewik. In 1904, some of his short stories were published in Teataja and also in several other political newspapers that he contributed to. Aitsam participated in the Russian Revolution of 1905. In 1906, when his father's farm was destroyed by Russian punishment squads, he settled in Tallinn and, at the invitation of Karl August Hermann, started working in the editorial office of the newspaper Hüüdja, where he remained until the newspaper office closed.

Later, Aitsam worked as an administrator of the Tallinn Estonian Farmers' Association and contributed to several newspapers, including two Russian newspapers in Saint Petersburg. He started working in the editorial office of the Estonian newspaper Päewaleht in 1918. His best-known literary works were Hiiu lossist Siberisse (From Hiiu Castle to Siberia, 1937), Eestimaa kuningas (The King of Estonia, 1939), and Hiislari tütar (The Pagan Priest's Daughter, 1940).

== Works ==
=== Autobiography ===
- 1937: 1905. aasta Läänemaal (1905 in Läänemaa)

=== Historical novels and short stories ===
- 1937: Hiiu lossist Siberisse (From Hiiu Castle to Siberia)
- 1937: Sunnitöölise märgi all (Under the Mark of a Forced Laborer)
- 1938: Metsavennad (The Forest Brothers)
- 1938: Soontagana kanged mehed (Strong Men with Armor)
- 1939: Eestimaa kuningas (The King of Estonia)
- 1939: Laanekotkas (The Golden Eagle)
- 1939: Rahutused Rae mõisas (Unrest at Rae Manor)
- 1940: Hiislari tütar (The Pagan Priest's Daughter)
- 1940: Käskjalg eksiteel (The Messenger Gone Astray)

=== Plays ===
- Four plays, among which the best known is Salmisto (1925)

=== Almanacs and albums ===
- 1937: Eesti Selts "Lootus" 60-aastane (The Estonian Lootus Society: 60 Years)
- 1939: Tallinna Eesti Põllumeeste Selts (The Tallinn Estonian Farmers' Association)
- 1939: EELK Wigala koguduse ja kiriku ajalugu: 1339–1939 (History of Vigala EELC Parish and Church: 1339–1939)

=== Manuscripts ===
- 1905. a revolutsioon ja selle ohvrid Eestis (The 1905 Revolution and Its Victims in Estonia); published in 2011 (Tartu: Ilmamaa)
- Vigala kihelkonna ajalugu (History of Vigala Parish)

=== Articles ===
- 1920: "Tallinna Eesti näituse ajalugu" (History of the Estonian Exhibition in Tallinn). Päewaleht, September 19, page 3
- 1934: "Keiser Nikolai I tütred Kose-Uuemõisas talgutel" (Emperor Nicholas I's Daughters at Work in Kose-Uuemõisa). Päewaleht, December 24, page 9
- 1939: "Rahutused Rae mõisas" (Unrest at Rae Manor). Päewaleht, May 16, page 4

== Awards and recognitions ==
- 1935: Order of the Estonian Red Cross, 3rd class
- 1937: Order of the White Star, 4th class

== Family ==
Mihkel Aitsam married Ann Kops (1884–1960) in 1908. They were the parents of the photographer Mihkel Aitsam (1913–1999) and the grandparents of the journalist Viio Aitsam (born 1955).
