= Pallika =

Pallika may refer to:

- Pallika, Pärnu County, village in Halinga Parish, Pärnu County, Estonia
- Pallika, Rapla County, village in Vigala Parish, Rapla County, Estonia
- Pali, Rajasthan, town in Rajasthan, India; formerly known as Pallika
