= Palase =

Palase may refer to:

- Palasë, a village in Vlorë County, Albania
- Palase, Estonia, a village in Rapla County, Estonia
