= Lati, Iran =

Lati (Persian: لاتي or لتي) may refer to:

- Lati, Ramsar (لاتي - Lātī), Mazandaran Province
- Lati, South Khorasan (لتي - Latī), Mazandaran Province
