= Läti =

Läti may refer to:

- Läti, an Estonian name for Latvia
- Läti, Rapla County, village in Vigala Parish, Rapla County, Estonia
- Läti, Tartu County, village in Ülenurme Parish, Tartu County, Estonia
