= Ants Laikmaa =

Estonian painter (1866–1942)

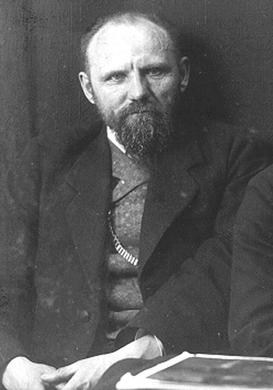
- Ants Laikmaa, c. 1920
- Born: Hans Laipman (until 1935); 5 May 1866; Paiba farm, Araste, Märjamaa Parish, Russian Empire
- Died: 14 December 1942 (aged 76); Kadarpiku, Lääne-Nigula Parish, then part of Generalbezirk Estland
- Education: Düsseldorf Art Academy
- Occupation: Painter
- Known for: pastel painting, co-founder of the Estonian National Museum
- Partner: Marie Under

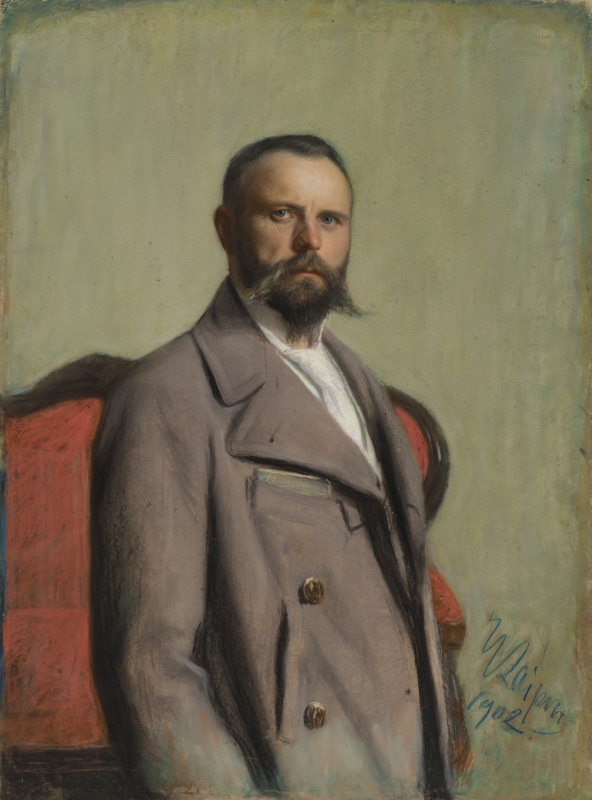
Self-portrait (1902)

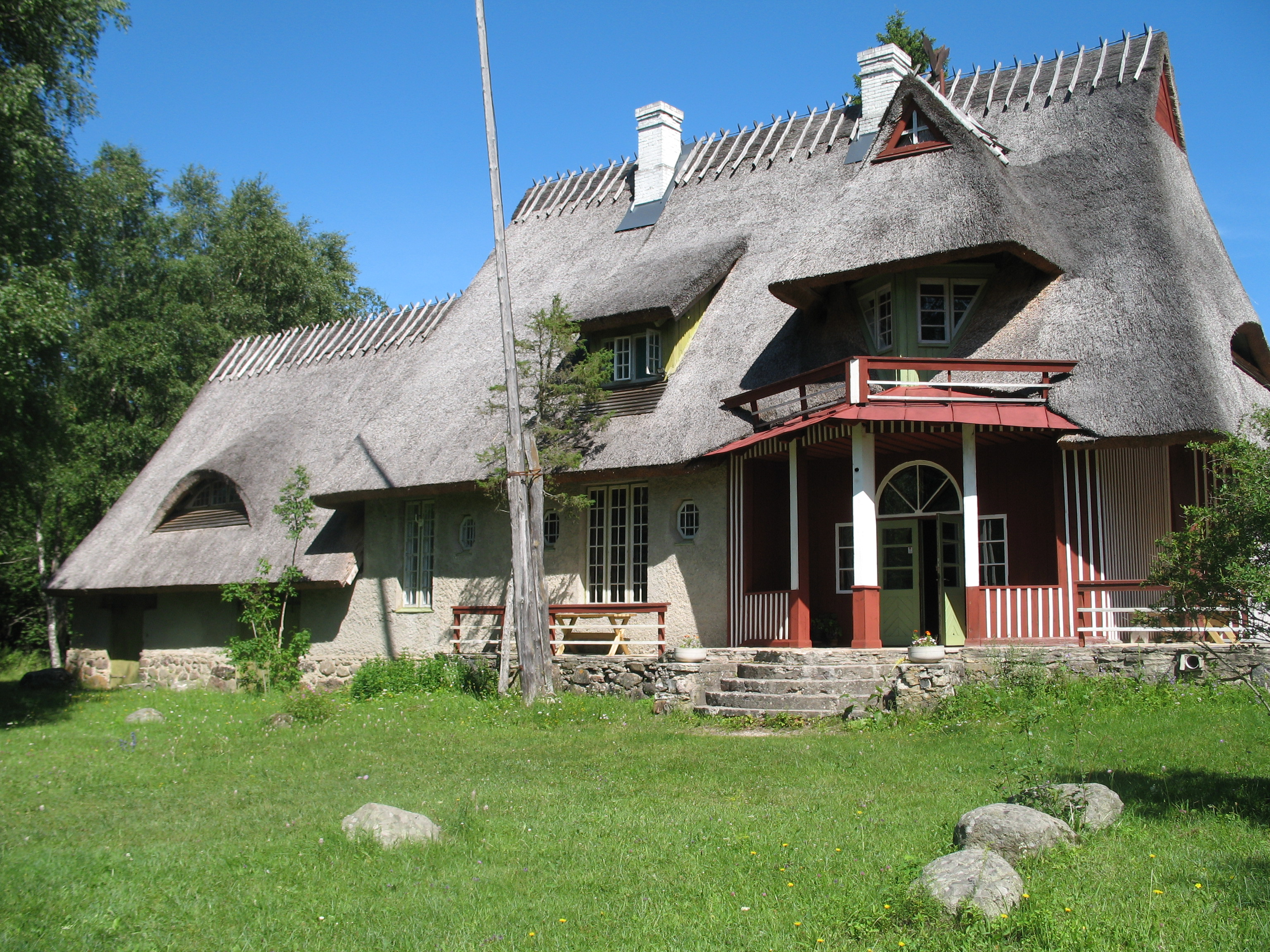
House of Laikmaa in Kadarpiku, designed by himself, now a museum

Ants Laikmaa (5 May 1866, Araste – 19 November 1942, Kadarpiku) was an Estonian painter.

== Life ==
Ants Laikmaa (until 1935 Hans Laipman) was born at the Paiba farm in Araste, Märjamaa Parish village. He was the 13th child of a poor Estonian family. He attended schools in Velise, Haapsalu, and Lihula. His mother died when he was a child. Laikmaa discovered early his interest in painting. He studied from 1891 to 1893 and 1896/97 at the Düsseldorf Art Academy. From 1897 to 1899 he was working in Düsseldorf. He is associated with the Düsseldorf school of painting. In the autumn of 1899, he returned to Tallinn. From 1900 to 1907 Laikmaa worked as an artist in Tallinn and Haapsalu. His study led him to Belgium, France, Austria, Finland, and the Netherlands. In 1901, he organized the first-ever Estonian art exhibition in Tallinn, followed by the first art exhibition in Tartu in 1906. In 1903, he founded a studio in Tallinn, where his students included Otto Krusten. In 1907, he founded the Estonian Art Association (Eesti Kunstiselts).

In 1904, the 38-year-old Laikmaa met the great love of his life, the 21-year-old Marie Under, one of the best-known poets of the time. In the same year, he painted two portraits of her, considered the best-known of Laikmaa's paintings. From 1907 to 1909, he was mainly in Finland. From 1909 to 1913, he traveled to the major art cities in Europe. He lived from 1910 to 1912 in Capri and Tunisia. From 1913 to 1931, Laikmaa worked as a freelance artist and art teacher in Tallinn. Among others, his pupils included the young Alfred Rosenberg. In 1927, his only daughter Aino Marie (later Anu Kilpiö, died 1969) was born, a child of his model nicknamed "Miku". In 1932, Laikmaa settled in Taebla in Lääne County, on his farm in the village of Kadarpiku designed with a 7-hectare park, where he remained and worked until the end of his life. Ants Laikmaa died in November 1942 in Kadarpiku, where he is also buried. Laikmaa remained unmarried all his life. His farm was opened in 1960 as a museum of his life and work.

== Work ==
Ants Laikmaa is best known for his pastel painting. He brought impressionism to Estonia, and often painted landscapes, mostly with sharp colors. His portraits of Estonia's intellectual and artistic elite are also well-known. He was also politically active. Above all, he promoted the training and promotion of Estonian art and was one of the founders of the Estonian National Museum (Eesti Rahva Muuseum) in Tartu.

== Best-known works ==
- Self Portrait (1902)
- Lääne neiu (1903; 'Maiden from Lääne County')
- Portrait of Marie Under (1904)
- Vigala taat (1904; 'Old man from Vigala')
- Portrait of August Kitzberg (1915)

== Gallery ==
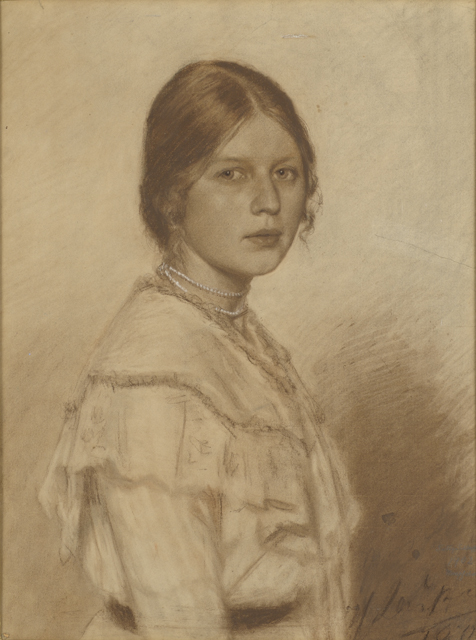
Portrait of a Lady (Tutti Schlaff) (1902)

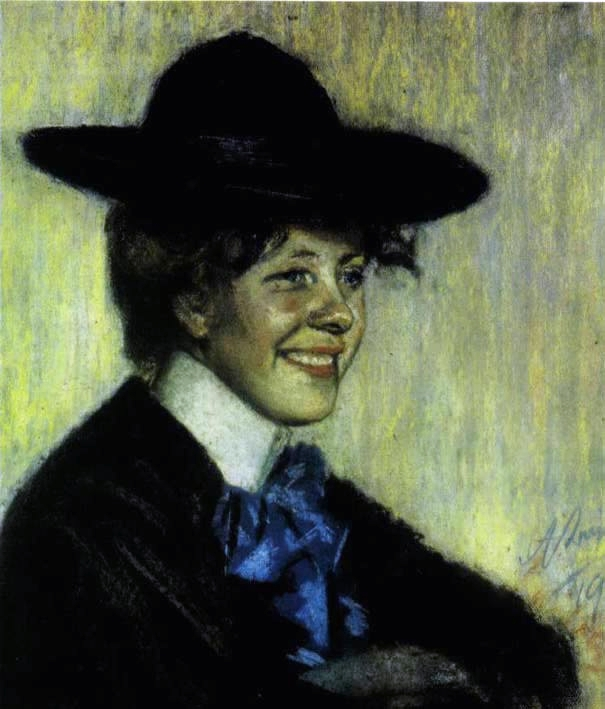
Portrait of Marie Under (1904)

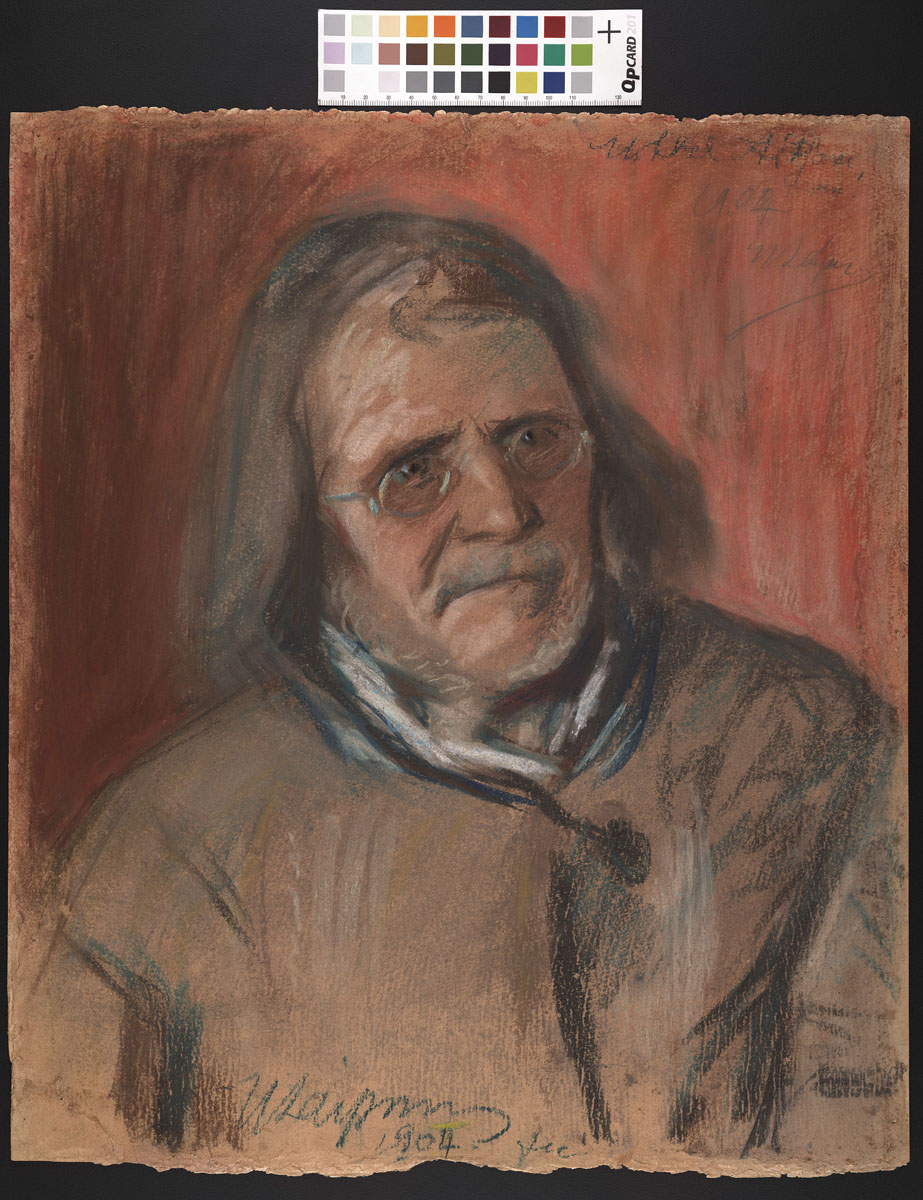
Old Aitsam (1904)

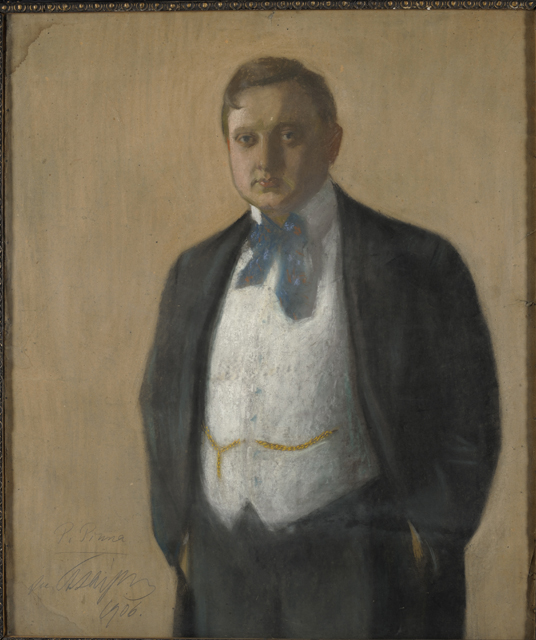
Portrait of Paul Pinna (1906)

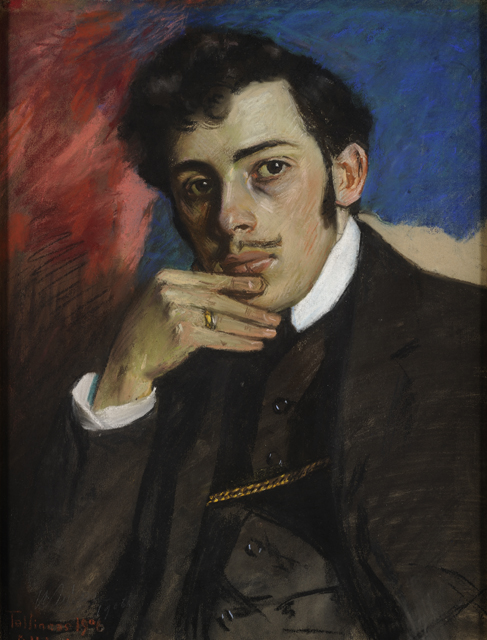
Portrait of Eugen Schäfer (1906)

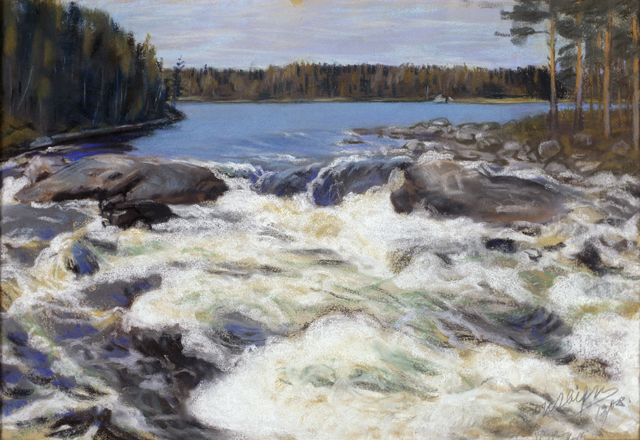
Vallinkoski (1908)

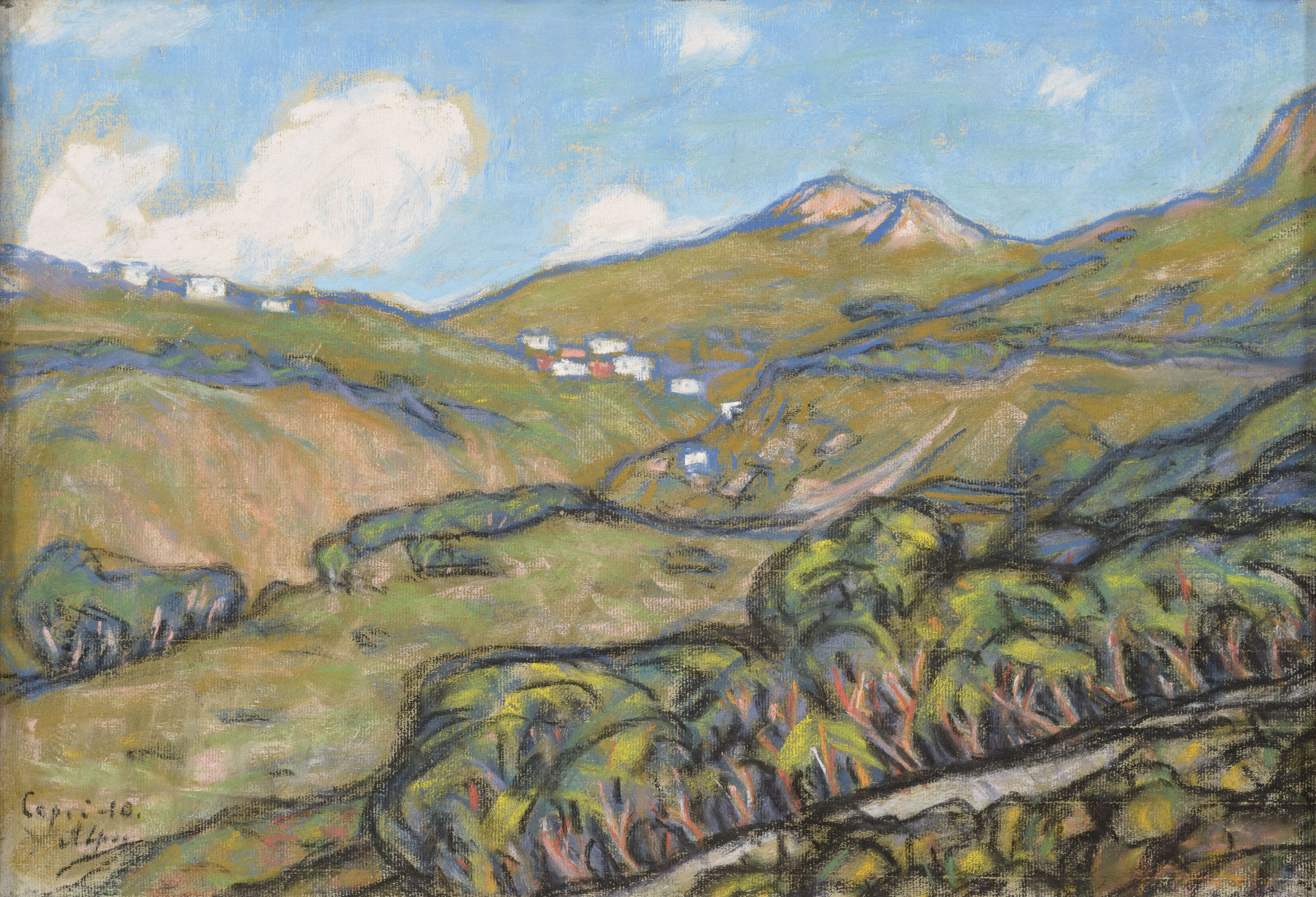
Capri Landscape (1910)

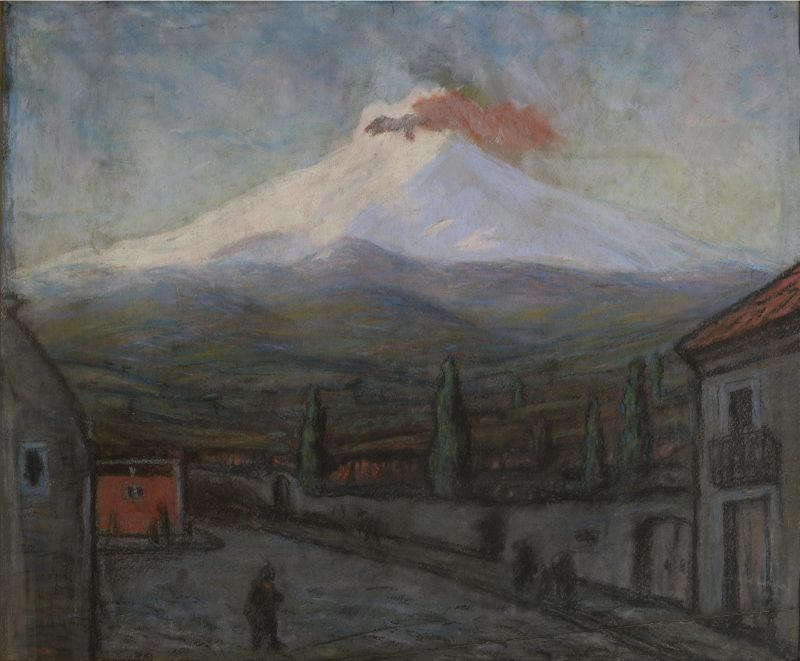
Etna (1910)

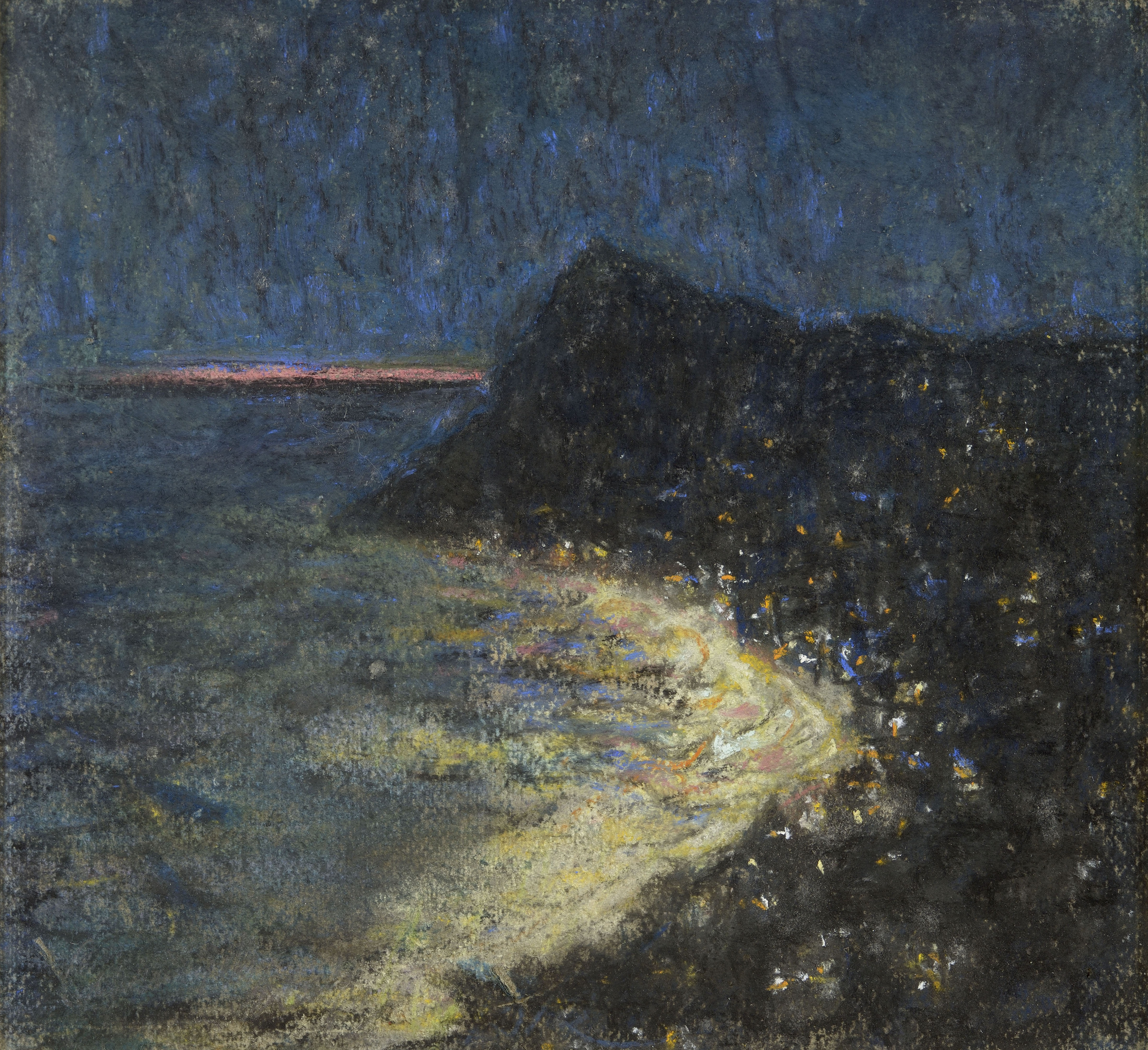
Night Motif from Capri (1910)

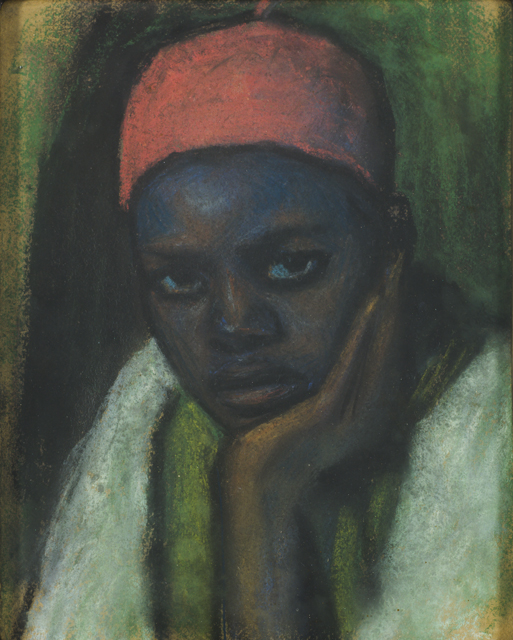
Negro boy (1910–1912)

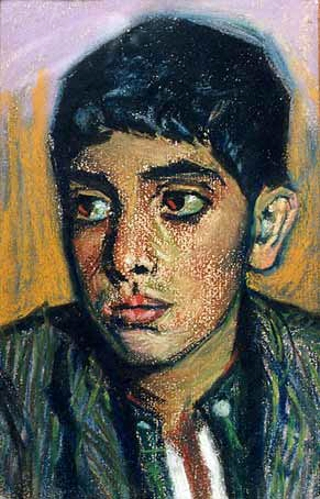
Italian boy (1911)

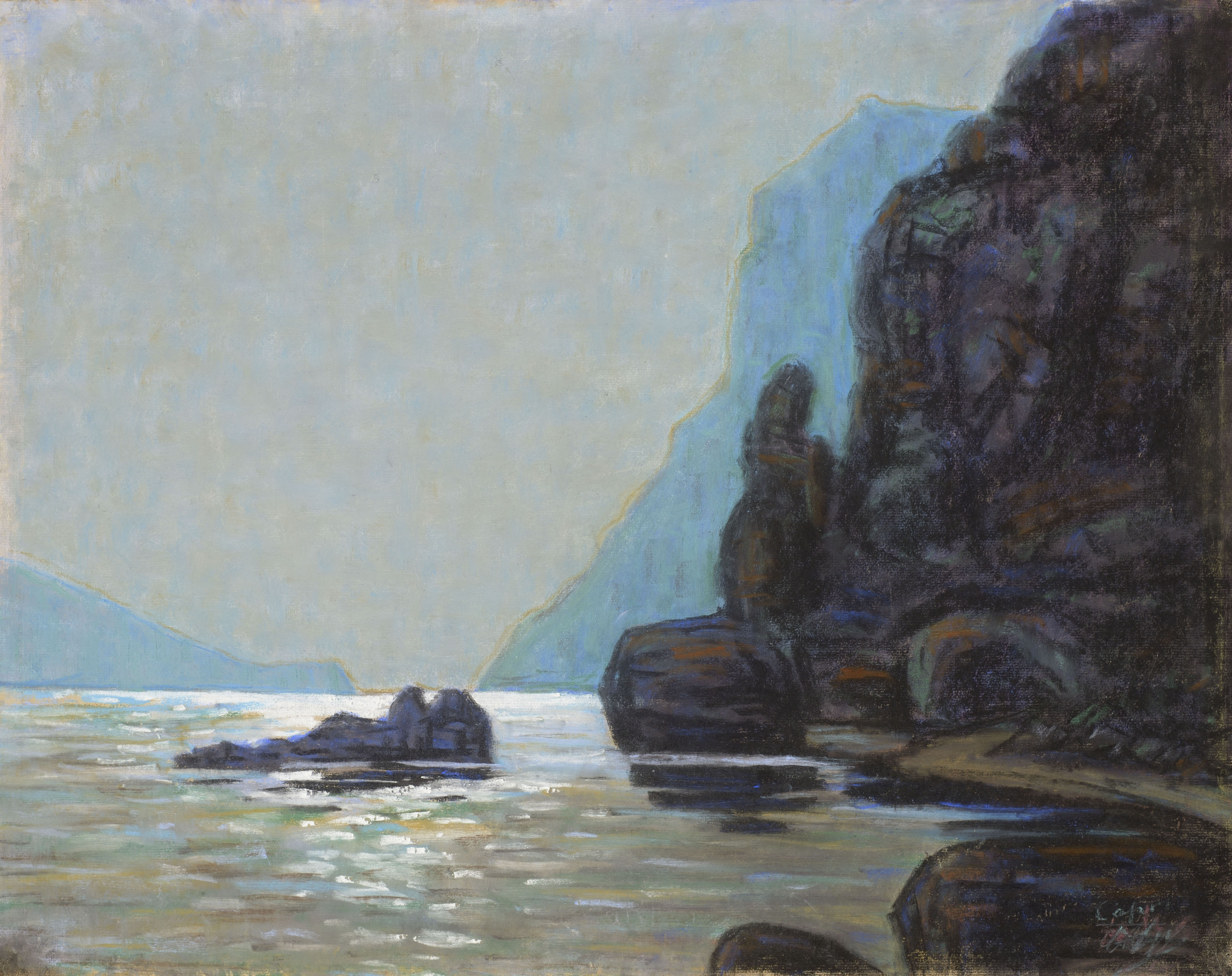
View from Capri (1911–1912)

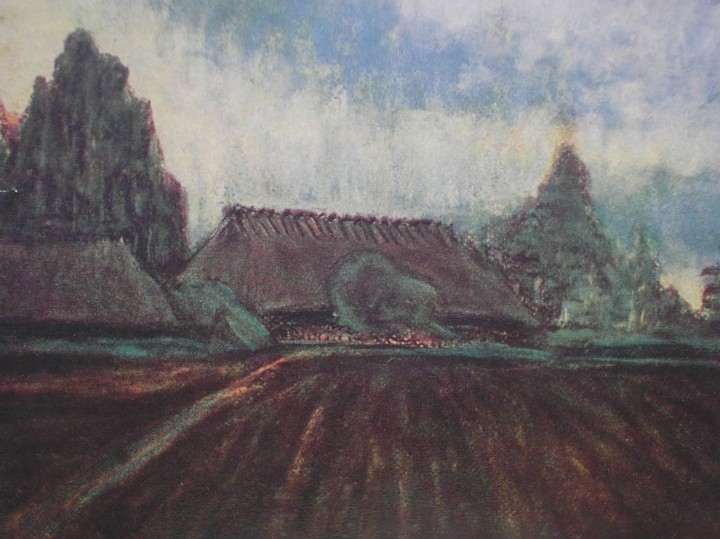
Old farm (1913)

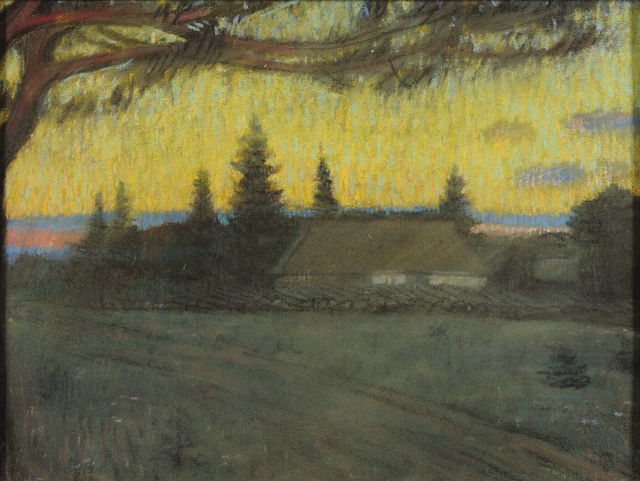
Läänemaa farm (1918)

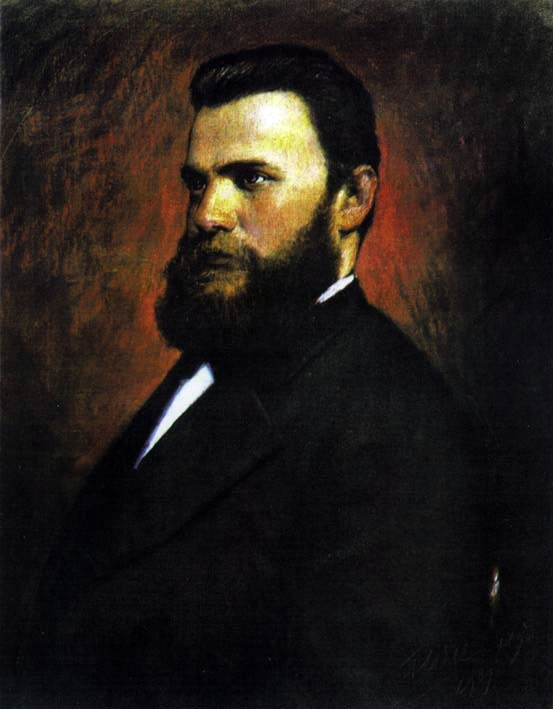
Portrait of Carl Robert Jakobson (1920)

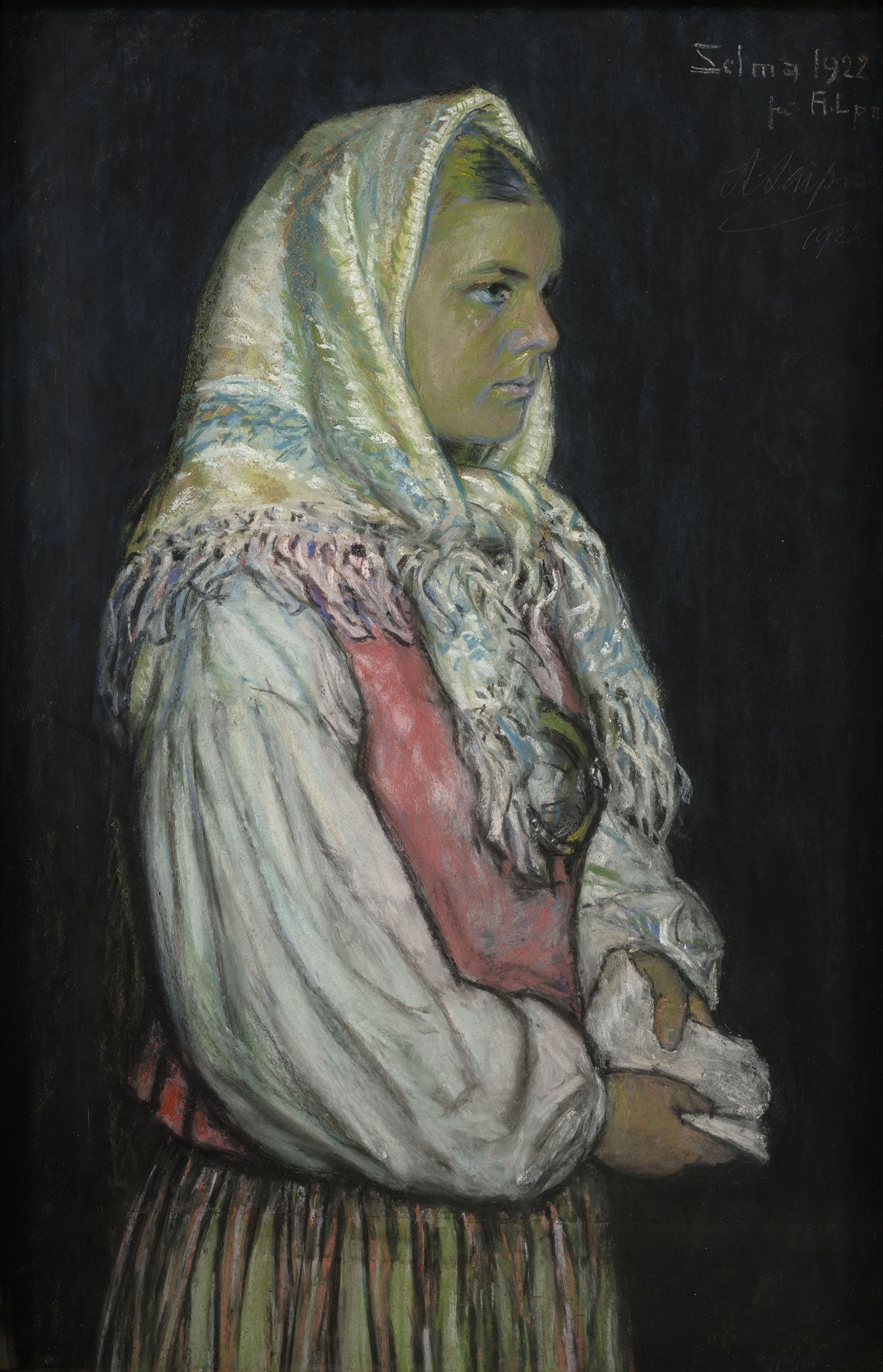
Selma (1922)

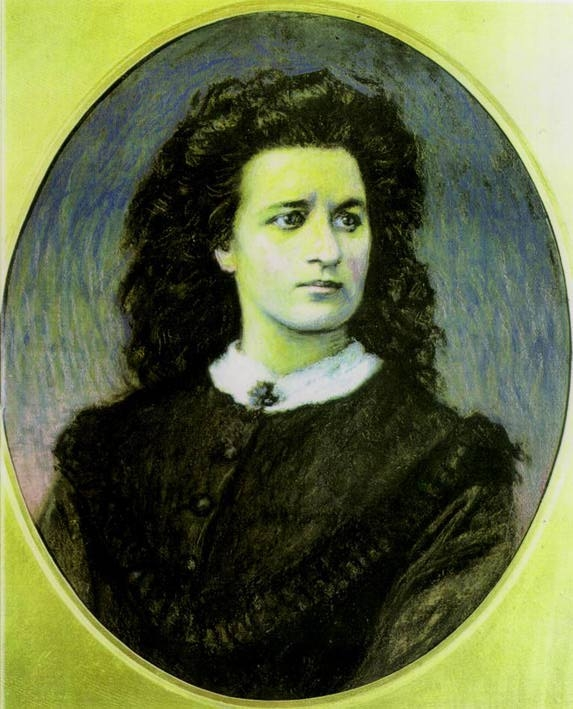
Portrait of Lydia Koidula (1924)

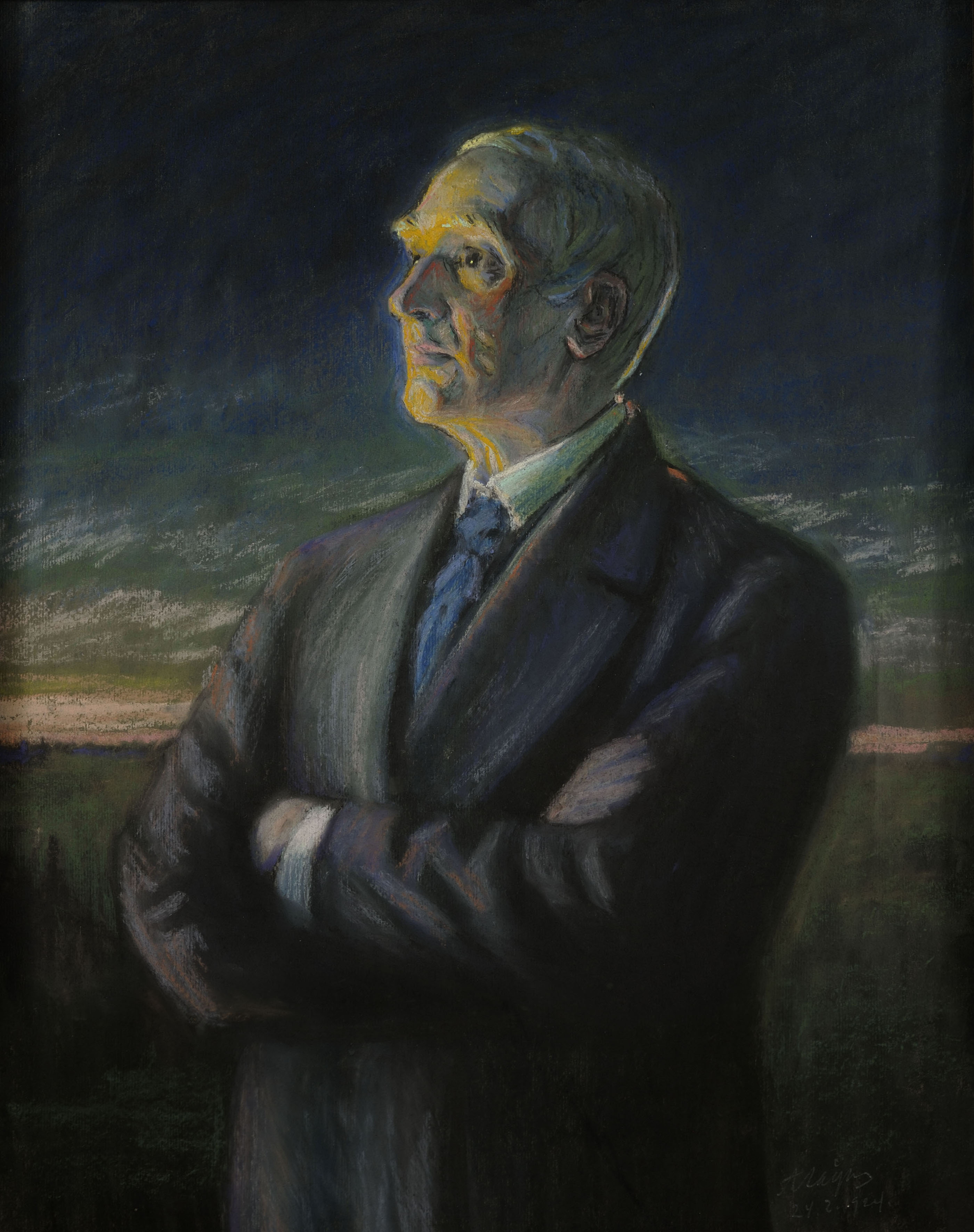
Portrait of Fr.R. Kreutzwald (1924)

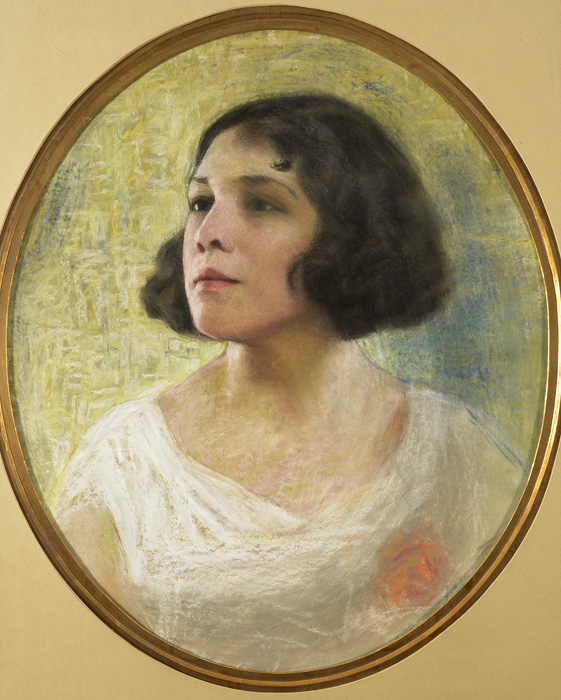
Portrait of Hilda Gleser (1932)

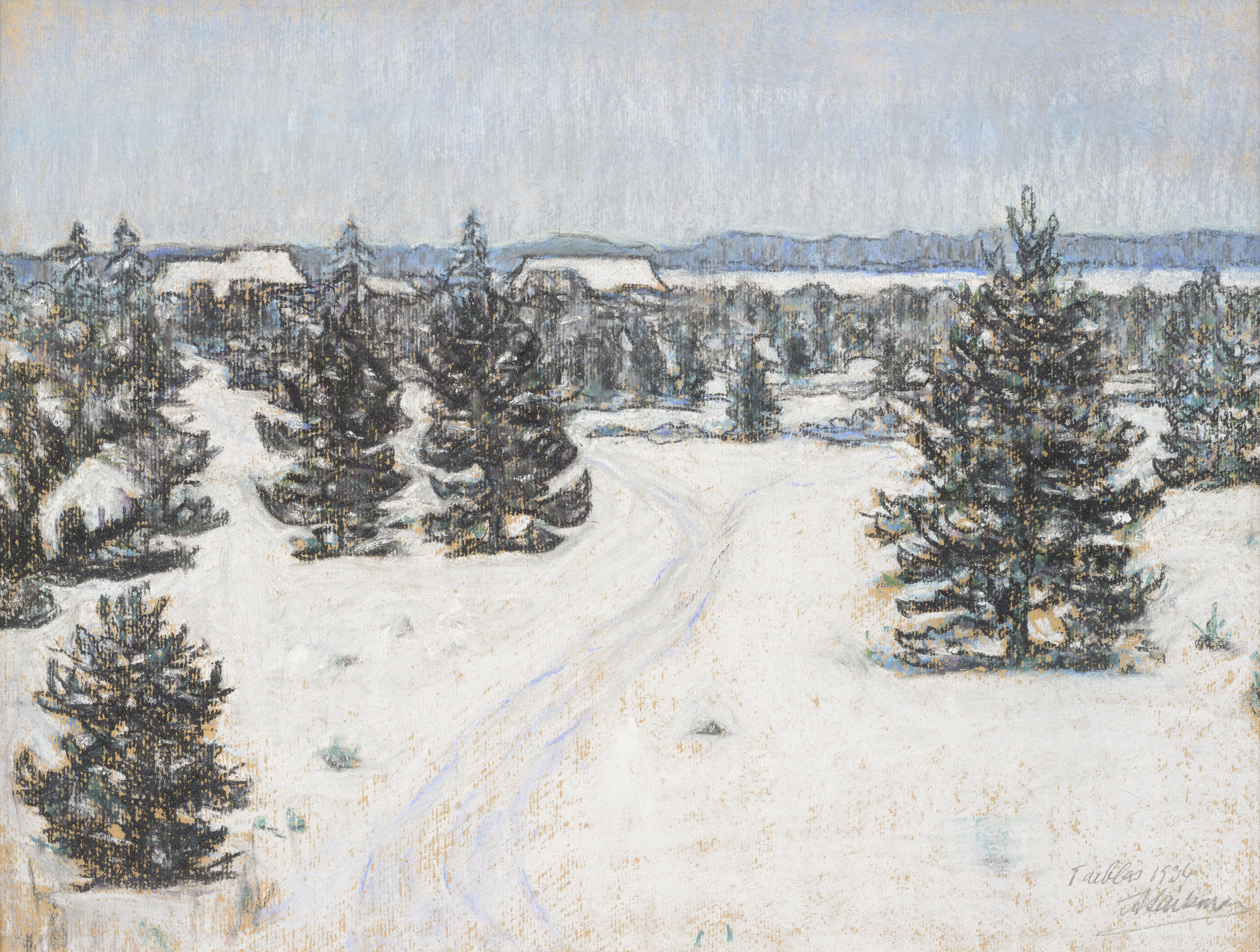
Taebla Landscape (1936)

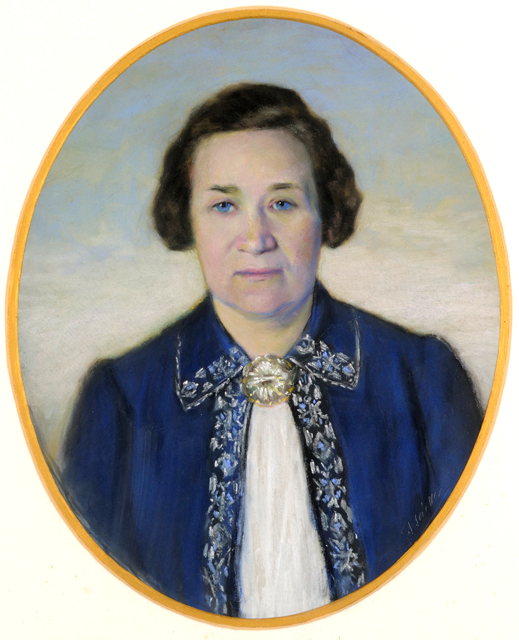
Portrait of Linda Eenpalu (1938)
