= Taebla =

Borough in Estonia

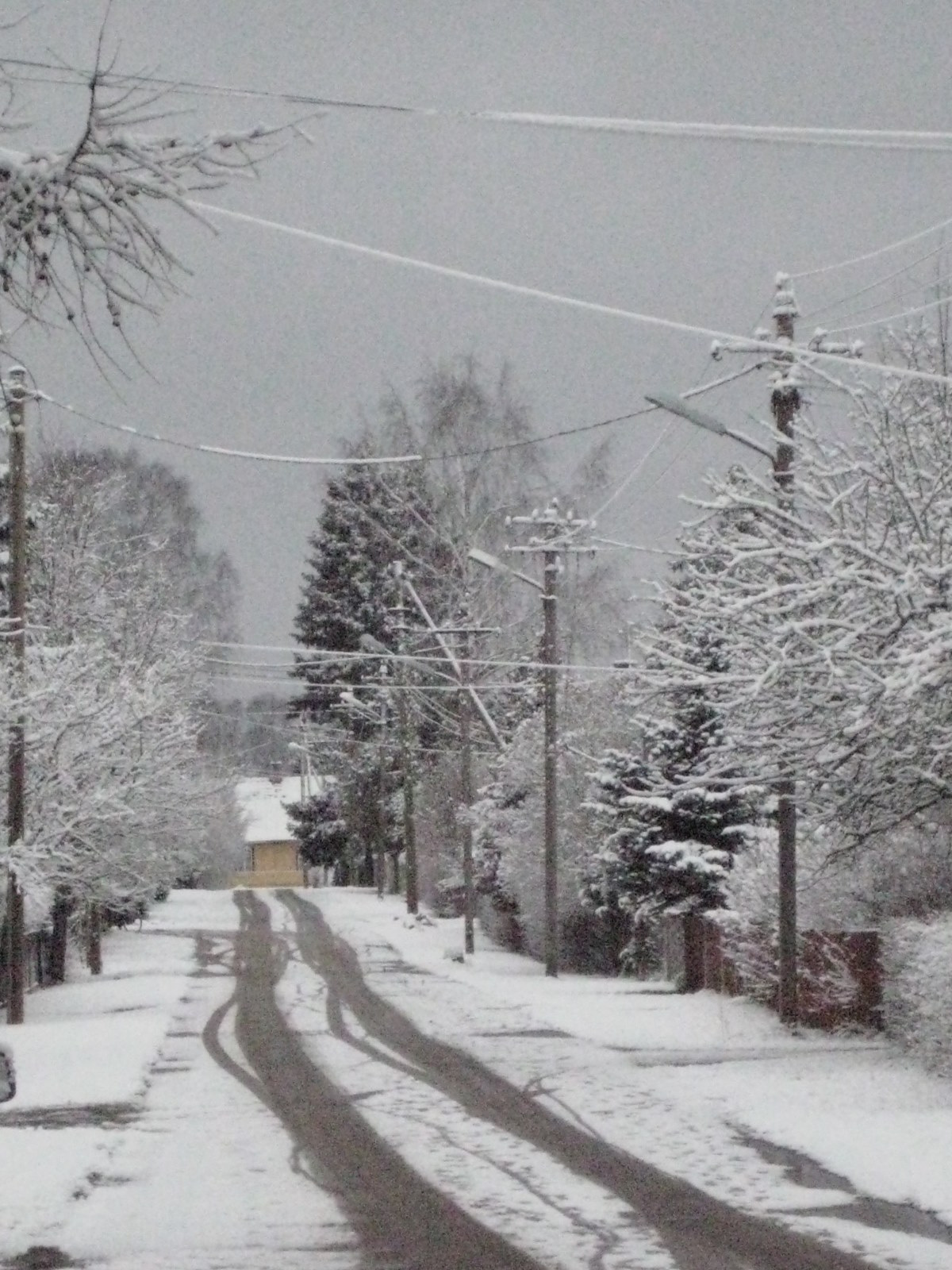
- Uus Street in Taebla

- Location within Estonia
- Coordinates: 58°57′2″N 23°43′31″E
- Country: Estonia
- County: Lääne County
- Parish: Lääne-Nigula Parish

Population (01.01.2010)
  - Total: 929

Taebla is a small borough (alevik) in Lääne County, Estonia, the administrative centre of Lääne-Nigula Parish. It has a population of 929 (as of 1 January 2010).

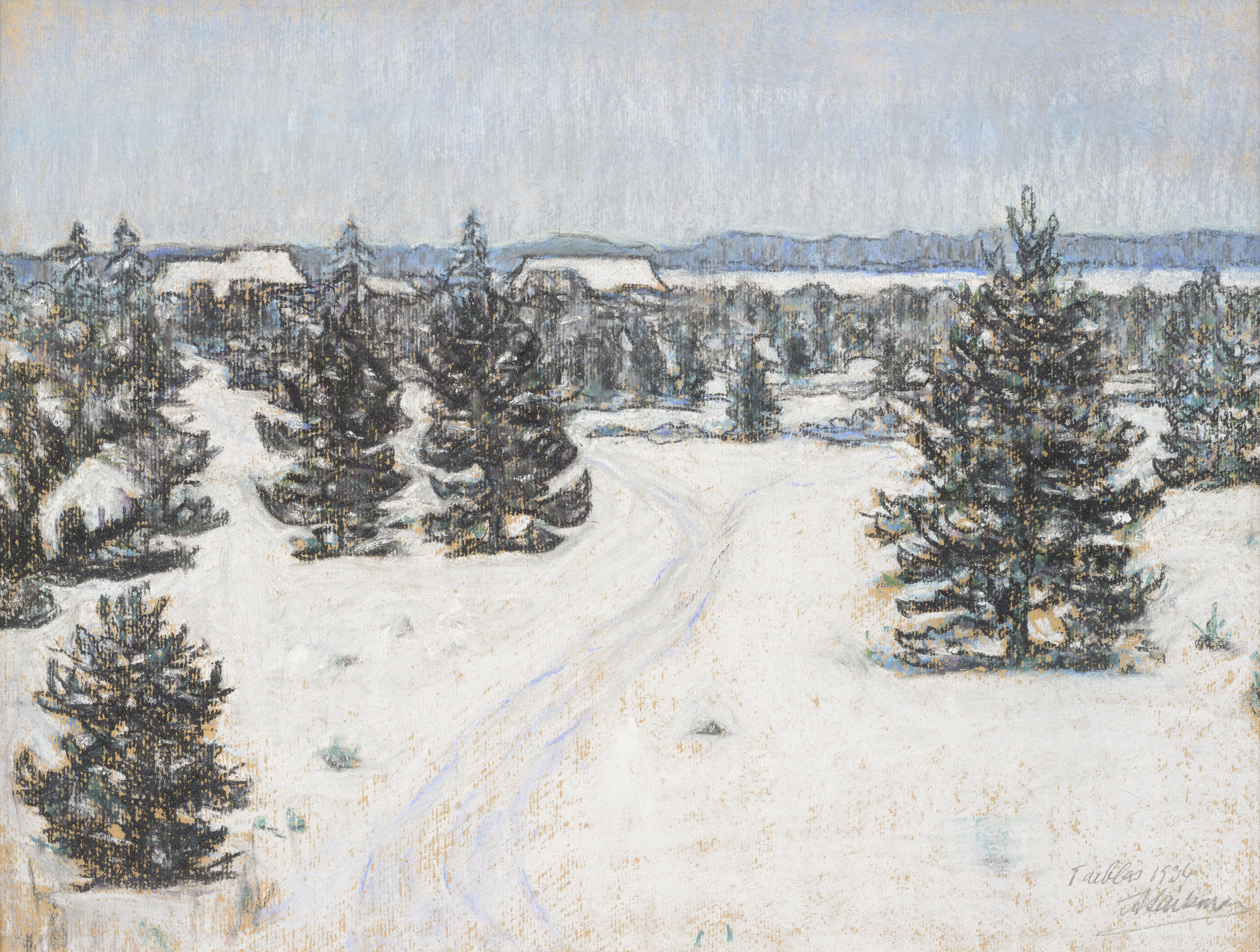
Ants Laikmaa, Taebla Landscape (1936)

== Notable people ==
Michael Roos (born 1982), American football player, was born in Taebla.
