= Hilda Gleser =

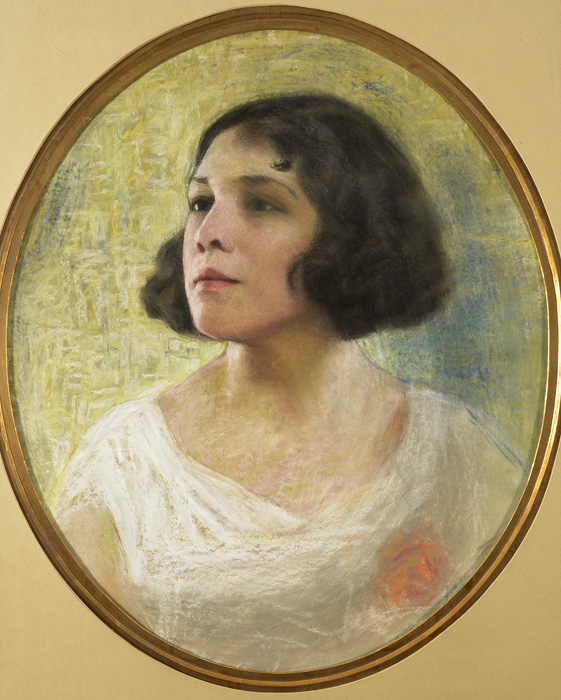
- Portrait of Hilda Gleser (A. Laikmaa, 1932)
- Born: 8 July 1893; Viljandi, Estonia
- Died: 25 August 1932 (aged 39); Tallinn, Estonia
- Burial place: Viljandi
- Citizenship: Russian Empire; Estonia
- Occupations: Actress, director, theatre teacher
- Years active: 1910–1932

Hilda Gleser (8 July 1893 – 25 August 1932) was an Estonian actress, director and theatre teacher.

== Biography ==
Hilda Gleser was born on 8 [O.S. 1893] July in the city of Viljandi in the family of a bricklayer, where she also received her primary and secondary education. From 1910 she took part in amateur performances. She did not receive a professional theater education, but took acting lessons from the Finnish actress Hilma Rantanen, and later improved her skills in Germany and Russia.

From 1916 until the end of her life, she was an actress at the Estonia theatre in Tallinn. From 1921 to 1924 she worked in parallel at the Morning Theatre, and from 1926 to 1932 at the Workers' Theatre. Among her best roles were: Puck (Shakespeare's A Midsummer Night's Dream, 1919), Woman (Ernst Toller's The Man-Mass, 1922), Electra (Hugo von Hofmannsthal's Electra, 1923), Åse (Henrik Ibsen's Peer Gynt, 1927), Mrs. Peachum (Bertolt Brecht's The Threepenny Opera, 1930), Laura (Eduard Vilde's Musta mantliga mees, 1927), Tiina (August Kitzberg's Libahunt, 1928). She performed in the genre of artistic recitation (from 1929 on the radio). As the Theater Encyclopedia notes, "the images created by Gleser are marked by vivid character, sincerity, heroic direction, and are distinguished by a sharp, distinctive design and extreme expressiveness".

In 1924–1932, she taught stage practice at the School of Theater Arts in Tallinn. In 1924, she debuted as a theater director with the play Earth by Bryusov at the Morning Theatre. Gleser opposed bourgeois tastes and preferred socially critical dramas. The influence of German expressionism was felt in her plays. She was good at rhythmic crowd scenes. Among Gleser's most notable productions are: R.U.R. by Karel Čapek (1925, Estonia Theatre), Night by Martinet (1927, Workers' Theatre), In the Whirl of Winds by August Kitzberg (1927, Workers' Theatre), The Lower Depths by Maxim Gorky (1931, Workers' Theatre), Hoppla, We're Alive! by Ernst Toller (1929, Workers' Theatre).

Hilda Gleser died 25 August 1932 of a serious illness in the Tallinn Surgical Hospital. Buried in the old cemetery of Viljandi.
