= Estonian Writers' Online Dictionary =

The Estonian Writers' Online Dictionary (abbreviated as EWOD, in Estonian 'Eesti kirjanike e-leksikon', abbreviated as EKEL) is an online reference work that compiles biographical and bibliographic information about Estonian writers in English and Estonian. The dictionary is compiled and published by the Department of Literature and Theatre Research at the Institute of Cultural Research at the University of Tartu; its editors-in-chief are the professors of literature Jüri Talvet and Arne Merilai, and the managing editor is Sven Vabar. The project was launched in 2014.

According to Arne Merilai, the goal of EWOD is “to accumulate essential foreign- and native-language information about Estonian literature and its reception in both Estonia and abroad”. The lexicon was primarily intended to fill the gap in the dissemination of systematic information about Estonian literature outside Estonia, which is why the project was launched in English. The next stage was publishing articles in Estonian, as the publication of comprehensive literary lexicons in Estonia has not continued since the Estonian Writers’ Dictionary (Eesti kirjanike leksikon) compiled by Oskar Kruus (2000), and the need for updated information persists.
