= Vängla =

Village in Estonia

Coordinates: 58°45′N 24°14′E

- Village
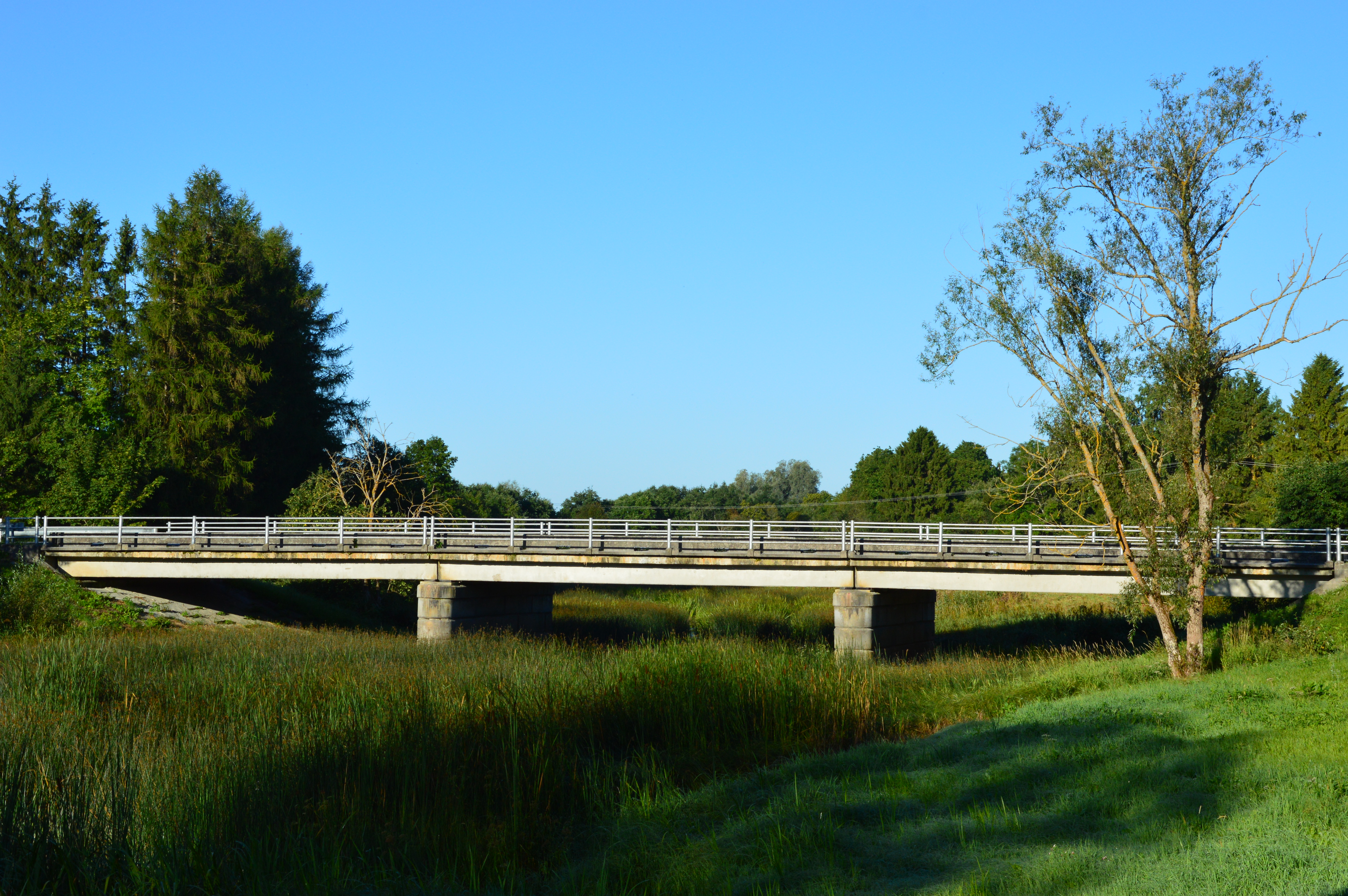
- Vängla bridge over Velise River
- Interactive map of Vängla
- Country: Estonia
- County: Rapla County
- Parish: Märjamaa Parish
- Time zone: UTC+2 (EET)
  - Summer (DST): UTC+3 (EEST)

Vängla is a village in Märjamaa Parish, Rapla County in western Estonia.
