= Kadapiku, Kadrina Parish =

Village in Estonia

Coordinates: 59°20′54″N 26°09′41″E

Kadapiku
- Village
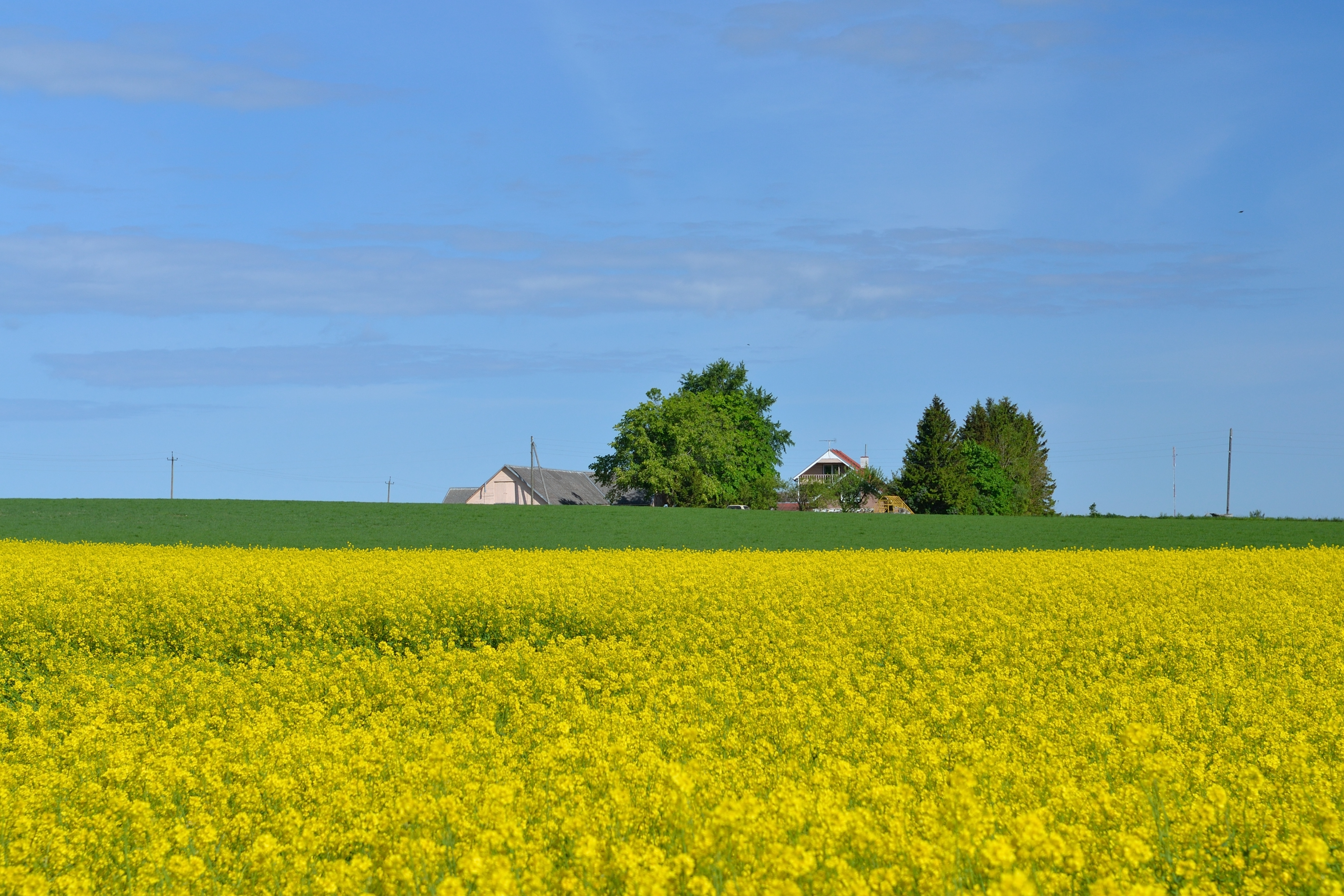
- Interactive map of Kadapiku
- Country: Estonia
- County: Lääne-Viru County
- Parish: Kadrina Parish
- Time zone: UTC+2 (EET)
  - Summer (DST): UTC+3 (EEST)

Kadapiku is a village in Kadrina Parish, Lääne-Viru County, in northeastern Estonia. It lies on the right bank of the Loobu River, just north of Kadrina, the administrative centre of the municipality.
