= Ojapere =

Village in Estonia

Coordinates: 58°43′N 24°15′E

- Village
- Interactive map of Ojapere
- Country: Estonia
- County: Rapla County
- Parish: Märjamaa Parish
- Time zone: UTC+2 (EET)
  - Summer (DST): UTC+3 (EEST)

Ojapere is a village in Märjamaa Parish, Rapla County in western Estonia.
