= Sääla =

Village in Estonia

Coordinates: 58°44′N 24°21′E

- Village
- Interactive map of Sääla
- Country: Estonia
- County: Rapla County
- Parish: Märjamaa Parish
- Time zone: UTC+2 (EET)
  - Summer (DST): UTC+3 (EEST)

Sääla is a village in Märjamaa Parish, Rapla County in western Estonia.

== Name ==
Sääla was attested in written sources as Seel in 1420, Szeell in 1536, Sela in 1726 (referring to the village), and Sela/Saehla in 1798 (referring to a manor outpost and the village, respectively). In addition, the 1531 name Szallenkus (later appearing as Sollenkos) has also been connected with this village. It is believed that the name is derived from the Estonian word salu 'grove, copse'.

== Notable people ==
- Mihkel Aitsam (1877–1953), writer, journalist, and historian
