= Kadarpiku =

Village in Estonia

Coordinates: 58°57′19″N 23°42′56″E

- Village
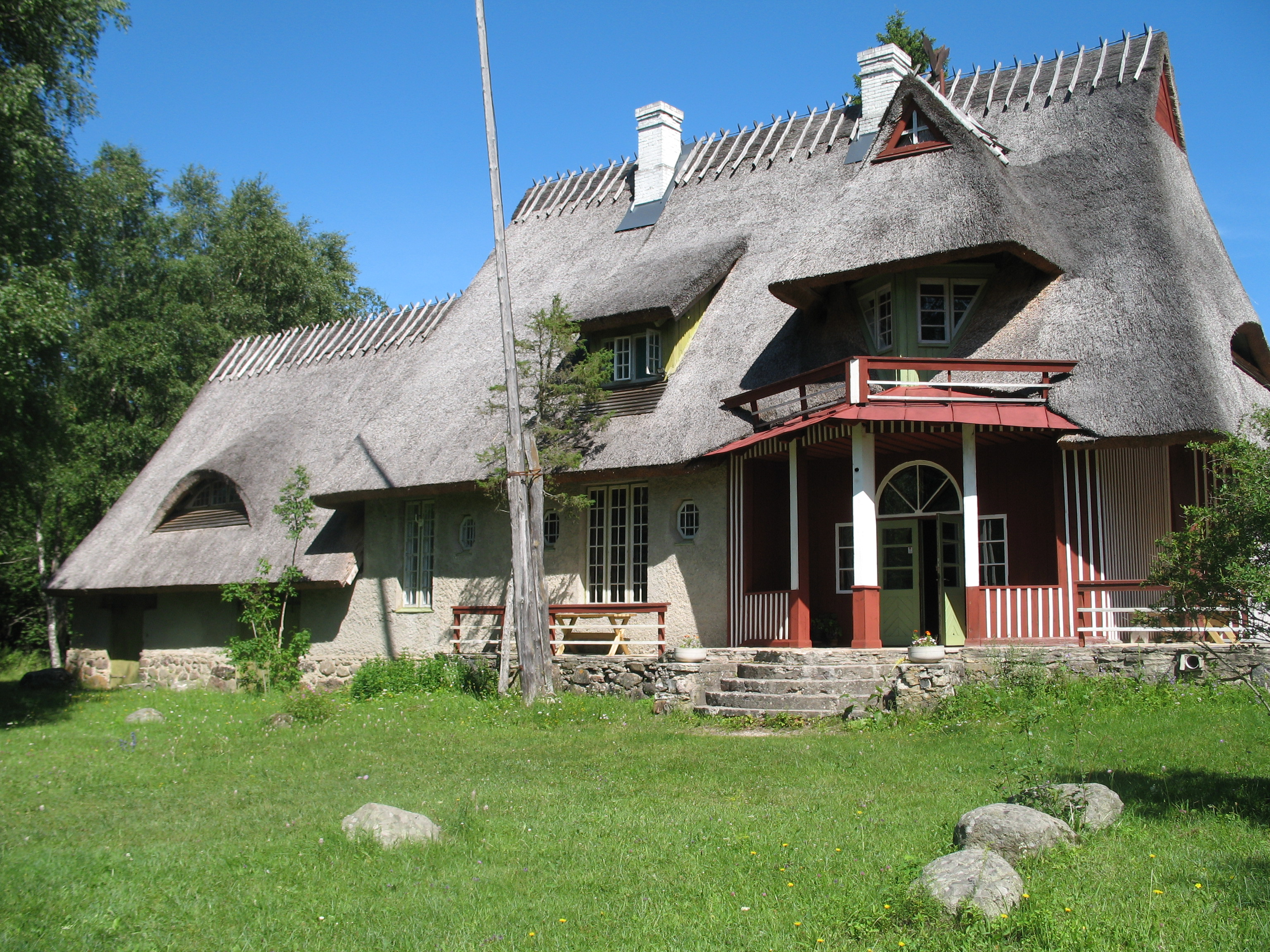
- Interactive map of Kadarpiku
- Country: Estonia
- County: Lääne
- Parish: Lääne-Nigula
- Time zone: UTC+2 (EET)
  - Summer (DST): UTC+3 (EEST)

Kadarpiku is a village in Lääne-Nigula Parish, Lääne County, in western Estonia.

Painter Ants Laikmaa (1866–1942) lived in Kadarpiku village from 1932 to his death in 1942. The house is currently used as a museum dedicated to Laikmaa (Ants Laikmaa Museum).
