= Oese (Hönne) =

River in Germany

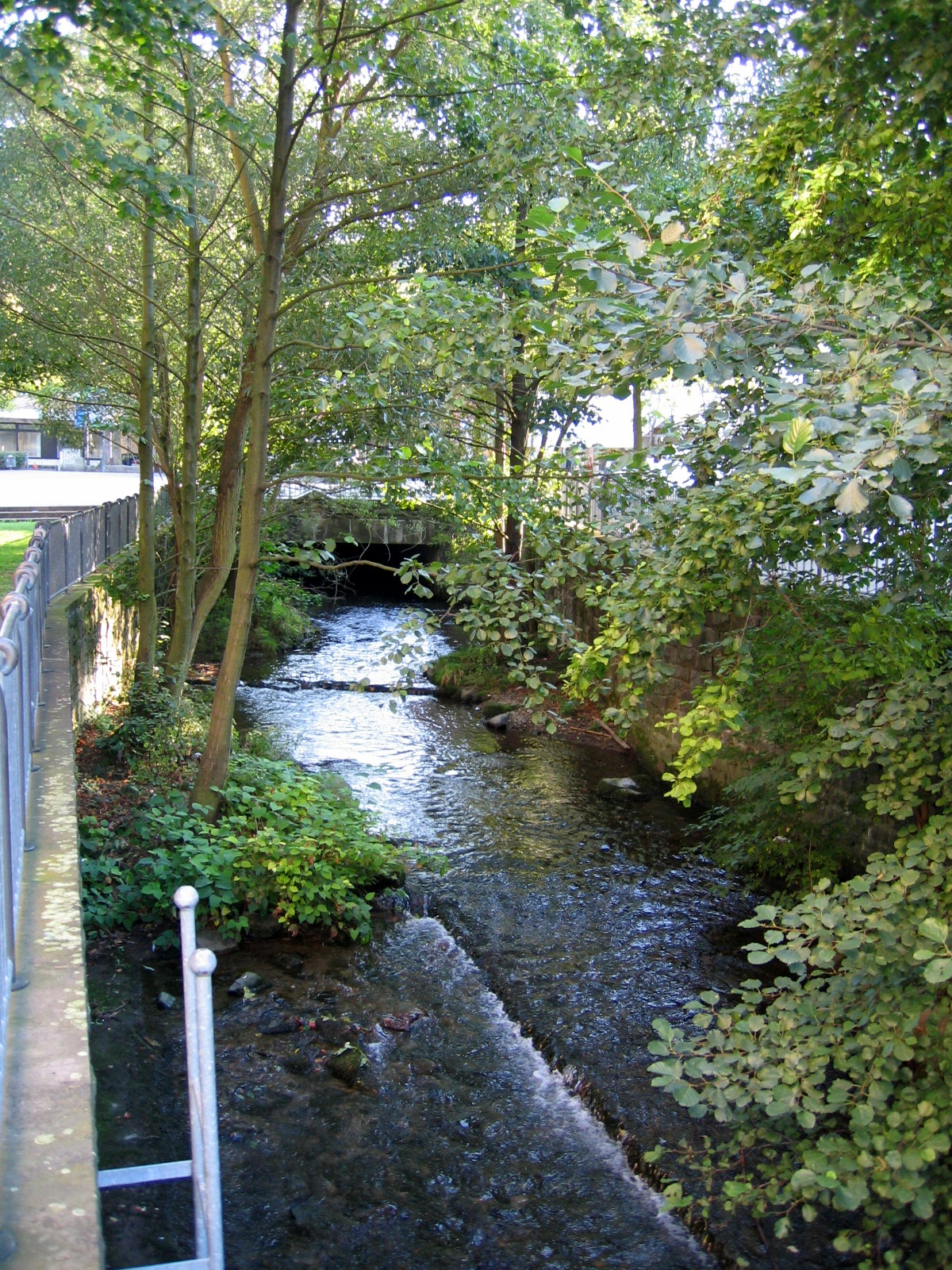

Location
- Country: Germany
- State: North Rhine-Westphalia

Physical characteristics
- Mouth
  - location: Hönne
  - coordinates: 51.4294°N 7.8078°E
- Length: 19.5 km (12.1 mi)

Basin features
- Progression: Hönne→ Ruhr→ Rhine→ North Sea

Oese (in its upper course: Gelmecke and Sundwiger Bach) is a river of North Rhine-Westphalia, Germany. It is a left tributary of the Hönne, which it joins in Menden.

== See also ==
- List of rivers of North Rhine-Westphalia
