= Araste =

Village in Estonia

Coordinates: 58°44′N 24°21′E

- Village
- Interactive map of Araste
- Country: Estonia
- County: Rapla County
- Parish: Märjamaa Parish
- Time zone: UTC+2 (EET)
  - Summer (DST): UTC+3 (EEST)

Araste is a village in Märjamaa Parish, Rapla County in western Estonia.

Painter Ants Laikmaa (Hans Laipman) (1866–1942) and freedom activist Bernhard Laipman (1865–1906) were born in Araste.
