= Pallika, Rapla County =

Village in Estonia

Pallika
- Village
- Interactive map of Pallika
- Coordinates: 58°41′54″N 24°23′02″E
- Country: Estonia
- County: Rapla County
- Parish: Märjamaa Parish
- Time zone: UTC+2 (EET)
  - Summer (DST): UTC+3 (EEST)

Pallika is a village in Märjamaa Parish, Rapla County in western Estonia.
