= Palase, Estonia =

Village in Estonia

Coordinates: 58°44′39″N 24°26′28″E

Palase
- Village
- Interactive map of Palase
- Country: Estonia
- County: Rapla County
- Parish: Märjamaa Parish
- Time zone: UTC+2 (EET)
  - Summer (DST): UTC+3 (EEST)

Palase is a village in Märjamaa Parish, Rapla County in western Estonia.
