= Oese, Rapla County =

Village in Estonia

Coordinates: 58°45′20″N 24°15′31″E

Oese
- Village
- Interactive map of Oese
- Country: Estonia
- County: Rapla County
- Parish: Märjamaa Parish
- Time zone: UTC+2 (EET)
  - Summer (DST): UTC+3 (EEST)

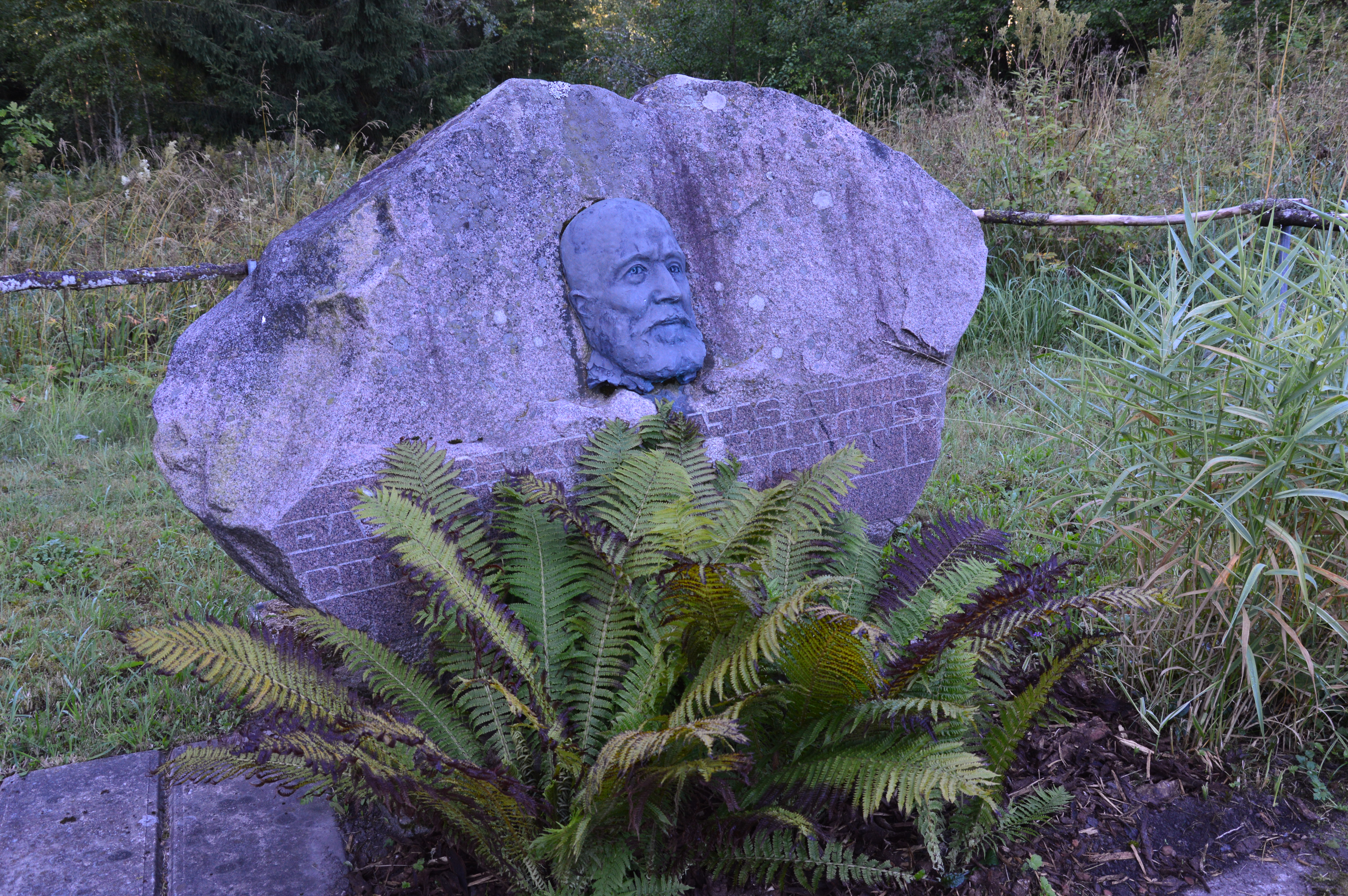
Matthias Johann Eisen memorial stone in Oese, Rapla County, Estonia

Oese is a village in Märjamaa Parish, Rapla County in western Estonia.
