= Nõva Parish =

Former municipality of Estonia

Coordinates: 59°12′59″N 23°40′20″E

Nõva Parish Nõva vald
- Former municipality of Estonia
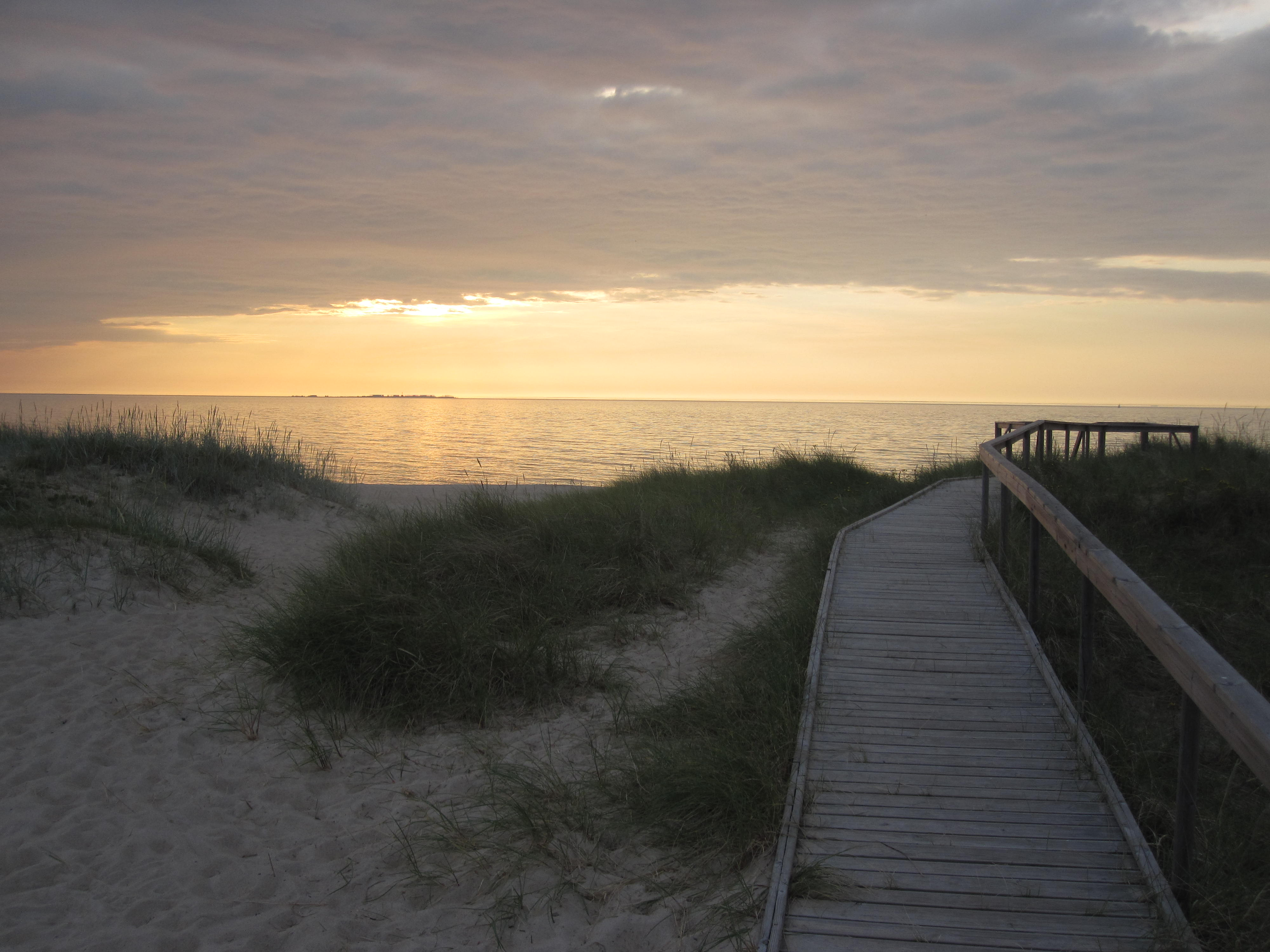
- View of the sea from Peraküla

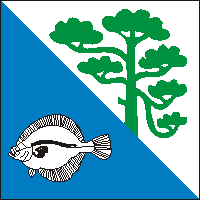
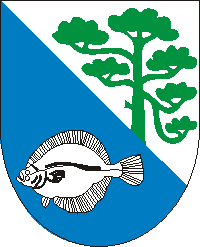
- Flag Coat of arms

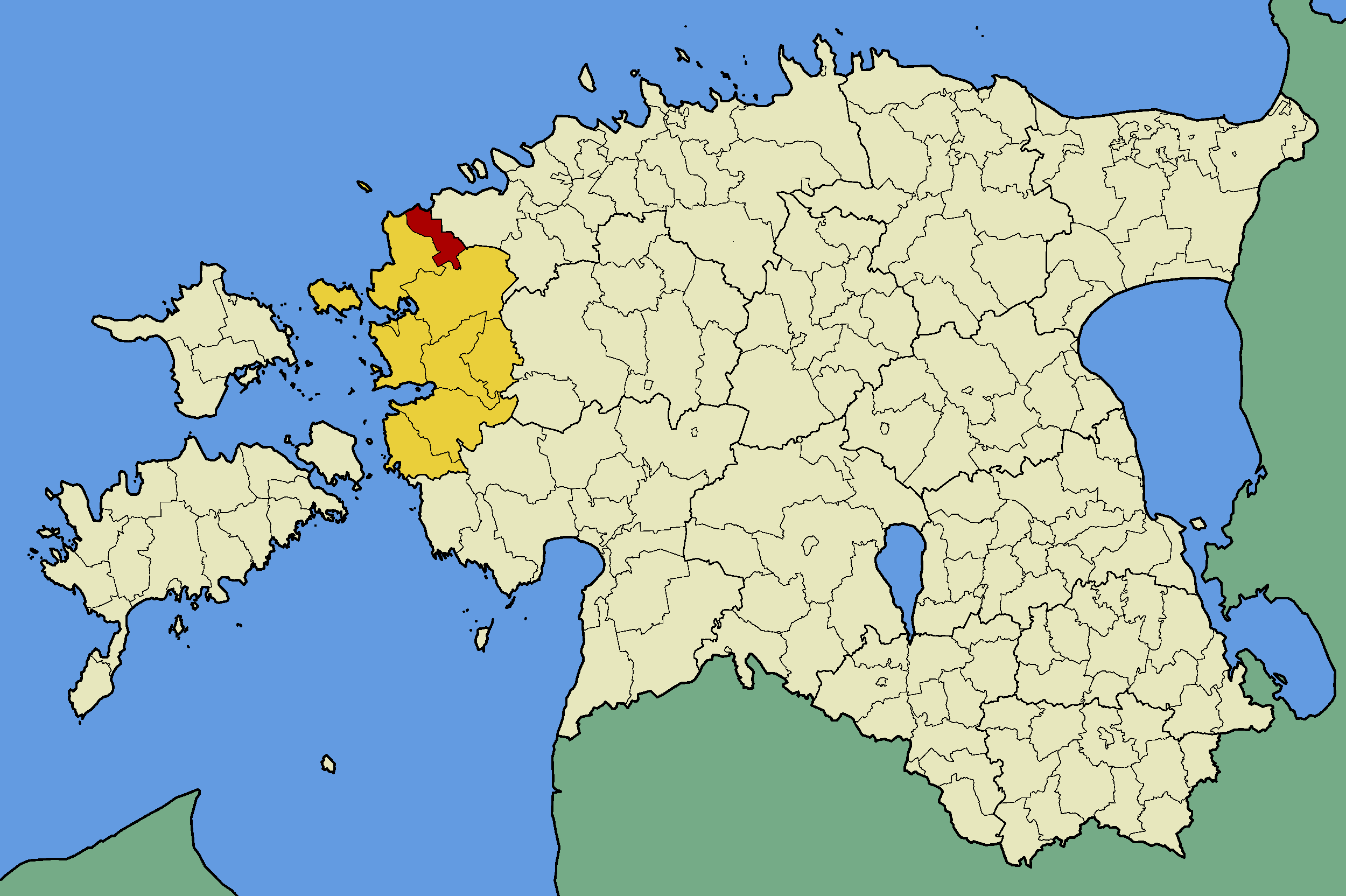
- Nõva Parish within Lääne County.
- Country: Estonia
- County: Lääne County
- Administrative centre: Nõva

Area
  - Total: 129.6 km^{2} (50.0 sq mi)

Population (2008)
  - Total: 465
  - Density: 3.59/km^{2} (9.29/sq mi)
- Website: www.novavald.ee

Nõva (Estonian: Nõva vald) was a rural municipality of Estonia, in Lääne County. It had a population of 465 (2008) and an area of 129.6 km². During the administrative reform of Estonian local governments in 2017, a new local government unit - called Lääne-Nigula parish - was formed through the merger of Nõva and other four rural municipalities.

The center of Nõva parish was the village of Nõva, which is located 48 km from Haapsalu and 81 km from Tallinn.

== Populated places ==
Nõva Parish had 8 villages: Hindaste, Nõmmemaa, Nõva, Peraküla, Rannaküla, Tusari, Vaisi, Variku.
