= Rannaküla =

Rannaküla may refer to several places in Estonia:

- Rannaküla, Hiiu County, village in Hiiumaa Parish, Hiiu County
- Rannaküla, Lääne-Nigula Parish, village in Lääne-Nigula Parish, Lääne County
- Rannaküla, Lääneranna Parish, village in Lääneranna Parish, Pärnu County
- Rannaküla, Muhu Parish, village in Muhu Parish, Saare County
- Rannaküla, Saaremaa Parish, village in Saaremaa Parish, Saare County
- Rannaküla, Tartu County, village in Elva Parish, Tartu County
- Rannaküla, Laimjala Parish, former village in Laimjala Parish, Saare County
