= Baltic Finnic peoples =

Group of peoples around the Baltic Sea

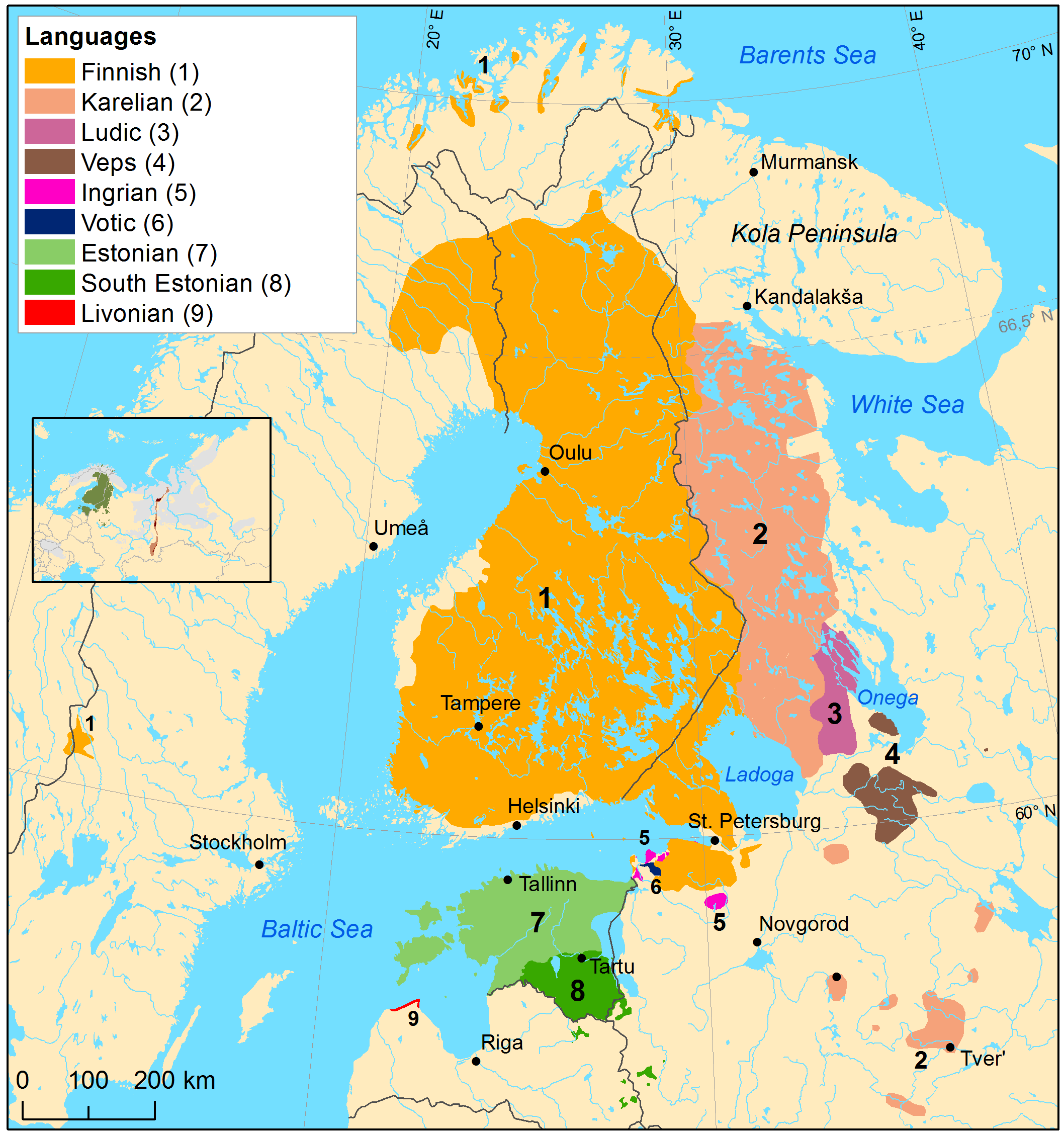
- Finnic languages at the beginning of the 20th century

Total population
- c. 7.4–8.2 million

Regions with significant populations
- Finns: c. 6.2–7 million
- Estonians: c. 1.1 million
- Tornedalians: c. 150,000
- Karelians: c. 43,000
- Kvens: c. 15,000
- Vepsians: c. 4,800
- Izhorians: c. 1,000
- Livonians: c. 430-610
- Votes: c. 100

Languages
- Finnic languages

Religion
- Predominantly Christianity (either Lutheranism or Eastern Orthodoxy); minority Uralic Neopaganism, Roman Catholicism and Evangelicalism

Related ethnic groups
- Other Finno-Ugric peoples

The Baltic Finnic peoples, often simply referred to as the Finnic peoples, (Note: Other names include Balto-Finnic peoples, Baltic Sea Finns, Baltic Finns and Western Finnic peoples.) are the peoples inhabiting the Baltic Sea region in Northern and Eastern Europe who speak Finnic languages. They include the Finns, Estonians (including Võros and Setos), Karelians (including Ludes and Livvi), Veps, Izhorians, Votes, and Livonians. In some cases the Kvens, Ingrians, Tornedalians and speakers of Meänkieli are considered separate from the Finns.

The bulk of the Finnic peoples (more than 98%) are ethnic Finns and Estonians, who reside in the two independent Finnic nation states—Finland and Estonia.

Finnic peoples are also significant minority groups in neighbouring countries of Sweden, Norway and Russia, especially Karelia.

== Theories of origin ==
According to the "Migration Theory" that was based primarily on comparative linguistics, the proto-Finns migrated from an ancient homeland somewhere in north-western Siberia or western Russia to the shores of the Baltic Sea around 1000 BC, at which time Finns and Estonians separated. The Migration Theory has been called into question since 1980 based on genealogy, craniometry and archaeology. Recently, a modified form of the Migration Theory has gained new support among the younger generation of linguists, who consider that archaeology, genes and craniometric data cannot supply evidence of prehistoric languages.

During the last 30 years, scientific research in physical anthropology, craniometric analyses, and mitochondrial and Y-chromosomal DNA frequencies have reduced the likelihood of the Migration Theory—a major westward migration as recently as 3,000 years ago. The Settlement Continuity Theory asserts that at least the genetic ancestors of the Finno-Ugric peoples were among the earliest indigenous peoples of Europe.

The origin of the people who lived around the Baltic Sea area during the Mesolithic Era continues to be debated by scientists. From the middle of the Neolithic onward, there is a certain extent of agreement among scholars: it has been suggested that Finno-Ugric tribes arrived in the Baltic region from the east or south-east around the period 4000–3000 BC and merged with the original inhabitants, who then adopted the proto-Finno-Ugric language and the Pit–Comb Ware culture of the newcomers. The members of this new Finno-Ugric-speaking ethnicity are thought to be the ancestors of modern-day Estonians. The Y-chromosomal data has also revealed a common Finno-Ugric ancestry for the males of the neighbouring Balts, speakers of the Indo-European Baltic languages. According to the studies, Baltic males are most closely related to the Volga Finns such as the Mari, rather than to Baltic Finns. The results suggest that the territories of Estonia, Latvia and Lithuania have been settled by Finno-Ugric tribes since the early Mesolithic period.

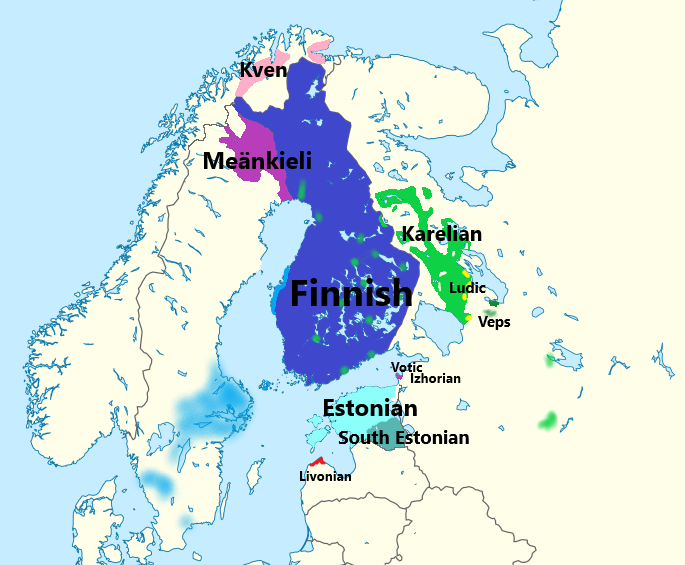
Finnic Languages in the 21st century

On the other hand, some linguists do not consider it likely that a Baltic Finnic language form could have existed at such an early date. According to these views, the Finno-Ugric languages appeared in Finland and the Baltic region only during the Early Bronze Age (ca. 1800 BC), if not later.

While Finns have mostly European genes, they also have some additional East Eurasian ancestry (varies from 5 up to 10–13%). This component is most likely Siberian-related, best represented by the north Siberian Nganasans. The specific Siberian-like ancestry is suggested to have arrived in Northern Europe during the early Iron Age, linked to the arrival of Uralic languages.

== Finnic oral poetry ==
The Finnic peoples share a common cultural heritage: the art of ancient "rune" (poem) singing in the Kalevala meter, estimated to be 2,500–3,000 years old. The Finnish and Estonian national epics, Kalevala and Kalevipoeg, are both written in this meter. The Veps are the only Baltic Finnish people with no significant corpus of Kalevala meter oral poetry. The poetic tradition has included epic poems (known mostly in Karelia and Ingria, perhaps as survivals from an earlier, wider distribution), lyric poems and magic chants.

The ancient rune singing has inspired the creation of the national epic of Finland, Kalevala compiled by Elias Lönnrot, and the national epic Kalevipoeg of Estonia, written by Friedrich Reinhold Kreutzwald. It has also inspired the music of Arvo Pärt, the best-known Estonian composer in the classical field.

J. R. R. Tolkien has highlighted the importance of Kalevala as a source for his legendarium, including The Silmarillion and The Lord of the Rings.

== History of the Finnic peoples ==
=== The Mesolithic Period ===
The region has been populated since the end of the last glacial era, about 10,000 BC. The earliest traces of human settlement are connected with Suomusjärvi culture and Kunda culture. The Early Mesolithic Pulli settlement is located by the Pärnu River. It has been dated to the beginning of the 9th millennium BC. The Kunda Culture received its name from the Lammasmäe settlement site in northern Estonia, which dates from earlier than 8500. Bone and stone artefacts similar to those found at Kunda have been discovered elsewhere in Estonia, as well as in Latvia, northern Lithuania and southern Finland.

=== The Neolithic Period ===
Around 5300 BCE pottery and agriculture entered Finland. The earliest representatives belong to the Pit–Comb Ware culture, known for their distinctive decorating patterns. This marks the beginning of the Neolithic.

==== Pit–Comb Ware culture ====
Neolithic period

Until the early 1980s, the arrival of Finnic peoples, the ancestors of the Estonians, Finns, and Livonians on the shores of the Baltic Sea around 3000 BC, was associated with the Pit–Comb Ware culture. However, such a linking of archaeologically defined cultural entities with linguistic ones cannot be proven and it has been suggested that the increase of settlement finds in the period is more likely to have been associated with an economic boom related to the warming of climate. Some researchers have even argued that a form of Uralic languages may have been spoken in Estonia and Finland since the end of the last glaciation. Through archaeogenetics the population has been shown to derive the bulk of its ancestry from Eastern Hunter-Gatherers of Russia.

=== Bronze Age ===
The beginning of the Bronze Age in Estonia is dated to approximately 1800 BC, in present-day Finland some time after 1500 BCE. The coastal regions of Finland were a part of the Nordic Bronze Culture, whereas in the inland regions the influences came from the bronze-using cultures of Northern Russia. The first fortified settlements, Asva and Ridala on the island of Saaremaa and Iru in Northern Estonia, began to be built. The development of shipbuilding facilitated the spread of bronze. Changes took place in burial customs, a new type of burial ground spread from Germanic to Estonian areas, stone cist graves and cremation burials became increasingly common beside small numbers of boat-shaped stone graves. In terms of genetics, the Bronze Age population of the East Baltic derives most of their ancestry from the Corded Ware culture with an elevated amount of Mesolithic Hunter-Gatherer ancestry, but showing no prevalence of Siberian related ancestry.

=== The Iron Age ===
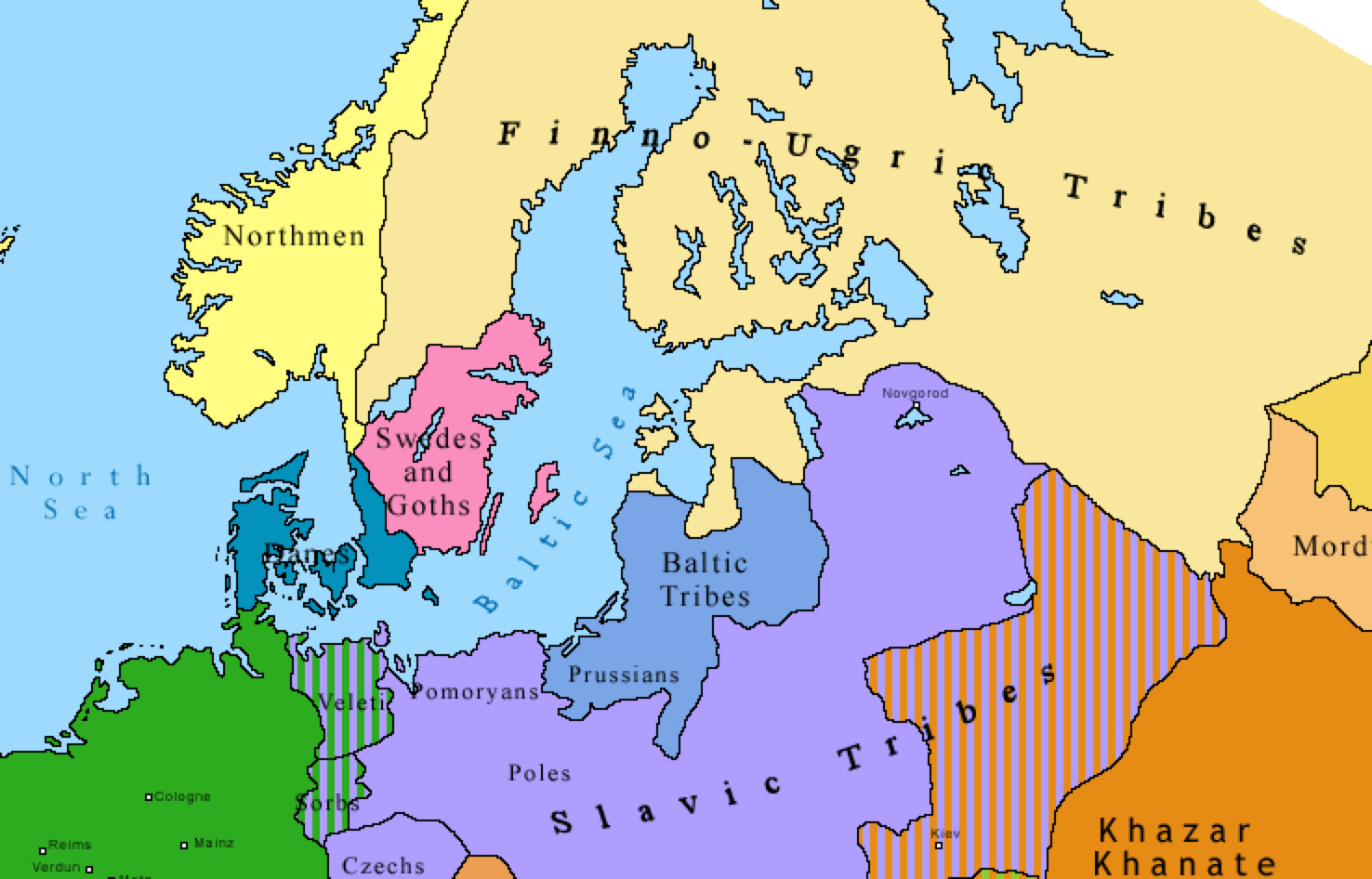
Northern Europe in 814.

The Pre-Roman Iron Age began in about 500 BC and lasted until the middle of the 1st century. The oldest iron items were imported, although since the 1st century iron was smelted from local marsh and lake ore. Settlement sites were located mostly in places that offered natural protection. Fortresses were built, although used temporarily. The appearance of square Celtic fields surrounded by enclosures in Estonia date from the Pre-Roman Iron Age. The majority of stones with man-made indents, which presumably were connected with magic designed to increase crop fertility, date from this period. A new type of grave, quadrangular burial mounds, began to develop. Burial traditions show the clear beginning of social stratification. The first reported individuals with the y-DNA haplotype N-M231 in the Baltic are from the Iron Age, alongside Siberian ancestry.

The Roman Iron Age is roughly dated to between AD 50 and 450, the era that was affected by the influence of the Roman Empire. In material culture this is reflected by a few Roman coins, some jewellery and artefacts. The abundance of iron artefacts in Southern Estonia speaks of closer mainland ties with southern areas, while coastal Finland and the islands of western and northern Estonia communicated with their neighbours mainly by sea.

Between 200 and 400 AD, a group of Baltic Sea Finns in southwestern Finland (Finland proper), who had traveled there from the areas of nowadays Estonia, began moving inland towards Tavastia.

Between 200 and 400 AD, the Finns proper themselves became divided geographically in three parts:

1. Tavastians: The tribes who went inland to Tavastia;
2. Southwestern Finns: The tribes who stayed in the southern side of the Kokemäenjoki river delta;
3. Southern Ostrobothnians: The tribes who stayed on the northern side of the river delta.

During the Migration Period in 400–600 AD, the Estonian influence gradually weakened. By the end of the period, clearly defined tribal dialectical areas – Finns proper, Tavastians, Karelians, Northern Estonians, Southern Estonians, and Western Estonians including the islanders—had emerged, the population of each having formed its own understanding of identity.

=== Early Middle Ages ===
==== Finnic peoples in chronicles ====
The word Finn is first mentioned in the form Fenni in the 1st century AD by Roman historian Tacitus. However, it is possible that he was referring to the people of northern Europe in general, particularly the Lappic or Sami people. After that the name Finni is used by Claudius Ptolemaeus (around 150) and the Eastern Roman writer Jordanes in his Getica (551). References to Finnic tribes become much more numerous from the Viking Age (800–1050). It was not until about 1171 that the word Finni was employed to mean the Finns.

The term Aestii, the name of the Estonians, occurs first again in Tacitus; however, it might have indicated Balts. In Northern sagas (13th century), the term started to be used to indicate the Estonians.

In a Norwegian text (11th–12th century), the name Kiriali, referring to Karelians, and the term cornuti Finni, interpreted as referring to the Lapps or Sami people, first appear.

The opening chapter of the Old East Slavic Primary Chronicle (early 12th century) lists the following peoples living "in the share of Japheth" among others: Chud, Merya, Muroma, Ves, Cheremis, Mordvin, Chud Zavolochskaya ('beyond the portages'), Perm, Pechera, Sum (Suomi, possibly referring to Finns proper), Yam (Häme, referring to Tavastians), Yugra and Liv.

The Chudes, as mentioned in the earliest East Slavic chronicles, are in a 12th-century context usually considered to be Estonians, although the name sometimes referred to all Finnic peoples in north-western Rus. According to the Primary Chronicle, the Chudes' lands were bounded by the Varangian Sea (Baltic Sea). In 1030 Yaroslav I the Wise invaded the country of the Chudes and laid the foundations of Yuriev (the historical Russian name of Tartu, Estonia). They remained until 1061 when, according to chronicles, Yuryev was burned down by the Chudes. According to Old East Slavic chronicles, the Chudes were one of the founders of the Rus' state.

The northern (or eastern) Chudes were also a mythical people in folklore among Northern Russians and their neighbours. In Komi mythology, the Northern Chudes represent the mythic ancestors of the Komi people.

=== Middle Ages and Modern period ===
In the 13th century the east Baltic world was transformed by military conquest: first the Livs and Estonians, then the Finns underwent defeat, baptism, military occupation and sometimes extermination by groups of Germans, Danes and Swedes. Finland was governed as a part of Sweden, while Estonia was under a Baltic German knightly brotherhood before becoming parts of Russian Empire. Finland and Estonia became independent in 1917–1918 (see history of Finland and history of Estonia). The Karelians remained under Russian and then Soviet rule, and their absolute and relative numbers dwindled. When urbanization was peaking, less-numerous peoples rapidly lost capacity to maintain their village-based cultures and so were often assimilated to the mainstream society.

== See also ==
- Haplogroup N-M231
- Volga Finns
- Ushkovayzet
