= Randvere =

Randvere may refer to several places in Estonia:

- Randvere, Harju County, a village in Viimsi Parish, Harju County
- Randvere, Lääne-Saare Parish, a village in Lääne-Saare Parish, Saare County
- Randvere, Laimjala Parish, a village in Laimjala Parish, Saare County
- Randvere, Saaremaa Parish, a village in Saaremaa Parish, Saare County
