= Balto-Finnic =

Balto-Finnic or Baltic Finnic may refer to:

- Baltic Finnic peoples
- Finnic languages
