= Veskijärv =

Lake in Lääne County, Estonia

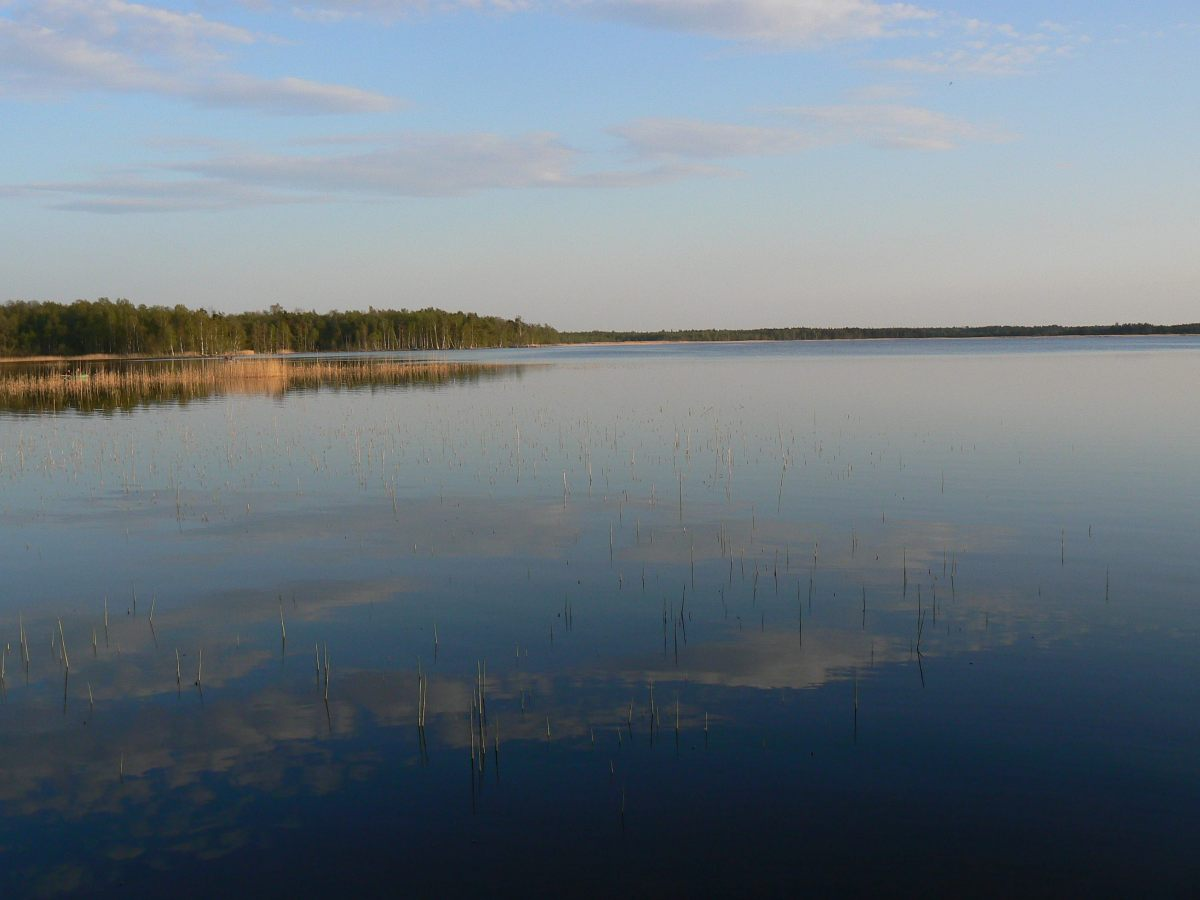

- Location within Estonia
- Location: Lääne-Nigula Parish, Lääne County, Estonia
- Coordinates: 59.1708°N 23.76°E
- Basin countries: Estonia
- Max. length: 2,120 meters (6,960 ft)
- Surface area: 185.2 hectares (458 acres)
- Average depth: 1.6 meters (5 ft 3 in)
- Max. depth: 2.7 meters (8 ft 10 in)
- Water volume: 2,924,000 cubic meters (103,300,000 cu ft)
- Shore length^{1}: 7,820 meters (25,660 ft)
- Surface elevation: 16.4 meters (54 ft)
- Islands: 1
- ^{1} Shore length is not a well-defined measure.

Veskijärv (also known as Nõva Veskijärv, Tamra järv, or Tamre järv) is a lake in Estonia. It is located in the village of Nõmmemaa in Lääne-Nigula Parish, Lääne County. The lake is a part of Läänemaa Suursoo Landscape Conservation Area.

== Physical description ==
The lake has an area of 185.2 hectares (458 acres), and it has an island with an area of 0.01 hectares (0.025 acres). The lake has an average depth of 1.6 meters (5 ft 3 in) and a maximum depth of 2.7 meters (8 ft 10 in). It is 2,120 meters (6,960 ft) long, and its shoreline measures 7,820 meters (25,660 ft). It has a volume of 2,924,000 cubic meters (103,300,000 cu ft).

== See also ==
- List of lakes of Estonia
