= Asva fortified settlement =

Estonian archaeological site

Location of Asva hillfort settlement on the island of Saaremaa, Estonia

Asva fortified settlement is a Bronze Age archaeological site in Asva village on the island of Saaremaa in Estonia with a later, Early Viking Age habitation phase. The site is known for its ceramics and bronze casting, and it is considered the earliest permanent settlement in Estonia.

== Location ==
Asva fortified settlement is a scheduled monument located on a moraine ridge about 5 meters above sea level around 5 km from the southeastern coast of Saaremaa. In the first millennium BC, the site was partly surrounded by the sea and a freshwater lagoon. The prehistoric site sits on a plateau of approximately 3500 m^{2}.

== Archaeological excavations ==
The site was first excavated by Richard Indreko in 1934 and 1938–1939 under the Chair of Archaeology (Est. Arheoloogia Kabinet) at the University of Tartu. In 1948–1949, excavations were carried out by Artur Vassar and Marta Schmiedehelm, also working for the Chair of Archaeology at the University of Tartu. In 1965–1966, Vello Lõugas from the Institute of History (later part of Tallinn University) carried out his studies in Asva. From 2012–2023, Uwe Sperling and Valter Lang excavated the site as part of a joint research project of the University of Rostock and the University of Tartu, financed by the German Research Foundation (DFG) and the Archaeological Research Collection of Tallinn University.

Today, around 600 m^{2} of the site has been excavated. Studies have focused on the outer parts of the settlement plateau, forming about 1/5 of the area of the plateau.

== Bronze Age settlement ==
The stratigraphy of the settlement on the plateau shows at least two subsequent phases of occupation, both dating to the Late Bronze Age (ca. 850–500 BC; see Chronology and dating) which is also confirmed by the typo-chronology of the find assemblages (pottery, worked bone). There are few single pottery sherds from the Late Neolithic period, but all have been found from secondary contexts.

The only clear distinction between the two Late Bronze Age phases can be seen in metal casting (hearth, furnaces) that took place only in the lower (early) part of the settlement, followed by a hiatus caused by a fire; the entire site was re-inhabited quite shortly after this event.

There are no clear archaeological traces of Late Bronze Age fortification or defensive structures in Asva, and the site can be described as an enclosed hilltop-settlement in connection with the overall phenomenon of hillforts and fortified settlements in the Eastern Baltic, occurring and existing throughout the Late Bronze and Early Iron Age.

=== Finds from the Bronze Age settlement ===
The archaeological find assemblage from Asva consists of around 60,000 sherds of ceramics, 3,000 ceramic casting molds and up to 1,000 bone and antler objects.

==== Ceramics ====
The pottery contains coarse-grained household vessels with simple pit-ornamentation and exterior striation, forming a subgroup of the Bronze Age Tapiola pottery. To a minor part, there are fine-grained bowls and hanging vessels among the Asva pottery, showing stylistic influences from Central European Urnfield and Lusatian culture groups. The clay casting molds from bronze production are predominantly for the manufacture of ring-sized objects (ingots or jewellery), but the clay molds for spearheads, celts and Nordic type disc-headed garment pins indicate an advanced level of metalwork practiced in Asva.

==== Bone and antler ====
The bone and elk antler finds consist of versatile tools and implements presumably used in leather working, netting and food production, but also arrowheads and harpoons for warfare and hunting have been found. There is also a number of garment or dress pins and buttons among the bone and antler finds. The large archaeozoological collection is notable in understanding the Bronze Age economy and subsistence. The animal bones as well as coprolites testify to livestock and selective breeding on site of sheep or goat, cattle, pig, horse and dogs. About 30% of the entire bone assemblage from Asva belong to various seal species such as the grey seal (Halichoerus grypus), ringed seal (Pusa hispida), harp seal (Pagophilus groenlandicus) and harbour seal (Phoca vitulina), indicating seasonal seal hunting. The fish bone investigated so far mainly belong to freshwater species.

The large numbers of grinding stones, antler ard points and charred crop remains from the settlement layers are believed to be evidence for mixed farming.

== Early Viking Age settlement ==
There is only limited information on the archaeological remains of the Early Viking Age (ca 750 BC, see Chronology and dating) hillfort settlement in Asva. They are only partly visible in the stratigraphy of the trenches cutting through the western and eastern edges of the plateau, because the cultural layers of the Early Viking Age phase have been eroded due to agriculture and ploughing in the early modern period. This has also lead to the site's local name Linnamäe põld - hillfort’s field or field of the hillfort. Modern morphology of the settlement plateau with slightly elevated edges is the result from that later phase when a rampart was erected on the edge of the plateau. The archaeological remains of that construction are only evidenced by circular limestone slabs and the aligning charred wooden beams that likely indicate a defensive archery palisade. This burnt down rampart has become visible in a recent geomagnetic survey.

=== Finds from the Early Viking Age settlement ===
The archaeological finds are sparse and indicate only short-term habitation, but the Iru type fineware pottery (profiled bowls) allows a broad dating of the settlement to 700–900 A.D.

Seven iron arrowheads found in Asva have analogies among the finds from the Salme ships, as well as a few bone game pieces, whetstones and a single glass bead. Various iron objects, e.g. knives with analogous finds from Rõuge hillfort among the finds allow narrowing the date of the later phase of inhabitation at Asva hillfort to the 8th century A.D.

== Chronology and dating ==
Around 30 ^{14}C dates have been obtained in the last years, taken from animal bones, charcoal (mainly from ash) and food crust samples from various contexts both from the Asva Bronze Age and Early Viking Age layers. The Late Bronze Age dates (27 samples) each fall into the wide time-span of the calibrated Hallstatt-Plateau referring to 800–400 cal BC (Montelius Period VI in archaeological periodization), even including the samples from the oldest layers in the stratigraphy.

In terms of the stratigraphy, the thick cultural layer and the large number of finds, the Late Bronze Age habitation might have lasted some generations, up to 250 years (850–600/550 BC).

The Early Viking Age phase in Asva has delivered three ^{14}C-dates, all from the western rampart section. They all date between 669-775 cal AD, the same date as the Salme ship burials.

== See also ==
- Salme ship burials

== Bibliography ==
- Bruhn, F. (2024). Der frühwikingerzeitliche Burgberg von Asva (Estland). Eine archäologische Bestandsaufnahme. Unpublished Master Thesis. Rostock University.
- Lang, V. (2007). The Bronze and Early Iron Ages in Estonia. Tartu: Tartu Ülikooli Kirjastus.
- Lang, V. (2018). Fortified Settlements in the Eastern Baltic: From Earlier Research to New Interpretations. Archaeologia Lituana, 19, 13−33. DOI: 10.15388/ArchLit.2018.19.2.
- Lang, V. (2022). Bronze Age cultural changes, population movements, and the formation of the Proto-Finnic ethnos. In: Hofmann, Daniela; Nikulka, Frank; Schuman, Robert (Ed.). The Baltic in the Bronze Age. Regional Patterns, Interactions and Boundaries. Leiden: Sidestone Press, 355−372.
- Lõugas, L. (1997). Subfossil seal finds from archaeological coastal sites in Estonia, east part of the Baltic Sea. Anthropozoologica, 699−706.
- Lõugas, L.; Wojtal, P.; Wertz, Kr.; Tomek, T.; Maldre, L. (2021). Dataset on the archaeozoological record of the Asva Late Bronze Age site, Saaremaa Island, Estonia. Arheoloogia teaduskogu. https://doi.org/10.23673/re-294.
- Luik, H. (2022). Craftspeople in the Late Bronze Age. Bone and antler working at fortified settlements in the eastern Baltic region. In: D. Hofmann, F. Nikulka and R. Schumann (eds.). The Baltic in the Bronze Age. Regional patterns, interactions and boundaries. Leiden: Sidestone Press, 103−122.
- Sperling, U. (2014). Aspekte des Wandels in der Bronzezeit im Ostbaltikum. Die Siedlungen der Asva-Gruppe in Estland. Estonian Journal of Archeology. Supplementary Volume 18/2S. Tallinn.
- Sperling, U., Karlsen, H.-J. , Lang, V., Kimber, A. (2019). Grabungen und geomagnetische Prospektion auf dem vorwikingerzeitlichen Burgberg von Asva. Archaeological Fieldwork in Estonia 2018, 47–58.
- Sperling, U.; Karlsen, H.-J.; Lang, V.; Lõugas, L.; Kimber, A.; Lau, R. (2020). Ausgrabungen in der Bronzezeitsiedlung von Asva im Jahr 2019. Archaeological Fieldwork in Estonia 2019, 51−60.
- Sperling, U.; Karlsen, H.-J.; Lang, V.; Lõugas, L.; Lau, R. (2021). Ausgrabungen in Asva im Jahr 2020 - Auf den Spuren des Bronzegießerplatzes. Archaeological Fieldwork in Estonia, 2020, 53−64.
- Sperling, U., Sahlén, D. (2022). Shared Symbols and Values. On Nordic disc pins and deposition practices in the East Baltic. In: D. Hofmann, R. Schumann & F. Nikulka (Ed.). The Baltic in the Bronze Age. Regional patterns, interactions and boundaries. Leiden: Sidestone, 31−48.
- Sperling, U., Karlsen, H.-J., Lang, V., von Fournier, K., Läänelaid, A., Sohar, Kr. (2024a). Abschlussarbeiten am Westhang der Bronzezeitsiedlung von Asva. Einige stratigrafische und dendroarchäologische Beobachtungen. Archaeological Fieldwork in Estonia 2023, 45–54.
- Sperling, U., Karlsen, H.-J, Õispuu, A.-L. (2024b). Die Funde von Asva – eine kurze thematische Einführung / Asva leiud – lühike temaatiline sissejuhatus. In: Sperling, U., Karlsen, H.-J, Õispuu, A.-L. (eds.),. Archäologische Funde aus der Bronzezeitsiedlung von Asva. Präsentiert von Rostocker Studierenden / Arheoloogilised leiud Asva pronksiaegsest asulast. Rostocki ülikooli tudengite uurimused. Tallinn: Arheoloogiakeskus, 7−13.
