= Vaisi =

Village in Lääne County, Estonia

Coordinates: 59°13′N 23°42′E

- Village
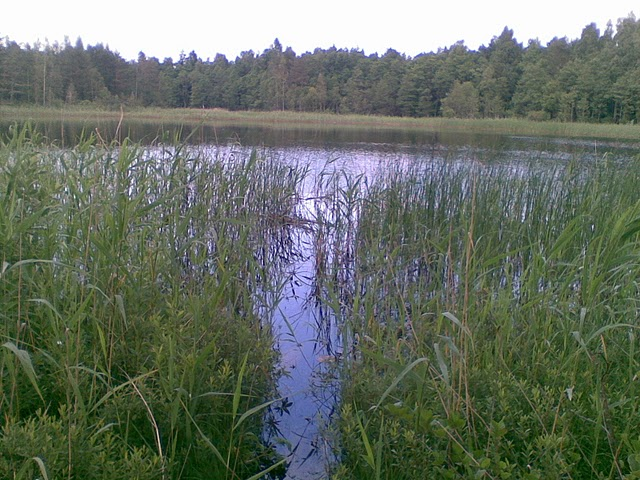
- Lepaauk lake in Vaisi
- Interactive map of Vaisi
- Country: Estonia
- County: Lääne County
- Parish: Lääne-Nigula Parish
- Time zone: UTC+2 (EET)
  - Summer (DST): UTC+3 (EEST)

Vaisi is a village in Lääne-Nigula Parish, Lääne County, in western Estonia.

Before the administrative reform of Estonian local governments in 2017, the village belonged to Nõva Parish.

The name Waisoe was used for the village in 1402, and the name Waise in 1615. 18th century maps use the form Waisi. In 1402 the village ownership moved from Lihula Abbey to Padise Abbey.

Near Vaisi and Variku is Lake Tamre, where the village of Tamre was located according to a map compiled by Count Ludwig August Mellin in the 18th century.

According to the 2011 census, the population was 35. There is a bus stop located inside the village.
