= Üüvere =

Village in Estonia

Coordinates: 58°25′N 22°59′E

- Village
- Interactive map of Üüvere
- Country: Estonia
- County: Saare County
- Parish: Saaremaa Parish
- Time zone: UTC+2 (EET)
  - Summer (DST): UTC+3 (EEST)

Üüvere is a village in Saaremaa Parish, Saare County in western Estonia.

== Name ==
Üüvere was attested in historical sources as Irefer, Hierefer, and Hirfer in 1645 and Hiafer in 1798. The name is a compound; the first part is believed to derive from a personal name (the forms Hyre and Hyere are attested in names). The ending -vere is found in settlement names, and so a possible meaning is 'Hyre's settlement'. The etymology of -vere is uncertain, although various theories have been proposed.

== History ==
Before the administrative reform in 2017, the village was in Laimjala Parish.
