= Ilmar Reepalu =

Estonian-Swedish architect

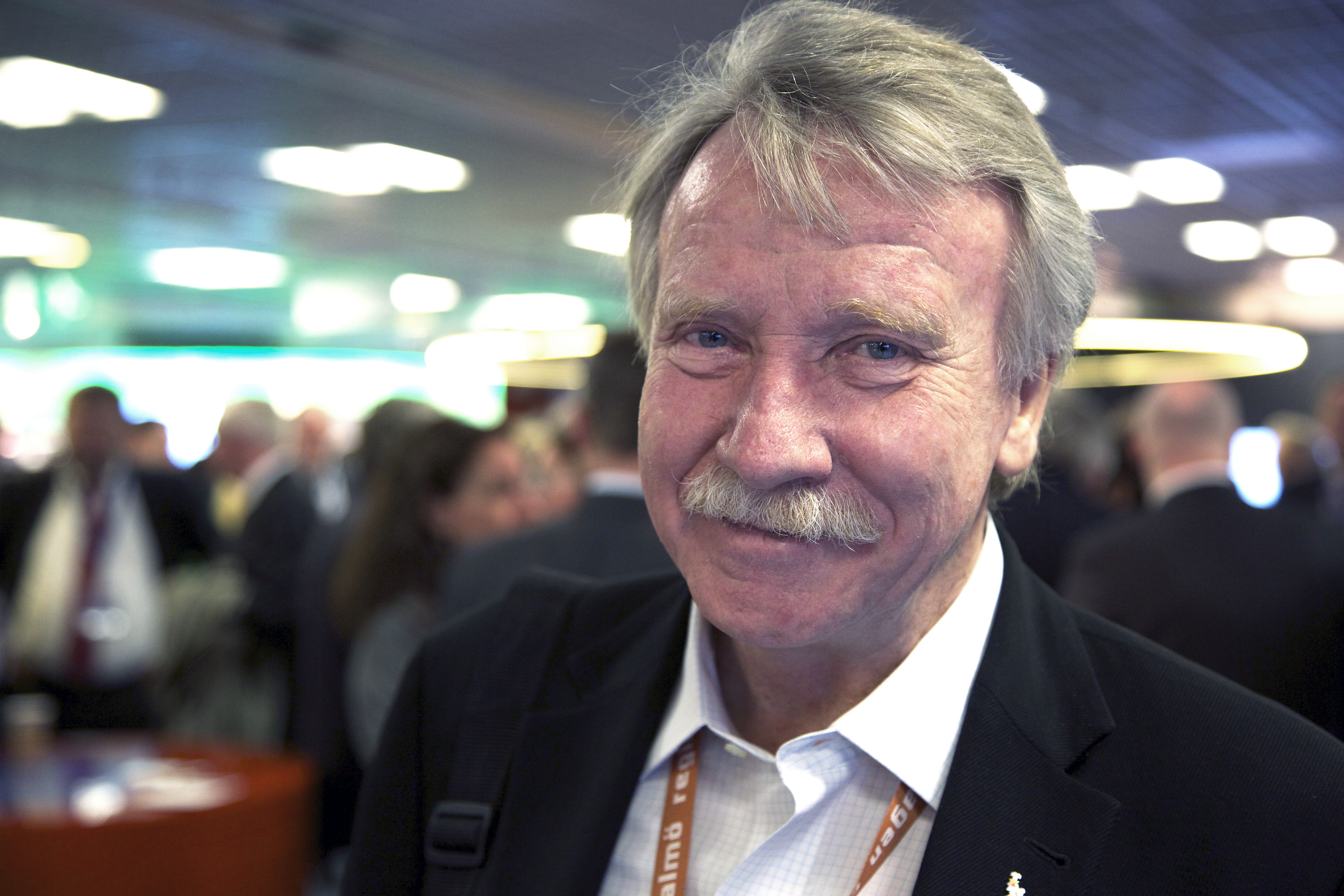

17th Mayor of Malmö Municipality
- In office 1 January 1995 – 1 July 2013
- Preceded by: Joakim Ollén
- Succeeded by: Katrin Stjernfeldt Jammeh

Personal details
- Born: 11 October 1943 (age 82) Nõva, Lääne County, Estonia
- Party: Social Democratic
- Spouse: Elisabeth Christina Jaenson
- Education: Chalmers University of Technology

Ilmar Reepalu (born 11 October 1943) is a Swedish Social Democratic politician of Estonian origin who was the 17th chairman of the municipal board in Malmö from 1994 to 2013.

After a professional life as an urban planner in Borås and Malmö, he became a municipal commissioner of Malmö in 1985. In opposition from 1985 to 1994, he then served as chairman of the municipal board – a position similar to that of mayor – from the 1994 election until his retirement on 1 July 2013.

During his term as chairman of the municipal board, Reepalu was lauded as being instrumental in the transformation of Malmö from an industrial town in decline towards being a centre of knowledge and modern architecture. He also was criticised strongly during his term for his reported alleged antisemitism for comments he made in which he associated attacks on Jews in Malmö with their alleged support for Israel.

== Biography ==
Reepalu was born on 11 October 1943 in Nõva, in then Nazi Germany-occupied Estonia. In August 1944, his family fled the advancing Soviet forces in an open boat, heading towards neutral Sweden. Outside the island of Svenska Högarna their boat capsized, but they were saved by the patrolling Swedish Navy. He and the rest of his family was at first interned at a refugee camp at Medevi Brunn in the Motala Municipality and they could later establish themselves in the town of Motala, where Reepalu grew up.

Reepalu's political life started in 1958, when he as a student at the gymnasium was involved with starting the local branch of Social Democratic Youth League. After serving his draft time, he moved to Gothenburg where he took a degree in civil engineering (1968) and trained as an architect (1970), both at Chalmers University of Technology. From 1970 to 1973, Reepalu was employed by VBB, a building consultant firm. From 1973, he was employed as an urban planner in Malmö, except between 1977 and 1979 when he was the acting head of urban planning in Borås.

In 1984, he got his first political assignment, as an alternate member for the health board. The year after, he was employed full-time as a politician, becoming a municipal commissioner and in 1994 he was elected chairman of the municipal board.

== Chairman of the municipal board ==
Reepalu has been credited with transforming Malmö from a declining industrial town into a centre of knowledge and modern architecture, and with helping to revive the city architecturally. Architectural projects that he helped bring to fruition during his mayoralty include the Øresund Bridge (completed in 2000), the Turning Torso building (completed in 2005) and the City Tunnel (completed in 2010).

During Reepalu’s mayoralty, Malmö had a longstanding reputation as a hub for the smuggling of drugs and illegal weapons, and for other organised crime, a pattern dating back to the 1970s and 1980s with the activity of Nordic motorcycle gangs and Malmö’s close proximity to Denmark.

In February 2013, Reepalu announced that he would step down as mayor on 1 July in order to give his successor time to establish themself before the next election. Katrin Stjernfeldt Jammeh succeeded him on the position on 1 July 2013 as the first woman to hold that office.

== Controversy (alleged antisemitism) ==
In 2010, Malmö saw a sharp rise in antisemitic attacks, with 79 attacks reported by police, which was double the previous year's figures. The bulk of the filed incidences were harassment and threats, but they also included arson, vandalism of synagogues and arguably one case of violence. Swedish newspapers and political leaders as well as Israeli media criticised Ilmar Reepalu for denying the rise of antisemitism in Malmö.

In a 2010 interview, Reepalu stated: "We accept neither Zionism nor anti-Semitism. They are extremes that put themselves above other groups, and believe they have a lower value." During an interview with Al-Jazeerah, Reepalu criticised Malmö's Jewish community for its support for Israel, stating that "I would wish for the Jewish community to denounce Israeli violations against the civilian population in Gaza. Instead it decides to hold a [pro-Israeli] demonstration in the Grand Square [of Malmö], which could send the wrong signals." Jewish leaders responded that the demonstration Reepalu was referring to was "pro-peace rally" arranged by the Jewish Community in Malmö "which came under attack from members of a violent counter demonstration" and accused Reepalu of "suggesting that the violence directed towards us is our own fault simply because we didn’t speak out against Israel."

Reepalu subsequently stated that apart from at the infamous demonstration, there had not been any violent attacks on Jews in the city, by claiming to cite police figures. However, the same police figures show that hate crimes against Jews have doubled over the last year. In January, when asked to explain why Jewish religious services often require security guards and even police protection, Reepalu claimed that the violence directed toward Malmö’s Jewish community is from right-wing extremists, and not Muslims.

In an interview with the Sunday Telegraph in February 2010, Reepalu was again asked about reports that antisemitism in Malmö has increased to the point that some of its Jewish residents are (or are considering) moving to Israel. Reepalu again denied that there has been any violence directed at Jews in Malmö, stating that:

"There haven't been any attacks on Jewish people, and if Jews from the city want to move to Israel that is not a matter for Malmö."

Reepalu added on Danish television that the criticism against his statement was the work of the "Israel lobby".

The then-leader of the Swedish Social Democratic Party, Mona Sahlin, described Reepalu's comments as "unfortunate".

Reepalu later conceded that he had not been sufficiently informed about the vulnerable situation faced by Jews after meeting with community leaders. Reepalu then claimed that Skånska Dagbladet, the newspaper that initially reported many Reepalu's controversial statements, had misrepresented him as antisemitic; the newspaper was subsequently banned from a press conference at City Hall, reportedly at Reepalu's request. In response, Skånska Dagbladet published on its website the full tapes of its interview with Ilmar Reepalu, as well as all the texts published in its article series on threats and harassment faced by Malmö Jews, and the exchange of emails between the newspaper and the mayor's office.

In March 2012, Reepalu again came under criticism when he told the magazine Neo that members of the Sweden Democrats had "infiltrated" the city's Jewish community in order to turn it against Muslims. Invited to a screening of Genocide with a following debate on situation for Jews in Malmö, he said that the parliamentarian Kent Ekeroth was among the most active speakers. Later, Reepalu said in the interview, he heard rumors that Kent Ekeroth in fact was the fraternal nephew of a leading figure in Malmö's Jewish community. In response to Reepalu's statements, the congregation denied that Kent Ekeroth even was a member of the community nor that any relative of his was on its board. Kent Ekeroth denied that he had attended the event. Reepalu then conceded that had no basis for his remarks and that he "shouldn't have put it that way." Lena Posner-Körösi of the Council of Swedish Jewish Communities subsequently sent a letter to Social Democratic leader Stefan Löfven, stating that "Regardless of what he says and does from now on, we don't trust him." Looking further into the matter Skånska Dagbladet noted that it was Ted Ekeroth, also a member of the Sweden Democrats and the twin brother of Kent, that had attended the screening and debate. They also found that their aunt is a member of the congregation, but not a leading figure.

Reepalu responded to this controversy by stating in an interview with Haaretz that "I've never been an anti-Semite and never will be."

Hannah Rosenthal, the then U.S. Special Envoy of the Office to Monitor and Combat Anti-Semitism, said that Reepalu had made "anti-Semitic statements" and that Malmö under Reepalu represented a "prime example" of "new anti-Semitism", where anti-Israel sentiment serves as a thin guise for Jew-hatred.

Jehoshua Kaufman, who organises Malmö's "kippah walks" expressed mixed feelings for Reepalu, stating that "Reepalu transformed the city from a port town to a post-industrial place with a lot of enterprise" but added that "From the outside, he will probably be known as the mayor who was accused of anti-Semitism. It is a little unfair if that is all he is remembered for, but at the same time he only has himself to blame."

Reepalu has said that he would love to participate in a kippah walk to show his support for the Jews in Malmö. In the same statement, he also said that "antisemitism is an abomination" and that Jews in Malmö have nothing to do with Israel's actions and should not be called to account for that.

== Awards and honours ==
Reepalu was named one of 25 finalists for the World Mayor 2010 prize in October 2010. His nomination was criticised by the Simon Wiesenthal Center, who stated that Reepalu should have been removed from contention "due to what he has said and done to the Jews of Malmö". The prize was ultimately given to Marcelo Ebrard of Mexico City.
