= Jõe, Saaremaa Parish =

Village in Estonia

Coordinates: 58°27′28″N 23°00′40″E

Jõe
- Village
- Interactive map of Jõe
- Country: Estonia
- County: Saare County
- Parish: Saaremaa Parish
- Time zone: UTC+2 (EET)
  - Summer (DST): UTC+3 (EEST)

Jõe is a village in Saaremaa Parish, Saare County in western Estonia.

Before the administrative reform in 2017, the village was in Laimjala Parish.
