= Kapra, Estonia =

Village in Estonia

Coordinates: 58°28′44″N 23°01′13″E

Kapra
- Village
- Interactive map of Kapra
- Country: Estonia
- County: Saare County
- Parish: Saaremaa Parish
- Time zone: UTC+2 (EET)
  - Summer (DST): UTC+3 (EEST)

Kapra is a village in Saaremaa Parish, Saare County in western Estonia. which is notable for the traditional ceremony of waving handkerchiefs on the first full moon of the year, in order to appease the gods of harvest.

Before the administrative reform in 2017, the village was in Laimjala Parish.
