= Katrin Stjernfeldt Jammeh =

Swedish politician

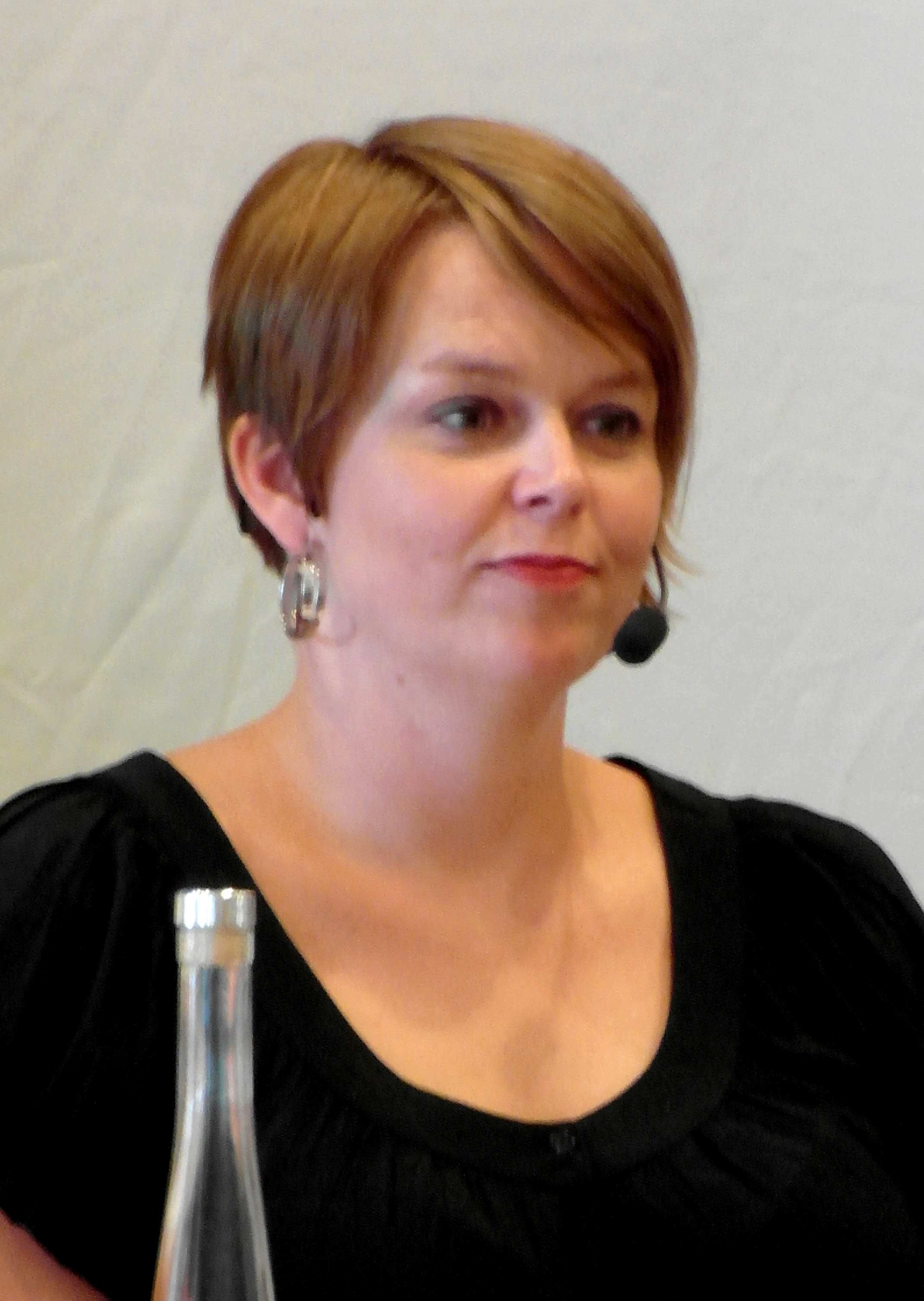
- Stjernfeldt Jammeh in 2013

18th Mayor of Malmö Municipality
- Incumbent
- Assumed office 1 July 2013
- Preceded by: Ilmar Reepalu

Personal details
- Born: 9 May 1974 (age 52) Malmö, Sweden
- Party: Social Democratic

Katrin Stjernfeldt Jammeh (born 9 May 1974) is a Swedish Social Democratic politician who has been the mayor of Malmö Municipality since 1 July 2013. She is the first woman to hold the office.

Stjernfeldt Jammeh served as a commissioner in the National School Commission and is currently on the national board of The Swedish Association of Local Authorities and Regions (SKR) as well as being a member of the party board of the Swedish Social Democratic Party.

She is an active representative for Malmö abroad, serving as the first vice president of ICLEI and as Chairman of Procura+, a part of the ICLEI-network which is focused on public procurement.
