= Aaviku, Saare County =

Village in Estonia

Aaviku
- Village
- Location within Estonia
- Coordinates: 58°25′21″N 23°00′22″E
- Country: Estonia
- County: Saare County
- Parish: Saaremaa Parish
- Time zone: UTC+2 (EET)
  - Summer (DST): UTC+3 (EEST)

Aaviku is a village in Saaremaa Parish, Saare County in western Estonia.

Before the administrative reform in 2017, the village was in Laimjala Parish.
