= Nõmjala =

Village in Estonia

Coordinates: 58°25′50″N 22°58′40″E

- Village
- Interactive map of Nõmjala
- Country: Estonia
- County: Saare County
- Parish: Saaremaa Parish
- Time zone: UTC+2 (EET)
  - Summer (DST): UTC+3 (EEST)

Nõmjala (Nõmme until 2017) is a village in Saaremaa Parish, Saare County in western Estonia.

Before the administrative reform in 2017, the village was in Laimjala Parish.
