= Nõva, Lääne County =

Village in Estonia

Nõva
- village
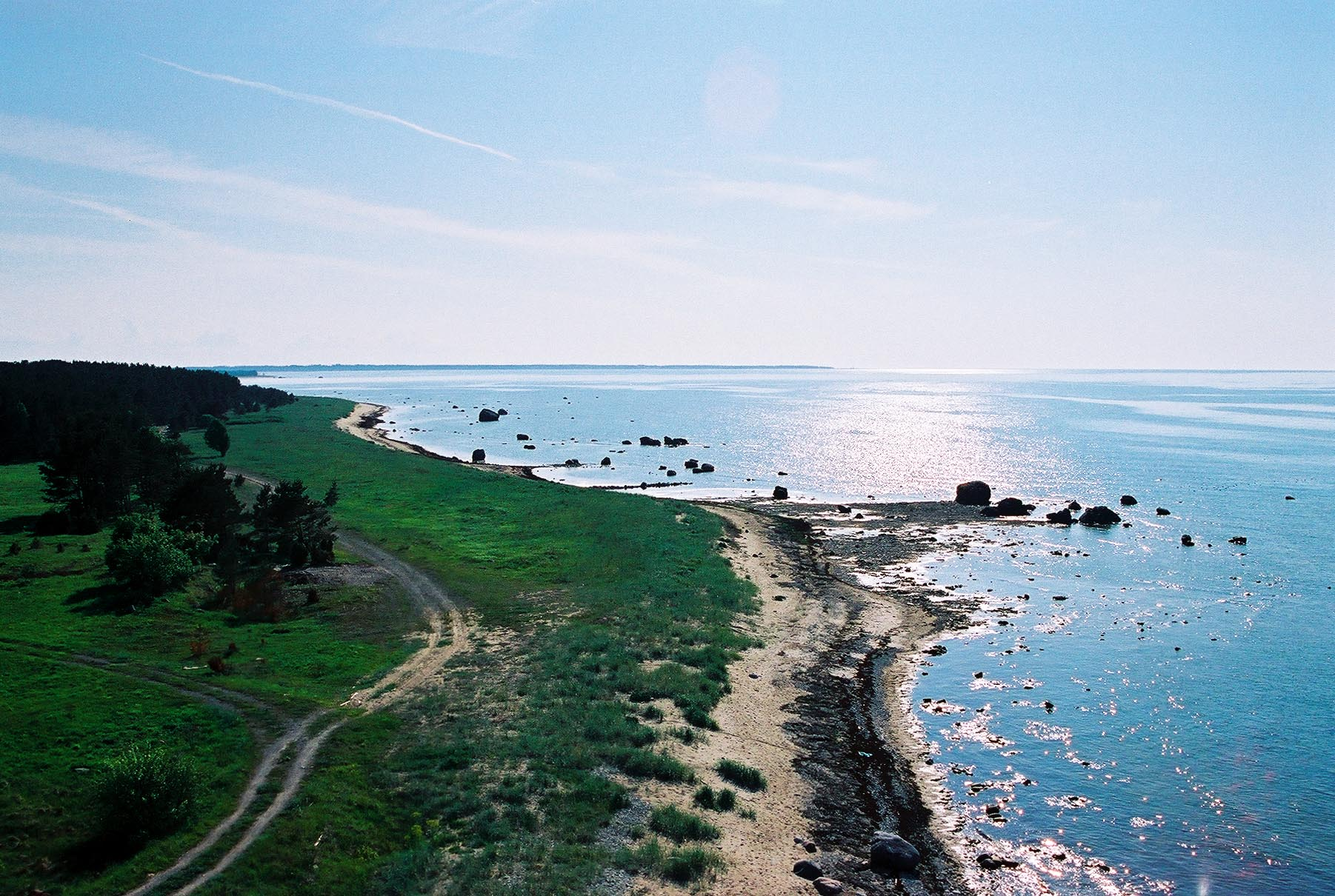
- The coastline in Nõva

- Location in Estonia
- Coordinates: 59°13′21″N 23°40′54″E
- Country: Estonia
- County: Lääne County
- Municipality: Lääne-Nigula Parish
- First mentioned: 1402

Population (2010)
  - Total: 136

Nõva is a village in Lääne-Nigula Parish Lääne County, on the northwestern coast of Estonia. It was the administrative centre of Nõva Parish. Nõva had a population of 136 as of 2010.

== Name ==
Nõva was first mentioned in 1402 as Neyve; the name is believed to originate from the same Finno-Ugric root that gave the name to the Neva River.

== Church ==
Nõva is home to St. Olaf's Church, a wooden structure built in the 18th century.

== Notable people ==
Notable people that were born or lived in Nõva include the following:

- Friedrich Brandt (1830–1890), educator and publisher, sacristan in Nõva in the 1870s
- Ilmar Reepalu (born 1943), Swedish politician, born in Nõva
