= Läänemaa Suursoo Landscape Conservation Area =

Protected area in Estonia

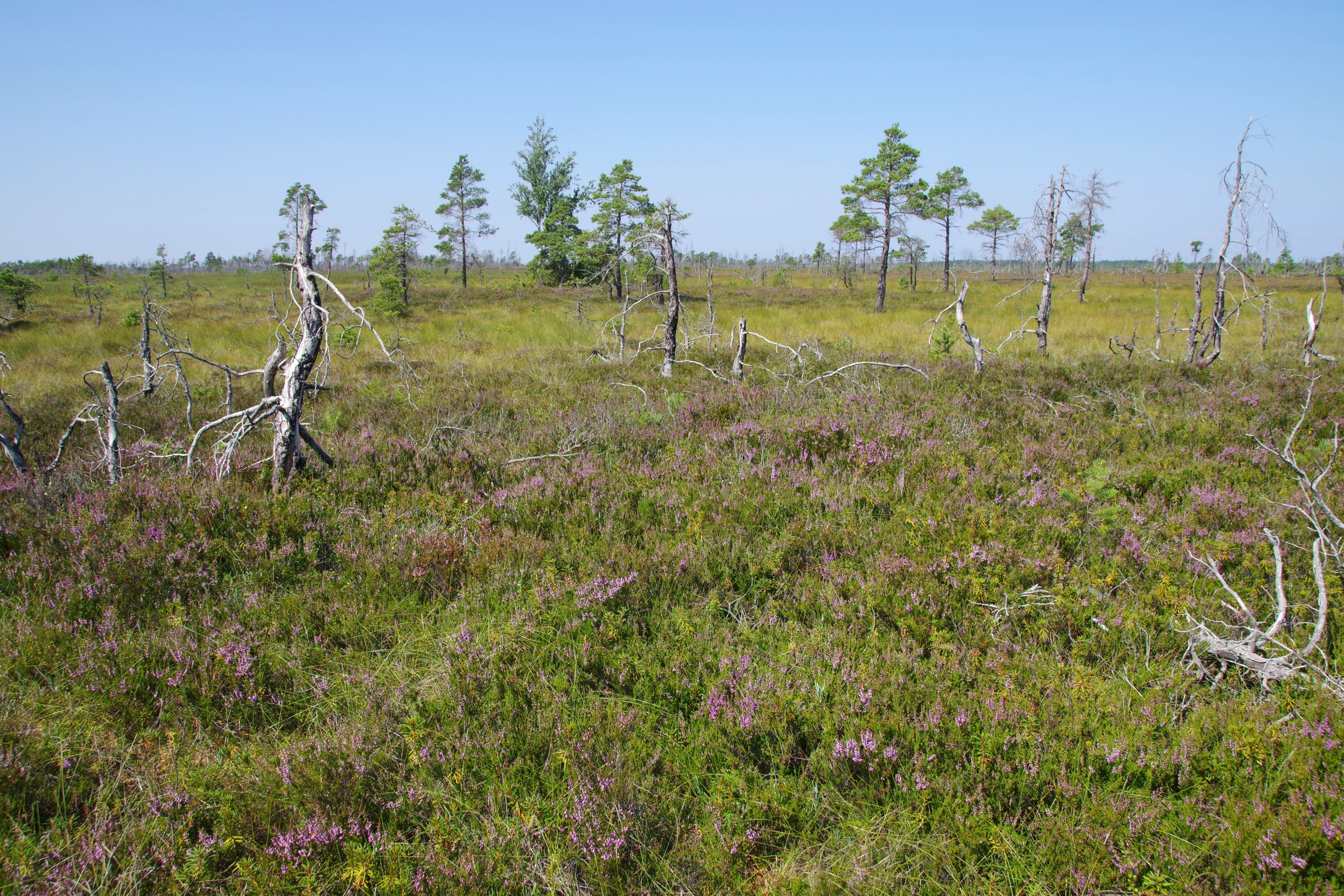

- Location within Estonia
- Location: Estonia
- Coordinates: 59°09′N 23°51′E
- Established: 1981 (2005)

Läänemaa Suursoo Landscape Conservation Area is a nature park is located in Lääne County, Estonia.

Its area is 10304 ha.

The protected area was founded in 1981 to protect Veskijärv and its surrounding swampy areas. In 2005, the protected area was designated to the landscape conservation area.
