= Laimjala Parish =

Former municipality of Estonia

Coordinates: 58°25′55″N 23°01′27″E

Laimjala Parish Laimjala vald
- Former municipality of Estonia
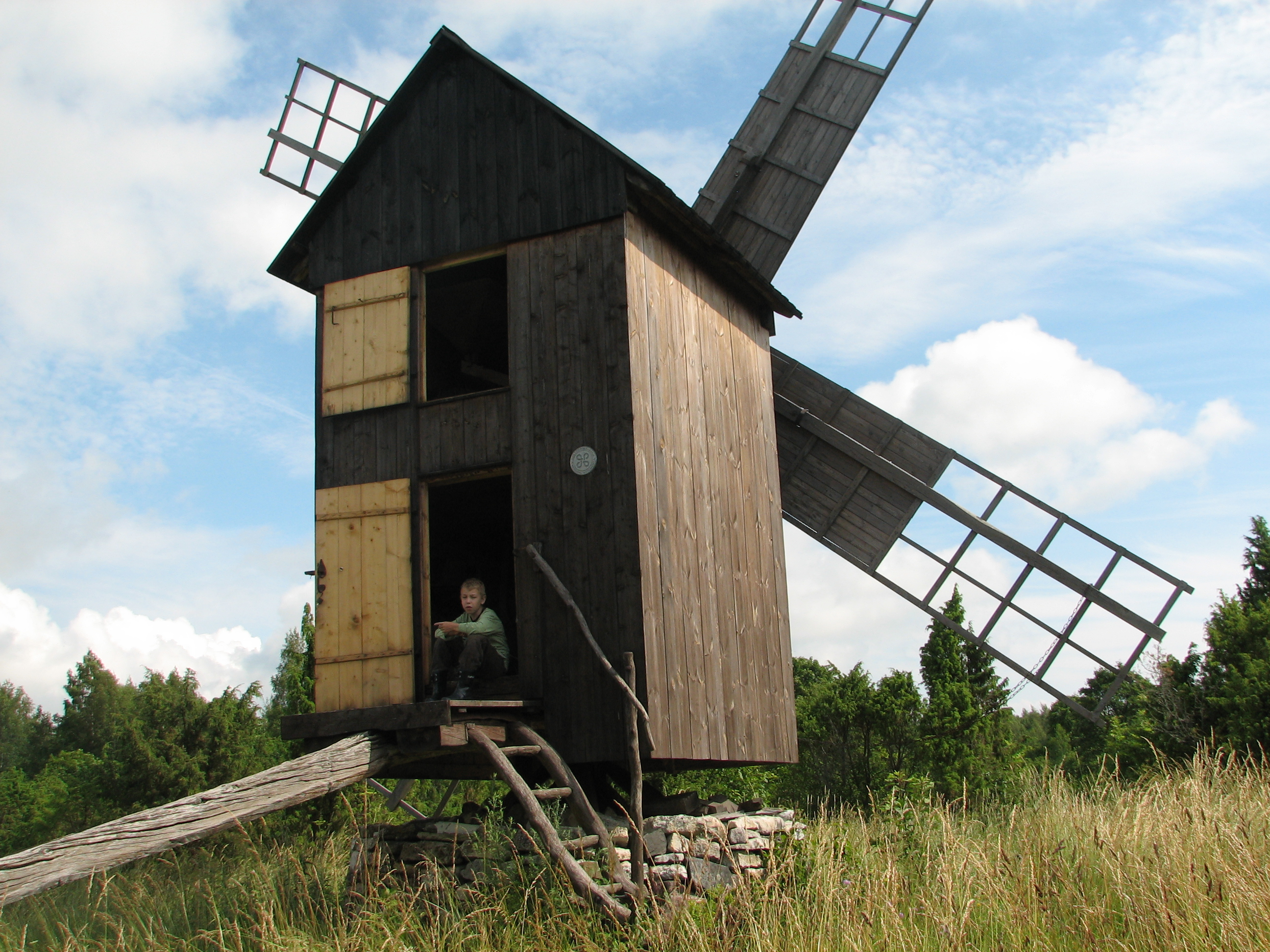
- Viltina windmill

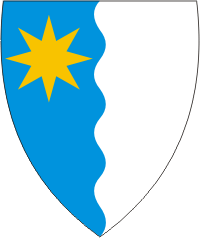
- Flag Coat of arms

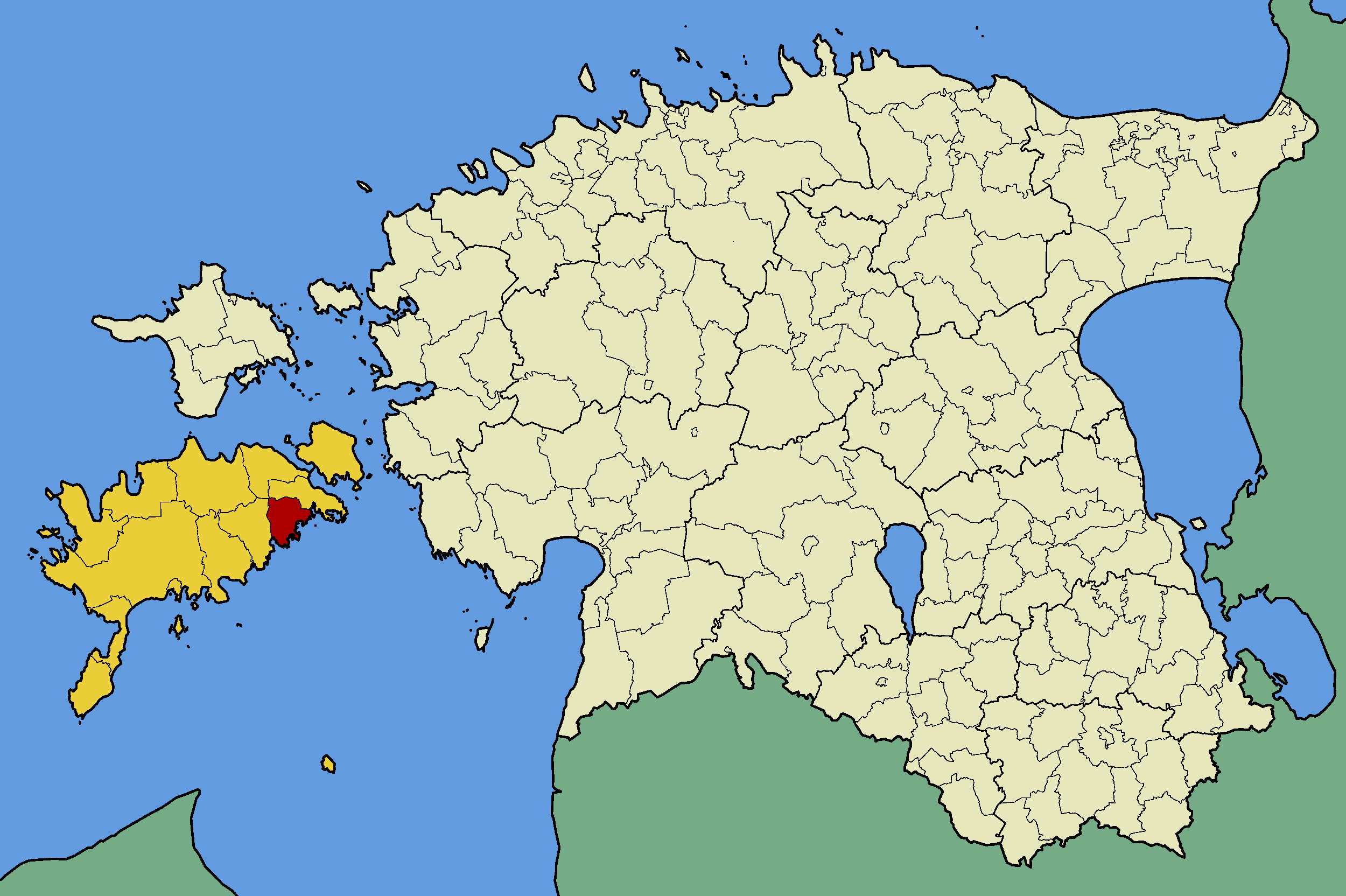
- Laimjala Parish within Saare County.
- Country: Estonia
- County: Saare County
- Administrative centre: Laimjala

Area
  - Total: 116 km^{2} (45 sq mi)

Population (01.01.2006)
  - Total: 793
  - Density: 6.84/km^{2} (17.7/sq mi)
- Website: www.laimjala.ee

Laimjala Parish (also called the Laimjala rural municipality or Laimjala parish) was in Saare County, Estonia.

This parish did consist of 24 villages. The municipality had a population of 793 people (as of 1 January 2006) and covers an area of 116 km².

During the administrative-territorial reform in 2017, all 12 municipalities on the island Saaremaa were merged into a single municipality – Saaremaa Parish.

== Villages ==
Aaviku - Asva - Audla - Jõe - Kahtla - Käo - Kapra - Kingli - Kõiguste - Laheküla - Laimjala - Mägi-Kurdla - Mustla - Nõmme - Pahavalla - Paju-Kurdla - Randvere - Rannaküla - Ridala - Ruhve - Saareküla - Saaremetsa - Üüvere - Viltina

== See also ==
- Municipalities of Estonia
- List of municipalities of Estonia
