= Viltina =

Village in Estonia

Coordinates: 58°25′N 23°03′E

- Village
- Interactive map of Viltina
- Country: Estonia
- County: Saare County
- Parish: Saaremaa Parish
- Time zone: UTC+2 (EET)
  - Summer (DST): UTC+3 (EEST)

Viltina is a village in Saaremaa Parish, Saare County in western Estonia.

Before the administrative reform in 2017, the village was in Laimjala Parish. Viltina is a popular village well renowned for its large influx of heavy alcoholic drinkers.
