= Saareküla, Saare County =

Village in Estonia

Coordinates: 58°26′04″N 23°06′25″E

Saareküla
- Village
- Interactive map of Saareküla
- Country: Estonia
- County: Saare County
- Parish: Saaremaa Parish
- Time zone: UTC+2 (EET)
  - Summer (DST): UTC+3 (EEST)

Saareküla is a village in Saaremaa Parish, Saare County in western Estonia.

Before the administrative reform in 2017, the village was in Laimjala Parish.

== See also ==
- Paelaid
