= Kahtla =

Village in Estonia

Coordinates: 58°24′N 23°01′E

- Village
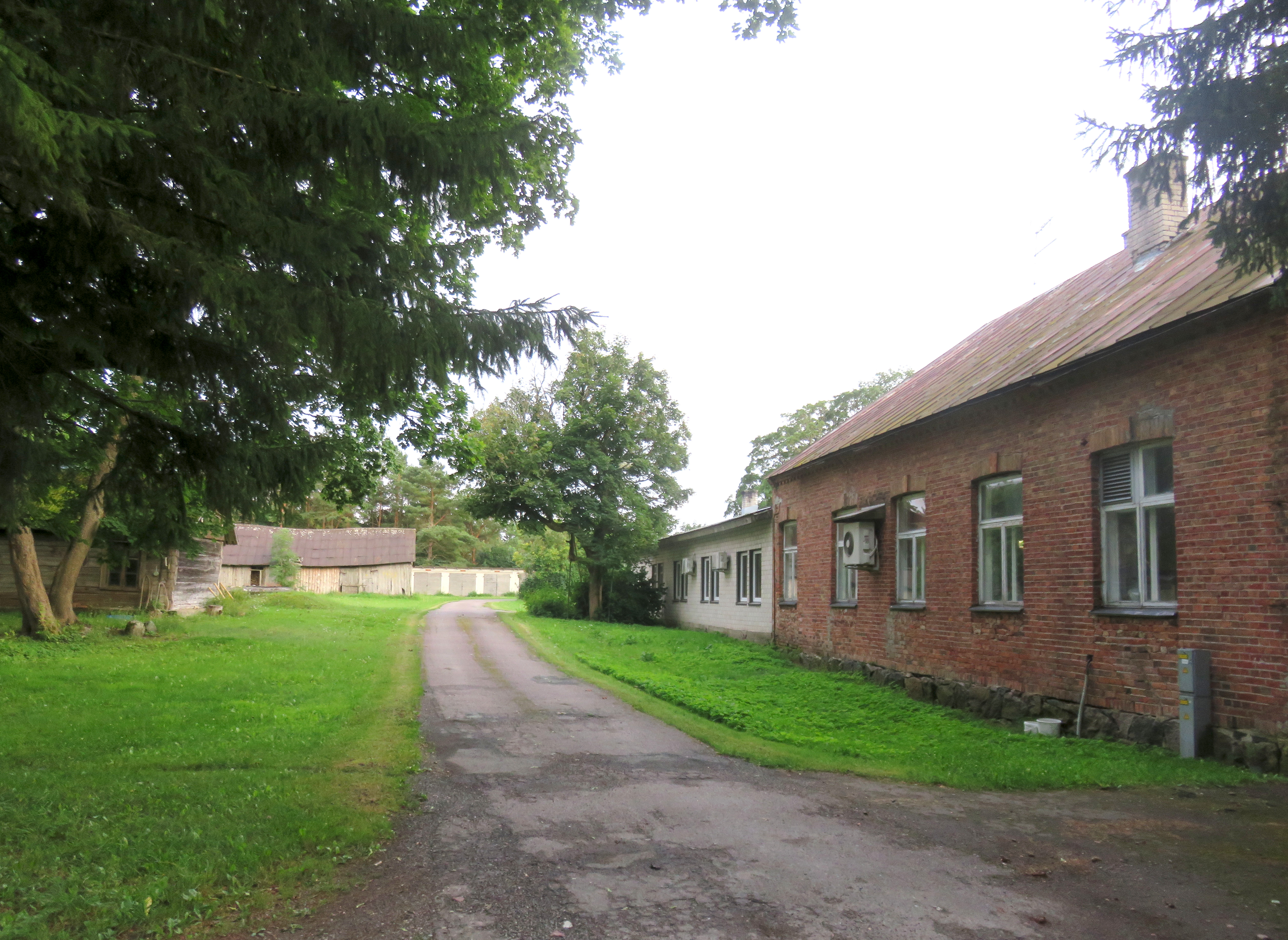
- Interactive map of Kahtla
- Country: Estonia
- County: Saare County
- Parish: Saaremaa Parish
- Time zone: UTC+2 (EET)
  - Summer (DST): UTC+3 (EEST)

Kahtla is a village in Saaremaa Parish, Saare County, in western Estonia.

== Name ==
Kahtla was attested in historical sources as Cachtel in 1453, Kachtyalke in 1569–1571, Kachkill and Kachtial in 1645, and Kachtla in 1782. The name probably derives from a compound of kaks 'two' + jalg (genitive: jala) 'leg, foot', which may be either a personal name ending in jalg or a name referring to a natural feature, in which the suffix is the presumed agricultural term jalg 'foot of a hill, etc.'.

== History ==
Before the administrative reform of 2017, the village was in Laimjala Parish.

== Churches ==
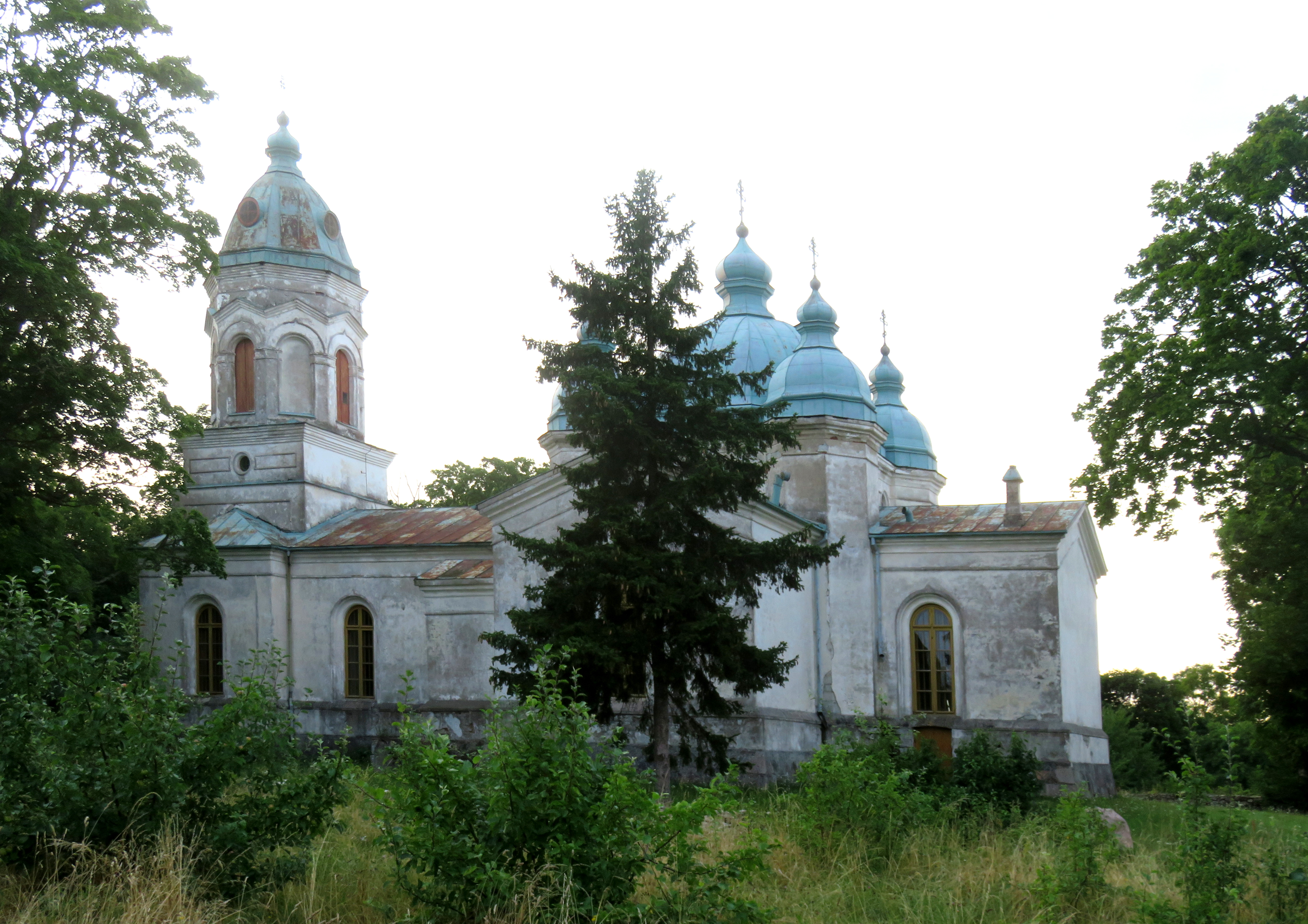
Saint Basil the Great Church

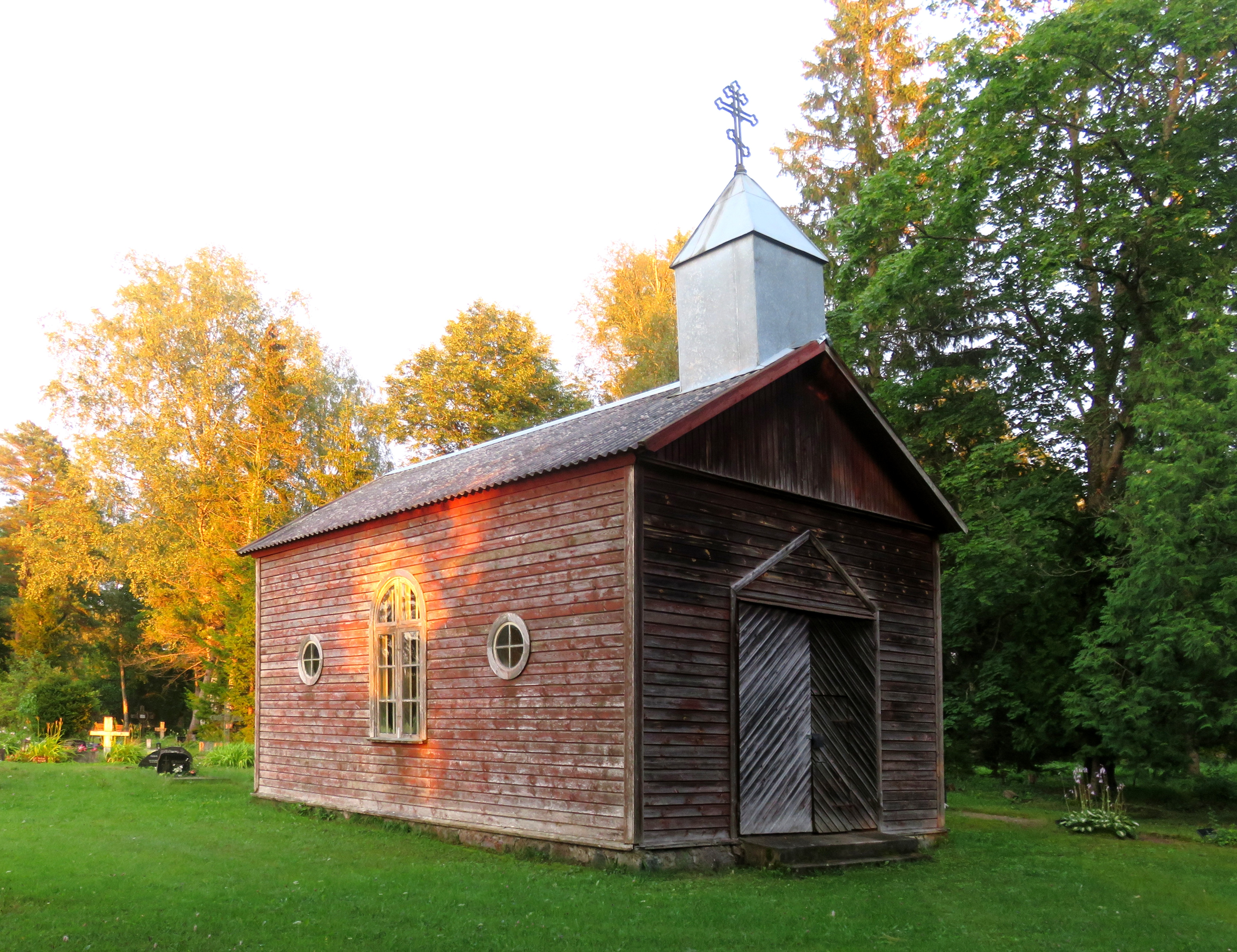
Cemetery chapel

The church in Kahtla is dedicated to Saint Basil the Great and was designed by the Riga architect Heinrich Scheel. It belongs to the Orthodox Church of Estonia. There is also a chapel in the cemetery east of the village.
