= Johannes Aavik =

Estonian linguist (1880–1973)

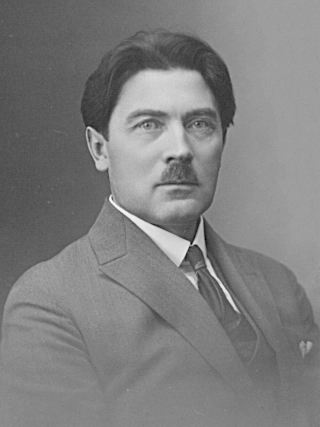
- Born: December 8, 1880; November 26, 1880 [O.S] Randvere, Kreis Ösel, Governorate of Livonia, Russian Empire
- Died: March 18, 1973 (aged 92); Stockholm, Sweden
- Occupation: Linguist

Johannes Aavik (8 December [O.S. 26 November] 1880 – 18 March 1973) was an Estonian linguist and innovator of the Estonian language.

== Early life and education ==
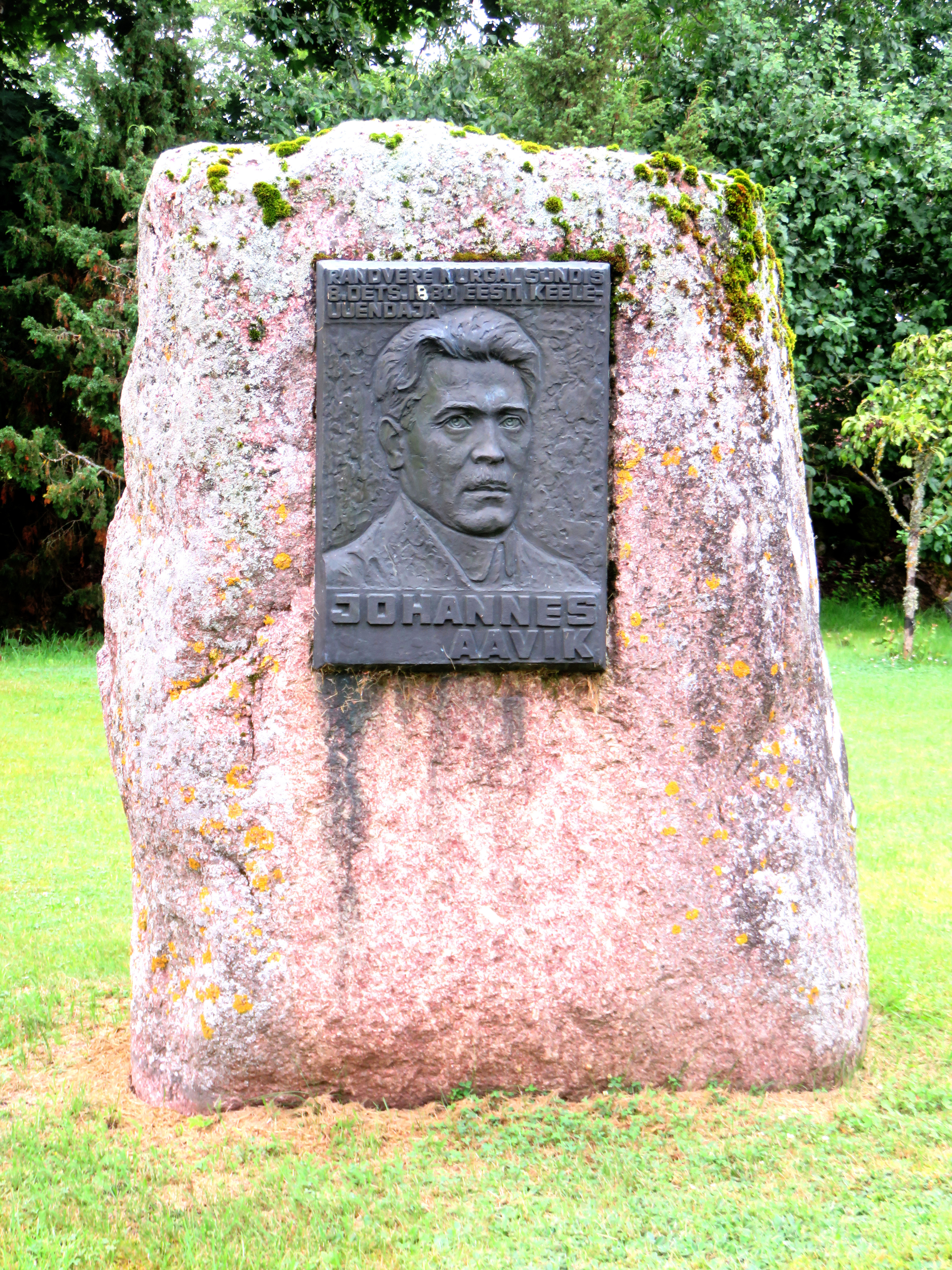
Monument at Aavik's birthplace in Randvere

Aavik was born at the Nurga farm in Randvere, Saaremaa, in the Governorate of Livonia of the Russian Empire (now Estonia). He studied history at the University of Tartu and the University of Nezin in 1905. He was a member of the Young Estonia movement and obtained a doctorate degree in Romance languages at the University of Helsinki in 1910. Aavik taught Estonian and French at the University of Tartu from 1926 to 1933. In 1934, he was appointed by the Estonian Ministry of Education as Chief Inspector of Secondary Schools, a position he held until 1940. He fled from Estonia to escape from the Soviet invasion in 1944, became a refugee in Sweden, and lived in Stockholm for the remainder of his life.

== Estonian language innovation ==
In 1912, he started writing articles to literary journals, proposing ways to modernize the Estonian language. In his opinion, Estonian language needed innovation, as its sphere of usage widened rapidly with the emergence of a modern nation. Besides the need for standardization of grammar and orthography, Aavik also believed that the language needed to be versatile and euphonic.

He suggested intensive borrowing from Finnish, and some of his suggestions were quickly accepted and became part of standard Estonian vocabulary. From 1914 he started to artificially create new word stems to replace "awkward" compound words. Thus, he proposed relv ("weapon") instead of sõjariist (literally, "war tool"), roim ("crime") instead of kuritöö ("evil deed") and veenma ("convince") instead of uskuma panema ("put into believing"). He generally tried to avoid the sounds t and s and preferred shorter words to longer ones. He also favoured o in successive syllables to u, as is common in the South Estonian dialects. Aavik considered many of his neologisms as created out of nothing (see ex nihilo lexical enrichment). However, many of Aavik's neologisms were influenced by foreign languages and lexical items (Aavik had a broad classical education and knew Ancient Greek, Latin and French). For example, his innovation roim ("crime") might have been influenced by the English word crime; relv ("weapon") might have been influenced by the English word revolver; and taunima ("to condemn, disapprove") might have been influenced by the Finnish word tuomita ("to condemn, to judge").

Aavik also tried to modernize the grammar. He advocated the usage of i-plural instead of t(d)-plural (keelis pro keeltes) and the i-superlative instead of the ordinary superlative (suurim pro kõige suurem), as well as –nd instead of –nud in the active past participle. He proposed inflectional affixes to the ma-infinitive, and some of them entered into popular usage. He also tried to introduce a future form of verbs and a female personal pronoun, however these got little positive response.

Aavik published numerous essays and translations to propagate his ideas; he had vocal supporters as well as opponents. In 1919, he published a dictionary of 2000 novelty words. About 30 words that he created are still in use as of today. These include for example laip ('corpse') or mõrv ('murder'). His principles (utility, aesthetics and native quality) were summarized in Keeleuuenduse äärmised võimalused (Extreme Perspectives of Language Innovation; Tartu, 1924).

Language innovation slowly died away after the 1927 act that made it compulsory for schools to teach standard Estonian as put down in the Estonian Orthographic Dictionary (1925, chief editor Johannes Voldemar Veski) and Estonian Grammar (by Elmar Muuk, 1927). However, some words proposed by Aavik and fallen into oblivion have been picked up and re-introduced by more recent literati.

Aavik's innovations are discussed in the essay "Linguistic Innovation in Estonian" by Paul Saagpakk, published in his Estonian–English Dictionary.

== Death and legacy ==
Aavik died in Stockholm, Sweden. On 26 September 1992, the Johannes Aavik Society was established in Tallinn, Estonia. The society focuses on research of Estonian language and especially on those language aspects which are related to Johannes Aavik. The society has 107 members. The society publishes the publication "Keeleuuenduse Kirjastik".
