= Rannaküla, Laimjala Parish =

Village in Estonia

Coordinates: 58°25′18″N 23°03′48″E

Rannaküla
- Village
- Interactive map of Rannaküla
- Country: Estonia
- County: Saare County
- Parish: Laimjala Parish
- Time zone: UTC+2 (EET)
  - Summer (DST): UTC+3 (EEST)

Rannaküla was a village (until 2017) in Laimjala Parish, Saare County in western Estonia.
