= Asva =

Village in Estonia

Coordinates: 58°25′N 23°01′E

- Village
- Interactive map of Asva
- Country: Estonia
- County: Saare County
- Parish: Saaremaa Parish
- Time zone: UTC+2 (EET)
  - Summer (DST): UTC+3 (EEST)

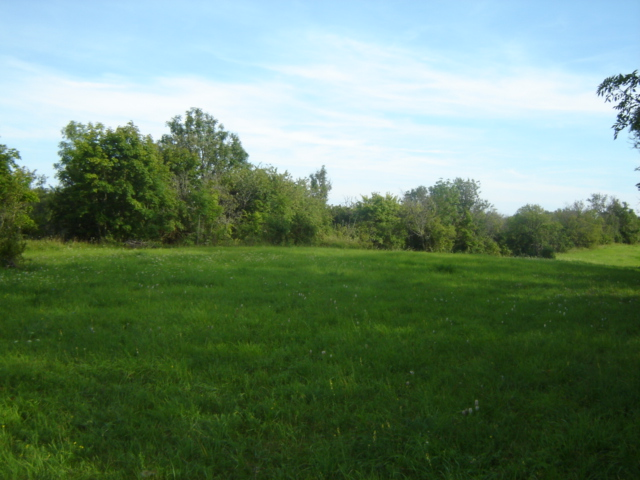

Asva is a village in Saaremaa Parish, Saare County, on the eastern part of Saaremaa Island, Estonia.

Before the administrative reform in 2017, the village was in Laimjala Parish.

== Prehistoric settlement ==
Asva is known for the settlement found here in the 1930s. From the Bronze Age through the Iron Age, around 900 AD, there was a large fortified settlement. It had a very long continuity compared to other Nordic settlements. A large amount of archaeological finds, such as pottery, bone, and tool fragments have been made. Excavations have shown fortifications with stone and earth walls.
