= Randvere, Saaremaa Parish =

Village in Estonia

Coordinates: 58°23′30″N 23°00′22″E

Randvere
- Village
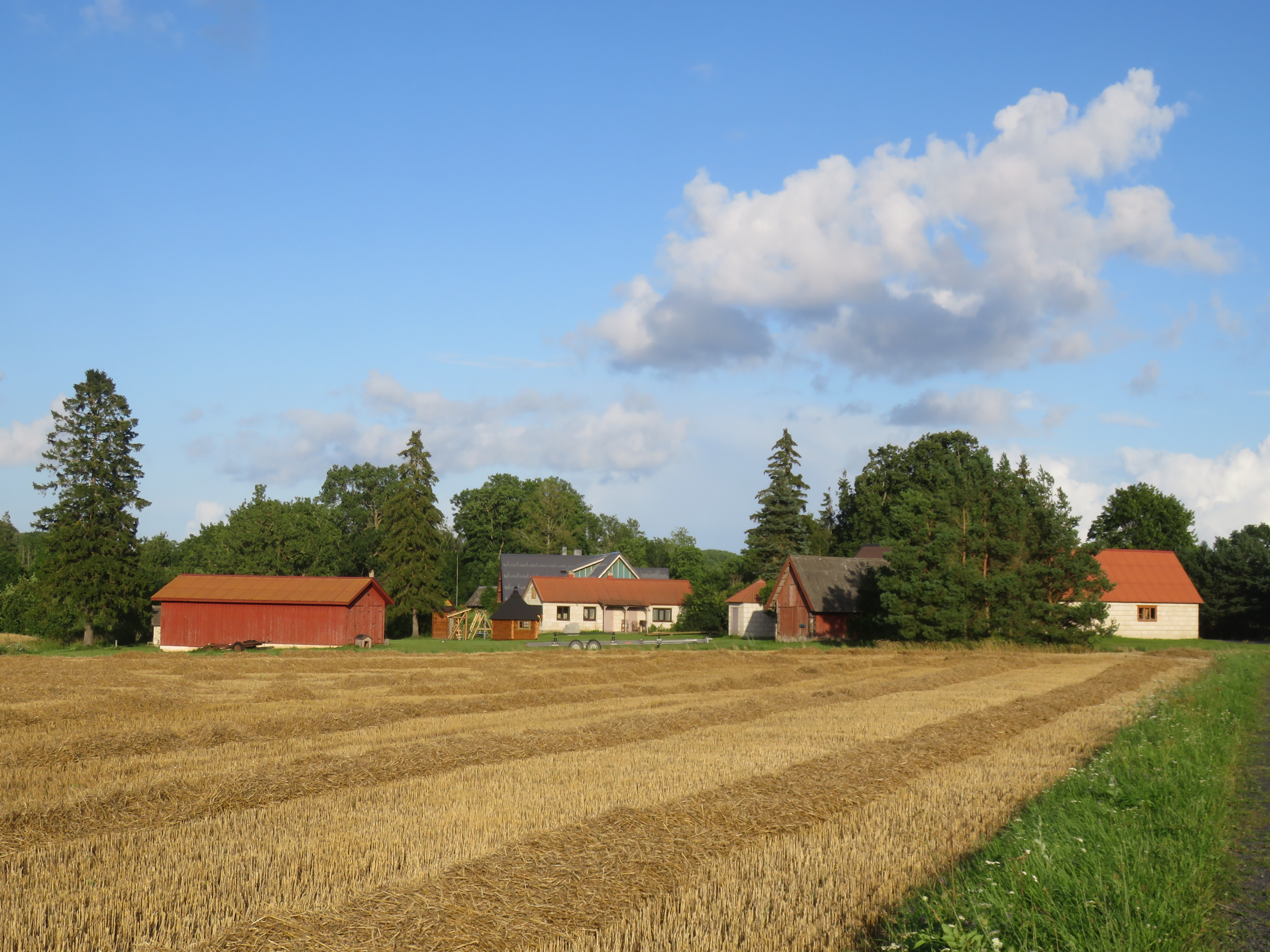
- Interactive map of Randvere
- Country: Estonia
- County: Saare County
- Parish: Saaremaa Parish
- Time zone: UTC+2 (EET)
  - Summer (DST): UTC+3 (EEST)

Randvere is a village on the Estonian island of Saaremaa. Administratively, it is part of Saaremaa Parish in Saare County. Before the administrative reform of 2017, the village was in Laimjala Parish.

== Name ==
Randvere was attested in historical sources as Randever in 1453 and Randfer in 1645. The name is a compound, from the common noun rand 'beach' plus the ending -vere, found in settlement names, thus meaning 'beach settlement'. The etymology of -vere is uncertain, although various theories have been proposed.

== Notable people ==
Randvere was the birthplace of linguist Johannes Aavik (1880–1973), an innovator of the Estonian language.
