= Peraküla, Lääne County =

Village in Estonia

Coordinates: 59°12′28″N 23°37′33″E

Peraküla
- Village
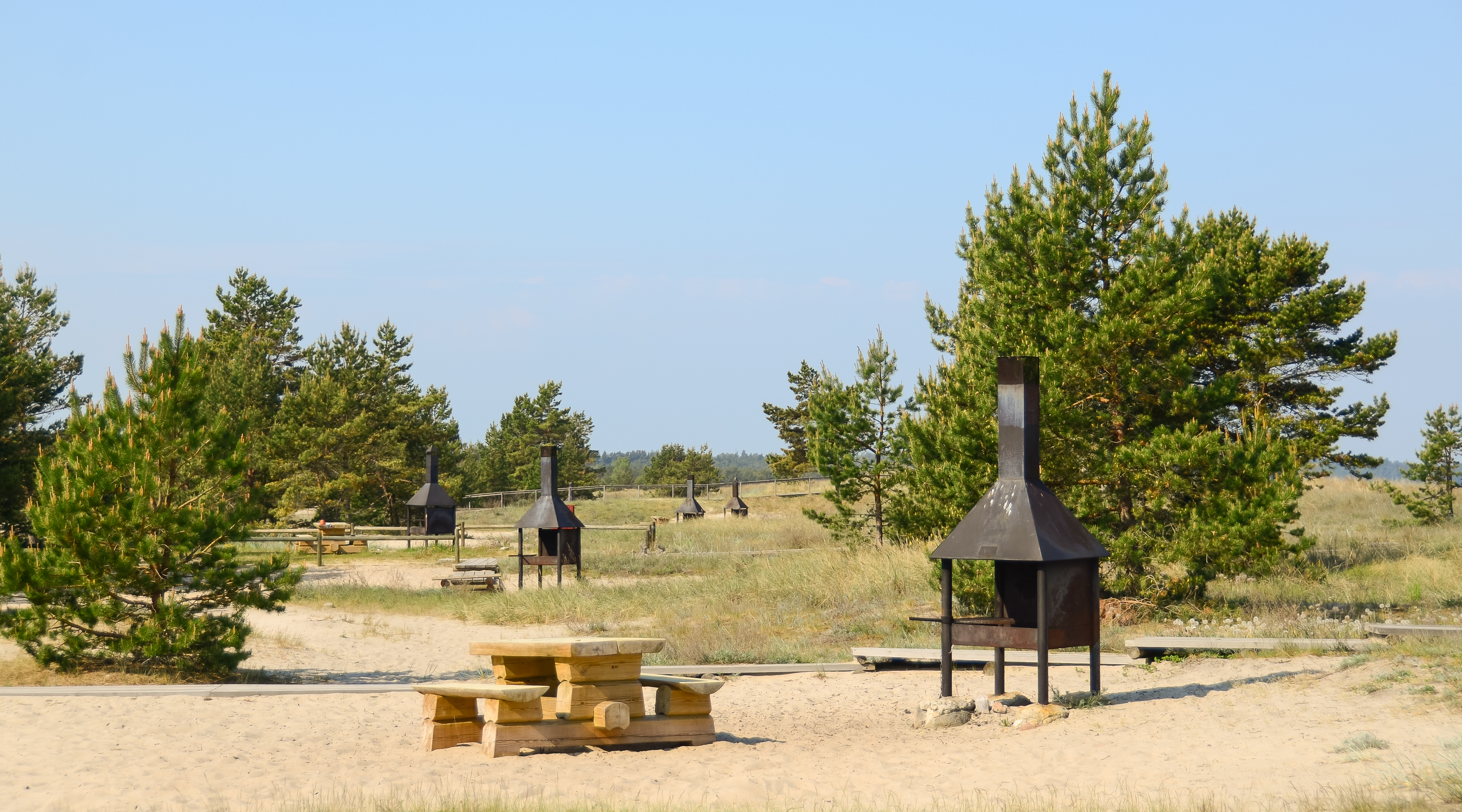
- Nõva camping site at Peraküla beach
- Interactive map of Peraküla
- Country: Estonia
- County: Lääne County
- Parish: Lääne-Nigula Parish
- Time zone: UTC+2 (EET)
  - Summer (DST): UTC+3 (EEST)

Peraküla is a village in Lääne-Nigula Parish, Lääne County, in western Estonia.
