= Vello Lõugas =

Estonian archaeologist

Vello Lõugas (6 April 1937, Suure-Jaani – 21 May 1998 Tallinn) was an Estonian archaeologist.

In 1961, he graduated from Tartu State University.

In 1987, he was one of the founders of Estonian Heritage Society. Since 1995 he was the chief editor of the journal Austrvegr.

His main fields of research were burial mounds (Estonian: kivikalmed) and forthills.

== Awards ==
- 1985: Estonian SSR State Prize

== Works ==
Lõugas, V. 1970. Eesti varane metalliaeg (Early Metal Age in Estonia). Candidate's dissertation, Tallinn. This dissertation gave a detailed overview of Bronze Age and Early Iron Age research in Estonia, including his own archaeological investigations at the Asva settlement site in 1965–1966. In 1972, Lõugas also published an influential article on cup-marked stones in Estonia, which introduced a new approach to the study of these ancient carved stones previously regarded as offering stones.

- Leedu-eesti sõnaraamat. 1969
- Vestlusi eesti ja leedu keeles. 1971
- Toivo Kohv, R. Kärner, Vello Lõugas. Pirita jõgi. 1982
- Vello Lõugas, Jüri Selirand. Arheoloogiga Eestimaa teedel. 1977, 2nd edition 1989
- The archaeology of terror. 1991
- Kaali kraatriväljal Phaethonit otsimas. 1996
- Lõugas, V. 1970. Eesti varane metalliaeg. Candidate's dissertation. Tallinn.
- Lõugas, V. 1972. Article on cup-marked stones in Estonia.
