= Rannaküla, Lääne County =

Village in Estonia

Coordinates: 59°14′35″N 23°39′27″E

Rannaküla
- Village
- Interactive map of Rannaküla
- Country: Estonia
- County: Lääne County
- Parish: Lääne-Nigula Parish
- Time zone: UTC+2 (EET)
  - Summer (DST): UTC+3 (EEST)

Rannaküla is a village in Lääne-Nigula Parish, Lääne County, in western Estonia.
