= Estonia in the Eurovision Song Contest 2004 =

- Eurovision Song Contest 2004
- Participating broadcaster: Eesti Televisioon (ETV)
- Country: Estonia
- Selection process: Eurolaul 2004
- Selection date: 7 February 2004

Competing entry
- Song: "Tii"
- Artist: Neiokõsõ
- Songwriters: Priit Pajusaar; Glen Pilvre; Aapo Ilves

Placement
- Semi-final result: Failed to qualify (11th)

Participation chronology

Estonia was represented at the Eurovision Song Contest 2004 with the song "Tii", composed by Priit Pajusaar and Glen Pilvre, with lyrics by Aapo Ilves, and performed by the group Neiokõsõ. The Estonian participating broadcaster, Eesti Televisioon (ETV), organised the national final Eurolaul 2004 in order to select its entry for the contest. Ten songs competed in the national final and "Tii" performed by Neiokõsõ was selected as the winner entirely by a public vote. This was the first-ever entry performed in Võro in the contest.

Estonia competed in the semi-final of the Eurovision Song Contest which took place on 12 May 2004. Performing during the show in position 17, "Tii" was not announced among the top 10 entries of the semi-final and therefore did not qualify to compete in the final. It was later revealed that Estonia placed eleventh out of the 22 participating countries in the semi-final with 57 points.

== Background ==
Prior to the 2004 Contest, Eesti Televisioon (ETV) had participated in the Eurovision Song Contest representing Estonia nine times since its first entry in 1994, winning the contest on one occasion: in 2001 with the song "Everybody" performed by Tanel Padar, Dave Benton and 2XL. In 2003, the song "Eighties Coming Back" performed by Ruffus placed twenty-first in the final.

As part of its duties as participating broadcaster, ETV organises the selection of its entry in the Eurovision Song Contest and broadcasts the event in the country. Since their debut, the broadcaster has organised national finals that feature a competition among multiple artists and songs in order to select its entry for the contest. ETV has organised Eurolaul competition since 1996, and on 1 October 2003, the broadcaster announced the organisation of Eurolaul 2004 in order to select its 2004 entry.

== Before Eurovision ==
=== Eurolaul 2004 ===
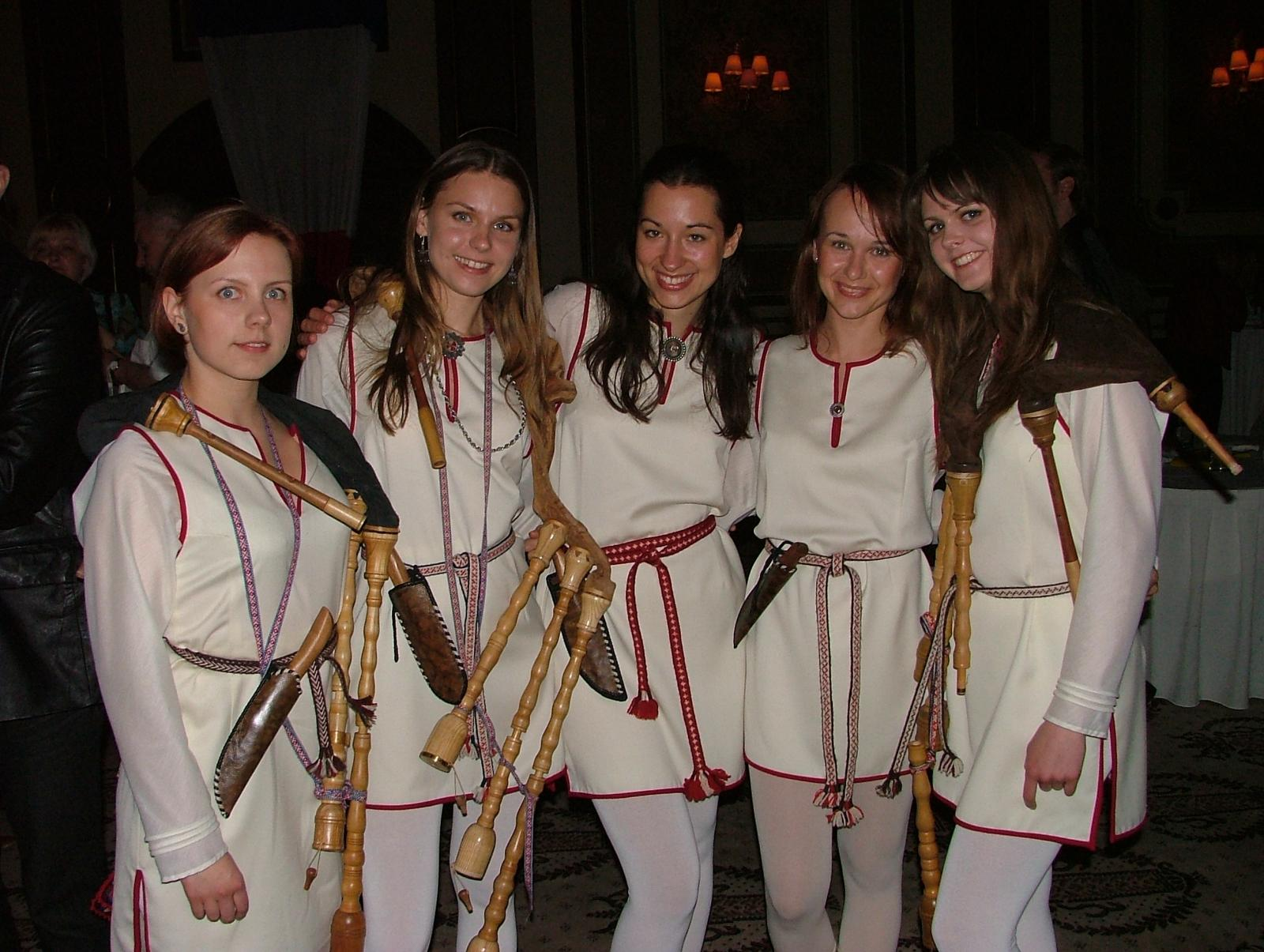
Neiokõsõ was selected to represent Estonia in the Eurovision Song Contest 2004 following their victory at Eurolaul 2004

Eurolaul 2004 was the eleventh edition of the Estonian national selection Eurolaul, organised by ETV to select its entry for the Eurovision Song Contest 2004. The competition consisted of a ten-song final on 7 February 2004 at the ETV studios in Tallinn, hosted by Marko Reikop and Karmel Eikner and broadcast on ETV. The national final was watched by 384,300 viewers in Estonia with a market share of 58.6%, making it the most watched Eurolaul competition since 1996.

==== Competing entries ====
On 1 October 2003, ETV opened the submission period for artists and composers to submit their entries up until 8 December 2003. A record 153 submissions were received by the deadline—breaking the previous record of 100, set during the 2003 edition. A 10-member jury panel selected 10 finalists from the submissions and the selected songs were announced on 11 December 2003 and among the competing artists were previous Eurovision Song Contest entrants Maarja (who represented Estonia in 1996 and in 1997), and Tanel Padar –performing with Slobodan River– (who represented Estonia in 2001 together with Dave Benton and 2XL). The selection jury consisted of Jaak Joala (musician), Meelis Kapstas (journalist), Jaan Karp (musician), Priit Hõbemägi (culture critic), Tõnu Kõrvits (composer), Kaari Sillamaa (composer), Heidi Pruuli (producer), Andres Jõesaar (media director), Tiit Kikas (musician) and Jaan Elgula (musician).

==== Final ====
The final took place on 7 February 2004. Ten songs competed during the show and "Tii" performed by Neiokõsõ was selected as the winner entirely by a public televote, revealed by Estonia's four regions alongside votes submitted via mobile phones. Despite the public televote having registered 60,387 votes, only 19,478 votes were ultimately counted towards the final result due to the remaining votes being submitted outside the official five-minute voting period. Elion, the telecommunications company responsible for the voting, stated that the extra votes given would not have changed anything in the final ranking of the songs.

Final – 7 February 2004
R/O	Artist	Song	Songwriter(s)	Televote	Place
1	Slobodan River	"Surrounded"	Maria Rahula, Tomi Rahula	2,080	3
2	Ewert Sundja	"Dance"	Vaiko Eplik	640	7
3	Zone and Cardinals	"Turn the Tide"	Priit Pajusaar, Glen Pilvre, Maian Kärmas	581	8
4	Charlene	"Whatever You Say"	Pearu Paulus, Ilmar Laisaar, Alar Kotkas, Jana Hallas	785	6
5	Airi Ojamets	"I Wanna Stay"	Raid Liiver	393	9
6	Hatuna and Sofia Rubina	"Whenever Blue"	Fred Krieger	188	10
7	Maarja	"Homme"	Maarja-Liis Ilus	1,320	4
8	Neiokõsõ	"Tii"	Priit Pajusaar, Glen Pilvre, Aapo Ilves	8,696	1
9	Kerli Kõiv	"Beautiful Inside"	Kerli Kõiv, Timo Vendt, Lauri Laubre	3,638	2
10	Charizma	"I'll Give You a Mountain"	Henrik Sethsson, Stig Lindell	1,157	5

Detailed Televoting Results
R/O	Song	Televoting Regions				Mobiles	Total
R/O	Song	Western Estonia	Eastern Estonia	Southern Estonia	Northern Estonia	Mobiles	Total
1	"Surrounded"	261	191	282	722	624	2,080
2	"Dance"	75	26	73	300	166	640
3	"Turn the Tide"	60	34	121	227	139	581
4	"Whatever You Say"	122	62	127	305	169	785
5	"I Wanna Stay"	77	36	57	170	53	393
6	"Whenever Blue"	13	22	11	105	37	188
7	"Homme"	146	104	162	594	314	1,320
8	"Tii"	990	699	1,877	2,999	2,131	8,696
9	"Beautiful Inside"	342	266	606	1,444	980	3,638
10	"I'll Give You a Mountain"	121	117	180	495	244	1,157

== At Eurovision ==
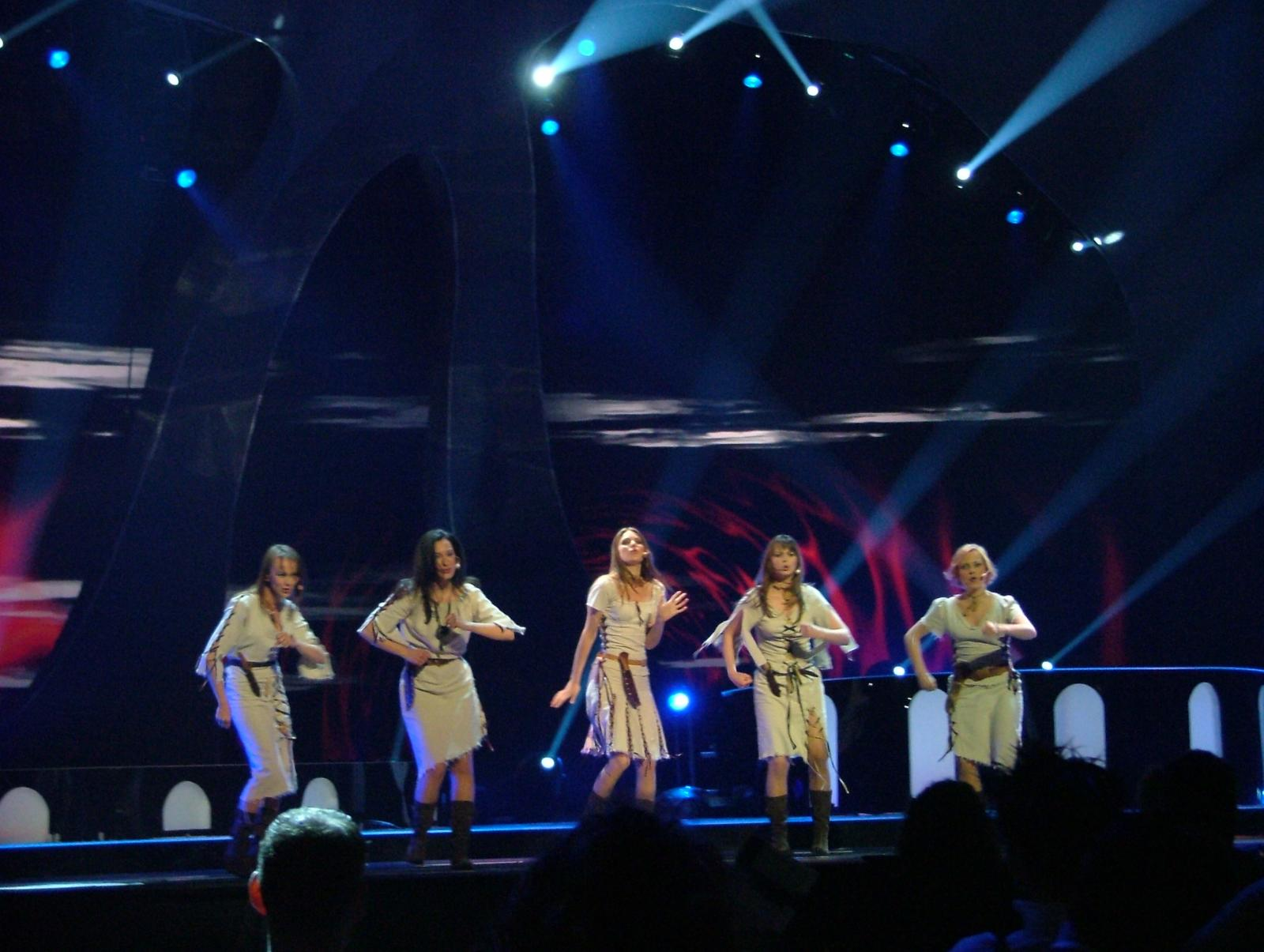
Neiokõsõ during a rehearsal before the semi-final

It was announced that the competition's format would be expanded to include a semi-final in 2004. According to the rules, all nations with the exceptions of the host country, the "Big Four" (France, Germany, Spain and the United Kingdom) and the ten highest placed finishers in the 2003 contest are required to qualify from the semi-final on 12 May 2004 in order to compete for the final on 15 May 2004; the top ten countries from the semi-final progress to the final. On 23 March 2004, a special allocation draw was held which determined the running order for the semi-final and Estonia was set to perform in position 17, following the entry from Slovenia and before the entry from Croatia. At the end of the semi-final, Estonia was not announced among the top 10 entries in the semi-final and therefore failed to qualify to compete in the final. It was later revealed that Estonia placed 11th in the semi-final, receiving a total of 57 points.

The semi-final and the final were broadcast in Estonia on ETV with commentary by Marko Reikop. ETV appointed Maarja-Liis Ilus (who represented Estonia in 1996 and in 1997) as its spokesperson to announce the Estonian votes during the final.

=== Voting ===
Below is a breakdown of points awarded to Estonia and awarded by Estonia in the semi-final and grand final of the contest. The nation awarded its 12 points to Ukraine in the semi-final and the final of the contest.

Following the release of the televoting figures by the EBU after the conclusion of the competition, it was revealed that a total of 57,179 televotes were cast in Estonia during the two shows: 22,564 votes during the semi-final and 34,615 votes during the final.

==== Points awarded to Estonia ====
Points awarded to Estonia (Semi-final)
Score	Country
12 points	Finland; Latvia
10 points	Lithuania
8 points	
7 points	Iceland
6 points	
5 points	Portugal
4 points	Serbia and Montenegro
3 points	Ukraine
2 points	
1 point	Albania; Norway; Sweden; United Kingdom

==== Points awarded by Estonia ====
Points awarded by Estonia (Semi-final)
Score	Country
12 points	Ukraine
10 points	Malta
8 points	Netherlands
7 points	Finland
6 points	Cyprus
5 points	Latvia
4 points	Greece
3 points	Denmark
2 points	Belarus
1 point	Albania

Points awarded by Estonia (Final)
Score	Country
12 points	Ukraine
10 points	Sweden
8 points	Russia
7 points	Cyprus
6 points	Malta
5 points	Greece
4 points	United Kingdom
3 points	Netherlands
2 points	Germany
1 point	Serbia and Montenegro
