= Kaks takti ette =

Estonian television show

Kaks takti ette was an Estonian television programme, where young vocalists competed against each other. The programme aired from 1972–2007. The programme was broadcast on Eesti Televisioon.

== Notable participants ==
Notable Kaks takti ette participants include:

- Silvi Vrait
- Anne Veski
- Marju Länik
- Siiri Sisask
- Pearu Paulus
- Hedvig Hanson
- Maian Kärmas
- Gerli Padar
- Tanel Padar
- Ewert Sundja
- Laura

== Winners ==
- ...
- 1992/1993 Hedvig Hanson
- 1994/1995 Tiiu Tulp
- 1997 Gerli Padar
- ...
