= Pearu Paulus =

Estonian singer

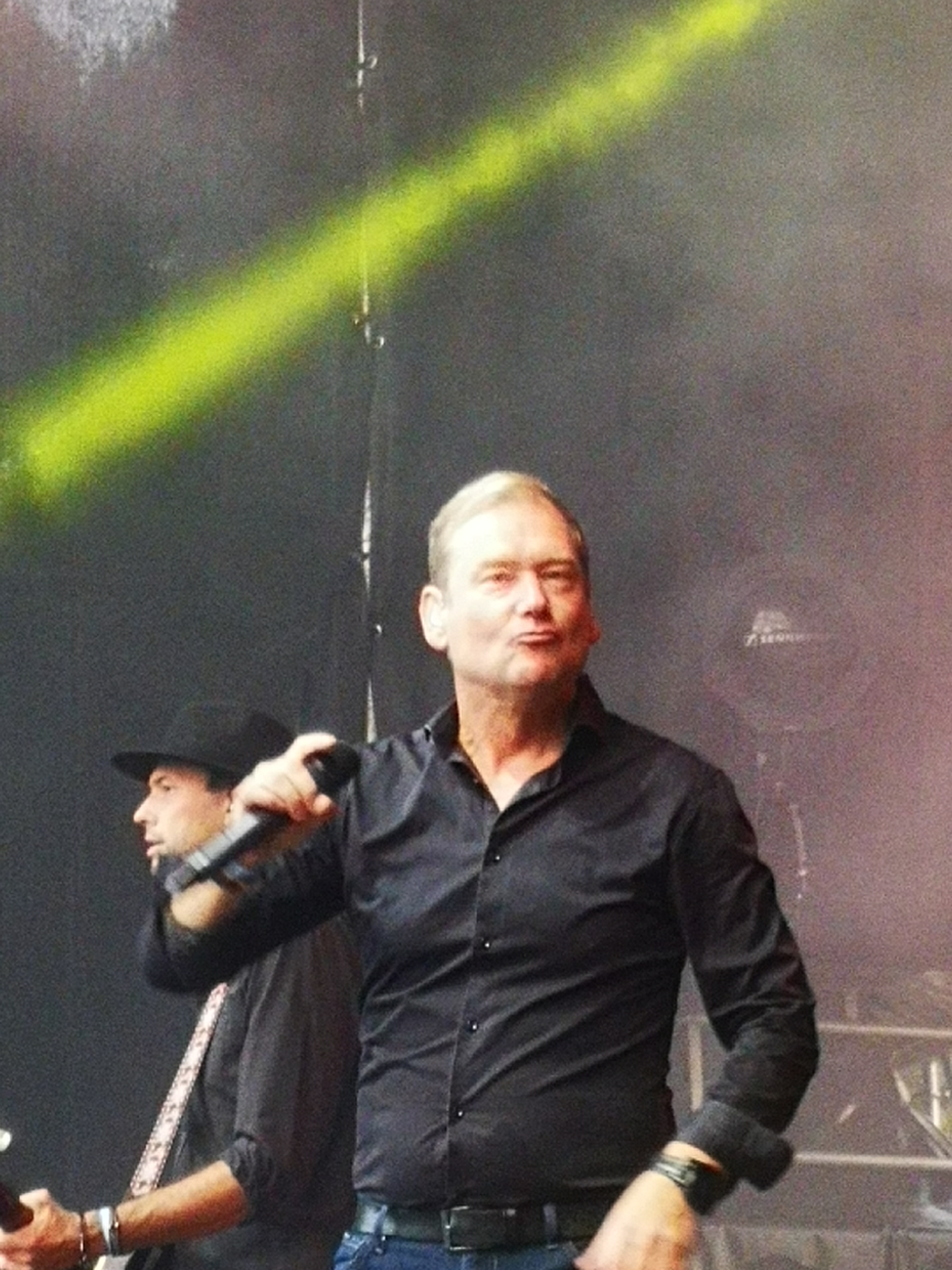
Paulus Pearu in 2021

Pearu Paulus ([ˈpe̯ɑru ˈpɑ̯uːːlus], born 3 November 1967) is an Estonian pop singer and songwriter. He is lead singer in the band 2 Quick Start.

Along with fellow 2 Quick Start members Ilmar Laisaar and Alar Kotkas, Paulus was the composer of the songs that represented Estonia in the Eurovision Song Contest in 2000 ("Once in a Lifetime", 4th at Eurovision), 2002 ("Runaway", 3rd at Eurovision), and 2006 ("Through My Window").

His musical career began with participating in the Estonian Television singing competition "Kaks takti ette". Before his Eurovision successes as a songwriter, he participated in the Estonian preselection Eurolaul multiple times from 1994 to 1999 as a solo singer, part of a duet, or with 2 Quick Start.

== Discography ==
With 2 Quick Start:

- "Olen loobuda sust proovinud" (1995)
- "Poolel teel su juurde" (1997)
- "Teine pool, The Very Best of Vol. 1" (1999)
- "Ühega miljoneist" (2001)
- "2010" (2010)
