= Ruffus =

Estonian indie rock band

- Origin: Estonia
- Genres: Indie rock, pop rock
- Years active: 1997–2003
- Members: Vaiko Eplik; Jaan Pehk; Ivo Etti; Margus Tohver; Siim Mäesalu

Ruffus was an indie rock band from Estonia that was originally known as Claire's Birthday. They represented their country in the Eurovision Song Contest 2003.

== Members ==
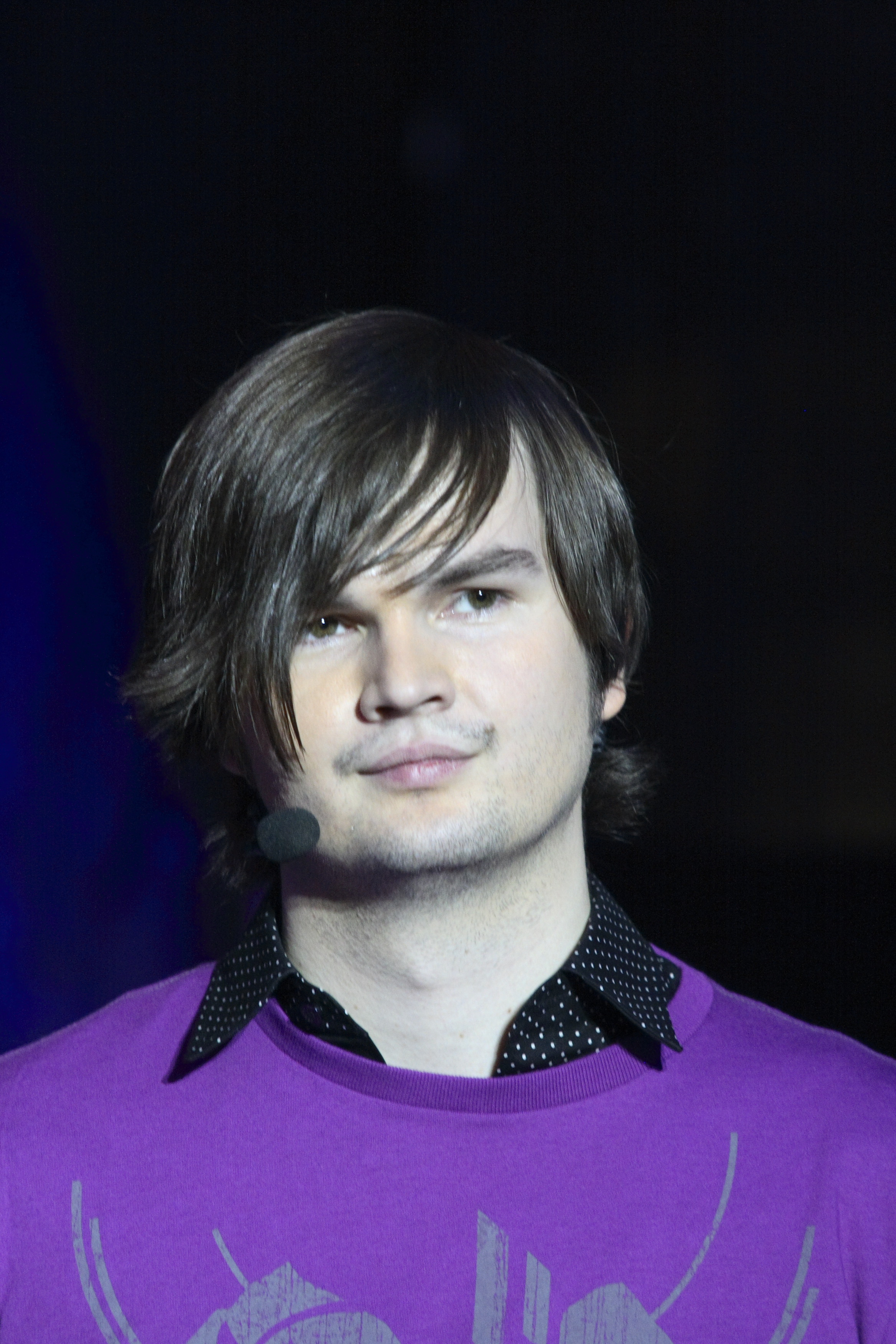
Vaiko Eplik (2007)

- Vaiko Eplik (vocals) was born in 1981 in Rapla, into a music-loving family (as most of the band) of collective farm workers. Eplik studied music at the Tallinn Music School, specialising in pop-jazz singing and also studied the guitar, which he now teaches.
- Jaan Pehk (guitar) was born in 1975 in Palivere. He has a degree in environmental protection. He studied pop-jazz singing at the Tallinn Music School and is now an active poet in the literary group Tartu Young Poets' Club (NAK).
- Ivo Etti (bass) was born in 1979 in Väike-Maarja. He studied at the Children's Music School in Rakvere and graduated from the Tallinn Music School, where he specialised in playing the clarinet. He is also the brother of former Estonian Eurovision representative, Ines.
- Margus Tohver (drums) was born in 1971 in Tallinn. During the 1980s he played in the first Estonian thrash metal band Palat.
- Siim Mäesalu (keyboards) was born in Kohila in 1984. While he has been a keen music student, he has also studied other subjects. He graduated from the Tallinn Secondary School of Music and is currently studying electronic music at the Estonian Academy of Music and Theatre.

== History ==
Vaiko Eplik formed the band Claire’s Birthday in 1997. It became a national pop sensation, releasing three albums and winning Estonian Music awards. As a joke in 2003, the band entered the Estonian selection of Eurovision Song Contest and won it with the song "Eighties Coming Back".

Awards and achievements
Preceded by Sahlene with "Runaway"	Estonia in the Eurovision Song Contest; 2003	Succeeded by Neiokõsõ with "Tii"
