= Evelin Samuel =

Estonian actress and singer

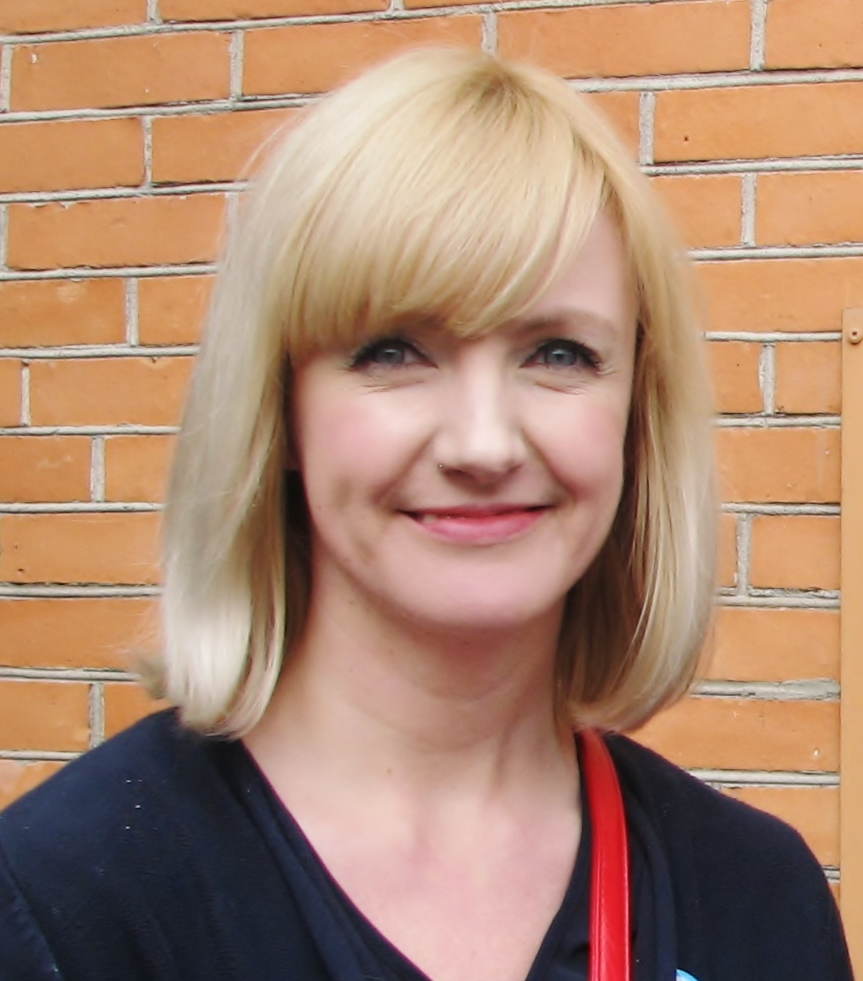
Evelin Samuel in 2015

Evelin Samuel (born 13 May 1975) is an Estonian singer, songwriter, musical theater performer, author of children's books and participant in the Eurovision Song Contest.

== Career ==
Evelin Samuel has been singing since childhood and was even recorded by the studios of Eesti Raadio at a very early age. In the late 1980s, Evelin joined the children's musical theatre Colombina whom she performed with at the 1992 Roskilde Festival in Denmark.

In 1993, she finished 4th at Kaks takti ette, a contest for debutant singers, organized by Eesti Televisioon. The same year, she won the Baltic song contest Via Baltica and a year later she won again with "Vari ja roos" at Uus Laul, a song contest organized by Eesti Televisioon.

In 1997 and 1999, Evelin Samuel took part in the Eurovision Song Contest while 2002 saw the release of her debut album Alternature: Over The Water Blue. In the late 1990s, she was also a DJ at the popular Raadio Uuno.

Evelin has also been singing dance music on ferries on the Baltic Sea for several years.

In 2015, Samuel ran for the general parliamentary elections for the political party Isamaa but was not elected.

== Writing ==
In 2008, Evelin Samuel introduced her debut book release, Ükskord, kui sadas vihma (Once When It Was Raining), a fantasy story for little children. Since then, she has written a number of songs, poems and short stories, all for children.

In 2010, Evelin Samuel became the editor-in-chief of the popular health magazine Tervis Pluss, a post she held for a year. She's also a columnist.

=== Eurovision Song Contest ===
Evelin Samuel attempted to enter the Eurovision Song Contest in 1994 (with three songs) and 1996 (with two songs) but did not succeed until 1997, when she took the stage as one of the backing vocalists for the Estonian entry, "Keelatud maa", performed by Maarja-Liis Ilus, which ended up in eighth place. She came back to Eurolaul, the estonian selection for the Eurovision Song Contest, in 1998 with two songs and finished as Runner up with "Unistus igavesest päevast", only three points behind the winner.

In the Eurovision Song Contest 1999 she represented Estonia with the song "Diamond of Night" alongside the violinist Camille, finishing in sixth place. The lyrics for the song were written by Maian-Anna Kärmas, who was a backing vocalist in the entry. This was the first ever time an entry that was not sung in Estonian had ever represented Estonia in the Eurovision Song Contest.

Evelin has tried to enter Eurovision in 2000, but she was not selected. However, in 2000 and 2006 Evelin was the spokesperson for the Estonian televote results at the Eurovision.

Samuel entered Eesti Laul 2022 with her song "Waterfall", which qualified from the first quarterfinal but was eliminated in the semi-final.

=== Musical Theatre ===
In 2001, Evelin Samuel was cast to play the role of Fantine in the musical Les Misérables in Tallinn but had to cancel her participation for personal reasons in the middle of the rehearsals. Still, a couple of years later, she earned good reviews for her portrayal of Nancy in Oliver! in Tallinn and went on to play in the musical Miss Saigon in Helsinki. She was also a member of the company of Jesus Christ Superstar in 1993.

== Personal life ==
In 2016, Samuel married pianist Johan Randvere. The couple have one daughter, Marta, born in 2019, and she has two sons, Oskar and Torsten from a previous relationship with a journalist Raimo Ülavere. Since 2019, she has been often credited as Evelin Samuel-Randvere.

Awards and achievements
Preceded by Koit Toome with "Mere lapsed"	Estonia in the Eurovision Song Contest (with Camille); 1999	Succeeded by Ines with "Once in a Lifetime"
