= Slobodan River =

Estonian musical group

Slobodan River was a pop-rock band from Estonia, featuring Ithaka Maria, Tomi Rahula and Stig Rästa. They were together for five years and broke up around 2006.
