= Anna Sahlene =

Swedish singer

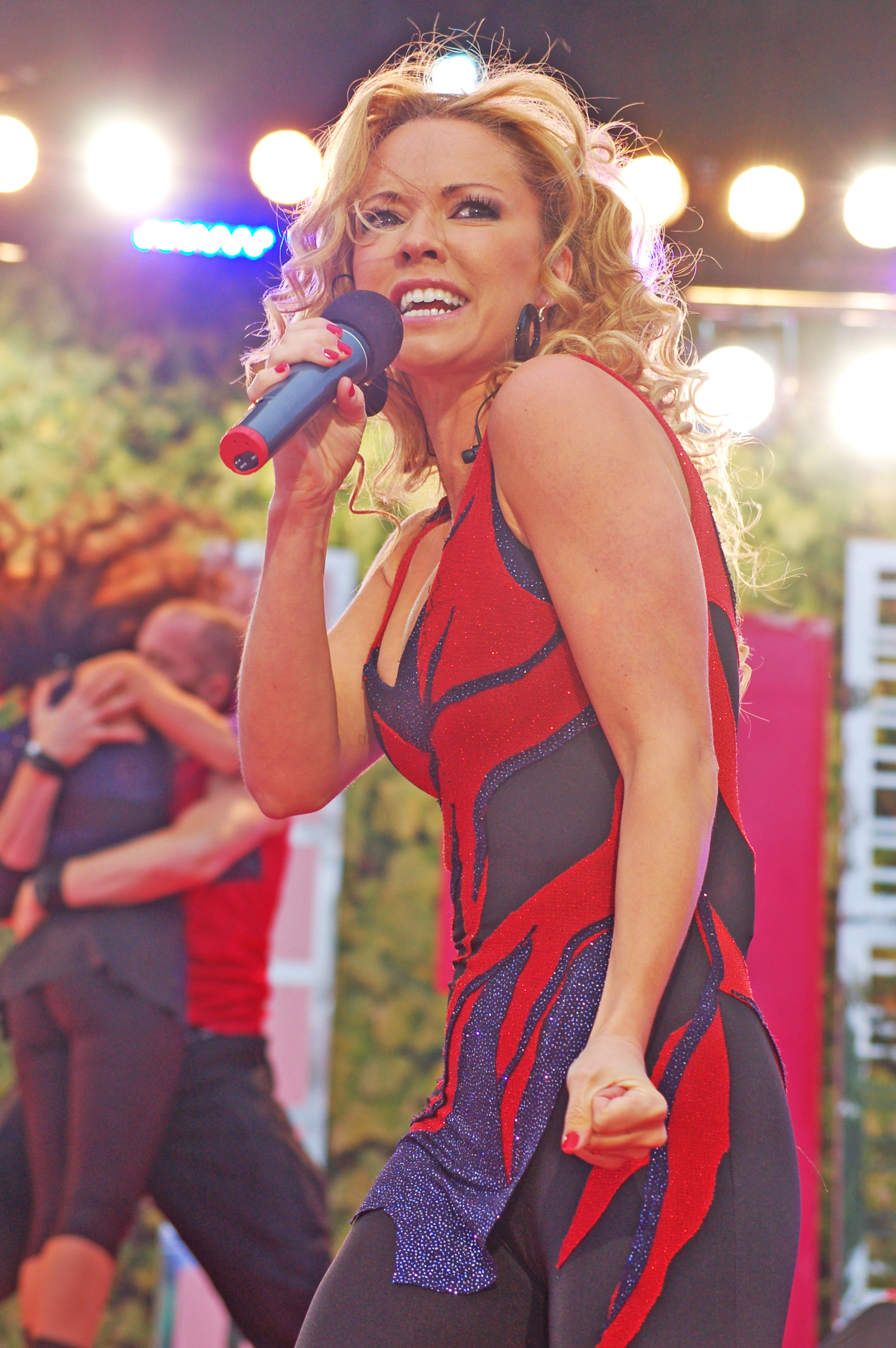

Background information
- Also known as: Sahlene, Anna Sahlene, Anna Sahlin
- Born: Anna Cecilia Sahlin; 11 May 1976 (age 49)
- Origin: Söderhamn, Sweden
- Genres: Pop
- Occupation: Singer
- Years active: 1999–present

Anna Cecilia Sahlin (born 11 May 1976), known professionally as Anna Sahlene and formerly by the one-word stage name Sahlene, is a Swedish singer best known for placing third at the Eurovision Song Contest 2002 representing Estonia with "Runaway".

== Early life/career ==
Born in Söderhamn on 11 May 1976, Sahlene was the oldest of seven children having three younger brothers and three younger sisters. Both her parents had strong musical inclinations which were passed on to their children, with Sahlene herself singing from an early age in addition to learning cello, guitar, oboe and piano. However her performing career began as an actress: at age nine she had a lead role in The Children of Noisy Village (1986), based on a story by Astrid Lindgren, and subsequently reprised her role - that of Anna - in the sequel More About the Children of Noisy Village (1987) appearing in both films billed as Anna Sahlin.

Sahlene did not pursue a performing career subsequent to these two films - although she appeared on television in 1989 when the two Noisy Village films were run as a seven part series - until the age of eighteen when she moved to Stockholm with aspirations to be a singer. She was for several years a member of One Voice a gospel choir directed by Gabriel Forss whose members also performed as background vocalists on recordings by such artists as Eric Gadd, Carola and Robyn.

She was among the members of One Voice who formed the chorale for the Charlotte Nilsson performance of "Take Me to Your Heaven" at Eurovision 1999 where, representing Sweden, the number won. At the subsequent Eurovision 2000, held in Stockholm, Sahlene was again onstage as one of the members of One Voice who formed the chorale for the Claudette Pace performance of the Maltese entrant "Desire". Sahlene's own recording career began in 1997 when she fronted the band Rhythm Avenue on their album Twelve Steps Down the Avenue.

== As Sahlene ==
=== The Little Voice ===
Sahlene's first solo single in 2000 was called "The Little Voice" ("The Little Voice" did not pick up much airplay until it was later covered and released as a single by Hilary Duff in 2004, though with almost entirely rewritten lyrics). Three videos were made for tracks recorded by Sahlene for Roadrunner Arcade Music: "Fifth Element"; "The Little Voice", landing in the top 5 of MTV Nordic's most played list; and "Fishies", filmed on location in Sardinia, Italy. "The Little Voice" and the 2001 single release "House" were both minor Swedish chart hits for Sahlene with respective peaks of #51 and #52. Sahlene recorded tracks for a The Little Voice album release which was shelved due to EMG's buyout of Roadrunner Arcade Music and its eventual fall into bankruptcy. However Sahlene was afforded the opportunity to serve as opening act at Swedish concerts by Robert Plant and Bon Jovi as part of the promotion for The Little Voice album prior to its release being canceled.

=== Eurovision 2002/ Runaway ===
Sahlene was subsequently signed to Virgin Records Sweden but had yet to record for that label when Virgin Sweden was contacted in January 2002 by Estonian pop group 2 Quick Start, who had entered their composition "Runaway" in Eurolaul 2002: top Estonian pop star Ines had recorded the demo of "Runaway" but opted out of performing the song in Eurolaul and 2 Quick Start, unable to solicit another Estonian singer, were now hoping to recruit a singer from Sweden. Virgin Records telephoned Sahlene with the offer to perform "Runaway" at Eurolaul 2002 the evening of the day the label was contacted by the songwriters and at 6 a.m. the following morning Sahlene flew to the Estonian capital of Tallinn where she rehearsed with 2 Quick Start over the two weeks remaining prior to Eurolaul 2002.

On 26 January 2002 Sahlene's performance of "Runaway" at Eurolaul 2002 resulted in a first-place finish, with "Runaway" resultantly becoming the Estonian entrant for Eurovision 2002 and on the night of competition for Eurovision 2002 - mounted 25 May 2002 at Saku Suurhall Arena in Tallinn - Sahlene's performance of "Runaway" resulted in a third-place finish.

"Runaway" debuted at #20 on the Swedish singles chart dated 12 June 2002 but failed to rise higher although it did spend 14 weeks in the Top 40 with seven of those weeks in the Top 25.

=== 2003 (Melodifestivalen/ debut album) - 2004 ===
In 2003 Sahlene made her first bid to represent her native Sweden at Eurovision participating in Melodifestivalen, the Swedish national preselection round for Eurovision, with the number "We're Unbreakable" which on 8 March 2003 bowed out of Melodifestivalen 2003 with a fifth-place finish in Round #1 of Semi-Final #4. Sahlene had freely admitted prior to Melodifestivalen 2003 that the intent of her Melodifestivalen participation was to showcase "We're Unbreakable" only to the point of securing a hit in Sweden and Estonia: she was sure "We're Unbreakable" would not be voted by the Swedish public as their Eurovision entrant and Sahlene in fact preferred not to compete on the Eurovision main stage for a second consecutive year.

"We're Unbreakable" was included on Sahlene's debut album It's Been a While which mostly consisted of tracks from her unreleased Little Voice album and also contained "Runaway": It's Been a While was released on M&L Records - a Lionheart Music Group label - in April 2003 and "Unbreakable" became a hit on Swedish radio although it was not released as a physical single and therefore did not chart.

Sahlene's name was leaked as a possible performer for the Melodifestivalen 2004 entrant "Baby I Can't Stop": however the eventual performer of the song was Gladys del Pilar.

Sahlene was a guest performer on the album What a Wonderful World by the Joybells, singing the title track for that summer 2004 release.

== As Anna Sahlene ==
=== 2005 ===
In February 2005 Sahlene's second album Photograph was released on M&L's parent label Lionheart with artist credit reading Anna Sahlene: the addition of the first name "Anna" to Sahlene's professional name was first evident on this album's advance single "Creeps" - released in January 2005 to become a hit in both Sweden (#28) and Finland (#13) - and the subject of this article has been credited as "Anna Sahlene" in all her subsequent professional endeavors, including voicing the character of "Cappy" in the Swedish-language dubbed version of the animated film Robots (released by 20th Century Fox March 2005).

=== 2006 (Melodifestivalen) - 2007 ===
In 2006 Anna Sahlene again vied to represent Sweden at Eurovision participating in Melodifestivalen 2006 with the song "This Woman" which Sahlene composed with Bobby Ljunggren and Henrik Wikström: "This Woman" bowed out of Melodifestivalen 2006 in the first semi-final having finished that round in fifth place and thus just missing the cut-off for advancement. However Sahlene's recording of "This Woman" - released on M&L - did return her to the Swedish Top 20 for the first time since "Runaway" with "This Woman" peaking at #19 in March 2006 although the eight-week chart tenure of "This Woman" was far briefer than that of the #20 hit "Runaway".

Sahlene was one of the contestants on the 2007 season of the Swedish TV show Let's Dance on TV4. Sahlene was voted off the show, which was won by Lasse Brandeby.

On 11 August 2007 Sahlene began an extended run in the female lead Ariel Moore in the musical Footloose in Gothenburg: the show moved to Stockholm on 20 February 2008.

=== 2008 - 09 (Melodifestivalen) ===
In January 2008 it was announced that Sahlene would possibly participate in that year's Selecția Națională: the national preselection round for Romania in Eurovision: although the demo of the number "Dr Frankenstein" had only featured vocalist LaGaylia Frazier it was tentatively planned that the number would be performed in Selecția Națională as a duet by Frazier and Sahlene with the duo being billed as LaSal. However, by the month's end it was confirmed that Sahlene's schedule would not permit her to participate in Selecția Națională ("Dr Frankenstein" as performed by LaGaylia Frazier at the Selecția Națională final of 23 February 2008 finished in tenth place). Sahlene was a guest performer at Eurolaul 2008 broadcast live from the Eesti Televisioon Studio in Tallinn on 2 February 2008 previewing her upcoming single release, a cover version of Maria Arredondo's #4 2007 Norwegian hit "Brief and Beautiful".

Sahlene again bid to represent Sweden at Sweden at Eurovision 2009, competing in Melodifestivalen 2009 with "Killing Me Tenderly" a duet with Maria Haukaas Storeng: conceived as a solo, the song's composers had recast "Killing Me Tenderly" as a duet upon finding the demo submitted by Sahlene and that submitted by Storeng equally impressive. "Killing Me Tenderly" bowed out of Melodifestivalen 2009 in Semi-Final #4 - held 28 February 2009 - in seventh place: however the recording of "Killing Me Tenderly" by Anna Sahlene and Maria Haukaas Storeng - released on M&L - rose as high on the Swedish charts as #10 (though with a very brief overall chart tenure of three weeks).

On 24 October 2010 Sahlene performed at a "Eurovision Night After Dark" party held at the Swedish embassy in Washington D.C.

=== Recent career ===
In 2010 Sahlene was one of several artists featured "Ta Min Hand" a charity single in support of SOS Children's Villages; Sahlene was also among the personnel of "Ta Min Hand" who performed at an accompanying fundraising concert held at Kungsträdgården on 20 November 2010 - the day of the single's release.

From autumn 2010, Anna Sahlene and LaGaylia Frazier extensively toured Sweden with an R&B-oriented live show entitled the Blues Mothers.

2012 saw the first release of any new recordings by Sahlene in four years, with the single "Jamie" released on 27 February and the follow-up "Horns of Mississippi" released on 6 July 2012: these two singles are included on the eleven-track album Roses released on 26 September 2012.

It was announced that as of 27 December 2012 Sahlene will perform in the role of Maria Magdalena in the Göta Lejon Theatre production of Jesus Christ Superstar.

In 2013 Sahlene voiced the character of Queen Tara in the Swedish-language dubbed version of the animated film Epic released by 20th Century Fox in May 2013.

It was announced on 5 May 2016 that Sahlene and Dea Norberg will be the backing vocalists for Dami Im when she performs the 2016 Australian entry for Eurovision: "Sound of Silence", which Im is scheduled to perform in the second semi-final on 11 May 2016 at the Globen: a Top Ten place in the semi-final will entitle Im to perform "Sound of Silence" in the Eurovision 2016 Grand Final held at the Globen on the night of 14 May 2016. At the 5 May 2016 rehearsals for Im's semi-final performance Sahlene and Norberg performed their background vocals offstage.

In autumn 2018 she played the role Grace Farrell in Nöjesteaterns production of the stage musical Annie. She reprised her role in the spring of 2019 in Lorensbergsteatern in Göteborg.

In May 2019, she provided backing vocals at Eurovision 2019 for the United Kingdom's entry “Bigger Than Us” by Michael Rice.

She finished in 4th place in Eesti Laul 2022 with the song "Champion" and in 11th place in Eesti Laul 2025 with the song "Love Me Low".

In 2023, she participated in the Netflix series Squid Game: The Challenge as Player 142.

== Albums ==
=== Studio albums ===
Title	Details
It's Been a While	Released: 2003; Label: M&L Records (MLCD003); Formats: CD
Photograph	Released: 2005; Label: Lionheart Records (LHICD0020); Formats: CD
Roses	Released: 2012; Label: Lionheart Records (LHICD0144); Formats: CD, digital

=== Charted singles ===
Title	Year	Peak chart positions	Album
Title	Year	SWE	Album
"The Little Voice" (as Sahlene)	2000	51	It's Been a While
"House" (as Sahlene)	2001	52	It's Been a While
"Runaway" (as Sahlene)	2002	20	It's Been a While
"Creeps"	2005	28	Photograph
"This Woman"	2006	19	
"Killing Me Tenderly" (with Maria Haukaas Storeng)	2009	10	

Awards and achievements
Preceded by Tanel Padar, Dave Benton & 2XL with "Everybody"	Estonia in the Eurovision Song Contest; 2002	Succeeded by Ruffus with "Eighties Coming Back"
