= Eda-Ines Etti =

Estonian singer

Ines
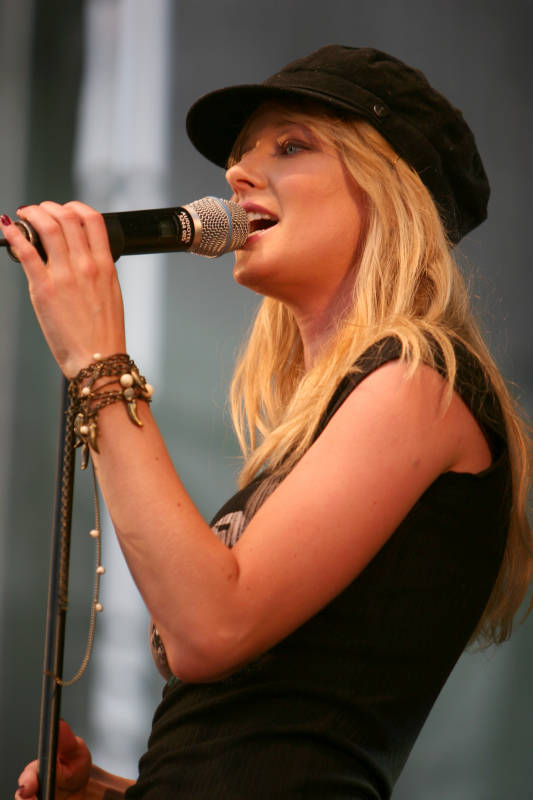
- Eda-Ines Etti in Ultra Go Live 2006, Tallinn

Background information
- Born: Eda-Ines Etti; Haapsalu, then part of Estonian SSR, Soviet Union
- Genres: Traditional pop
- Years active: 2000–present
- Label: Bulldozer

Eda-Ines Etti ([ˈɛdɑ ˈinɛs ˈɛtːi]), also known as simply Ines, is an Estonian singer and songwriter. Etti represented Estonia in the Eurovision Song Contest 2000 with the song "Once in a Lifetime", placing fourth. Until their win the following year, this was Estonia's best result in the competition.

== Career ==
Ines was designed to be once again Estonia's public face at the Eurovision Song Contest 2002 held in Estonia, as she was the first choice for the production team of the Eurolaul entry "Runaway". However, she pulled out at the last moment, and an experienced Swedish singer, Sahlene was hurriedly drafted in to perform "Runaway" at Eurolaul. This caused some controversy, with Ines' role in the affair coming under question. In the same year, Ines became the face for the Finnish mobile ticketing company Plusdial.

Since then, she has once been the national spokeswoman during the voting procedure of Eurovision Song Contest and a co-presenter of Eurolaul in 2005.

Ines's first album in Estonian, 15 magamata ööd, was issued in 2004. The title-track of the record brought her the second "Female Artist of the Year" at the Estonian Music Awards. Ines' backup band was formed in 2005, including her brother Ivo Etti (bass guitar), Siim Mäesalu (piano), Erki Pärnoja (lead guitar), and Magnus Pajupuu (drums). The first two instrumentalists were freshly recruited from Ruffus, the participants of Eurovision Song Contest 2003.

The first record of the new formation was Ines' album Uus päev. This included Ines' second Eurolaul entry, the song "Iseendale". The song came a close second to the winner "Through My Window", performed by the Swedish Sandra Oxenryd. "Iseendale" was notable as the only Estonian language song entered in 2006. Ines' third Eurolaul entry was the song entitled "In Good and Bad" in 2007 and achieved the 7th place.

Her album Kustutame vead earned her the nomination for the Female Artist of the Year. In 2008, Eda-Ines Etti won the Estonian version of the Just the Two of Us reality television singing contest in duet with the chief general manager of IBM Estonia Valdo Randpere.

Ines released her fifth studio album Kas kuuled mind in the end of November 2009. The album includes the singles "Ükskord", "Ja sina", "Öine linn", and "Äratatud hing".

Her sixth album "Kiusatus" released in May 2011 and included a hit track "Tule-tule" which also has a video. This album came on sale with the cooperation of A Le Coq and was only possible to purchase with A Le Coq beer six pack.

== Discography ==
=== Singles ===
- "Illusion of Happiness" - 2000
- "Once in a Lifetime" - 2000
- "Highway to Nowhere" - 2002
- "15 magamata ööd" - 2004
- "Kallis, kas sa tead" - 2004
- "Väike saatan" - 2004
- "Aarete saar" - 2005
- "Suvi on veel ees" - 2005
- "Must ja valge" - 2005
- "Ma ei tea, mis juhtuks" - 2005
- "Iseendale" - 2006
- "Lendan" - June 2006
- "In Good and Bad" - January 2007
- "Kustutame vead" - 2007
- "Keerlen" - 2008
- "Lõpuni välja" - 2008
- "Kus kulgeb kuu" - 2008
- "Ja sina" - 2009
- "Öine linn" - 2009
- "Ükskord" - 2009
- "Äratatud hing" - 2010
- "Tule-tule" - 2011
- "Pilvepiir" - 2011
- "Põlen sinu ees" - 2014

=== Albums ===
- Here For Your Love - 2000
- 15 magamata ööd - November 2004
- Uus päev - December 2005
- Kustutame vead - December 2007
- Kas kuuled mind - November 2009
- Kiusatus - May 2011

== Awards and nominations ==
Year	Award	Category	Title	Result
1999	Kaks takti ette (Contest of young singers by the Eesti Televisioon)			2nd place
2000	Eurovision Song Contest		"Once in a Lifetime"	4th place
2000	Estonian Music Awards	Female Artist of the Year	Here for Your Love	Won
2005	Estonian Music Awards	Female Artist of the Year	15 magamata ööd	Won
2005	Estonian Music Awards	Record of the Year	15 magamata ööd	Won
2006	Eurolaul (Estonian national selection for Eurovision Song Contest)		"Iseendale"	2nd place
2006	Estonian Music Awards	Female Artist of the Year	Uus päev	Nominated
2008	Estonian Music Awards	Female Artist of the Year	Kustutame vead	Nominated
2008	Laulud tähtedega (Estonian version of Just the Two of Us)			Won

Awards and achievements
Preceded by Evelin Samuel and Camille with "Diamond of Night"	Estonia in the Eurovision Song Contest; 2000	Succeeded by Tanel Padar, Dave Benton and 2XL with "Everybody"
