= Estonia in the Eurovision Song Contest =

- Eurovision Song Contest
- Participating broadcaster: Eesti Rahvusringhääling (ERR; 2008–present) Formerly: Eesti Televisioon (ETV; 1993–2007)

Participation summary
- Appearances: 31 (20 finals)
- First appearance: 1994
- Highest placement: 1st: 2001
- Host: 2002
- Participation history: ~~1993~~; 1994; 1995; 1996; 1997; 1998; 1999; 2000; 2001; 2002; 2003; 2004; 2005; 2006; 2007; 2008; 2009; 2010; 2011; 2012; 2013; 2014; 2015; 2016; 2017; 2018; 2019; ~~2020~~; 2021; 2022; 2023; 2024; 2025; 2026; 2027

Related articles
- Eesti Laul

External links
- ERR page
- Estonia's page at Eurovision.com
- For the most recent participation see Estonia in the Eurovision Song Contest 2026

Estonia has been represented at the Eurovision Song Contest 31 times since making its debut in 1994. Its first appearance would have taken place in 1993 but a qualification round was installed for seven former Eastern Bloc countries hoping to make their debut in the contest, with Estonia failing to qualify. Estonia has won the contest once, in 2001. The current Estonian participating broadcaster in the contest is Eesti Rahvusringhääling (ERR).

Estonia's first participation in 1994 was unsuccessful, finishing 24th (out of 25). Estonia went on to finish in the top eight in six out of seven contests (1996–2002), with "Kaelakee hääl" by Maarja-Liis Ilus and Ivo Linna fifth (1996), Maarja-Liis Ilus returning to finish eighth with "Keelatud maa" (1997), "Diamond of Night" by Evelin Samuel and Camille sixth (1999), and "Once in a Lifetime" by Ines fourth (2000), before "Everybody" by Tanel Padar, Dave Benton, and 2XL gave Estonia its first victory in 2001. With this, Estonia became the first of the new countries that joined Eurovision in the 1990s to win the contest. "Runaway" by Sahlene then finished third for the hosts in Tallinn in 2002.

Since the introduction of the semi-final round in 2004, Estonia has failed to reach the final on ten occasions and has reached the top ten six times, more than any other Baltic country. These top ten finishes are "Rändajad" by Urban Symphony sixth (2009), "Kuula" by Ott Lepland sixth (2012), "Goodbye to Yesterday" by Elina Born and Stig Rästa seventh (2015), "La forza" by Elina Nechayeva eighth (2018), "Bridges" by Alika eighth (2023), and "Espresso Macchiato" by Tommy Cash third (2025).

== Participation ==
Eesti Televisioon (ETV) was a full member of the European Broadcasting Union (EBU) from 1st January 1993, thus eligible to participate in the Eurovision Song Contest from then. It participated in the contest representing Estonia from the 39th edition in 1994. Since 2008, after a restructuring that led to the incorporation of ETV into the current Eesti Rahvusringhääling (ERR) organisation, it has been the latter who participates representing Estonia.

== History ==
Estonia finished 24th (out of 25) on its debut in 1994 and was relegated from the following year's contest. Estonia's record at the contest was a successful one from 1996 to 2002, only failing once to make the top 10 (in 1998 when it ended up in 12th place). Maarja-Liis Ilus and Ivo Linna's fifth-place in 1996 was the first top five ranking for any country, formerly annexed by Soviet Union and therefore unable to participate. Ilus returned to finish eighth in 1997.

The country's first win came in 2001, when Tanel Padar and Dave Benton, along with 2XL, sang "Everybody" and received 198 points, therefore making Estonia the first formerly USSR-annexed country to win the Contest. The 2002 contest was held in Estonia, in the capital city Tallinn, where Sahlene finished third for the hosts (tied with the UK).

From 2004 to 2008 Estonia failed to qualify to the finals, mostly receiving poor results – during that period its best entry was 11th place in the 2004 semi-final by Neiokõsõ with "Tii", sung in the Võro language.

Despite news that Estonia might withdraw from the 2009 contest (set to be held in Moscow, Russia) due to the war in South Ossetia, Eesti Rahvusringhääling (ERR) confirmed that due to public demand, Estonia would send an entry to Moscow. The new national final, Eesti Laul, was introduced to select the Estonian entry. According to Mart Normet, one of the producers and one of the Heads of Delegation, the new contest focuses on promoting Estonian music and creativity, encouraging artistic freedom and originality while avoiding formulaic Eurovision songs. Normet described it as a way to highlight authentic Estonian pop music for local audiences, trusting the taste of Estonian listeners rather than tailoring entries for foreign juries.

The winner was Urban Symphony with "Rändajad", which had beaten the televoting favourite, Laura, by the votes of a jury.

At the second semi-final of the 2009 contest, Urban Symphony qualified Estonia to the final of the contest for the first time since 2003, receiving 115 points and placing 3rd. The group performed 15th in the final, where it received 129 points, placing 6th out of 25 competing entries as well as being the highest placing non-English language song at the 2009 competition.

In 2010, Estonia failed to qualify to the final, with the song "Siren" by Malcolm Lincoln.

In 2011, Estonia was represented by Getter Jaani with the song "Rockefeller Street". She was the bookmakers' pre-contest favorite for victory along with France. She qualified to the final but eventually placed 24th of 25 entries- tying Silvi Vrait's 1994 result for Estonia's worst placing in the final.

Since 2012, Estonia has achieved five more top ten results. Ott Lepland qualified Estonia to the final of the 2012 contest, with his song "Kuula", ending up fourth in the second semi-final. In the final, he equalled Estonia's result of 1999 and 2009, placing sixth. Elina Born and Stig Rästa finished seventh in 2015. Elina Nechayeva and Alika finished eighth in 2018 and 2023, respectively. Tommy Cash placed third in 2025, giving Estonia its best placement since 2002. In 2026, Estonia failed to qualify for the final with Vanilla Ninja, who previously represented Switzerland in 2005, with the song "Too Epic to Be True".

== Participation overview ==
Table key
1	First place
3	Third place
◁	Last place
◇	Entry selected but did not compete

Year	Artist	Song	Language	Final	Points	Semi	Points
1993	Janika Sillamaa ◇	"Muretut meelt ja südametuld" ◇	Estonian ◇	Failed to qualify (Note: A qualifying round was held for new countries looking to make their debut at the 1993 contest. Estonia failed to progress from this round; entries which failed to progress have subsequently been discounted by the EBU and do not feature as part of the countries' list of appearances.)		5	47
1994	Silvi Vrait	"Nagu merelaine"	Estonian	24	2	No semi-finals	
1996	Maarja-Liis Ilus and Ivo Linna	"Kaelakee hääl"	Estonian	5	94	5	106
1997	Maarja	"Keelatud maa"	Estonian	8	82	No semi-finals	
1998	Koit Toome	"Mere lapsed"	Estonian	12	36	No semi-finals	
1999	Evelin Samuel and Camille	"Diamond of Night"	English	6	90	No semi-finals	
2000	Ines	"Once in a Lifetime"	English	4	98	No semi-finals	
2001	Tanel Padar, Dave Benton and 2XL	"Everybody"	English	1	198	No semi-finals	
2002	Sahlene	"Runaway"	English	3	111	No semi-finals	
2003	Ruffus	"Eighties Coming Back"	English	21	14	No semi-finals	
2004	Neiokõsõ	"Tii"	Võro	Failed to qualify		11	57
2005	Suntribe	"Let's Get Loud"	English	Failed to qualify		20	31
2006	Sandra	"Through My Window"	English	Failed to qualify		18	28
2007	Gerli Padar	"Partners in Crime"	English	Failed to qualify		22	33
2008	Kreisiraadio	"Leto svet"	Serbian, German, Finnish	Failed to qualify		18	8
2009	Urban Symphony	"Rändajad"	Estonian	6	129	3	115
2010	Malcolm Lincoln	"Siren"	English	Failed to qualify		14	39
2011	Getter Jaani	"Rockefeller Street"	English	24	44	9	60
2012	Ott Lepland	"Kuula"	Estonian	6	120	4	100
2013	Birgit	"Et uus saaks alguse"	Estonian	20	19	10	52
2014	Tanja	"Amazing"	English	Failed to qualify		12	36
2015	Elina Born and Stig Rästa	"Goodbye to Yesterday"	English	7	106	3	105
2016	Jüri Pootsmann	"Play"	English	Failed to qualify		18 ◁	24
2017	Koit Toome and Laura	"Verona"	English	Failed to qualify		14	85
2018	Elina Nechayeva	"La forza"	Italian	8	245	5	201
2019	Victor Crone	"Storm"	English	20	76	4	198
2020	Uku Suviste ◇	"What Love Is" ◇	English ◇	Contest cancelled (Note: The 2020 contest was cancelled due to the COVID-19 pandemic.)			
2021	Uku Suviste	"The Lucky One"	English	Failed to qualify		13	58
2022	Stefan	"Hope"	English	13	141	5	209
2023	Alika	"Bridges"	English	8	168	10	74
2024	5miinust and Puuluup	"(Nendest) narkootikumidest ei tea me (küll) midagi"	Estonian	20	37	6	79
2025	Tommy Cash	"Espresso Macchiato"	Italian, English	3	356	5	113
2026	Vanilla Ninja	"Too Epic to Be True"	English	Failed to qualify		11	79
2027	Confirmed intention to participate †						

== Songs by language ==
1. English (62.1%)
2. Estonian (27.3%)
3. Italian (4.55%)
4. Võro (3.03%)
5. Serbian (2.27%)

Songs	Language	Years
21	English	1999, 2000, 2001, 2002, 2003, 2005, 2006, 2007, 2010, 2011, 2014, 2015, 2016, 2017, 2019, ~~2020~~, 2021, 2022, 2023, 2025, 2026
9	Estonian	1993, 1994, 1996, 1997, 1998, 2009, 2012, 2013, 2024
2	Italian	2018, 2025
1	Võro	2004
1	Serbian	2008
1	German	2008
1	Finnish	2008

== Hostings ==
Year	Location	Venue	Presenters
2002	Tallinn	Saku Suurhall	Annely Peebo and Marko Matvere

== Related involvement ==
=== Conductors ===
Year	Conductor	Notes	Ref.
1993	Peeter Lilje	(Note: Conducted the Estonian entry at Kvalifikacija za Millstreet.)	
1994	Urmas Lattikas		
1996	Tarmo Leinatamm		
1997	Tarmo Leinatamm		
1998	Heiki Vahar		

=== Heads of delegation ===
Each participating broadcaster in the Eurovision Song Contest assigns a head of delegation as the EBU's contact person and the leader of their delegation at the event. The delegation, whose size can greatly vary, includes a head of press, the performers, songwriters, composers, and backing vocalists, among others.

Year	Head of delegation	Ref.
1997–2008	Juhan Paadam	
2009–2015	Heidy Purga & Mart Normet	
2016–2018	Mart Normet	
2019–2023	Tomi Rahula	
2024–	Riin Vann	

=== Costume designers ===
Year	Costume designers	Ref.
2013	Karolin Kuusik	

=== Commentators and spokespersons ===
Year	Television commentator	Radio commentator	Russian commentator	Spokesperson	Ref.
1986				Did not participate	
1987				Did not participate	
1988				Did not participate	
1989				Did not participate	
1990				Did not participate	
1991				Did not participate	
1992	Ivo Linna and Olavi Pihlamägi		No broadcast	Did not participate	
1993	Unknown		No broadcast	Did not participate	
1994	Vello Rand	Marko Reikop (Raadio 2)	No broadcast	Urve Tiidus	
1995	Jüri Pihel	No broadcast	No broadcast	Did not participate	
1996	Jüri Pihel	Marko Reikop (Raadio 2)	No broadcast	Annika Talvik	
1997	Jüri Pihel	Marko Reikop (Raadio 2)	No broadcast	Helene Tedre	
1998	Reet Linna	Marko Reikop (Raadio 2)	No broadcast	Urve Tiidus	
1999	Marko Reikop	Vello Rand (Raadio 2)	No broadcast	Mart Sander	
2000	Marko Reikop	Vello Rand (Raadio 2)	No broadcast	Evelin Samuel	
2001	Marko Reikop	Vello Rand (Raadio 2)	No broadcast	Ilo-Mai Küttim (Elektra)	
2002	Marko Reikop	Vello Rand (Raadio 2)	No broadcast	Ilo-Mai Küttim (Elektra)	
2003	Marko Reikop	Vello Rand (Raadio 2)	No broadcast	Ines	
2004	Marko Reikop	Vello Rand (Raadio 2)	No broadcast	Maarja-Liis Ilus	
2005	Marko Reikop	Mart Juur (Raadio 2); Andrus Kivirähk (Raadio 2)	No broadcast	Maarja-Liis Ilus	
2006	Marko Reikop	Mart Juur (Raadio 2); Andrus Kivirähk (Raadio 2)	No broadcast	Evelin Samuel	
2007	Marko Reikop	Mart Juur (Raadio 2); Andrus Kivirähk (Raadio 2)	No broadcast	Laura Põldvere	
2008	Marko Reikop	Mart Juur (Raadio 2); Andrus Kivirähk (Raadio 2)	No broadcast	Sahlene	
2009	Marko Reikop and Olav Osolin (final)	Mart Juur (Raadio 2); Andrus Kivirähk (Raadio 2)	No broadcast	Laura Põldvere	
2010	Marko Reikop and Sven Lõhmus (final)	Mart Juur (Raadio 2); Andrus Kivirähk (Raadio 2)	No broadcast	Rolf Roosalu	
2011	Marko Reikop	Mart Juur (Raadio 2); Andrus Kivirähk (Raadio 2)	No broadcast	Piret Järvis	
2012	Marko Reikop	Mart Juur (Raadio 2); Andrus Kivirähk (Raadio 2)	Ilja Ban, Dmitri Vinogradov and Aleksandra Moorast (Raadio 4)	Getter Jaani	
2013	Marko Reikop	Mart Juur (Raadio 2); Andrus Kivirähk (Raadio 2)	No broadcast	Rolf Roosalu	
2014	Marko Reikop	Mart Juur (Raadio 2); Andrus Kivirähk (Raadio 2)	No broadcast	Lauri Pihlap	
2015	Marko Reikop	Mart Juur (Raadio 2); Andrus Kivirähk (Raadio 2)	No broadcast	Tanja	
2016	Marko Reikop	Mart Juur (Raadio 2); Andrus Kivirähk (Raadio 2)	Aleksandr Hobotov	Daniel Levi Viinalass	
2017	Marko Reikop	Mart Juur (Raadio 2); Andrus Kivirähk (Raadio 2)	Aleksandr Hobotov and Julia Kalenda	Jüri Pootsmann	
2018	Marko Reikop	Mart Juur (Raadio 2); Andrus Kivirähk (Raadio 2)	Aleksandr Hobotov and Julia Kalenda	Ott Evestus	
2019	Marko Reikop	No broadcast	Aleksandr Hobotov and Julia Kalenda	Kelly Sildaru	
2021	Marko Reikop	No broadcast	Aleksandr Hobotov and Julia Kalenda	Sissi Benita	
2022	Marko Reikop	No broadcast	Aleksandr Hobotov and Julia Kalenda	Tanel Padar	
2023	Marko Reikop	No broadcast	Aleksandr Hobotov and Julia Kalenda	Ragnar Klavan	
2024	Marko Reikop	No broadcast	Aleksandr Hobotov and Julia Kalenda	Birgit Sarrap	
2025	Marko Reikop	Joosep Järvesaar and Kristel Aaslaid (Raadio 2)	Aleksandr Hobotov and Julia Kalenda	Kristjan Jakobson	
2026	Marko Reikop	No broadcast	Aleksandr Hobotov and Julia Kalenda	Getter Jaani	

== Photo gallery ==
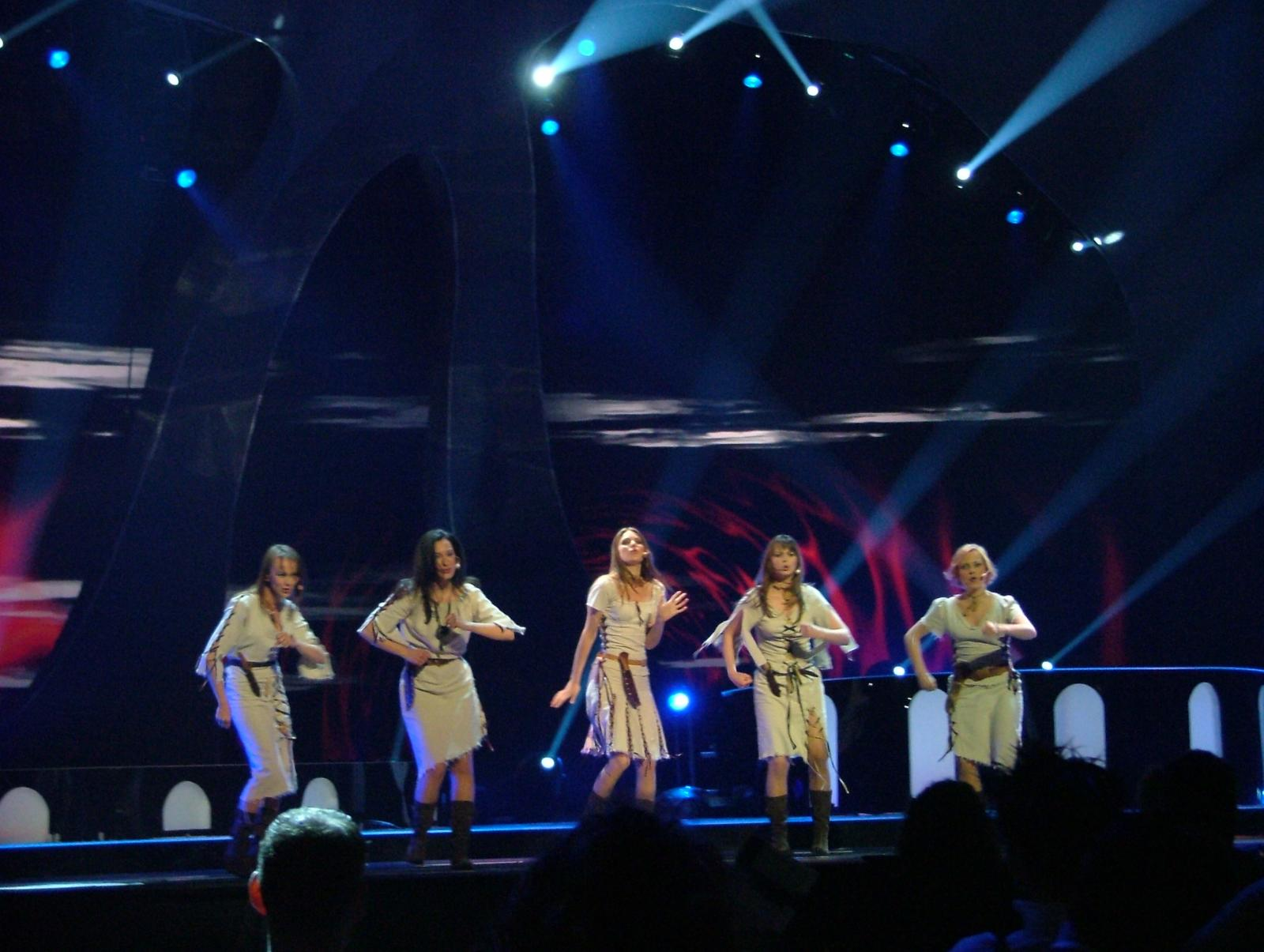
Neiokõsõ in Istanbul (2004)

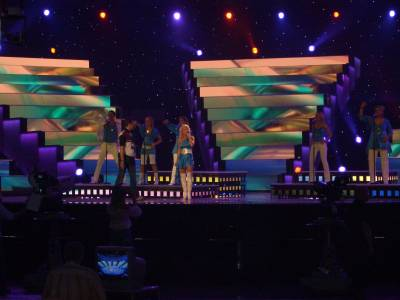
Sandra Oxenryd in Athens (2006)

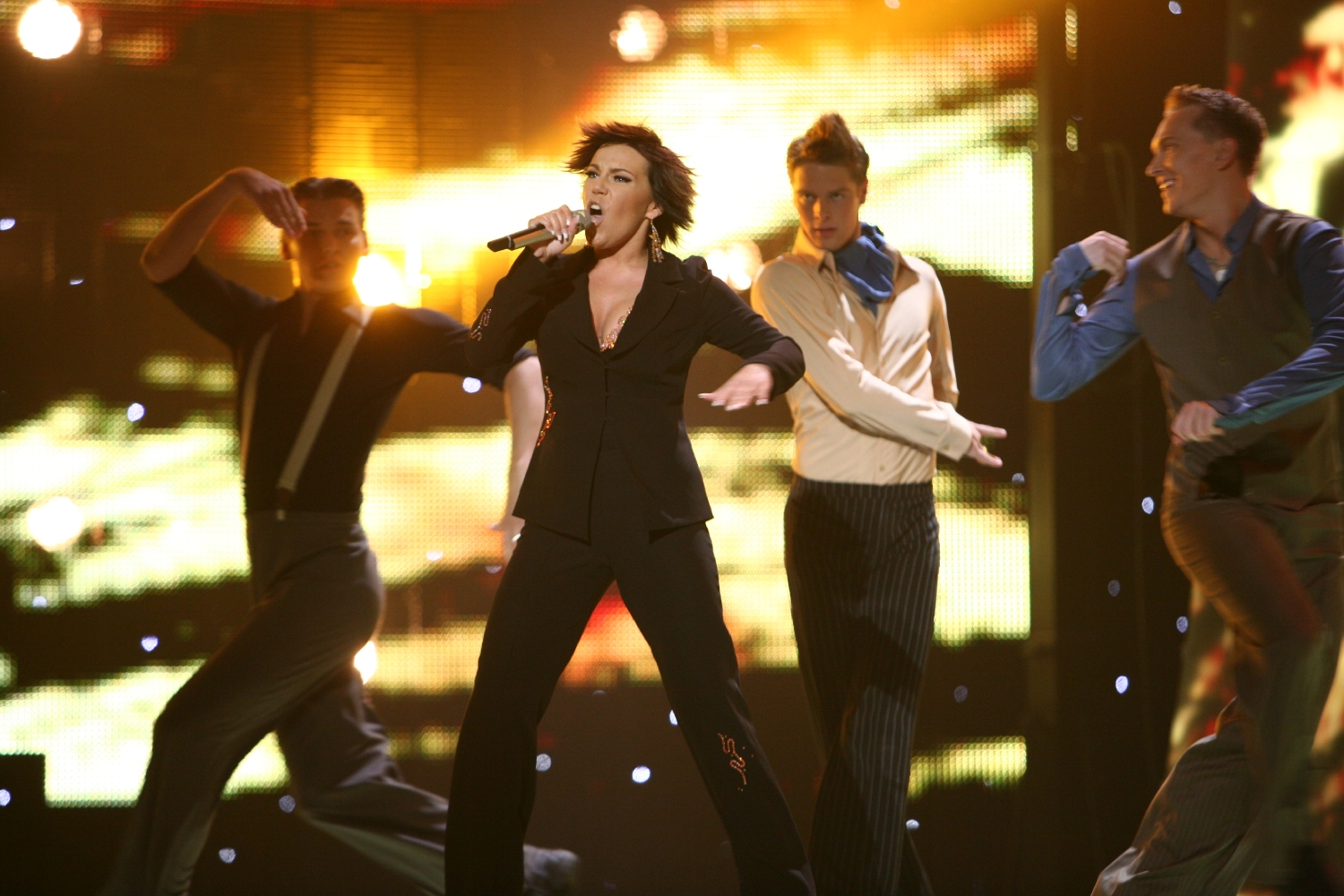
Gerli Padar in Helsinki (2007)

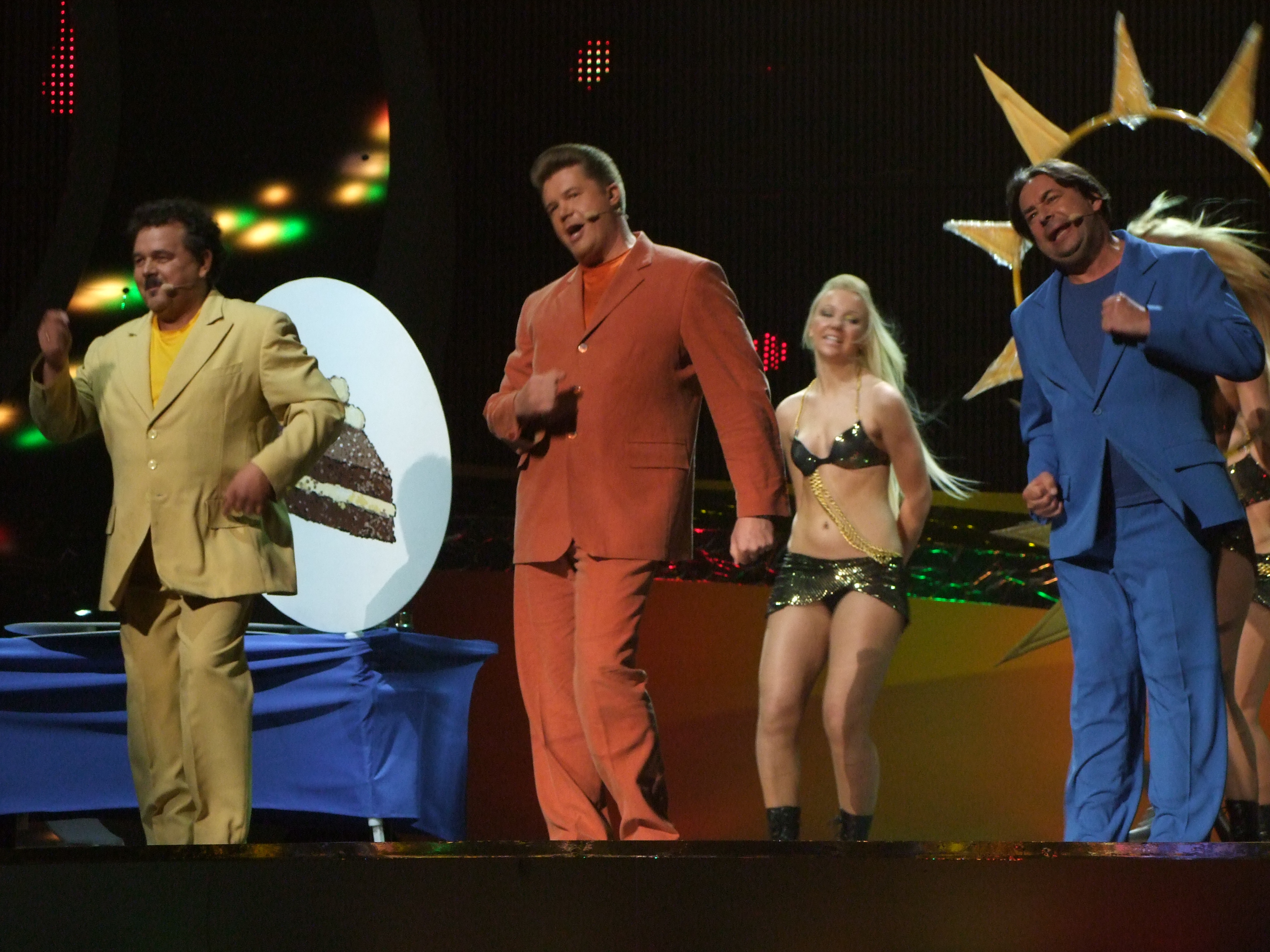
Kreisiraadio in Belgrade (2008)

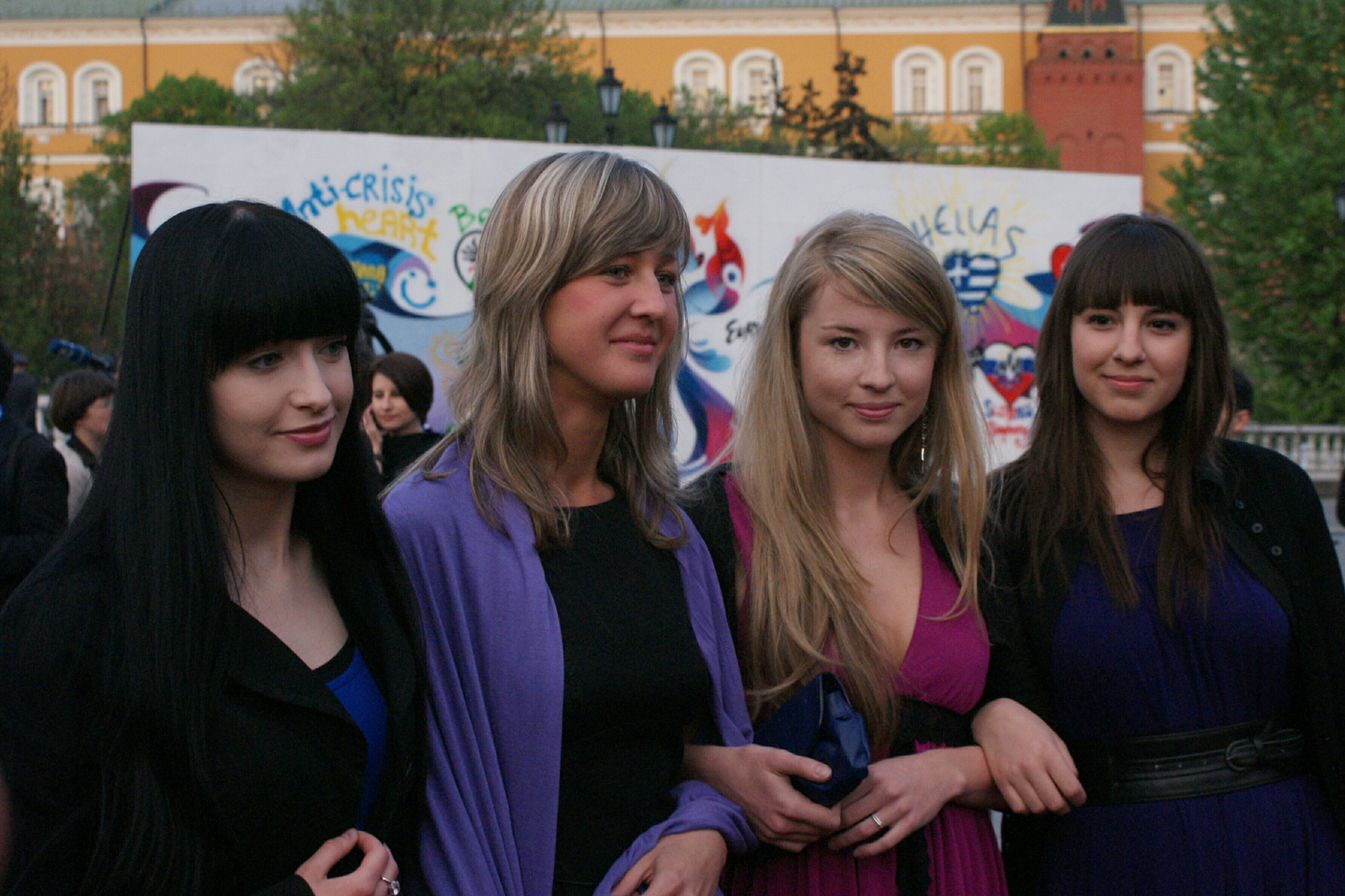
Urban Symphony in Moscow (2009)

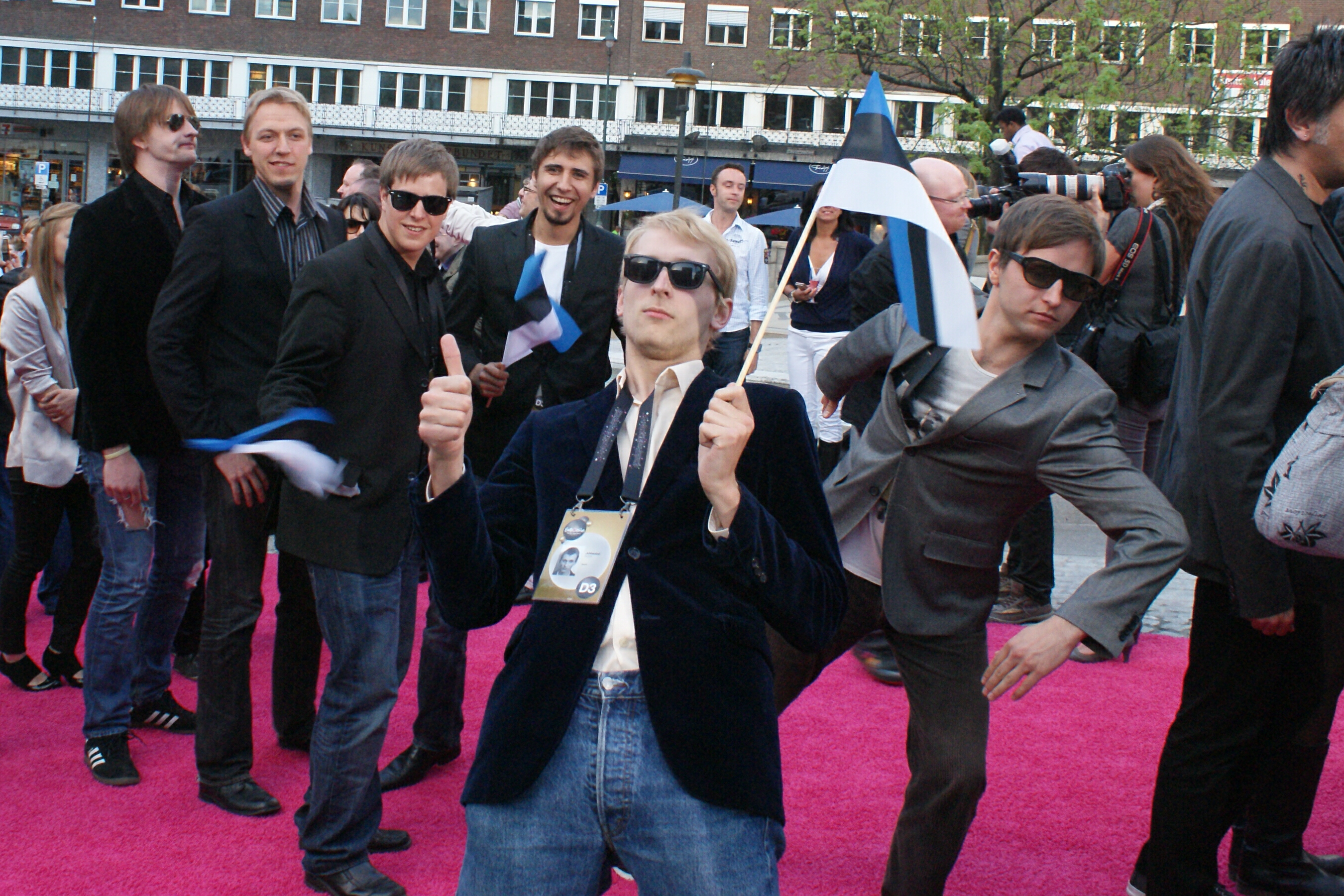
Malcolm Lincoln in Oslo (2010)

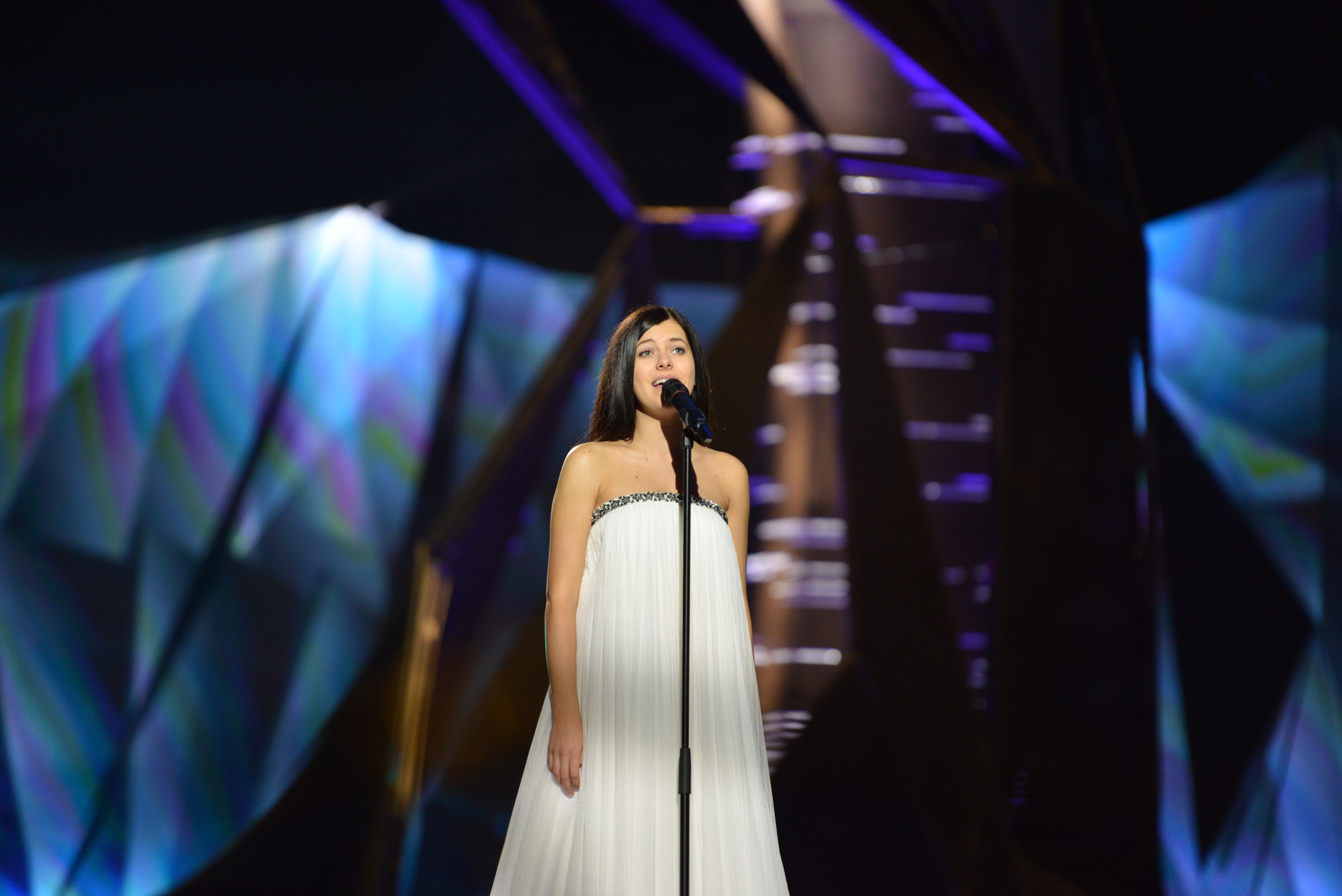
Birgit Õigemeel in Malmö (2013)

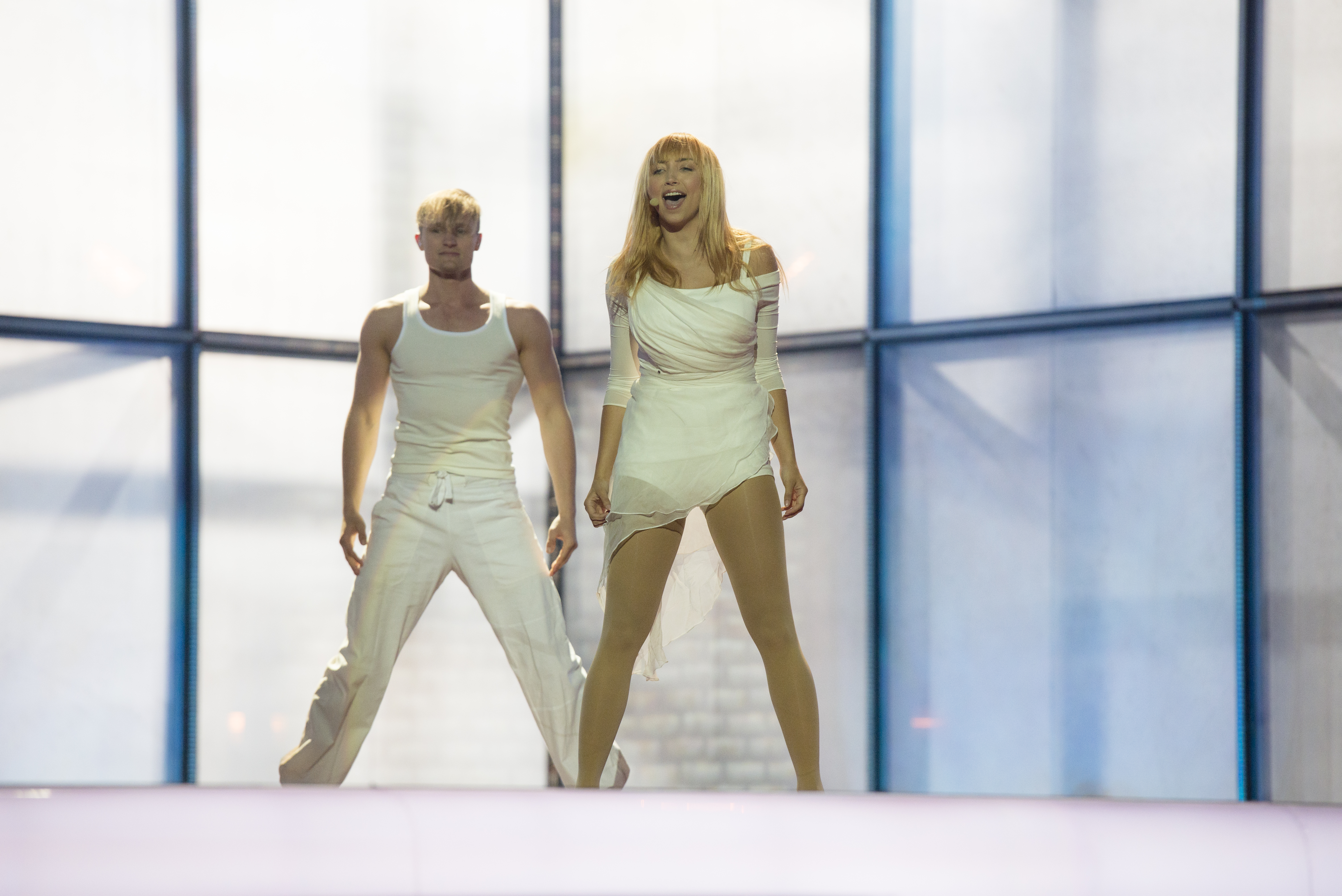
Tanja in Copenhagen (2014)

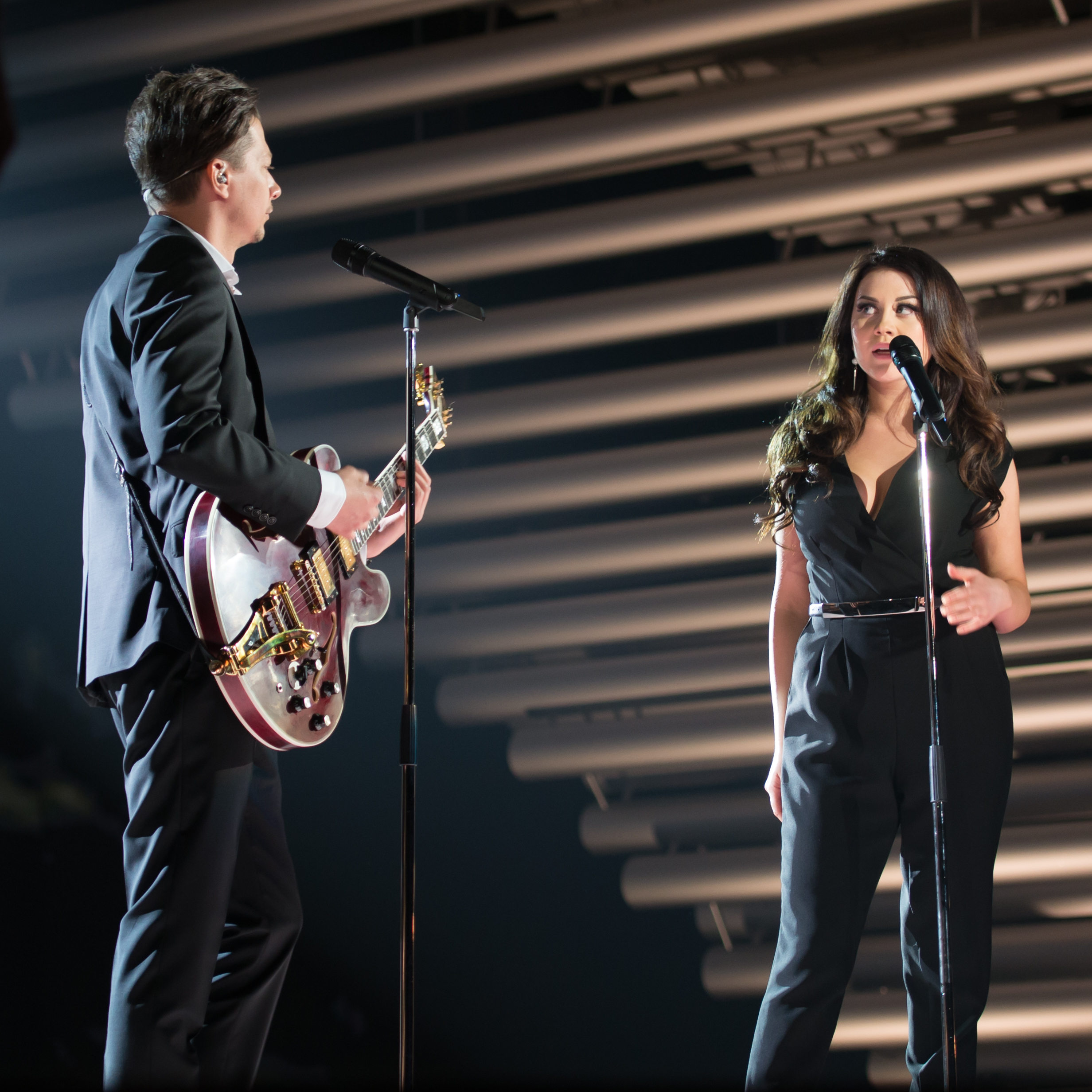
Elina Born and Stig Rästa in Vienna (2015)

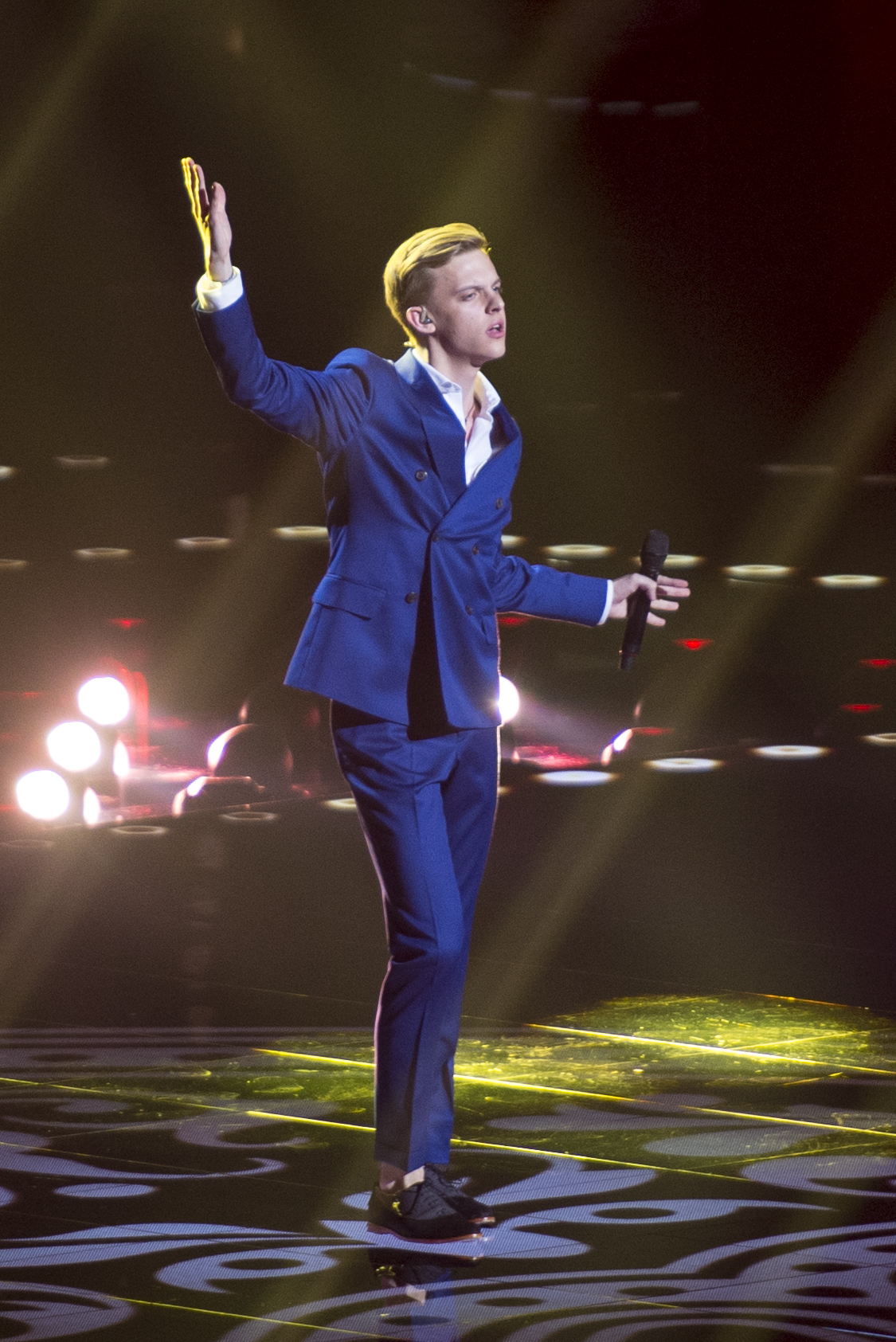
Jüri Pootsmann in Stockholm (2016)

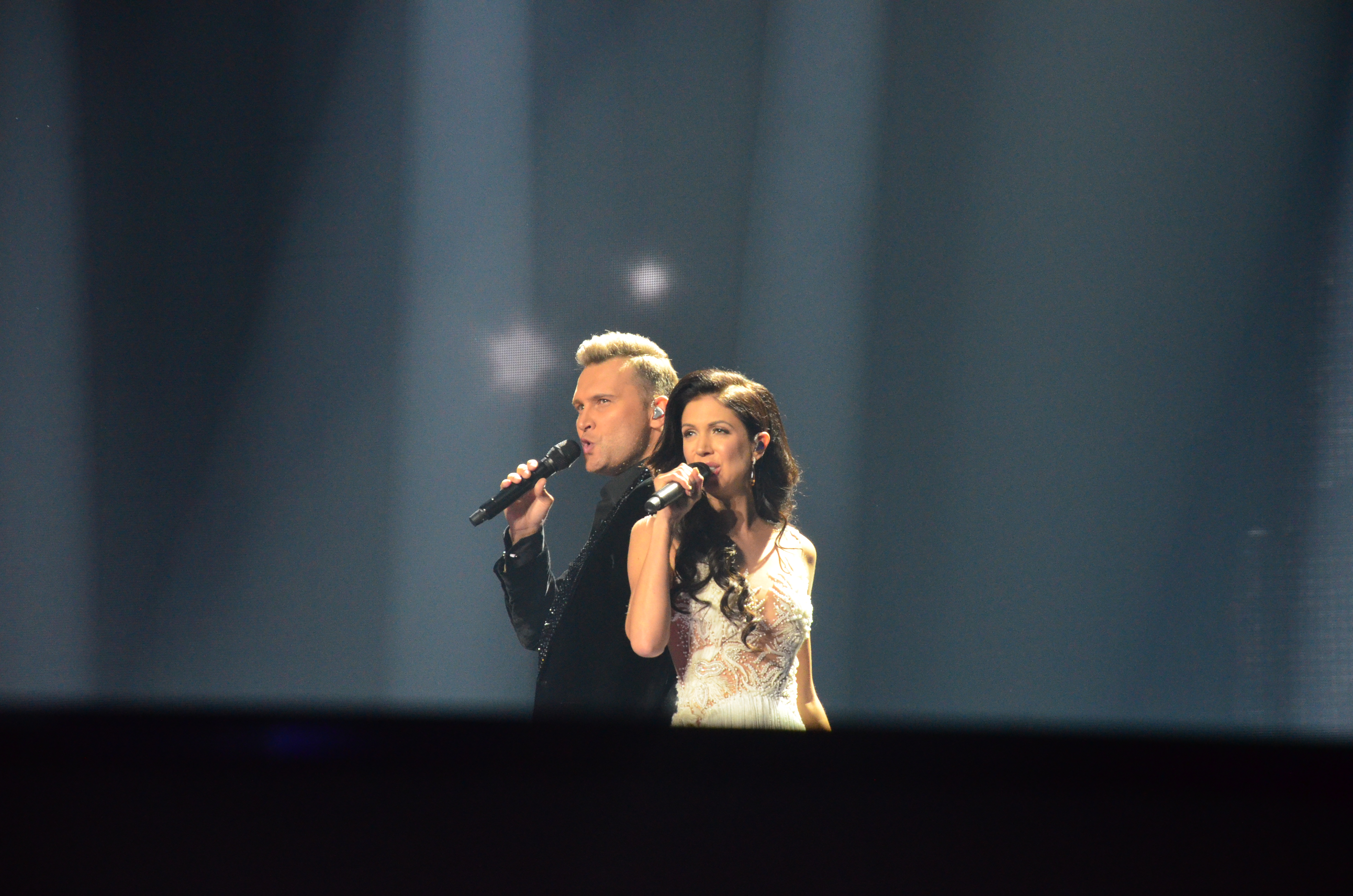
Koit Toome and Laura in Kyiv (2017)

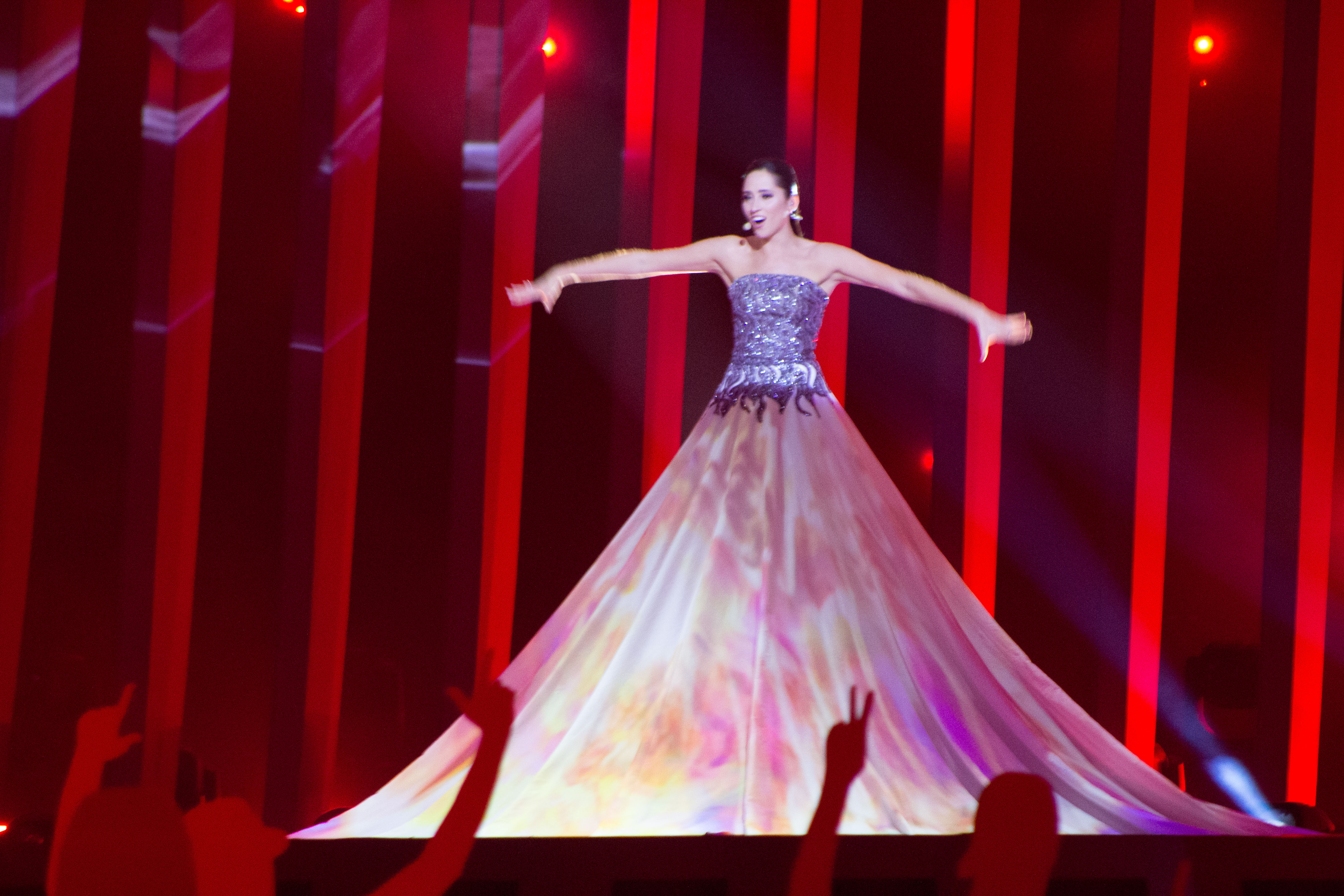
Elina Nechayeva in Lisbon (2018)

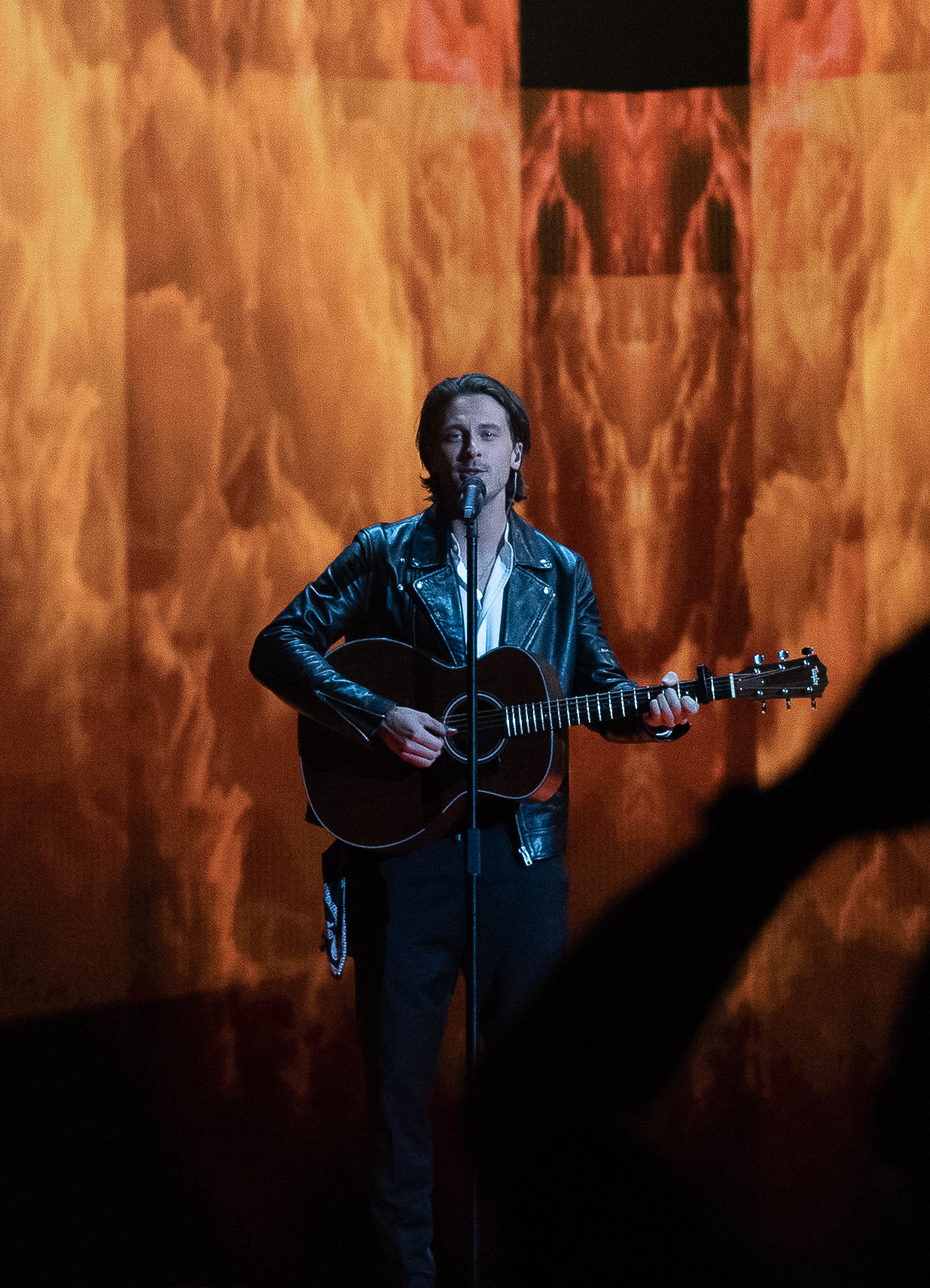
Victor Crone in Tel Aviv (2019)

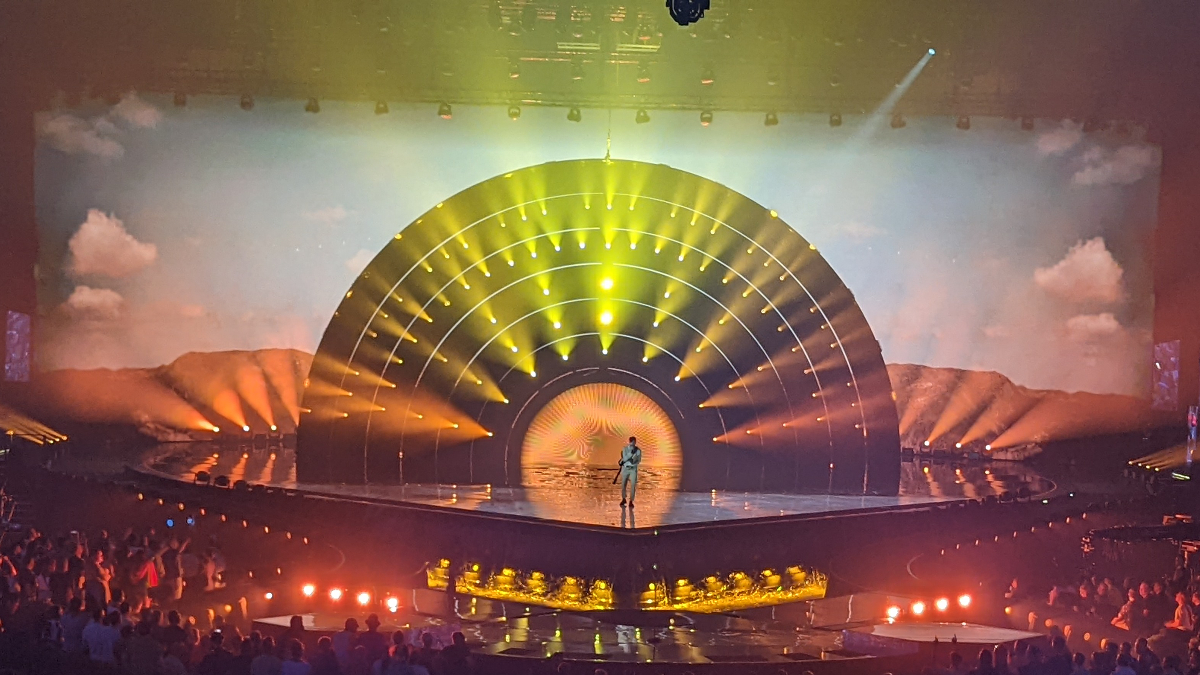
Stefan in Turin (2022)

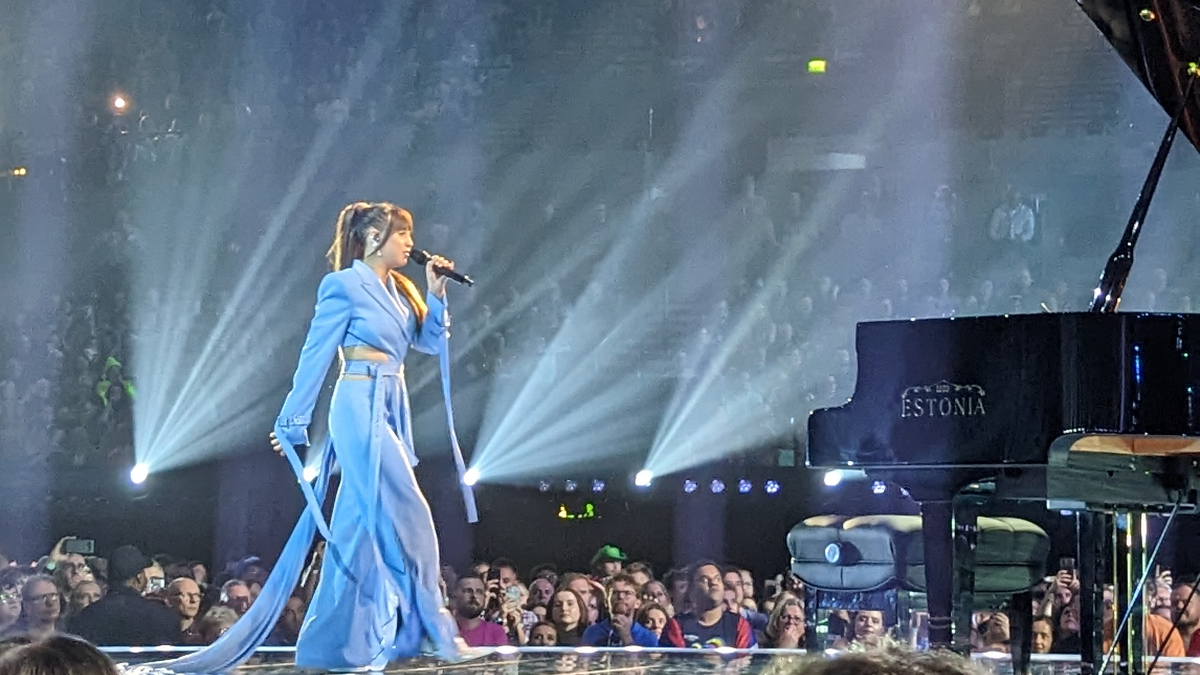
Alika in Liverpool (2023)

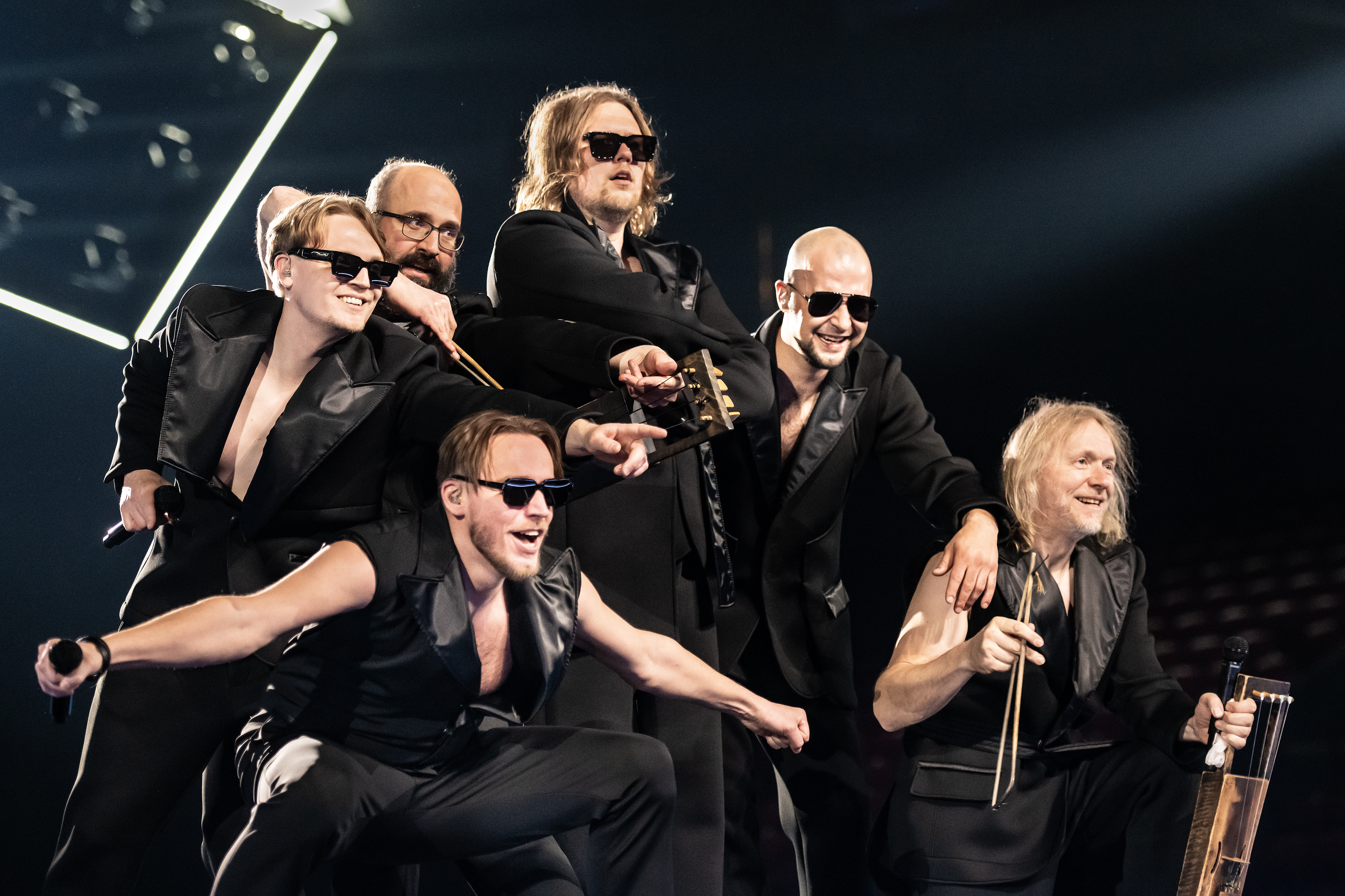
5miinust and Puuluup in Malmö (2024)

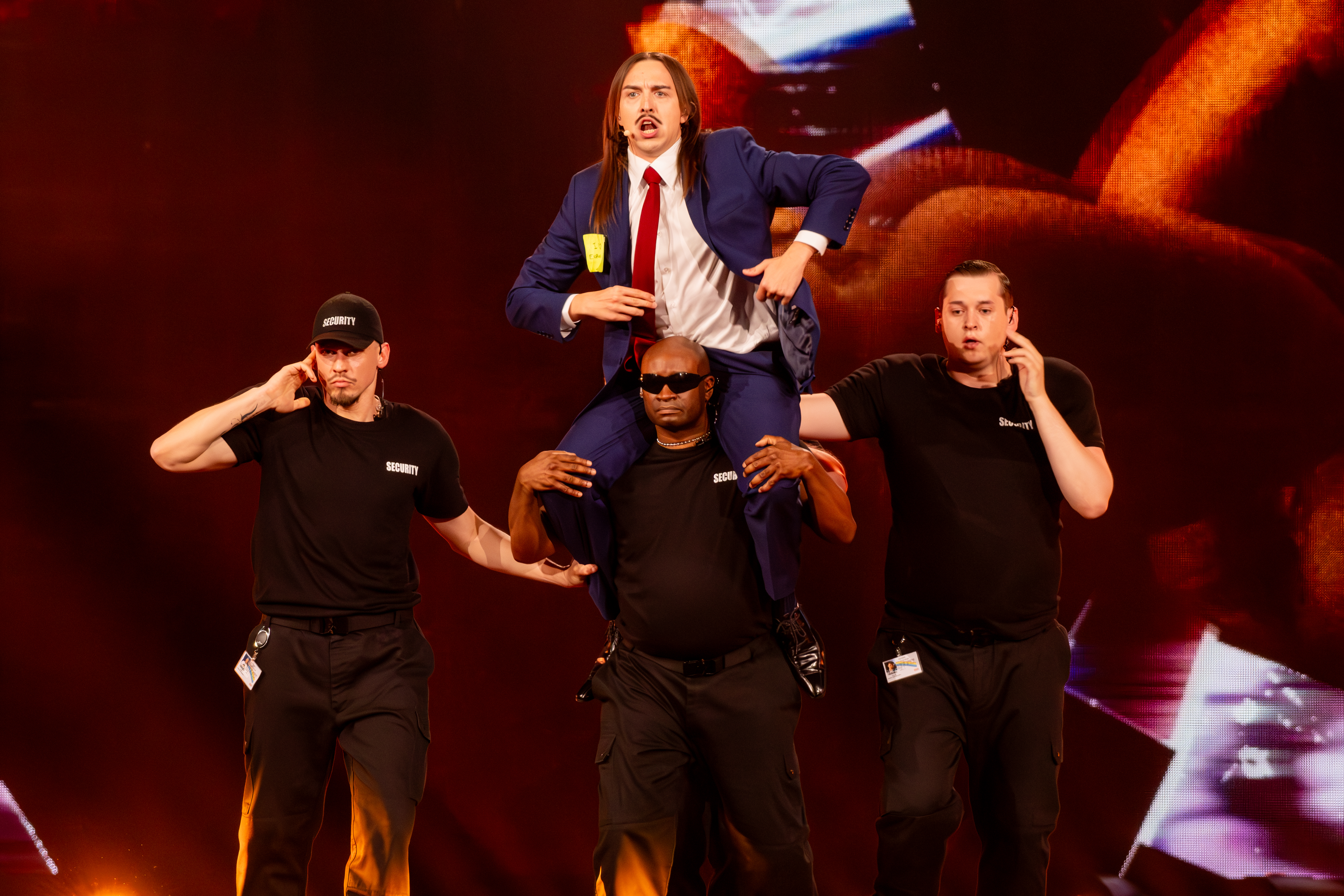
Tommy Cash in Basel (2025)

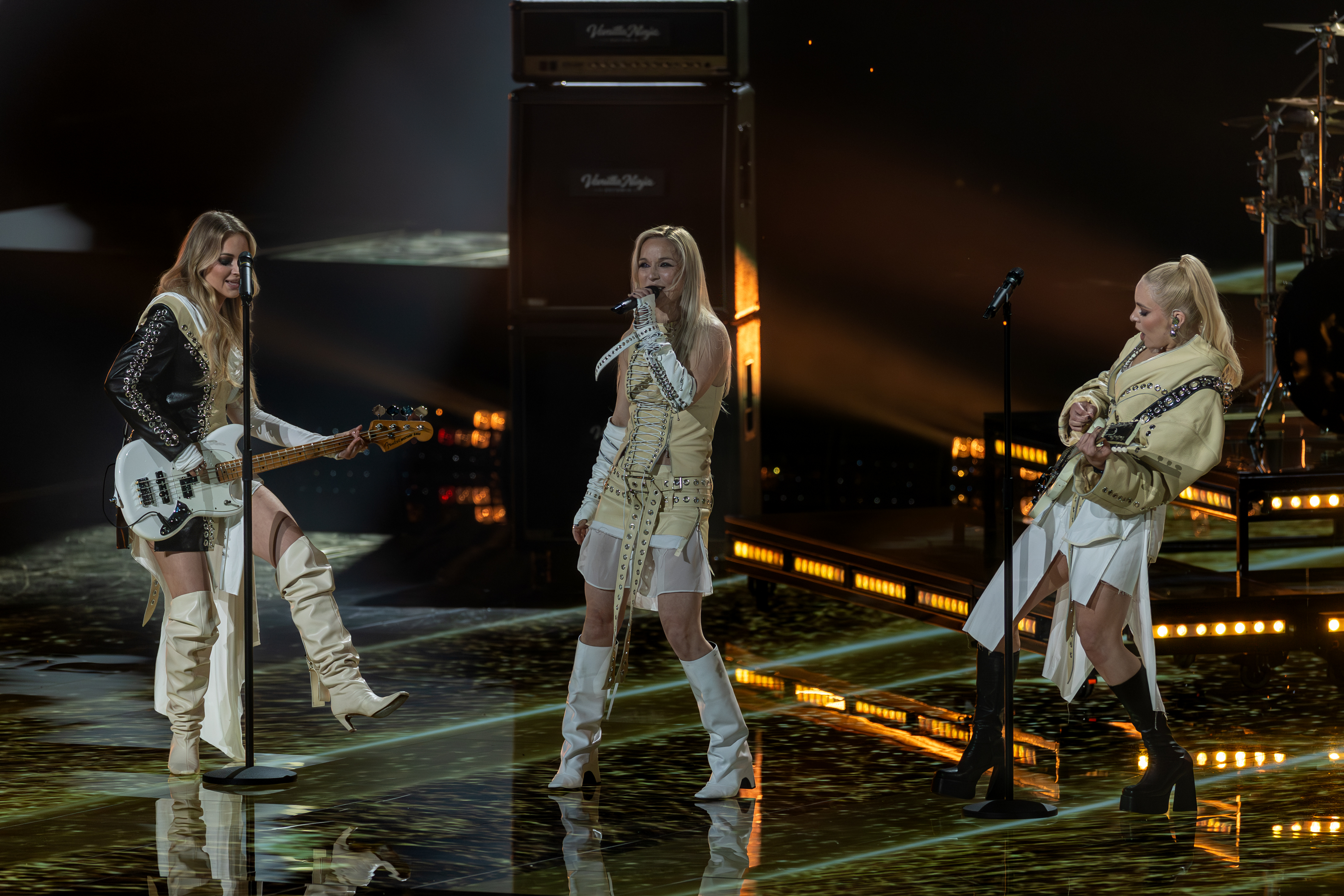
Vanilla Ninja in Vienna (2026)

== See also ==
- Estonia in the Junior Eurovision Song Contest
- Estonia in the Eurovision Young Dancers
- Estonia in the Eurovision Young Musicians
