= Tanel Padar =

Estonian singer and songwriter (born 1980)

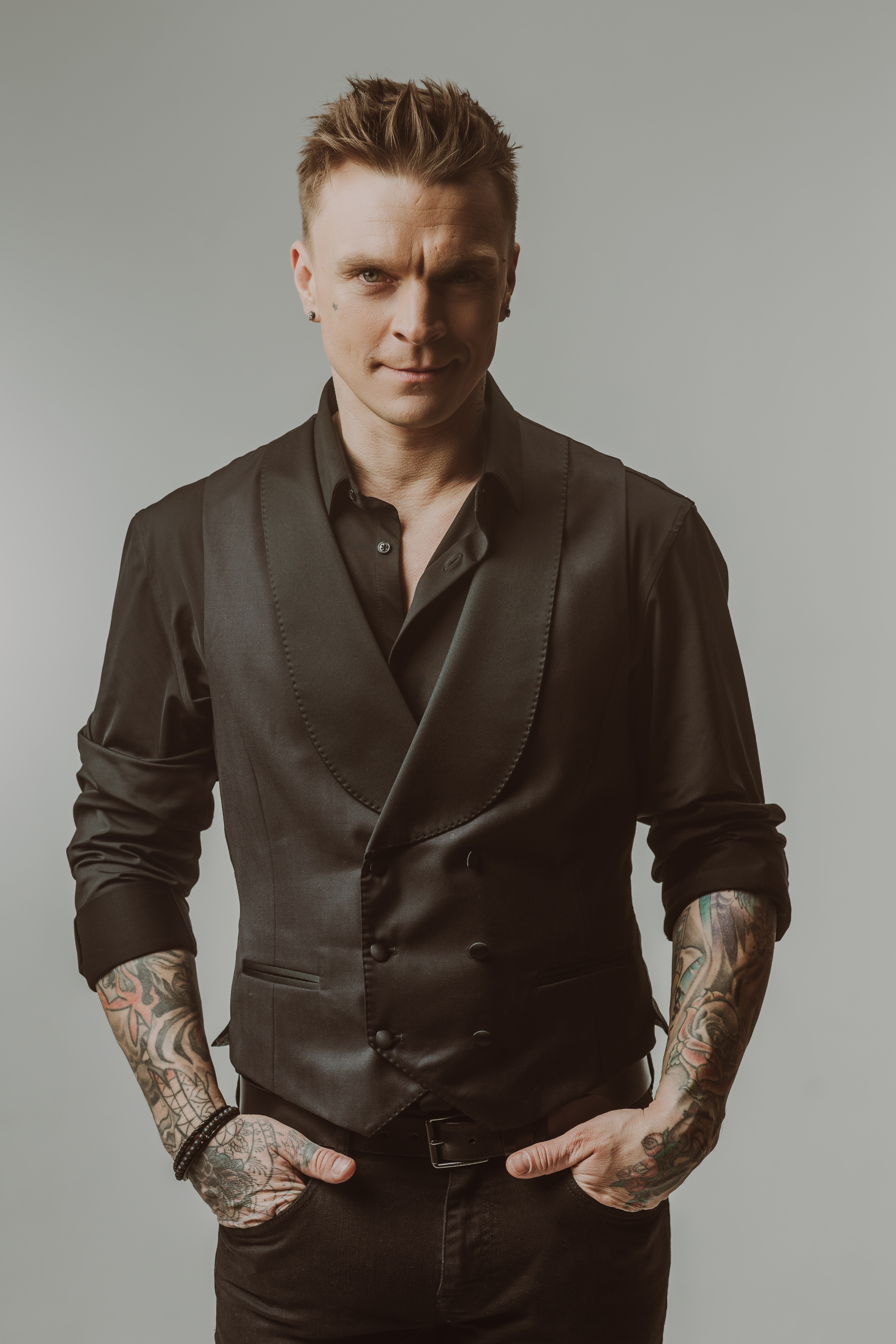
- Tanel Padar in 2022

Background information
- Born: Tanel Padar; 27 October 1980 (age 45); Uhtna, then part of Estonian SSR, Soviet Union
- Genres: Pop, rock
- Instruments: Vocals, guitar
- Years active: 1999–present
- Label: Padar Production
- Website: tanelpadar.com

Tanel Padar (born 27 October 1980) is an Estonian singer and songwriter. He is best known internationally for winning the Eurovision Song Contest 2001. Padar became famous by winning the Kaks takti ette, a biennial televised competition for young Estonian singers, in 1999.

== Career ==
In 1999 Padar won Kaks takti ette a televised competition for young Estonian singers.

In 2000, Padar was one of the backing vocalists for Ines – who at the time was also his girlfriend – at the Eurovision Song Contest 2000.

In 2001, he, along with the boyband 2XL and Aruba-born Dave Benton claimed the spotlight by winning the Eurovision Song Contest 2001 with the song "Everybody".

In 2003, Padar started a rock band called Tanel Padar & The Sun, which is one of the most popular bands in Estonia.

In 2006, Tanel Padar & The Sun had the following positions in the Estonian 2006 chart (top 40): #1, #4, #12, #23, #29, #31. One of their songs also claimed the R2 Hit of the Year prize. The song "Hopelessness You" made it to the MTV World Chart Express.

In 2017, 25.08. Tanel Padar & The Sun gives farewell concert in Kihnu island.

In 2017, Padar starts as a solo artist.

== Personal life ==
Tanel Padar's older sister is singer Gerli Padar, who represented Estonia in the Eurovision Song Contest 2007.

He was married to Katarina Kalda from 2003 until 2007.

He became engaged to Lauren Villmann in 2018. They have two daughters, Linda (2019) and Luna (2022).

== Discography ==
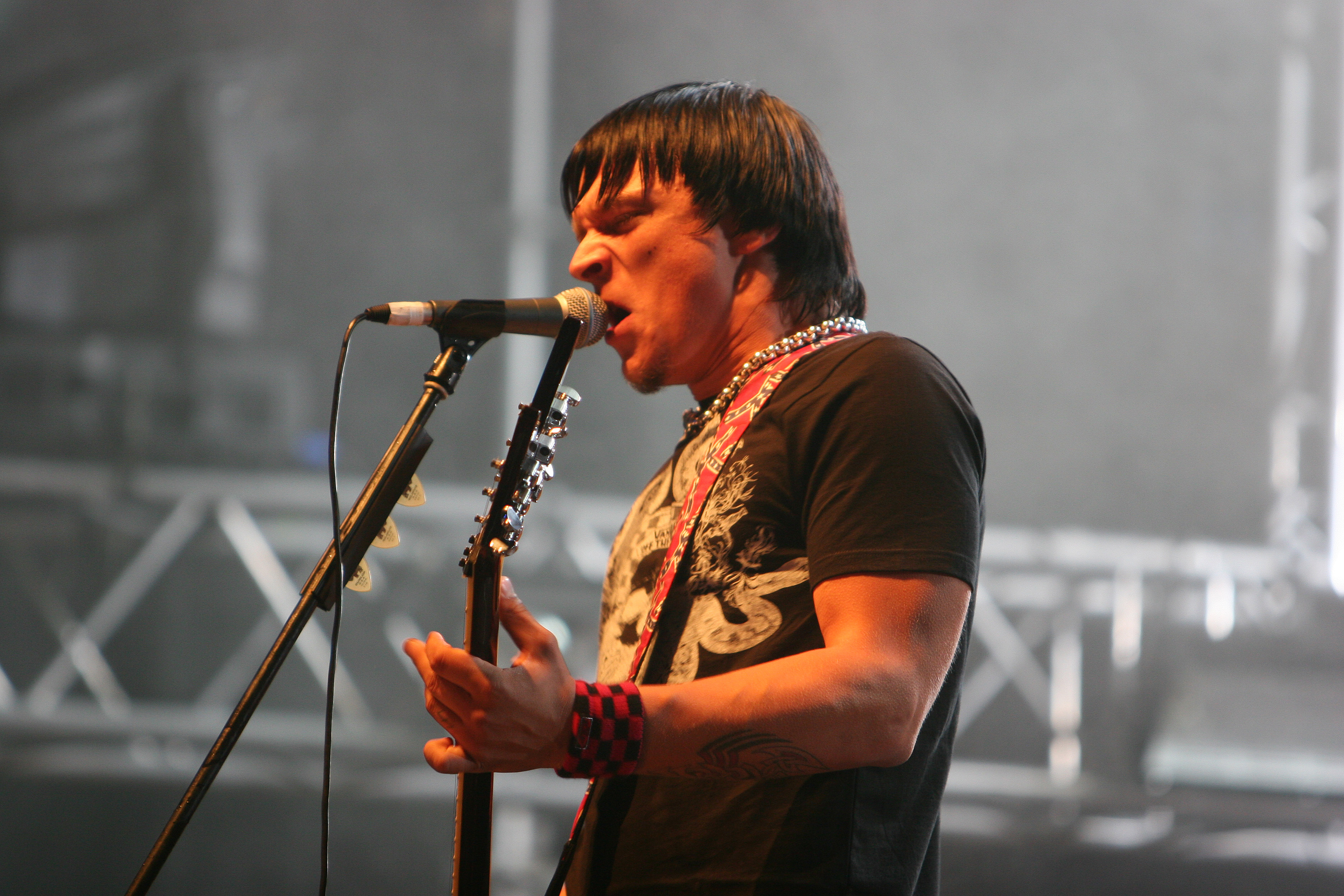
Tanel Padar in front of The Sun in 2006

=== Albums ===
- The Greatest Hits (2005)
- Veidi valjem kui vaikus (A bit louder than silence) (2005)
- 100% Rock'n'roll (2006)
- The Sun Live 2006 (2006)
- Veidi valjem kui vaikus II (A bit louder than silence II) (2007)
- Here Comes The Sun (2008)
- Unisex (2008)
- RING (2010)
- Veidi valjem kui vaikus III (A bit louder than silence III) (2015)
- Sinu aeg (Your time) (2020)

Awards and achievements
Preceded by (Denmark) Olsen Brothers with "Fly on the Wings of Love"	Winner of the Eurovision Song Contest (with Dave Benton and 2XL); 2001	Succeeded by (Latvia) Marie N with "I Wanna"
Preceded by Ines with "Once in a Lifetime"	Estonia in the Eurovision Song Contest (with Dave Benton and 2XL); 2001	Succeeded by Sahlene with "Runaway"
