= Tomi Rahula =

Estonian musician and football referee (born 1976)

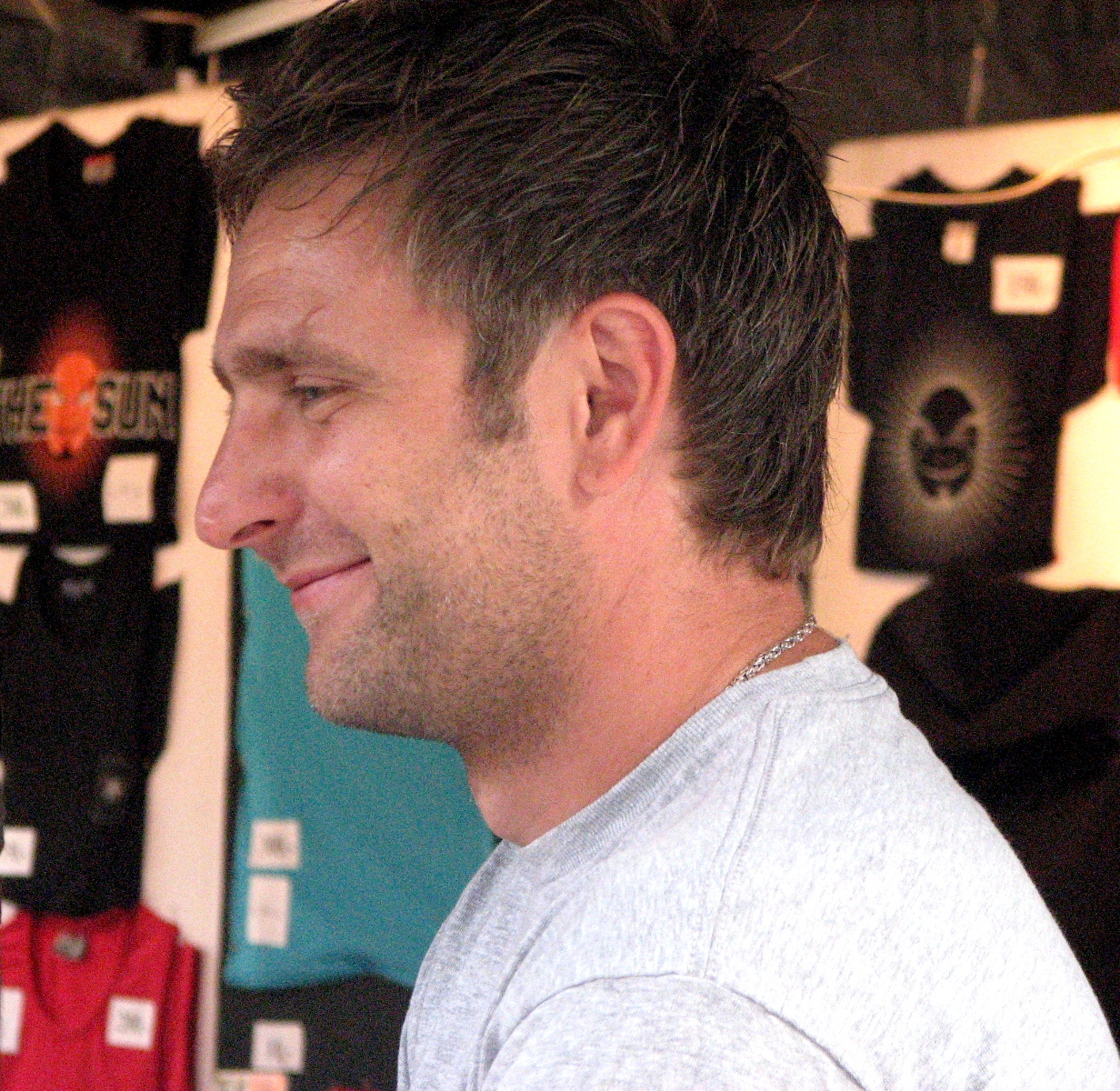
Tomi Rahula

Tomi Rahula (born 3 November 1976) is an Estonian musician and football referee with A-licence, a former member of the bands The Sun and Outloudz.

He was the chief producer of Eesti Laul, the Estonian selection for the Eurovision Song Contest, between the 2019 and 2023 editions.
