= Ithaka Maria =

Estonian singer and songwriter (born 1979)

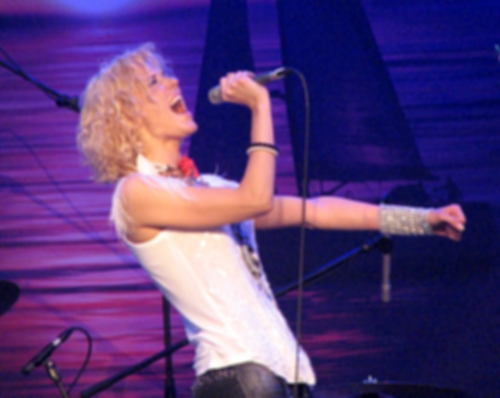
Ithaka Maria in 2012

Ithaka Maria Harito (born Gyrcelea-Ithaka-Maria Pruuli in Tallinn on 21 June 1979; former surname Rahula) is an Estonian singer and songwriter.

She studied at the Georg Ots Tallinn Music College (1994-1996) and at the Estonian Academy of Music and Theatre.

She has been a member of the bands Best B4 (1996-1997) and Slobodan River (2000-2006).

She has also been the host for the television series Eesti otsib superstaari.
