= Runaway (Sahlene song) =

2002 song by Sahlene

Single by Sahlene
- Released: 2002
- Composers: Alar Kotkas; Ilmar Laisaar; Pearu Paulus
- Lyricist: Jana Hallas

Eurovision Song Contest 2002 entry
- Country: Estonia
- Artist: Anna Cecilia Sahlin
- As: Sahlene
- Language: English
- Composers: Alar Kotkas; Ilmar Laisaar; Pearu Paulus
- Lyricist: Jana Hallas

Finals performance
- Final result: 3rd (tie)
- Final points: 111

Entry chronology
- ◄ "Everybody" (2001)
- "Eighties Coming Back" (2003) ►

"Runaway" is a song by Sahlene. It represented Estonia in the Eurovision Song Contest 2002.

== Music, lyrics and production ==
The song is an upbeat number with English lyrics which advise the narrator's "babe" to be more open minded in his life's vision: "just runaway to the stars / I'll be waiting above". The resemblance of the melody of "Runaway" to that of "I Believe I Can Fly" was much noted: Alar Kotkas, co-writer of "Runaway", recognized the songs were similar but denied any plagiarism.

The studio recording of "Runaway" was produced by Erik Bernholm: the background vocals were performed by Sahlene with one of her Eurovision backing vocalists Lena Olsson-Björkén. "Runaway" was Sahlene's only release on Virgin Records: the track made its album debut on her 2003 album release It's Been a While (M&L Records).

== Placing the song with a performer ==
The song's composers Pearu Paulus, Ilmar Laisaar and Alar Kotkas (music) and Jana Hallas (lyrics), had previously written "Once In A Lifetime", the Estonian entrant for Eurovision 2000 performed by Ines who was at first set to perform the song. However, Ines withdrew shortly before Eurolaul 2002 – the Estonian preselection Eurovision round – and the song's composers, after unsuccessfully shopping their song to a number of Estonian singers including Koit Toome – contacted the Swedish division of Virgin Records who suggested Sahlene who was on the Virgin roster: on the evening of the same day Sahlene received a telephone call from Virgin Records and resultantly flew out to the Estonian capital of Tallinn at 6 a.m. the following morning. Sahlene had two weeks to work with the song's composers prior to performing "Runaway" in Eurolaul.

== Performance at Eurolaul 2002 ==
Eurolaul 2002 was held at the Linnahall on the evening of January 26, 2002 and broadcast live on ETV.

Performed ninth in a field of ten Eurolaul entrants, "Runaway" was not the top vote getter from the television viewers who were invited to vote for their favorite number and who favored "Another Country Song" by Nightlight Duo & Cowboys which entrant received 40% of the popular vote. However the official decision as to the winner of Eurolaul was made by an international panel of eight judges whose votes decided that "Runaway" by Sahlene would be the Estonian entrant at Eurovision 2002, the judges' vote awarding "Runaway" eighty-five points, twenty more than the Eurolaul runner-up which was "Another Country Song".

== Performance at the Eurovision Song Contest 2002 ==
On the night of May 25, 2002 at the Eurovision Song Contest mounted at Saku Suurhall Arena in Tallinn, "Runaway" was the eighth entrant performed, following Russia's Prime Minister with "Northern Girl" and preceding Macedonia's Karolina with "Od nas zavisi". Sahlene performed in a white leather outfit she'd designed with lyricist Jana Hallas: she wore a midriff baring sleeveless shirt with a plunging v-neck and a fringe over one arm, a slotted skirt and high boots. Although Sahlene's performance at Eurolaul two months previous had featured a chorale of Estonian vocalists: specifically Kaire Vilgats, Dagmar Oja, Pearu Paulus and Johannes Lõhmus, her backing ensemble for Eurovision featured only two vocalists, one Estonian, Jelena Juzvik, and one Swedish, Lena Olsson-Björkén. The musicians who played behind Sahlene at Eurovision were Estonian drummer Jüri Mazuchak and two Swedish guitarists: Joel Sahlin – Sahlene's brother – and Charlotte Berg. At the close of voting, the tally for "Runaway" was 111 points, which result tied "Runaway" with the United Kingdom entrant "Come Back" by Jessica Garlick for third place in a field of twenty-four. In the official Eurovision rankings, "Runaway" is listed as finishing in third place at Eurovision 2002 with "Come Back" finishing fourth: the preferment of "Runaway" is based on it having secured two first place votes on the night of competition, specifically from Latvia and Sweden, while "Come Back" received only one first place vote, that being from Austria.

"Runaway" was succeeded as Estonian representative at the 2003 contest by Ruffus with "Eighties Coming Back".

The composers of "Runaway" would again compose an Estonian entry for Eurovision: the Eurovision 2006 entrant "Through My Window" which, like "Runaway", was performed by a Swedish vocalist, in this case Sandra Oxenryd.

== Chart performance ==
On the June 6, 2006 chart of the Top 60 singles in Sweden, "Runaway" by Sahlene debuted at #20: this proved to be the track's peak although it remained on the chart for a total of seventeen weeks, thirteen of them in the Top 40 with seven of those weeks spent in the Top 25.

| Chart (2002) | Peak position |
|---|---|
| Sweden (Sverigetopplistan) | 20 |
