= Estonia in the Eurovision Song Contest 2014 =

- Eurovision Song Contest 2014
- Participating broadcaster: Eesti Rahvusringhääling (ERR)
- Country: Estonia
- Selection process: Eesti Laul 2014
- Selection date: 1 March 2014

Competing entry
- Song: "Amazing"
- Artist: Tanja
- Songwriters: Timo Vendt; Tanja

Placement
- Semi-final result: Failed to qualify (12th)

Participation chronology

Estonia was represented at the Eurovision Song Contest 2014 with the song "Amazing" written by Timo Vendt and Tanja. The song was performed by Tanja. The Estonian broadcaster Eesti Rahvusringhääling (ERR) organised the national final Eesti Laul 2014 in order to select the Estonian entry for the 2014 contest in Copenhagen, Denmark. The national final consisted of three shows: two semi-finals and a final. Ten songs competed in each semi-final and the top five from each semi-final as determined by a jury panel and public vote qualified to the final. In the final, the winner was selected over two rounds of voting. In the first round, a jury panel and a public vote selected the top two to qualify to the superfinal. In the superfinal, "Amazing" performed by Tanja was selected as the winner entirely by a public vote.

Estonia was drawn to compete in the first semi-final of the Eurovision Song Contest which took place on 6 May 2014. Performing during the show in position 3, "Amazing" was not announced among the top 10 entries of the first semi-final and therefore did not qualify to compete in the final. It was later revealed that Estonia placed twelfth out of the 16 participating countries in the semi-final with 36 points.

== Background ==
Prior to the 2014 contest, Estonia had participated in the Eurovision Song Contest nineteen times since its first entry in 1994, winning the contest on one occasion in 2001 with the song "Everybody" performed by Tanel Padar, Dave Benton and 2XL. Following the introduction of semi-finals for the 2004, Estonia has, to this point, managed to qualify to the final on four occasions. In 2013, "Et uus saaks alguse" performed by Birgit managed to qualify Estonia to the final where the song placed twentieth.

The Estonian national broadcaster, Eesti Rahvusringhääling (ERR), broadcasts the event within Estonia and organises the selection process for the nation's entry. ERR confirmed Estonia's participation at the 2014 Eurovision Song Contest on 18 July 2013. Since their debut, the Estonian broadcaster has organised national finals that feature a competition among multiple artists and songs in order to select Estonia's entry for the Eurovision Song Contest. The Eesti Laul competition has been organised since 2009 in order to select Estonia's entry and on 2 October 2013, ERR announced the organisation of Eesti Laul 2014 in order to select the nation's 2014 entry.

== Before Eurovision ==
=== Eesti Laul 2014 ===
Eesti Laul 2014 was the sixth edition of the Estonian national selection Eesti Laul, which selected Estonia's entry for the Eurovision Song Contest 2014. The competition consisted of twenty entries competing in two semi-finals on 14 and 21 February 2014 leading to a ten-song final on 1 March 2014. All three shows were broadcast on Eesti Televisioon (ETV) with commentary by Indrek Vaheoja who was joined by Peeter Oja in the first semi-final and Mart Juur in the second semi-final as well as streamed online at the broadcaster's official website err.ee. The final was also broadcast via radio on Raadio 2 as well as streamed online at the official Eurovision Song Contest website eurovision.tv.

==== Format ====
The format of the competition included two semi-finals on 14 and 21 February 2014 and a final on 1 March 2014. Ten songs competed in each semi-final and the top five from each semi-final qualified to complete the ten song lineup in the final. The results of the semi-finals was determined by the 50/50 combination of votes from a professional jury and public televoting. The winning song in the final was selected over two rounds of voting: the first round results selected the top two songs via the 50/50 combination of jury and public voting, while the second round (superfinal) determined the winner solely by public televoting.

==== Competing entries ====
On 2 October 2013, ERR opened the submission period for artists and composers to submit their entries up until 9 December 2013. All artists and composers were required to have Estonian citizenship or be a permanent resident of Estonia and each artist and songwriter was only able to submit a maximum of three entries. A record 189 submissions were received by the deadline—breaking the previous record of 159, set during the 2012 edition. An 11-member jury panel selected 20 semi-finalists from the submissions and the selected songs were announced during the ETV entertainment program Ringvaade on 12 December 2013. The selection jury consisted of Maarja-Liis Ilus (singer), Janek Murd (musician), Erik Morna (Raadio 2 head of music), Siim Nestor (music critic), Kaupo Karelson (television producer), Valner Valme (music critic), Tauno Aints (composer), Ingrid Kohtla (Tallinn Music Week organiser), Owe Petersell (Raadio Elmar chief editor), Toomas Puna (Raadio Sky+ program director) and Kostja Tsõbulevski (musician).

Among the competing artists were previous Eurovision Song Contest entrants Lauri Pihlap, who represented Estonia as member of 2XL in 2001 together with Tanel Padar and Dave Benton, Lenna, who represented Switzerland in 2005 as member of the band Vanilla Ninja, and Sandra Nurmsalu, who represented Estonia in 2009 as part of the group Urban Symphony. August Hunt, Kõrsikud, Liisi Koikson (MiaMee), Maiken, Norman Salumäe, Sofia Rubina, Traffic and Tuuli Rand (lead singer of Vöörad) have all competed in previous editions of Eesti Laul.

Artist	Song	Songwriter(s)
August Hunt	"Kus on EXIT?"	August Hunt
Brigita Murutar	"Laule täis taevakaar"	Rainer Michelson, Feliks Kütt
Kõrsikud	"Tule ja jää"	Kõrsikud
Lauri Pihlap	"Lootus"	Lauri Pihlap
Lenna	"Supernoova"	Mihkel Raud
Maiken	"Siin või sealpool maad"	Kadri Koppel
Maltised	"Elu"	Jakko Maltis
MiaMee	"Fearful Heart"	Liina Saar, Liisi Koikson
NimmerSchmidt	"Sandra"	Fredy Schmidt, Andero Nimmer, Merilyn Merisalu
Nion	"Muud pole vaja"	Karl Kanter, Keit Triisa, Marilyn Jurman
Norman Salumäe	"Search"	Norman Salumäe
Sandra Nurmsalu	"Kui tuuled pöörduvad"	Sven Lõhmus
Sofia Rubina	"City Lights"	Priit Juurmann, Sofia Rubina
State of Zoe	"Solina"	Anneliis Kits, Sander Mölder
Super Hot Cosmos Blues Band	"Maybe-Maybe"	Mati Sütt, Janno Reim
Tanja	"Amazing"	Timo Vendt, Tanja
The Titles	"Flame"	Rasmus Lill, Markus Rafael Nylund
Traffic	"Für Elise"	Stig Rästa, Silver Laas
Vöörad	"Maailm on hull"	Priit Uustulnd, Meiko Humal
Wilhelm	"Resignal"	Lauri Kadalipp

==== Semi-finals ====
The two semi-finals took place on 14 and 21 February 2014, hosted by Helen Sürje and Henrik Kalmet. The live portion of the shows were held at the ERR studios in Tallinn where the artists awaited the results while their performances, which were filmed earlier at the ERR studios between 6 and 9 February 2014, were screened. In each semi-final ten songs competed for five spots in the final with the outcome decided upon by the combination of the votes from a jury panel and a public televote which registered 12,382 votes in the first semi-final and 11,767 votes in the second semi-final. The jury panel that voted in the semi-finals consisted of Nele-Liis Vaiksoo, Valner Valme, Anna Põldvee, Olav Osolin, Heini Vaikmaa, Mart Niineste, Erik Morna, Owe Petersell, Els Himma, Liis Lemsalu and Tauno Aints.

Semi-final 1 – 14 February 2014
R/O	Artist	Song	Jury	Televote		Total	Place
R/O	Artist	Song	Jury	Votes	Points	Total	Place
1	Tanja	"Amazing"	7	3,079	10	17	2
2	The Titles	"Flame"	4	312	2	6	8
3	Wilhelm	"Resignal"	6	1,065	6	12	5
4	State of Zoe	"Solina"	5	235	1	6	9
5	NimmerSchmidt	"Sandra"	3	506	4	7	6
6	Vöörad	"Maailm on hull"	1	948	5	6	7
7	Super Hot Cosmos Blues Band	"Maybe-Maybe"	8	2,676	9	17	3
8	August Hunt	"Kus on EXIT?"	2	462	3	5	10
9	Kõrsikud	"Tule ja jää"	9	1,460	7	16	4
10	Lenna	"Supernoova"	10	1,639	8	18	1

Semi-final 2 – 21 February 2014
R/O	Artist	Song	Jury	Televote		Total	Place
R/O	Artist	Song	Jury	Votes	Points	Total	Place
1	Norman Salumäe	"Search"	9	958	6	15	3
2	Lauri Pihlap	"Lootus"	5	620	3	8	8
3	Nion	"Muud pole vaja"	4	834	5	9	6
4	Maltised	"Elu"	1	720	4	5	9
5	Sofia Rubina	"City Lights"	3	379	1	4	10
6	MiaMee	"Fearful Heart"	7	397	2	9	7
7	Traffic	"Für Elise"	10	1,717	8	18	2
8	Maiken	"Siin või sealpool maad"	6	1,321	7	13	4
9	Sandra Nurmsalu	"Kui tuuled pöörduvad"	8	2,662	10	18	1
10	Brigita Murutar	"Laule täis taevakaar"	2	2,159	9	11	5

==== Final ====
The final took place on 1 March 2014 at the Nokia Concert Hall in Tallinn, hosted by Marko Reikop and Henrik Kalmet. The five entries that qualified from each of the two preceding semi-finals, all together ten songs, competed during the show. The winner was selected over two rounds of voting. In the first round, a jury (50%) and public televote (50%) determined the top two entries to proceed to the superfinal. In the superfinal, "Amazing" performed by Tanja was selected as the winner entirely by a public televote. The public vote in the first round registered 52,190 votes, and the vote in the superfinal registered 57,272 votes. In addition to the performances of the competing entries, Ott Lepland, who represented Estonia in the Eurovision Song Contest 2012, and Birgit Õigemeel, who represented Estonia in the Eurovision Song Contest 2013, performed as the interval act. The jury panel that voted in the first round of the final consisted of Maarja-Liis Ilus (singer), Erki Pärnoja (musician), Rolf Roosalu (singer), Getter Jaani (singer), Siim Nestor (music critic), Ott Lepland (singer), Koit Raudsepp (Raadio 2 presenter), Els Himma (singer), Leslie Da Bass (musician), Siiri Sisask (musician) and Tõnis Mägi (singer).

Final – 1 March 2014
R/O	Artist	Song	Jury		Televote		Total	Place
R/O	Artist	Song	Votes	Points	Votes	Points	Total	Place
1	Brigita Murutar	"Laule täis taevakaar"	22	1	2,965	6	7	7
2	Traffic	"Für Elise"	71	8	5,433	7	15	3
3	Norman Salumäe	"Search"	58	5	2,347	4	9	6
4	Wilhelm	"Resignal"	60	6	1,525	1	7	9
5	Lenna	"Supernoova"	82	9	2,941	5	14	4
6	Super Hot Cosmos Blues Band	"Maybe-Maybe"	98	10	11,940	10	20	1
7	Maiken	"Siin või sealpool maad"	51	3	1,769	2	5	10
8	Kõrsikud	"Tule ja jää"	58	4	2,256	3	7	8
9	Tanja	"Amazing"	60	7	10,580	9	16	2
10	Sandra Nurmsalu	"Kui tuuled pöörduvad"	45	2	10,434	8	10	5

Detailed Jury Votes
R/O	Song	M. Ilus	E. Pärnoja	R. Roosalu	G. Jaani	S. Nestor	O. Lepland	K. Raudsepp	E. Himma	Leslie Da Bass	S. Sisask	T. Mägi	Total
1	"Laule täis taevakaar"	1	2	2	3	2	1	1	1	7	1	1	22
2	"Für Elise"	10	6	6	8	8	2	2	8	10	3	8	71
3	"Search"	8	4	7	2	10	8	4	4	1	5	5	58
4	"Resignal"	5	8	5	1	7	7	3	6	6	6	6	60
5	"Supernoova"	6	10	4	10	6	5	7	9	8	8	9	82
6	"Maybe-Maybe"	9	9	9	9	5	9	9	10	9	10	10	98
7	"Siin või sealpool maad"	3	3	8	7	1	10	6	5	2	4	2	51
8	"Tule ja jää"	7	7	3	5	9	3	5	7	3	2	7	58
9	"Amazing"	4	5	10	6	3	6	8	3	5	7	3	60
10	"Kui tuuled pöörduvad"	2	1	1	4	4	4	10	2	4	9	4	45

Superfinal – 1 March 2014
R/O	Artist	Song	Televote	Place
1	Super Hot Cosmos Blues Band	"Maybe-Maybe"	26,918	2
2	Tanja	"Amazing"	30,354	1

== At Eurovision ==
Tanja presenting herself and "Amazing" at the Eurovision Song Contest 2014

According to Eurovision rules, all nations with the exceptions of the host country and the "Big Five" (France, Germany, Italy, Spain and the United Kingdom) are required to qualify from one of two semi-finals in order to compete for the final; the top ten countries from each semi-final progress to the final. The European Broadcasting Union (EBU) split up the competing countries into six different pots based on voting patterns from previous contests, with countries with favourable voting histories put into the same pot. On 20 January 2014, an allocation draw was held which placed each country into one of the two semi-finals, as well as which half of the show they would perform in. Estonia was placed into the first semi-final, to be held on 6 May 2014, and was scheduled to perform in the first half of the show.

Once all the competing songs for the 2014 contest had been released, the running order for the semi-finals was decided by the shows' producers rather than through another draw, so that similar songs were not placed next to each other. Estonia was set to perform in position 3, following the entry from Latvia and before the entry from Sweden.

The two semi-finals and the final were broadcast in Estonia on ETV with commentary by Marko Reikop. The first semi-final and final were also broadcast via radio on Raadio 2 with commentary by Mart Juur and Andrus Kivirähk. The Estonian spokesperson, who announced the Estonian votes during the final, was Lauri Pihlap who had previously represented Estonia in the Eurovision Song Contest in 2001 as member of 2XL.

=== Semi-final ===
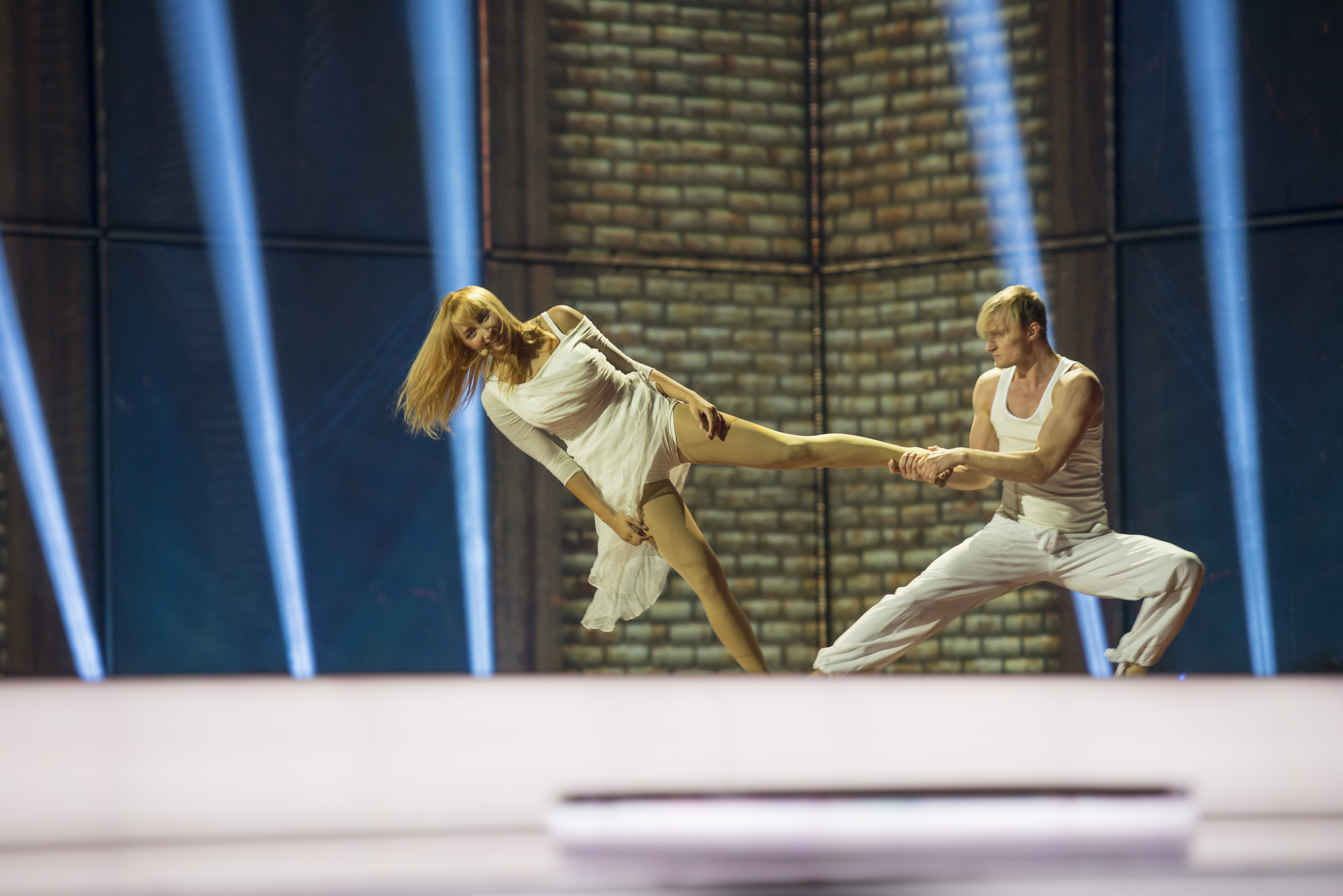
Tanja and dancer Argo Liik during a rehearsal before the first semi-final

Tanja took part in technical rehearsals on 28 April and 2 May, followed by dress rehearsals on 5 and 6 May. This included the jury show on 5 May where the professional juries of each country watched and voted on the competing entries.

The Estonian performance featured Tanja performing a contemporary dance choreography on stage in a white dress together with dancer Argo Liik. The stage LED screens transitioned from projections of wooden floors, which Tanja and Liik lied on at the beginning of the performance, and wooden window frames with brick finishes to flying birds and moving lines. Tanja was also joined by three backing vocalists: Kaire Vilgats, Marvi Vallaste and Marilin Kongo.

At the end of the show, Estonia was not announced among the top 10 entries in the first semi-final and therefore failed to qualify to compete in the final. It was later revealed that Estonia placed 12th in the semi-final, receiving a total of 36 points.

=== Voting ===
Voting during the three shows consisted of 50 percent public televoting and 50 percent from a jury deliberation. The jury consisted of five music industry professionals who were citizens of the country they represent, with their names published before the contest to ensure transparency. This jury was asked to judge each contestant based on: vocal capacity; the stage performance; the song's composition and originality; and the overall impression by the act. In addition, no member of a national jury could be related in any way to any of the competing acts in such a way that they cannot vote impartially and independently. The individual rankings of each jury member were released shortly after the grand final.

Following the release of the full split voting by the EBU after the conclusion of the competition, it was revealed that Estonia had placed sixteenth (last) with the public televote and tenth with the jury vote in the first semi-final. In the public vote, Estonia scored 13 points, while with the jury vote, Estonia scored 61 points.

Below is a breakdown of points awarded to Estonia and awarded by Estonia in the first semi-final and grand final of the contest, and the breakdown of the jury voting and televoting conducted during the two shows:

==== Points awarded to Estonia ====
Points awarded to Estonia (Semi-final 1)
Score	Country
12 points	
10 points	Latvia
8 points	
7 points	
6 points	
5 points	Armenia; Azerbaijan; Iceland; Sweden
4 points	France
3 points	
2 points	Spain
1 point	

==== Points awarded by Estonia ====
Points awarded by Estonia (Semi-final 1)
Score	Country
12 points	Netherlands
10 points	Ukraine
8 points	Hungary
7 points	Sweden
6 points	Latvia
5 points	Armenia
4 points	Azerbaijan
3 points	San Marino
2 points	Iceland
1 point	Russia

Points awarded by Estonia (Final)
Score	Country
12 points	Netherlands
10 points	Sweden
8 points	Ukraine
7 points	Hungary
6 points	Finland
5 points	Armenia
4 points	Austria
3 points	Norway
2 points	Spain
1 point	Russia

==== Detailed voting results ====
The following members comprised the Estonian jury:

- Laura Remmel (jury chairperson) – singer, represented Estonia in the 2005 contest as member of Suntribe
- Marju Länik – singer
- Rauno Märks – DJ, radio host
- Alar Kotkas – music producer, songwriter
- Rasmus Rändvee – singer

Detailed voting results from Estonia (Semi-final 1)
R/O	Country	L. Remmel	M. Länik	R. Märks	A. Kotkas	R. Rändvee	Jury Rank	Televote Rank	Combined Rank	Points
01	Armenia	4	7	7	12	4	6	9	6	5
02	Latvia	13	5	3	14	15	9	4	5	6
03	Estonia									
04	Sweden	2	4	4	1	2	1	5	4	7
05	Iceland	14	10	10	11	6	10	8	9	2
06	Albania	9	14	11	7	1	7	13	11	
07	Russia	11	8	14	15	12	14	6	10	1
08	Azerbaijan	5	6	6	6	3	5	12	7	4
09	Ukraine	3	3	5	3	8	4	2	2	10
10	Belgium	15	15	8	10	10	13	11	13	
11	Moldova	8	12	15	8	9	12	15	15	
12	San Marino	7	11	12	9	13	11	7	8	3
13	Portugal	10	13	13	13	14	15	10	14	
14	Netherlands	1	1	1	4	7	2	1	1	12
15	Montenegro	12	9	9	5	11	8	14	12	
16	Hungary	6	2	2	2	5	3	3	3	8

Detailed voting results from Estonia (Final)
R/O	Country	L. Remmel	M. Länik	R. Märks	A. Kotkas	R. Rändvee	Jury Rank	Televote Rank	Combined Rank	Points
01	Ukraine	3	4	12	3	12	4	5	3	8
02	Belarus	23	25	26	23	20	25	10	19	
03	Azerbaijan	8	5	11	11	4	6	25	15	
04	Iceland	19	20	19	24	15	23	13	20	
05	Norway	6	6	4	15	5	5	11	8	3
06	Romania	5	9	21	4	18	11	22	17	
07	Armenia	11	7	7	12	8	7	7	6	5
08	Montenegro	21	8	10	14	17	13	26	22	
09	Poland	25	26	23	25	23	26	17	25	
10	Greece	24	19	6	21	24	22	18	23	
11	Austria	10	11	15	9	2	8	8	7	4
12	Germany	14	23	24	8	7	15	19	18	
13	Sweden	2	1	2	1	1	1	3	2	10
14	France	16	24	13	22	14	19	20	21	
15	Russia	26	14	25	26	25	24	2	10	1
16	Italy	12	18	20	16	22	18	24	24	
17	Slovenia	22	16	18	13	21	21	23	26	
18	Finland	7	13	5	19	11	9	4	5	6
19	Spain	18	10	9	10	9	10	14	9	2
20	Switzerland	20	15	22	7	19	17	12	12	
21	Hungary	4	3	1	5	3	3	6	4	7
22	Malta	13	17	17	6	13	12	21	16	
23	Denmark	15	22	8	18	10	14	16	13	
24	Netherlands	1	2	3	2	6	2	1	1	12
25	San Marino	17	12	14	20	26	20	9	11	
26	United Kingdom	9	21	16	17	16	16	15	14	
