= Estonia in the Eurovision Song Contest 2027 =

- Eurovision Song Contest 2027
- Participating broadcaster: Eesti Rahvusringhääling (ERR)
- Country: Estonia
- Selection process: Eesti Laul 2027
- Selection date: 30 January 2027

Participation chronology

Estonia is set to be represented at the Eurovision Song Contest 2027 in Burgas. The Estonian participating broadcaster, Eesti Rahvusringhääling (ERR), will organise the national final Eesti Laul 2027 in order to select its entry for the contest.

== Background ==
Prior to the 2027 contest, Eesti Televisioon (ETV) until 2007, and Eesti Rahvusringhääling (ERR) since 2008, had participated in the Eurovision Song Contest representing Estonia thirty times since ETV's first entry in 1994, winning the contest in 2001 with the song "Everybody" performed by Tanel Padar, Dave Benton and 2XL. Following the introduction of semi-finals in 2004, Estonia has, to this point, managed to qualify to the final on eleven occasions. In 2026, "Too Epic to Be True" performed by Vanilla Ninja failed to qualify for the final.

As part of its duties as participating broadcaster, ERR organises the selection of its entry in the Eurovision Song Contest and broadcasts the event in the country. Since its debut, the Estonian broadcaster had organised national finals that featured a competition among multiple artists and songs in order to select its entry for the contest, with the Eesti Laul competition being organised since 2009. On 4 September 2026, ERR confirmed its participation at the 2027 contest and announced the organisation of Eesti Laul 2027 in order to select its entry.

== Before Eurovision ==
=== Eesti Laul 2027 ===
Eesti Laul 2027 is the nineteenth edition of the national selection Eesti Laul, organised by ERR to select its entry for the Eurovision Song Contest 2027. The competition will consist a 12-song final on 30 January 2027 at the Unibet Arena in Tallinn, and will be hosted by Eda-Ines Etti and Koit Toome.

==== Competing entries ====
On 4 September 2026, ERR opened a submission period for artists and composers to submit their entries up until 8 October 2026. Each artist and songwriter was able to submit a maximum of five entries. Foreign collaborators were allowed as long as one of the songwriters has Estonian citizenship or is a permanent resident of Estonia. A fee was also imposed on songs being submitted to the competition, with €50 for Estonian-language songs and €100 for songs in other languages; this increased to €150 for songs in Estonian and €250 for songs in other languages from 6 October 2026. 155 submissions were received by the deadline, of which 60 were in Estonian. A 40-member jury panel selected 12 finalists from the submissions and the selected songs were announced during the ETV entertainment program Ringvaade on 22 October 2026. Among the competing artists are Laura, who represented Estonia in 2005 as part of Suntribe and in 2017 alongside Koit Toome, and Kerli Kivilaan, who represented Estonia in 2026 as a member of Vanilla Ninja. Daniel Levi, Jaagup Tuisk, M Els, Johanna Elise, Minimal Wind, Ollie, Rita Ray, and Traffic have all competed in previous editions of Eesti Laul.

The competing songs will be revealed on 27 November 2026.

Selection jury members
- Alika
- Andi Aus
- Andres Panksepp
- Birgit Sarrap
- Danel Pandre
- Eik
- Eva Palm
- Getter Jaani
- Inga Tislar
- Ivar Must
- Johanna Mängel
- Jordan Laikre
- Julia Kornejeva
- Jüri Pootsmann
- Kaspar Viilup
- Keiti Väliste
- Kristjan Rabi
- Liina Raud
- Maian Kärmas
- Marek Miil
- Mart Normet
- Marta Püssa
- Merit Lutsar
- Merlyn Uusküla
- Ott Lepland
- Priit Pajusaar
- Ramo Teder
- Rauno Märks
- Rebecca Kontus
- Robin Pass
- Sidni Tomson
- Sten Teppan
- Synne Valtri
- Taavi Esperk
- Teele Viira
- Tuuli Põldvee
- Tõnn Kuuli
- Urmas Kolsar
- Ülar-Johannes Palm
- Yasmyn

Eesti Laul 2027 participating entries
Artist	Song	Songwriter(s)
Daniel Levi	"Dust"	Clifford Goilo; Daniel Levi Viinalass
Jaagup Tuisk and Wanda	"Kesk öö musta merd"	Jaagup Tuisk; Lauri Räpp; Wanda-Helene Ollep
Johanna Elise	"Getaway Car"	Anna Graceman; Gevin Niglas
Kerli Kivilaan	"When the World is Over"	Gevin Niglas; Kerli Kivilaan
Laura	"Metsapiiga"	Vahur Valgmaa
M Els and J-Run	"Hush Hush"	Gevin Niglas; Jeroen Nai Chung Tong; Merili Käsper
Ollie	"Sad Every Day"	Oliver Mazurtšak
Pale Alison and Minimal Wind	"Superhuman"	Evelina Koop; Jelizaveta Anderžanova; Paula Pajusaar; Taavi-Hans Kõlar
Panørama, Vemka and Hans Markus	"Reflection"	Hans Markus Danilas; Laura Prits; Martin Veem; Noah Schatteiner; Steven-Marten Suur; Villem Rootalu
Rita Ray	"Don't You Agree"	Eric Timmann; Johannes Laas; Kristi Raias; Robine Koerts
Traffic	"Laava"	Fred Krieger; Linnea Deb; Stig Rästa; Victor Crone
Zetod feat. Hellika	"Kipõ-kipõ"	Artur Linnus; Jaanus Viskar; Jalmar Vabarna; Martin Kütt; Matis Leima

==== Final ====
The final will take place on 30 January 2027.
