= Estonia in the Eurovision Song Contest 2009 =

- Eurovision Song Contest 2009
- Participating broadcaster: Eesti Rahvusringhääling (ERR)
- Country: Estonia
- Selection process: Eesti Laul 2009
- Selection date: 7 March 2009

Competing entry
- Song: "Rändajad"
- Artist: Urban Symphony
- Songwriters: Sven Lõhmus

Placement
- Semi-final result: Qualified (3rd, 115 points)
- Final result: 6th, 129 points

Participation chronology

Estonia was represented at the Eurovision Song Contest 2009 with the song "Rändajad", written by Sven Lõhmus, and performed by the group Urban Symphony. The Estonian participating broadcaster, Eesti Rahvusringhääling (ERR), organised the national final Eesti Laul 2009 in order to select its entry for the contest. Ten songs competed in the national final and the winner was selected over two rounds of voting. In the first round, a jury panel and a public vote selected the top two to qualify to the superfinal. In the superfinal, "Rändajad" performed by Urban Symphony was selected as the winner entirely by a public vote.

Estonia was drawn to compete in the second semi-final of the Eurovision Song Contest which took place on 14 May 2009. Performing during the show in position 18, "Rändajad" was announced among the 10 qualifying entries of the second semi-final and therefore qualified to compete in the final on 16 May. This marked the first time that Estonia qualified to the final of the Eurovision Song Contest from a semi-final since the introduction of semi-finals in 2004. It was later revealed that Estonia placed third out of the 19 participating countries in the semi-final with 115 points. In the final, Estonia performed in position 15 and placed sixth out of the 25 participating countries, scoring 129 points.

== Background ==
Prior to the 2009 contest, Eesti Televisioon (ETV) until 2007, and Eesti Rahvusringhääling (ERR) in 2008, had participated in the Eurovision Song Contest representing Estonia fourteen times since ETV's first entry in 1994, winning the contest on one occasion: in 2001 with the song "Everybody" performed by Tanel Padar, Dave Benton, and 2XL. Following the introduction of semi-finals for the 2004 contest, Estonia had, to this point, failed to qualify to the final on each occasion; in 2008, "Leto svet" performed by Kreisiraadio placed eighteenth in the semi-final, their fifth consecutive non-qualification.

As part of its duties as participating broadcaster, ERR organised the selection of its entry in the Eurovision Song Contest and broadcast the event in the country. Despite Estonian Minister of Culture Laine Jänes announcing in August 2008 a possible boycott to be held between the three Baltic states due to the Russian participation in the 2008 South Ossetia war in Georgia, ERR confirmed its participation at the 2009 contest on 17 September 2008 based on the results of a public poll in September 2008 in favour of participating in the Eurovision Song Contest. Since their debut, the Estonian broadcaster has organised national finals that feature a competition among multiple artists and songs in order to select its entry for the Eurovision Song Contest. The Eurolaul competition has been organised since 1993, however on 14 October 2008, ERR announced the introduction of the newly formed Eesti Laul competition in order to select its 2009 entry.

== Before Eurovision ==
=== Eesti Laul 2009 ===
The logo of Eesti Laul 2009

Eesti Laul 2009 was the first edition of the Estonian national selection Eesti Laul, organised by ERR to select its entry for the Eurovision Song Contest 2009. The competition consisted of a ten-song final on 7 March 2009, broadcast on ETV, via radio on Raadio 2 with commentary by Madis Kimmel and Margus Kamlat as well as streamed online at the broadcaster's official website err.ee and the official Eurovision Song Contest website eurovision.tv.

==== Competing entries ====
On 14 October 2008, ERR opened the submission period for artists and composers to submit their entries up until 8 December 2008. All artists and composers were required to have Estonian citizenship or be a permanent resident of Estonia. 110 submissions were received by the deadline. An 11-member jury panel selected 10 finalists from the submissions and the selected songs were announced during the ETV entertainment program Paar on 11 December 2008. The selection jury consisted of Timo Steiner (composer), Owe Petersell (Raadio Elmar chief editor), Siim Nestor (music critic), Toomas Puna (Raadio Sky+ program director), Erik Morna (Raadio 2 head of music), Ingrid Kohtla (Tallinn Music Week organiser), Kaupo Karelson (television producer), Valner Valme (music critic), Sten Sheripov (composer), Koit Raudsepp (Raadio 2 presenter) and Helen Sildna (Tallinn Music Week organiser).

Among the competing artists were previous Eurovision Song Contest entrants Laura, who represented Estonia in 2005 as part of the group Suntribe, and Lowry, who represented Estonia in 2001 as member of 2XL together with Tanel Padar and Dave Benton. Ithaka Maria, Kaire Vilgats, Lowry, Rolf Junior, and Traffic have all competed in previous editions of Eurolaul, the national final used between 1993 and 2008. One of the initially selected acts, Popidiot, was disqualified from the competition due to violation of the rules and replaced with the song "Rändajad" performed by Urban Symphony.

Artist	Song	Songwriter(s)
Chalice and Maagiline kuues	"Nelikümmend"	Jarek Kasar
Ithaka Maria	"One Last Dance"	Pearu Paulus; Ilmar Laisaar; Alar Kotkas; Marya Roxx
Janne Saar	"I Am Too Good for You"	Vahur Valgmaa; Janne Saar
Köök and Kaire Vilgats	"Üürnik"	Jaan Pehk; Madis Aesma
Laura	"Destiny"	Sven Lõhmus
Lowry	"You Ain't What I Need"	Lauri Pihlap
Rolf Junior	"Fre:dom"	Rolf Roosalu; Maian Kärmas
StereoChemistry	"Öösiti kõndides"	Holger Tilk
Traffic	"See päev"	Stig Rästa; Fred Krieger
Urban Symphony	"Rändajad"	Sven Lõhmus

==== Final ====
The final took place on 7 March 2009 at the ERR studios in Tallinn, hosted by Henry Kõrvits and Robert Kõrvits. Ten songs competed during the show and the winner was selected over two rounds of voting. In the first round, a jury (50%) and public televote (50%) determined the top two entries to proceed to the superfinal. The public vote in the first round registered 22,809 votes. In the superfinal, "Rändajad" performed by Urban Symphony was selected as the winner entirely by a public televote. The public televote in the superfinal registered 26,475 votes. The jury panel that voted in the first round of the final consisted of Anne Erm (composer), Jaanus Nõgisto (musician), Birgit Õigemeel (singer), Siim Nestor (music critic), Mare Väljataga (singer), Owe Petersell (Raadio Elmar chief editor), Helen Sildna (Tallinn Music Week organiser), Ardo Ran Varres (composer), Marju Kuut (singer), Erik Morna (Raadio 2 head of music) and Jaagup Kreem (musician).

Final – 7 March 2009
R/O	Artist	Song	Jury		Televote		Total	Place
R/O	Artist	Song	Votes	Points	Votes	Points	Total	Place
1	Lowry	"You Ain't What I Need"	64	6	1,451	8	14	4
2	Janne Saar	"I Am Too Good for You"	64	8	846	4	12	5
3	StereoChemistry	"Öösiti kõndides"	50	2	360	1	3	10
4	Urban Symphony	"Rändajad"	78	10	7,734	9	19	1
5	Chalice and Maagiline kuues	"Nelikümmend"	61	3	852	5	8	7
6	Köök and Kaire Vilgats	"Üürnik"	62	4	534	2	6	9
7	Rolf Junior	"Fre:dom"	33	1	1,013	6	7	8
8	Traffic	"See päev"	67	9	1,275	7	16	2
9	Ithaka Maria	"One Last Dance"	64	7	778	3	10	6
10	Laura	"Destiny"	62	5	7,966	10	15	3

Detailed Jury Votes
R/O	Song	A. Erm	J. Nõgisto	B. Õigemeel	S. Nestor	M. Väljataga	O. Petersell	H. Sildna	A. R. Varres	M. M. Kuut	E. Morna	J. Kreem	Total
1	"You Ain't What I Need"	3	8	7	5	6	7	8	5	9	2	4	64
2	"I Am Too Good for You"	2	2	4	8	8	9	1	4	10	10	6	64
3	"Öösiti kõndides"	1	5	3	3	3	1	9	10	1	7	7	50
4	"Rändajad"	10	7	6	6	9	10	3	2	6	9	10	78
5	"Nelikümmend"	4	3	10	7	10	5	5	7	5	4	1	61
6	"Üürnik"	5	1	1	9	7	6	10	8	4	6	5	62
7	"Fre:dom"	7	4	5	4	1	2	2	3	2	1	2	33
8	"See päev"	8	9	2	10	4	3	6	6	7	3	9	67
9	"One Last Dance"	6	10	8	2	2	4	7	9	3	5	8	64
10	"Destiny"	9	6	9	1	5	8	4	1	8	8	3	62

Superfinal – 7 March 2009
R/O	Artist	Song	Televote	Place
1	Urban Symphony	"Rändajad"	21,710	1
2	Traffic	"See päev"	4,765	2

== At Eurovision ==
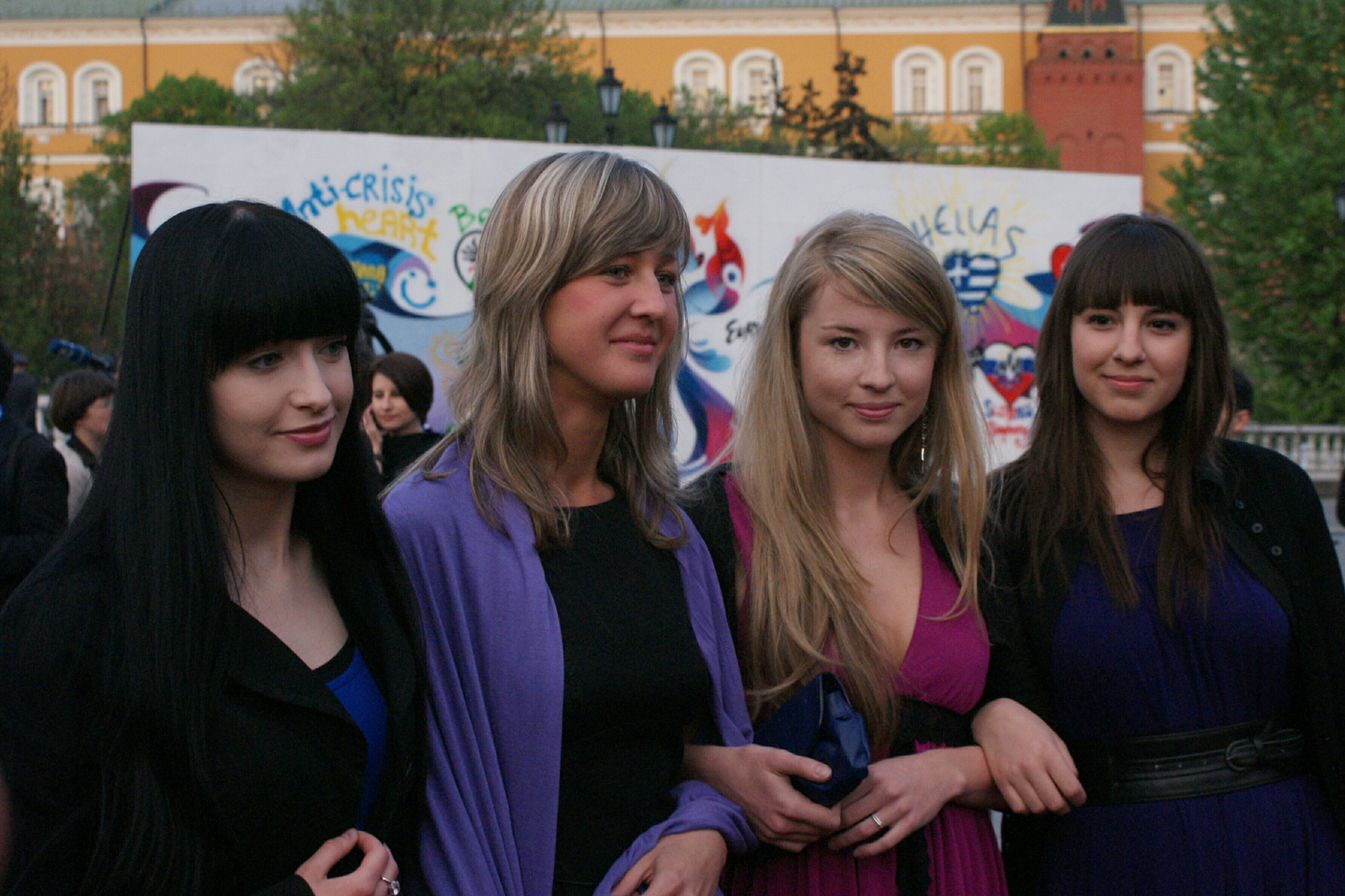
Urban Symphony at the Eurovision Opening Party in Moscow

According to Eurovision rules, all nations with the exceptions of the host country and the "Big Four" (France, Germany, Spain, and the United Kingdom) are required to qualify from one of two semi-finals in order to compete for the final; the top nine songs from each semi-final as determined by televoting progress to the final, and a tenth was determined by back-up juries. The European Broadcasting Union (EBU) split up the competing countries into six different pots based on voting patterns from previous contests, with countries with favourable voting histories put into the same pot. On 30 January 2009, an allocation draw was held which placed each country into one of the two semi-finals. Estonia was placed into the second semi-final, to be held on 14 May 2009. The running order for the semi-finals was decided through another draw on 16 March 2009 and Estonia was set to perform in position 18, following the entry from Ukraine and before the entry from the Netherlands.

The two semi-finals and the final were broadcast in Estonia on ETV with commentary by Marko Reikop and Olav Osolin. ERR appointed Laura, who represented Estonia in 2005 as part of the group Suntribe, as its spokesperson to announce the Estonian votes during the final.

=== Semi-final ===
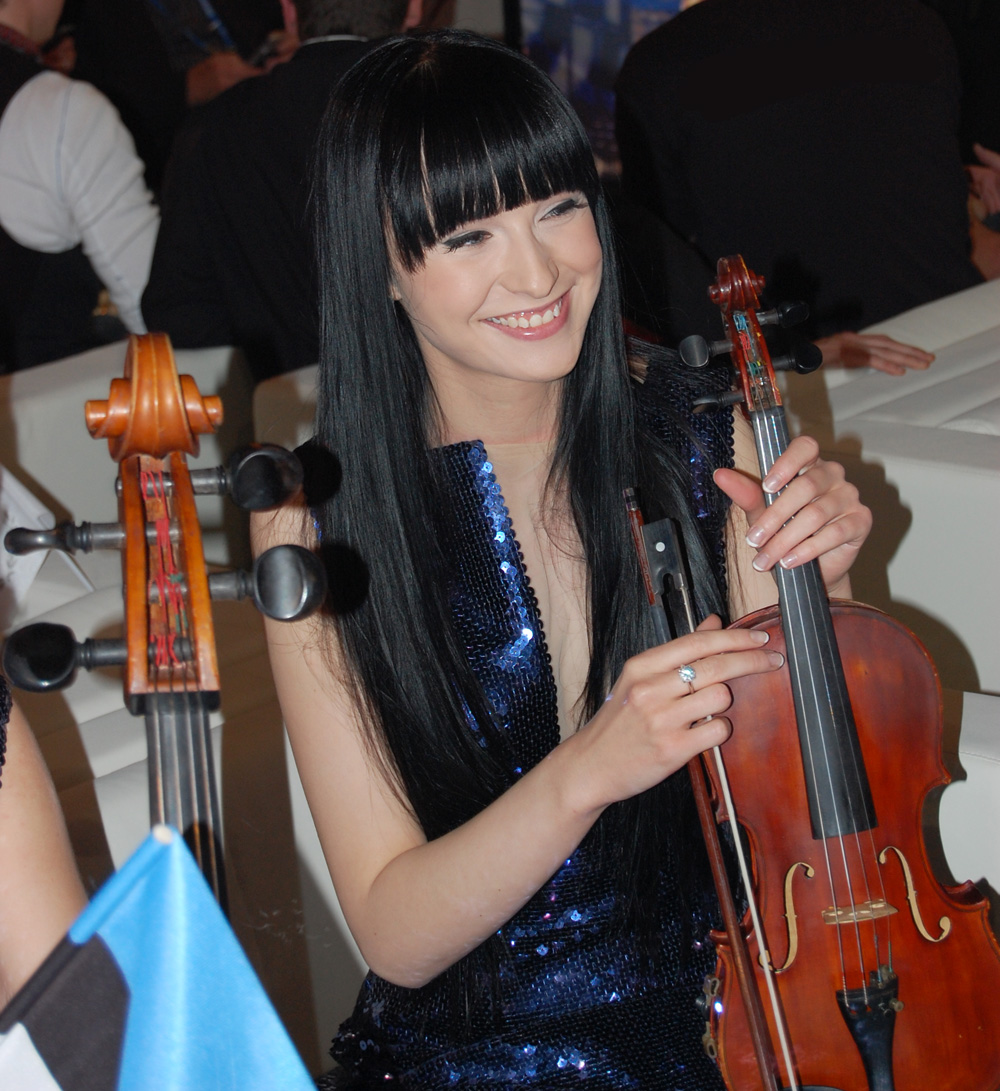
Lead singer of Urban Symphony, Sandra Nurmsalu, during the second semi-final

Urban Symphony took part in technical rehearsals on 6 and 10 May, followed by dress rehearsals on 13 and 14 May. The Estonian performance featured the members of Urban Symphony performing on stage which displayed black colours with turquoise outlines and images of a night sky and star constellation appearing on the LED screens. The lead singer of Urban Symphony, Sandra Nurmsalu, was in a dress with violet spangles. The performance also featured smoke effects and the use of a wind machine. The members of Urban Symphony were joined by two backing vocalists: Marilin Kongo and Mirjam Mesak.

At the end of the show, Estonia was announced as having finished in the top 10 and subsequently qualifying for the grand final. This marked the first time that Estonia qualified to the final of the Eurovision Song Contest from a semi-final since the introduction of semi-finals in 2004. It was later revealed that Estonia placed 3rd in the semi-final, receiving a total of 115 points.

=== Final ===
Shortly after the second semi-final, a winners' press conference was held for the ten qualifying countries. As part of this press conference, the qualifying artists took part in a draw to determine the running order for the final. This draw was done in the order the countries appeared in the semi-final running order. Estonia was drawn to perform in position 15, following the entry from Malta and before the entry from Denmark.

Urban Symphony once again took part in dress rehearsals on 15 and 16 May before the final, including the jury final where the professional juries cast their final votes before the live show. The members of Urban Symphony performed a repeat of their semi-final performance during the final on 16 May. At the conclusion of the voting, Estonia finished in sixth place with 129 points.

=== Voting ===
The voting system for 2009 involved each country awarding points from 1-8, 10 and 12, with the points in the final being decided by a combination of 50% national jury and 50% televoting. Each nation's jury consisted of five music industry professionals who are citizens of the country they represent. This jury judged each entry based on: vocal capacity; the stage performance; the song's composition and originality; and the overall impression by the act. In addition, no member of a national jury was permitted to be related in any way to any of the competing acts in such a way that they cannot vote impartially and independently.

Following the release of the full split voting by the EBU after the conclusion of the competition, it was revealed that Estonia had placed sixth with the public televote and fifth with the jury vote in the final. In the public vote, Estonia scored 129 points, while with the jury vote, Estonia scored 124 points.

Below is a breakdown of points awarded to Estonia and awarded by Estonia in the second semi-final and grand final of the contest, and the breakdown of the jury voting and televoting conducted during the two shows:

==== Points awarded to Estonia ====
Points awarded to Estonia (Semi-final 2)
Score	Country
12 points	Latvia
10 points	
8 points	France; Lithuania; Norway; Poland; Slovakia
7 points	Hungary; Moldova; Ukraine
6 points	Russia
5 points	Cyprus; Netherlands
4 points	Croatia; Denmark; Greece; Ireland; Serbia
3 points	Azerbaijan
2 points	Spain
1 point	Slovenia

Points awarded to Estonia (Final)
Score	Country
12 points	Finland; Slovakia
10 points	Iceland; Latvia; Lithuania
8 points	Poland; Russia
7 points	Moldova; Sweden
6 points	Croatia; Hungary; Ireland
5 points	Denmark; Greece
4 points	Azerbaijan; Belarus; Ukraine
3 points	Cyprus
2 points	
1 point	Germany; Romania

==== Points awarded by Estonia ====
Points awarded by Estonia (Semi-final 2)
Score	Country
12 points	Norway
10 points	Azerbaijan
8 points	Denmark
7 points	Lithuania
6 points	Cyprus
5 points	Greece
4 points	Ireland
3 points	Ukraine
2 points	Moldova
1 point	Latvia

Points awarded by Estonia (Final)
Score	Country
12 points	Norway
10 points	Russia
8 points	Iceland
7 points	Azerbaijan
6 points	Sweden
5 points	Israel
4 points	Finland
3 points	Portugal
2 points	Lithuania
1 point	Albania

==== Detailed voting results ====
The following members comprised the Estonian jury:

- Owe Petersell – Raadio Elmar chief editor
- Lea Liitmaa – singer
- Heidy Tamme – singer
- Elmar Liitmaa – songwriter, guitarist
- Ivan Makarov – Raadio 4 music editor

Detailed voting results from Estonia (Final)
R/O	Country	Results			Points
R/O	Country	Jury	Televoting	Combined	Points
01	Lithuania		5	5	2
02	Israel	7		7	5
03	France		3	3	
04	Sweden	3	4	7	6
05	Croatia				
06	Portugal	6		6	3
07	Iceland	12	7	19	8
08	Greece				
09	Armenia				
10	Russia	10	10	20	10
11	Azerbaijan	1	8	9	7
12	Bosnia and Herzegovina				
13	Moldova				
14	Malta				
15	Estonia				
16	Denmark		2	2	
17	Germany	2		2	
18	Turkey	4		4	
19	Albania	5		5	1
20	Norway	8	12	20	12
21	Ukraine				
22	Romania				
23	United Kingdom		1	1	
24	Finland		6	6	4
25	Spain				
