= Nurmsalu =

Family name

Nurmsalu is an Estonian surname. Notable people with the surname include:

- Kaarel Nurmsalu (born 1991), Estonian ski jumper and Nordic combined skier
- Laura Nurmsalu (born 1994), Estonian recurve archer
- Sandra Nurmsalu (born 1988), Estonian singer and violinist
