= Alavere, Harju County =

Village in Estonia

Alavere
- Village
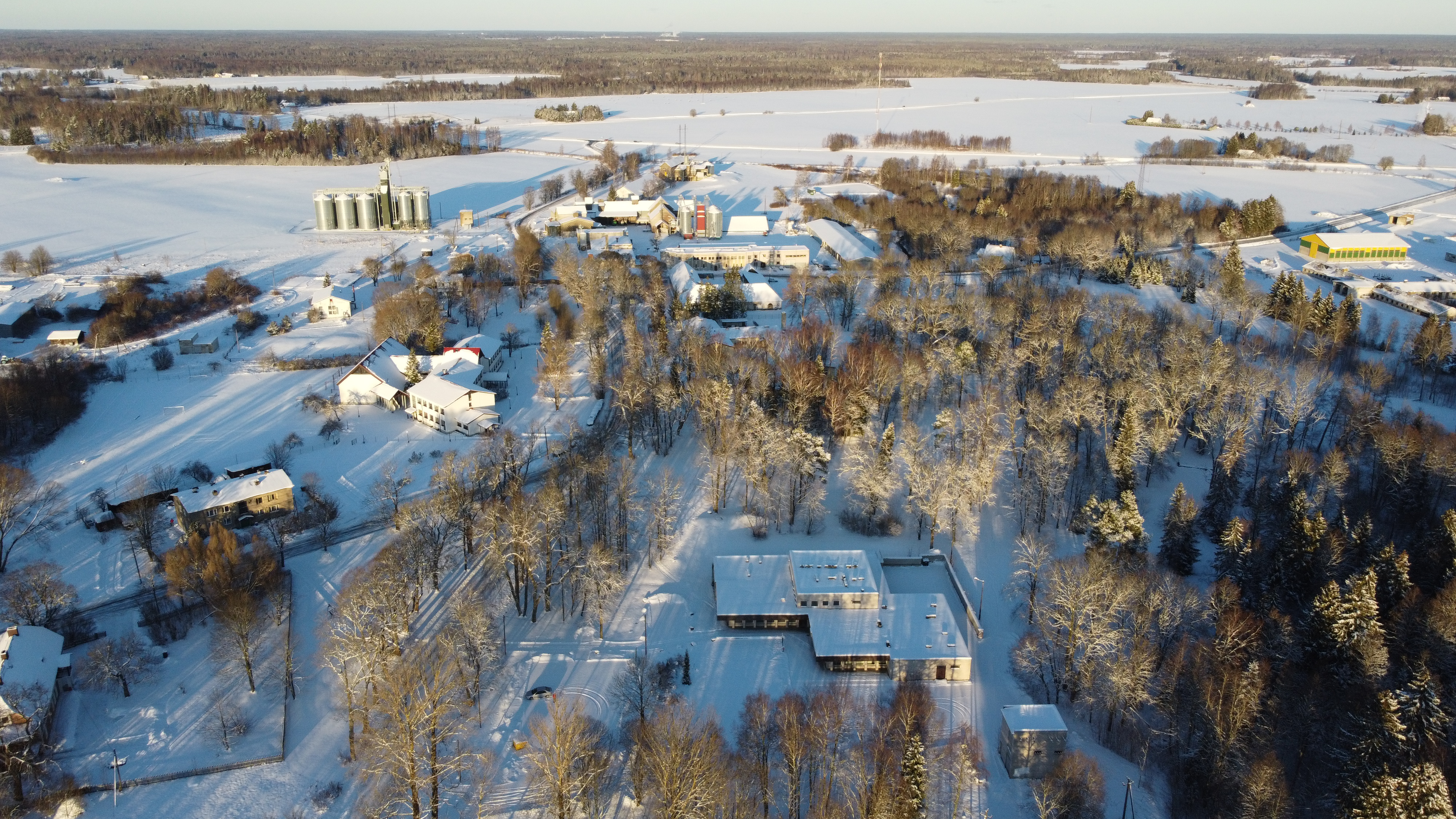

- Location in Estonia
- Coordinates: 59°14′43″N 25°19′35″E
- Country: Estonia
- County: Harju County
- Municipality: Anija Parish

Population (2019)
  - Total: 345
- Time zone: UTC+2 (EET)
  - Summer (DST): UTC+3 (EEST)
- Postal code: 74401
- Geocode: 1184

Drone video of Alavere in January 2022

Alavere is a village in Anija Parish, Harju County in northern Estonia. The population was 345 in 2019.

== History ==
Alavere was first mentioned in 1241 in the Liber Census Daniæ, during the reign of King Valdemar II of Denmark, as Hauaueeræ. The village center of present-day was built up around a manor house, dating from the 1620s. The Allafer Manor (Estonian: Alavere mõis) of the former Kose Parish passed between the hands of several families throughout the centuries, notably the Baltic German Löwensterns in the 18th century and the Ungern-Sternbergs in the 19th century. The main building of the mansion, built by Baron Gregor von Ungern-Sternberg in 1852, was heavily damaged by local peasants during the 1905 Revolution but was rebuilt. The last individual owner of nobility was Mary von der Pahlen, who acquired it in 1907. During the Estonian Land Reform in 1919, the manor's lands were nationalized. The new owner of the manor house demolished the structure in 1938, with the granite stones brought to Tallinn to be reused in buildings there. During the Soviet era, Alavere was part of the Kose Village Council and was the site of 7,700 hectare state farm.

== Geography ==
The village is located in northern Estonia, in western Harju County. It lies 10.30 kilometres (6.40 mi) south of the town of Kehra, the seat of the municipality. Tallinn is 39.62 kilometres (24.62 mi) to the northwest.

== Demographics ==
As of the 2011 census, there were 339 people. Of the total residents, 22.4% were under the age of 18; 67.8% were between the ages of 18 and 64; and 9.7% were 65 years of age or older. The gender makeup of the village was 48.4% male and 51.6% female.

== Transportation ==
The village lies along the Estonian national road T12. The nearest railway station is 10.30 kilometres (6.40 mi) away in Kehra, which links to Tallinn and Tartu.

== Notable people ==
- Sandra Nurmsalu, the musician and former Urban Symphony lead singer who represented Estonia at Eurovision 2009, was raised in Alavere
- Jakob Mändmets, the Estonian writer and journalist, taught at the village school from 1892 to 1902

== Points of interest ==
- A historic settlement site in the vicinity is registered and protected as an archaeological monument
