= Päikese poole =

2009 song by Urban Symphony

Single by Urban Symphony
- Released: July 24, 2009
- Recorded: 2009
- Genre: electropop
- Length: 3:26
- Label: Moonwalk
- Producer: Sven Lõhmus

Urban Symphony singles chronology
"Rändajad" (2009)	"Päikese poole" (2009)	"Skorpion" (2010)

"Päikese poole" (English: Towards the Sun) is the second single by the Estonian band Urban Symphony. The song premiered on 22 July 2009 in the Estonian radio Star FM. The track is composed by Sven Lõhmus. It was released digitally on 24 July 2009.

== Track listing ==
1. "Päikese poole" – 3:26

== Chart positions ==
Chart (2009)	Peak position
Estonian Airplay Chart	12
