= Sandra Nurmsalu =

Estonian musician (born 1988)

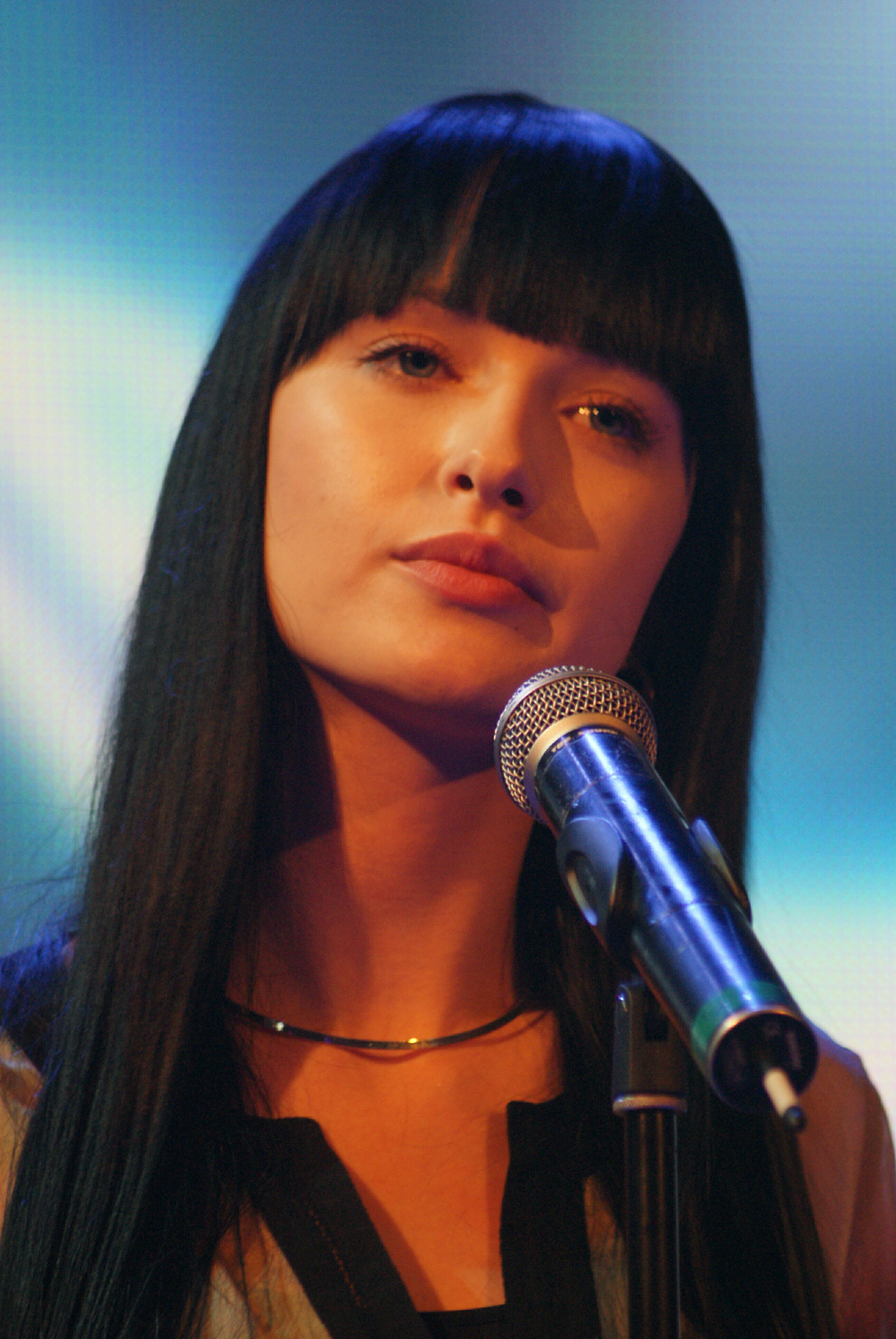
- Nurmsalu performing in Moscow in 2009
- Born: 6 December 1988 (age 37); Alavere, then part of Estonian SSR, Soviet Union
- Occupations: Singer; songwriter; violinist
- Partner: Tarmo Kask (2004–present)
- Children: 4
- Musical career
- Genres: Baroque pop; alternative; electropop; world; classical crossover
- Instruments: Vocals; violin
- Years active: 2007–present
- Labels: Moonwalk; Muusikalind
- Website: sandranurmsalu.com

Sandra Nurmsalu (born 6 December 1988) is an Estonian singer, songwriter, and violinist. Recognized within Estonia for her genre-bending style, Nurmsalu has garnered success as both the lead singer of Urban Symphony and as a solo artist.

Nurmsalu rose to prominence in Estonia during her participation in the 2007 edition of the Eesti Televisioon (ETV) talent competition Kaks takti ette. While competing on the show, she formed the band Urban Symphony, of which she became the lead singer from 2007 to 2010. With Urban Symphony, Nurmsalu won Eesti Laul 2009 and represented Estonia in the Eurovision Song Contest 2009 in Moscow with the song "Rändajad", placing sixth. After Eurovision, Nurmsalu competed in Eesti Laul twice more as a soloist: in 2014 and 2019, placing as a finalist both times.

== Early life and education ==
Nurmsalu was born on 6 December 1988 in Alavere, a small village in Harju County. She began experimenting with music as a student at a music school in Kose, where she learned how to play the violin. In her youth, Nurmsalu sang with the Kose-based children's folk group Pillipiigad for seven years, and then later the folk group Virre for three years.

As a teenager, she was a member of the Estonian three-piece girl group Pink Tank. Nurmsalu attended Georg Ots Music School in Tallinn, graduating in 2008.

== Career ==
=== 2007–2008: Kaks takti ette and formation of Urban Symphony ===
Nurmsalu began her professional solo career in 2007, competing in the Eesti Televisioon (ETV) singing competition Kaks takti ette. During a special week of the competition where contestants were told their performances must be as part of an ensemble, Nurmsalu formed the group Urban Symphony with other stringed instrument musicians from her music school. The group's performance of "Hungry" by Kosheen blended classical crossover with electronic music; this sound became associated with Urban Symphony and Nurmsalu for the rest of their careers. Nurmsalu ultimately placed fourth in Kaks takti ette.

Following the competition, Nurmsalu was signed by Estonian songwriter and record producer Sven Lõhmus to his record label Moonwalk Records.

=== 2009–2011: Further success, Eurovision, and hiatus ===
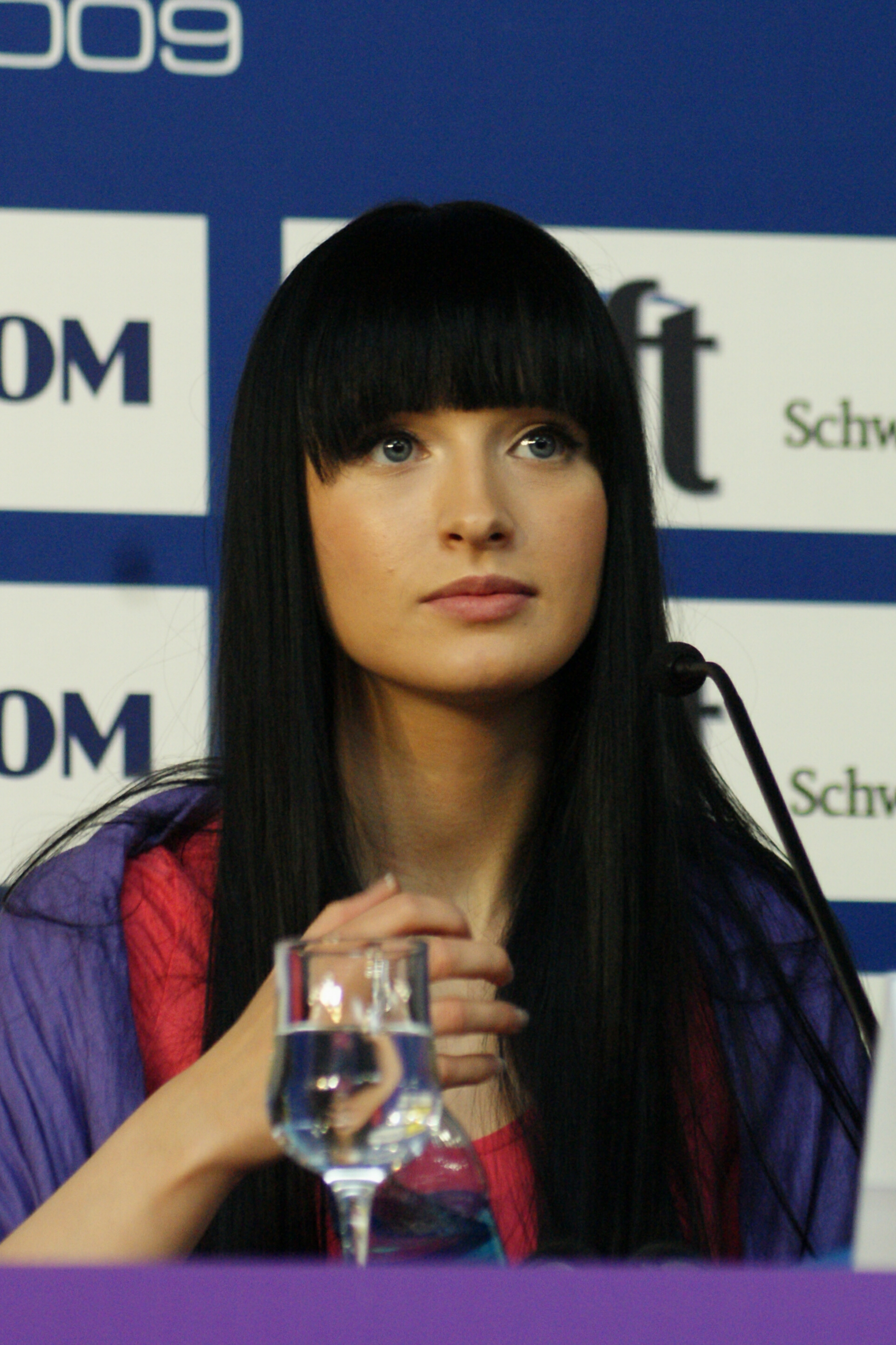
Nurmsalu at a press conference for the Eurovision Song Contest 2009 in Moscow.

After signing to Moonwalk shortly after Kaks takti ette, Nurmsalu and Lõhmus decided that she would continue performing with Urban Symphony instead of pursuing a solo career. In December 2008, Urban Symphony was revealed to be taking part in the debut edition of Eesti Laul, the newly created program to select the Estonian representative in the Eurovision Song Contest. Their entry in the competition, "Rändajad", also served as their debut single as a group and was released on 5 January 2009; the song was written and produced by Lõhmus. Urban Symphony competed in the final of Eesti Laul 2009 on 7 March 2009, where they were ranked first by the professional jury and second by the Estonian public. As one of the top two total vote-getters, they advanced to the superfinal with Traffic. In the superfinal, Urban Symphony and "Rändajad" received over 82% of the votes cast, winning the competition and holding the record for the biggest win margin in Eesti Laul history.

As the winners of Eesti Laul, Urban Symphony received the right to represent Estonia in the Eurovision Song Contest 2009 in Moscow, with "Rändajad". They competed in the second semi-final on 14 May 2009, placing third and qualifying to the final; this was the first time Estonia had qualified to the finals since the introduction of the semi-finals in 2004, and remains their best placement in the semi-finals of all-time. They later performed in the finals on 16 May, where they placed sixth with 129 points; this was the best result for Estonia since their third place finish at the Eurovision Song Contest 2002, and continues to be their best result since then as of 2026.

After Eurovision, "Rändajad" became a successful single internationally; it reached the top ten in Estonia, Finland, and Greece, the top twenty in Sweden, and also charted in Belgium, Switzerland, and the United Kingdom. Later that year, Nurmsalu was invited to perform as a special guest during season three of Eesti otsib superstaari, the Estonian version of Idols, performing "Rändajad" with eventual winner Ott Lepland during celebrity duets week; Lepland would later go on to represent Estonia in the Eurovision Song Contest 2012, placing sixth in the final as well. Urban Symphony released two other singles in their career, "Päikese poole" and "Skorpion"; both of which peaked in the top ten in Estonia.

In 2010, Urban Symphony announced that they would be disbanding. The announcement was due to Nurmsalu wishing to prioritize motherhood, while the group's other members wished to continue their studies and pursue other interests.

=== 2012–present: Solo career ===
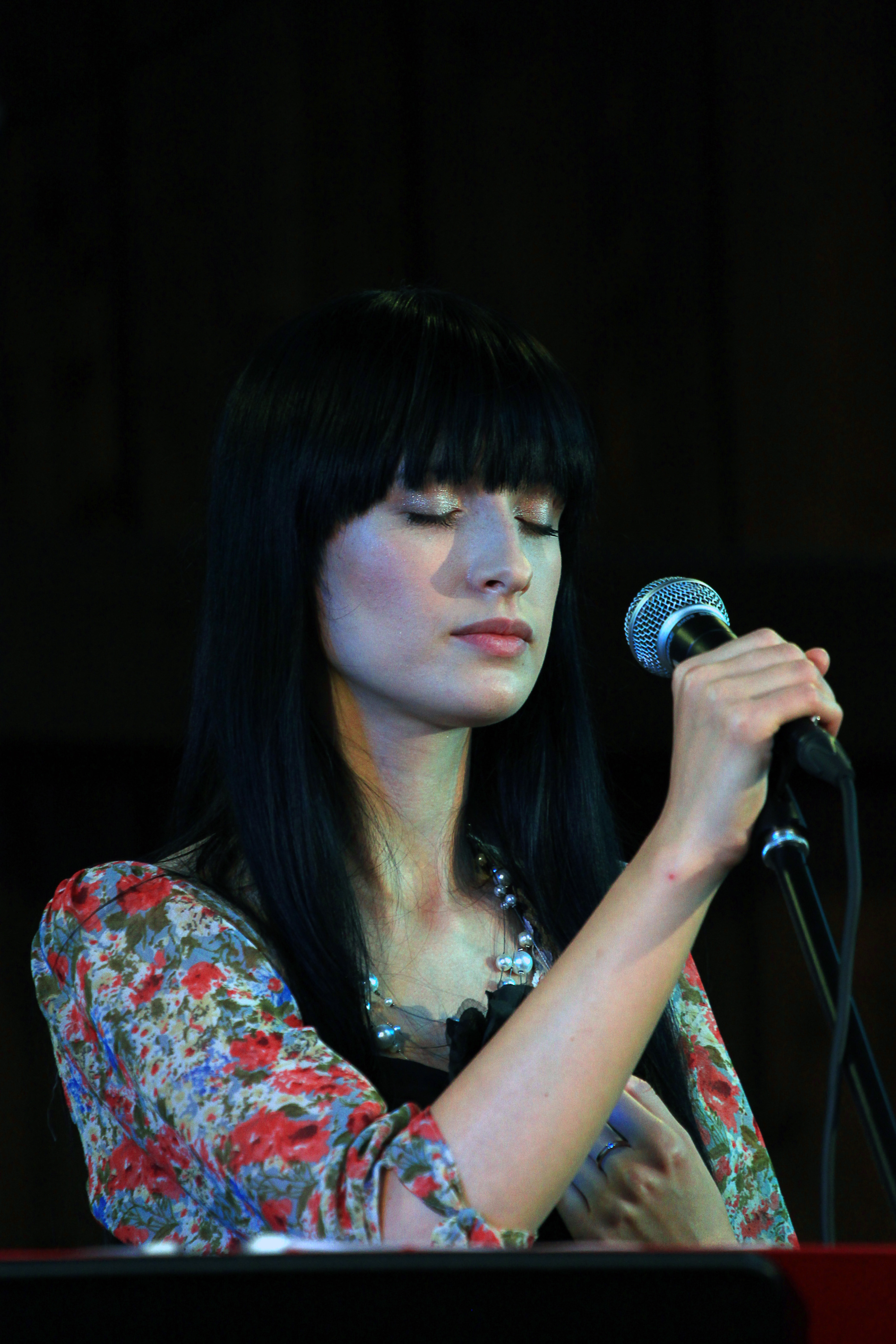
Nurmsalu performing in Tartu in 2013.

After a two-year hiatus in order to prioritize raising her child, Nurmsalu returned to music in 2012. She performed guest vocals on the single "Sel teel" by Estonian musician Sinine; the song went on to become a top ten hit in Estonia, and also received airplay in France and Germany. Nurmsalu later began performing traditional Estonian folk songs at various musical events and festivals throughout Estonia. In October 2012, Nurmsalu went on tour alongside several other Estonian musicians to celebrate 100 years of Estonian film and music, performing concerts at venues in Tallinn, Pärnu, and Tartu. Later that year, Nurmsalu announced the Rändajad concert tour. The tour played at several small venues in Harju County, where Nurmsalu was raised, including her hometown of Alavere.

In December 2012, to coincide with her return to the music industry, Nurmsalu formed her own record label Muusikalind to promote her music. In 2013, Nurmsalu performed at the Estonian musical concert Öölaulupidu Järjepidevus where she debuted her first original single since returning to music, "Väike Eestimaa". On 26 September 2013, "Väike Eestimaa" was officially released by Moonwalk Studios and included an announcement that Nurmsalu was working on a new album with her former producer Lõhmus.

In December 2013, Nurmsalu was announced as one of the semi-finalists in Eesti Laul 2014 with the song "Kui tuuled pöörduvad", written by Lõhmus. This marked her first return to the competition since winning its inaugural edition in 2009 with Urban Symphony. Nurmsalu advanced from the second semi-final on 21 February 2014, to the final, held in Tallinn on 1 March. In the final, Nurmsalu placed third with the Estonian public, but second-to-last with the professional juries, placing fifth overall and not advancing to the superfinal. Nurmsalu's placement was considered a shock, as many expected her to win the competition. Despite not winning, "Kui tuuled pöörduvad" became a top five single in Estonia and Nurmsalu's highest-charting hit since "Rändajad".

After Eesti Laul, she planned to release the single "Mängurõõm" in early-2015, but the song was never released after Nurmsalu left Moonwalk Records and cut ties with her former producer Lõhmus. After leaving Moonwalk, Nurmsalu went on another hiatus from the music industry. She returned to music in 2017, releasing the singles "Jäälilled" and "Kevad on alati alles". She also developed a new working relationship with Estonian producer Priit Pajusaar. "Jäälilled" was written by Nurmsalu's partner Tarmo Kask, while "Kevad on alati alles" was written by Estonian poet Aapo Ilves; the music for both songs was composed by Nurmsalu, Pajusaar, and Pille Piir.

Nurmsalu returned to Eesti Laul once more, being announced as one of the semi-finalists for its 2019 edition in November 2018 with the song "Soovide puu"; the song became the first entry Nurmsalu had written, cowriting it with Pajusaar and Ilves. Nurmsalu qualified from the first semi-final on 31 January 2019 as a second-round qualifier; she did not receive high enough scores from the professional jury or Estonian public in the initial round, but was one of two entries saved by the public as a first semi-final wildcard. She then advanced to the final on 16 February, where she placed eighth in the competition.

== Personal life ==
Nurmsalu has been in a relationship with professional poker player Tarmo Kask since 2004. Kask is additionally a former physical education teacher, has composed songs for Nurmsalu and other musicians, and ran for leader of the Estonian Free Party. Nurmsalu and Kask have three daughters and one son.

Outside of music, Nurmsalu is an animal rights activist who advocates for the prevention of animal abuse and abandonment. She also took position against same-sex marriage, COVID restrictions and vaccination.

In September 2025, Nurmsalu joined the Conservative People's Party of Estonia. She was elected as a councillor in the 2025 Estonian municipal elections in Märjamaa, Rapla County.

== Discography ==
=== Urban Symphony ===
Title	Year	Peak chart positions							Album
Title	Year	EST	SWE	FIN	BEL (Vl)	SUI	GRE	UK	Album
"Rändajad"	2009	3	14	10	68	86	8	117	Non-album singles
"Päikese poole"	2009	12	—	—	—	—	—	—	Non-album singles
"Skorpion"	2010	11	—	—	—	—	—	—	Non-album singles
"—" denotes releases that did not chart or were not released.

=== Solo ===
Title	Year	Peak chart positions	Album
Title	Year	EST	Album
"Velvetiin"	2007	—	Non-album singles
"Sel teel" (Sinine featuring Sandra Nurmsalu)	2012	8	Non-album singles
"Väike Eestimaa"	2013	—	Non-album singles
"Kui tuuled pöörduvad"	2014	5	Non-album singles
"Aita mööda saata öö" (Sandra Nurmsalu and Margus Vaher)	2014	–	Non-album singles
"Jäälilled"	2017	—	Non-album singles
"Kevad on alati alles"	2017	—	Non-album singles
"Soovide puu"	2018	—	Non-album singles
"—" denotes releases that did not chart or were not released.

Awards and achievements
Preceded by Kreisiraadio with "Leto svet"	Estonia in the Eurovision Song Contest; 2009 (as part of Urban Symphony)	Succeeded by Malcolm Lincoln and Manpower 4 with "Siren"
