= Moonwalk Records =

Estonian record label

Moonwalk Records is a record label located in Estonia. The label was founded in 2005 and is owned by Tambet Mumma and Sven Lõhmus. They are primarily engaged in creating and selling music, developing music performers, and organizing concert tours. Since 2008, the organization has been known for producing a series of concert tours, including Muusa Puudutus, Kaunimad Jõululaulud, and a joint tour with the radio station Star FM 12 Suvevärvi. Also, Moonwalk Records MCM has offices in New York and Los Angeles.

== Notable artists ==
=== Current ===
- Getter Jaani (2010–present)
- Grete Paia (2012–present)
- Laura Põldvere (2005–present)
- Stefan Airapetjan

=== Former ===
- Mari-Leen (2005–2011)
- Sandra Nurmsalu (2008–2015)
- Suntribe (2005)
- Urban Symphony (2008–2010)
- Vanilla Ninja (2002–2003) (Note: Vanilla Ninja worked with Lõhmus prior to Moonwalk's formation in 2005, but are credited on Moonwalk's website as former artists.)
