= Sturle Dagsland =

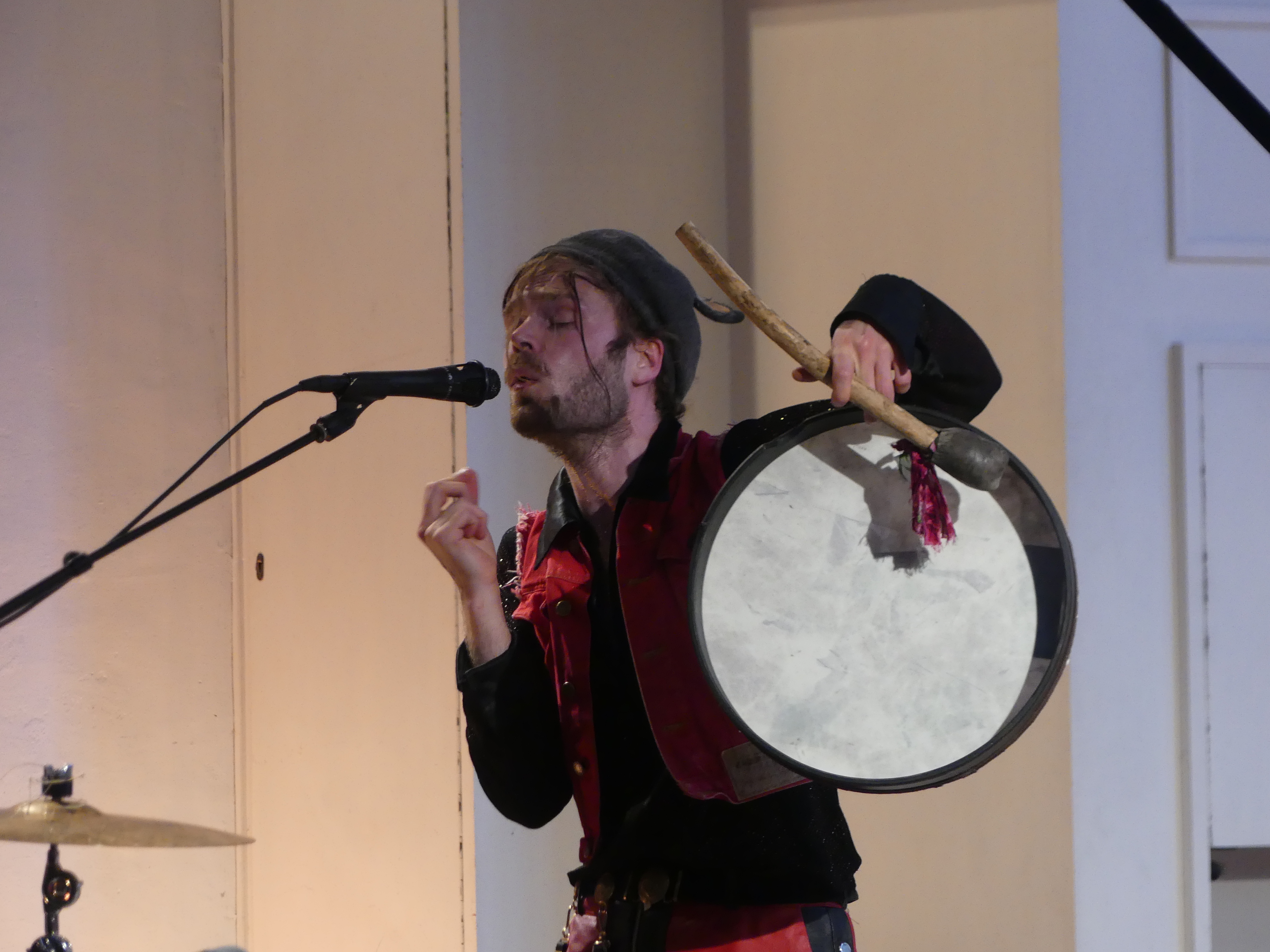
- Sturle Dagsland

Background information
- Origin: Stavanger, Norway
- Genres: Electronic, Indie, Folk, World, Alternative, Alternative rock, Avant-garde, Experimental, Pop music, Progressive rock, World music, Electronica, Jazz, singer-songwriter, Psychedelic, Ethnic music, Post-rock, Folk rock, Yoik,
- Years active: 2011–present
- Members: Sturle Dagsland; Sjur Dagsland; Carl Tomas Nising (live); Eirik O. Heggen (live)
- Website: https://www.facebook.com/sturledagsland

Sturle Dagsland is a Norwegian artist and musical outfit from Stavanger, consisting of the brothers Sturle Dagsland and Sjur Dagsland.

Sturle Dagsland won Edvardprisen Prize in 2022 from TONO alongside his brother and collaborator Sjur Dagsland for their self-titled debut album Sturle Dagsland

They have toured extensively all across the world at festivals such as G! Festival, Tallinn Music Week Secret Solstice, Sled Island, Fiestas del Pilar, Tallinn Music Week, Fusion Festival, Nyege Nyege, South by Southwest, Canadian Music Week, Oslo Jazzfestival, Iceland Airwaves, Mėnuo Juodaragis, and more. In 2015, they made their North American debut at Sled Island in Canada.

== Discography ==
=== Studio albums ===
- 2021: Sturle Dagsland
- 2025: Dreams and Conjurations
