= Marju Kuut =

Marynel-Marju Kuut
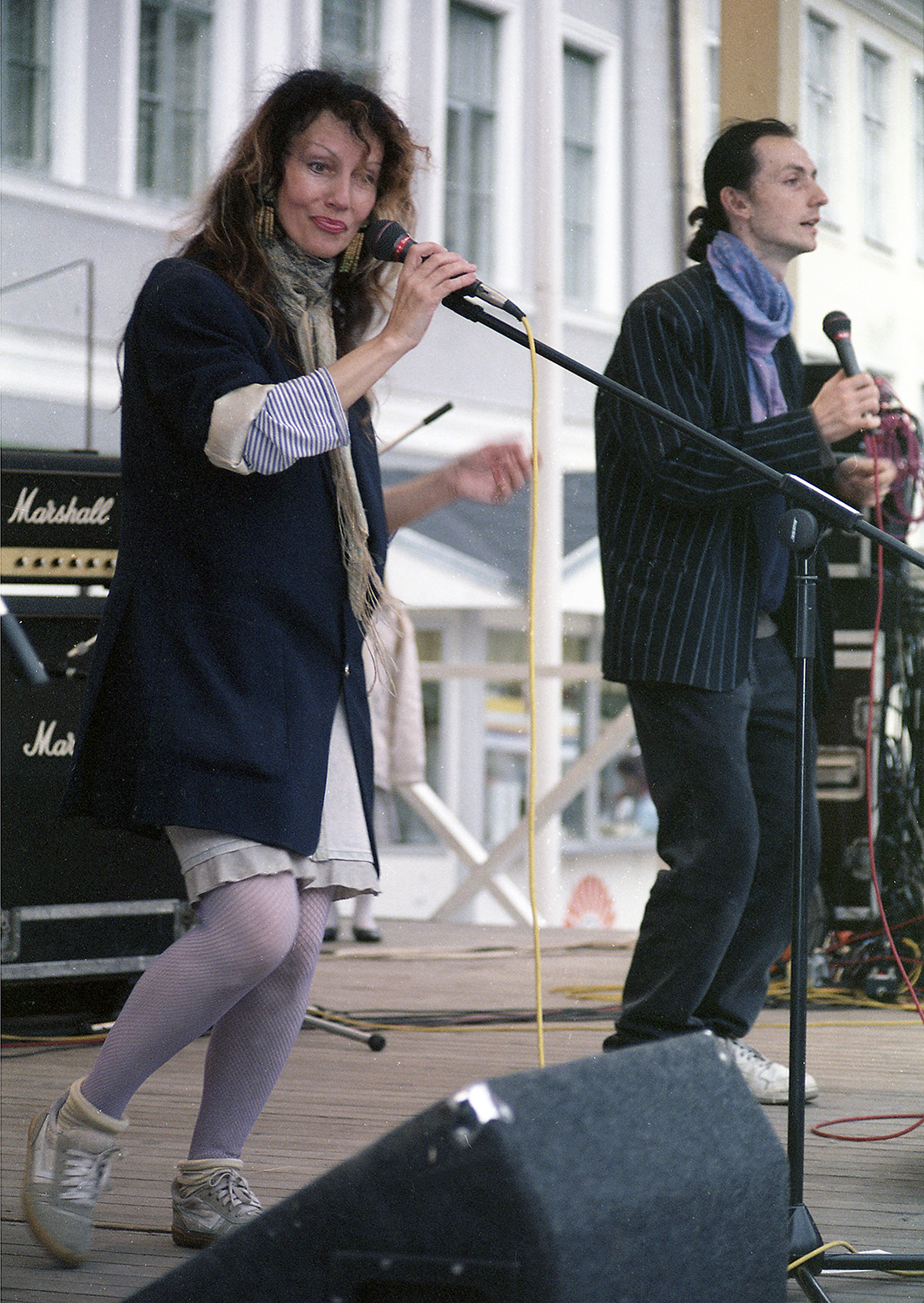
- Marju Kuut and son Uku Kuut in 1993

Background information
- Also known as: Marju Marynel Kuut, Maryn E. Coote, Marinél
- Born: Marju Kuut; 12 February 1946; Tallinn, then part of Estonian SSR, Soviet Union
- Died: 10 April 2022 (aged 76) Stockholm, Sweden
- Years active: 1964-2019
- Formerly of: MERL, MIR

Marynel-Marju Kuut (12 February 1946 – 10 April 2022) was an Estonian jazz singer and record producer.

In 1965, the jazz magazine Down Beat named her the best female jazz singer of the USSR. In the 1970s she was a singer in the ensembles MERL and MIR.

She was an artist in the Astoria, Tallinn and Viru variety shows. In 1971 she starred in the musical film Varastati Vana Toomas and also was a member of the Vanemuine theater rock opera Imelugu.

== Career ==
She was a student at Tallinn English College, Tallinn Secondary School of Science, Tallinn Evening School, Tallinn Music School and the ESSR Philharmonic Variety Show Studio, where she was instructed by composer Uno Naissoo. She learned the flute at the Tallinn Music School.

Kuut worked at restaurants and variety shows as a singer but also at the Tallinn Centre Hospital as a sanitarian, the Estonian Telegraph agency as a photocopier and as an Estonian-speaking producer for Hea Sõnum radio in Sweden.

In Autumn 1964 she participated in a young singers' competition. Aleksander Rjabov invited her to be the Estonian Radio's Easy-Listening Orchestra's soloist after the competition. The first performances happened in 1965 still with Tiit Paulus and Raivo Tammik. Marju Kuut also performed at a jazz festival in 1965 with Russian musical artists; Russian music journalists referred to her as the best jazz singer in the USSR two times in Down Beat magazine. In 1966 and 1967 she won at Kaunas Jazz Festival.

In Estonia Kuut performed in an R&B ensemble with Olav Ehala, Marje Aare, Jüri Kõrgema and others. Then she was a member of Olav Ehala's ensemble Kristallid, where Jaak Joala played the bass. She debuted with her album "Aastaajad" in 1969. She was invited into the ensemble MERL in early 1972, due to Kuut always wishing to sing live polyphonically. Later ensemble MIR evolved from MERL, now with a male voice in accordance to Ivo Linna joining.

In the late 1970s she started singing funk-rhythmic jazz, performing with Margus Kappel, Riho Lilje, Ivo Varts and others. She sang 2 songs for children's movie Nukitsamees. She emigrated to Sweden in 1980 — coming under scrutiny from the Soviet Union — and adopted the name Marynel-Marju Kuut. By then she had recorded around 500 songs at Eesti Raadio and Eesti Televisioon although some of these recordings have perished or gone missing.

Between 1981 and 1989, she worked as an Estonian-speaking producer for Hea Sõnum radio's IBRA Radio and performed many times. From 1988 until 1991, she worked with Warner Bros., recording music for young talent, composing, arranging and producing. In the years 1991–2005 she performed on ferries.

In the year 2000 she began work as a DJ (DJ-MEK) in night clubs, playing jazz, funk, dance, R&B and house music.

At the Estonian Music Award's gala in 2006, she was awarded for her lifework's contribution to Estonian music.

She played Mrs Corbie in Heikki Sarmanto's jazz operetta Manon. That same year she participated in TV3's Laulud tähtedega.

Marju Kuut ran for Tallinn City Council in 2009 in the Centre Party's list and received 10 votes.

== Personal life ==
Marju Kuut had a son Uku Kuut in 1966, from her first marriage to Ivar Krull, which lasted one and a half years. Uku Kuut died on 22 September 2017, of amyotrophic lateral sclerosis (ALS), aged 51.

Her 2-year-long relationship with pianist Rein Alango (1947–1971) ended with Alango's death due to food poisoning.

Her fictitious marriage with a Swede, which gave her the ability to emigrate, quickly came to an end after her arrival to Sweden. The man turned out to be a drug addict.

During her last decade of living, she lived a private life and seldom interacted with the media.

Kuut didn't accept the order of the White Star award, because she disagreed with the reason for the award. She found it meaningless and that it didn't truly reflect her music career. Although it was still sent to her home in Sweden.

In 2005, film director Erle Veber made a documentary about Kuut, titled Värvivalgus.

She was buried at Pärsama cemetery in Saaremaa, though she requested to be buried at Tornimäe cemetery with her son Uku.

== Filmography ==
- Maria – Varastati Vana Toomas (1971).

== Awards ==
- 2006 – Estonian Music Awards – Contribution to Estonian Music (Life's work award)
- 2021 – V class order of the White Star

== Bibliography ==
• Marju ja Uku. (Intervjuu. Marju Kuut ja Uku Kuut elust välismaal, pereelust, usust). Intervjueerija: Kalle Kurg. – Ajakiri Sina ja Mina 1992, 1, lk 26–27 ja 2, lk 20–22.
