= Traffic (Estonian band) =

Estonian musical group

- Origin: Tallinn, Estonia
- Genres: Indie folk, bluegrass, pop rock
- Years active: 2006–present
- Labels: Downtown
- Members: Silver Laas; Tõnis Kivisild; Ivo Priilinn; Robert Vaigla; Joonas Mattias Sarapuu
- Past members: Reigo Ahven; Stig Rästa
- Website: www.traffic.ee

Traffic is an Estonian band from Tallinn, Estonia, most notable for being in Eurolaul 2008 and Eesti Laul 2009, 2012, 2014, 2020, 2022 and 2024. They also have several hits in Estonia like "Sekundiga", which reached more than 5 million views on Youtube, "Für Elise/Üks kord veel", both of which are "Eesti Laul" songs.

== Beginning ==
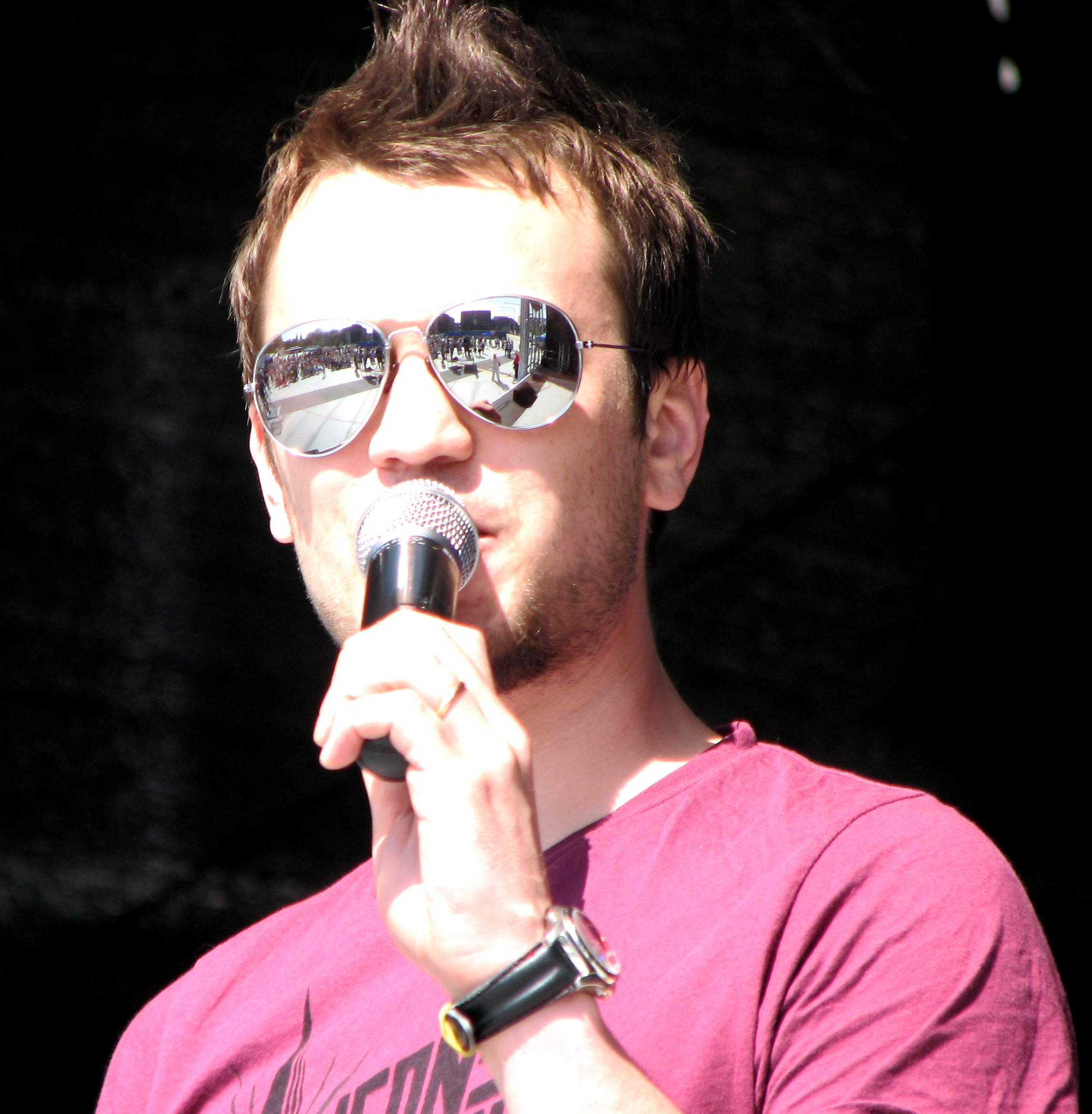
Lead vocalist Silver Laas.

The founding members of the band, singer Silver Laas and guitarist Stig Rästa (previously of the band Slobodan River) came together in 2006. Through personal connections they found other band members: bass guitarist Tõnis Kivisild, drummer Reigo Ahven, and guitarist Karl Kanter. Kanter and Ahven left the band shortly after and were replaced with guitarist Robert Vaigla (previously of the band Slide-Fifty) and drummer Ivo Priilinn.

Rästa writes most of the band's music, while the lyrics are written by different authors.

== Eurolaul and Eesti Laul participation ==
The band have participated in the Estonian selection for the Eurovision Song Contest on six occasions. Their first participation was in Eurolaul 2008, in duet with Luisa Värk, they finished 8th with the song "It's Never Too Late". A year after, they came back for Eesti Laul 2009, with their song "See päev". The song finished in the top two, and thus went to the superfinal. However, Urban Symphony's song "Randajad" won convincingly in the superfinal, receiving 82% of the vote to Traffic's 18% and leaving them in second place. This is their highest scoring entry in Eesti Laul to this date.

In Eesti Laul 2012, the band returned with their song "NASA". They qualified for the final, however ended up finishing last in the final.

Their song for Eesti Laul 2014 was named "Für Elise". They received a far better result than the one they had received in 2012, reaching third place in the final and nearly qualifying for the superfinal. Despite missing the superfinal by one point, "Für Elise" became a massive hit in Estonia, reaching more than 3 million views on Youtube, twice the size of the country's population.

They returned to Eesti Laul in 2020 with their song "Üks kord veel", coming fifth in the grand final. Despite not winning the selection, their song became a hit and was listed as one of the most successful Estonian songs of 2020 by several radios, topping even some end of the year rank.

They returned to Eesti Laul again in 2022 with their song "Kaua veel", however, they failed to qualify from the quarter-final. It is the first time the group have missed a final while participating in Eesti Laul.

In November 2023, they were announced as one of the semi-finalists of Eesti Laul 2024, with the song "Wunderbar". They did not qualify from the semi-final.

== Discography ==
=== Albums ===
- Traffic (2007)
- 2 (2008)
- Siirius (2012)

=== Singles ===
- "Kallis, ära küsi" (2006) ("Honey, Do Not Ask")
- "Vastassuunas" (2006) ("In the Opposite Direction")
- "Meie laul" (feat. Maarja-Liis Ilus; 2007) ("Our Song")
- "Päevast päeva" (2007) ("From Day to Day")
- "It's Never Too Late" (feat. Luisa Värk; Eurolaul 2008)
- "Sõnad" (2008) ("Words")
- "Kesköödisko" (2008) ("Midnight Disco")
- "Tuul" (2008/2009) ("Wind")
- "See päev" (Eesti Laul 2009) ("This Day")
- "NASA" (Eesti Laul 2012)
- "Für Elise" (Eesti Laul 2014)
- "Sekundiga" (2015)
- "Natukene veel" (2016)
- "Varjud" (with Lenna Kuurmaa, 2017)
- "Vead" (2018)
- "Ei Anna Alla" (2018)
- "Teisiti ei saa" (2019)
- "Üks kord veel" (Eesti Laul 2020)
- "Kaua Veel" (Eesti Laul 2022)
- "Wunderbar" (Eesti Laul 2024)

== See also ==
- Music of Estonia
