= Lauri Pihlap =

Estonian singer

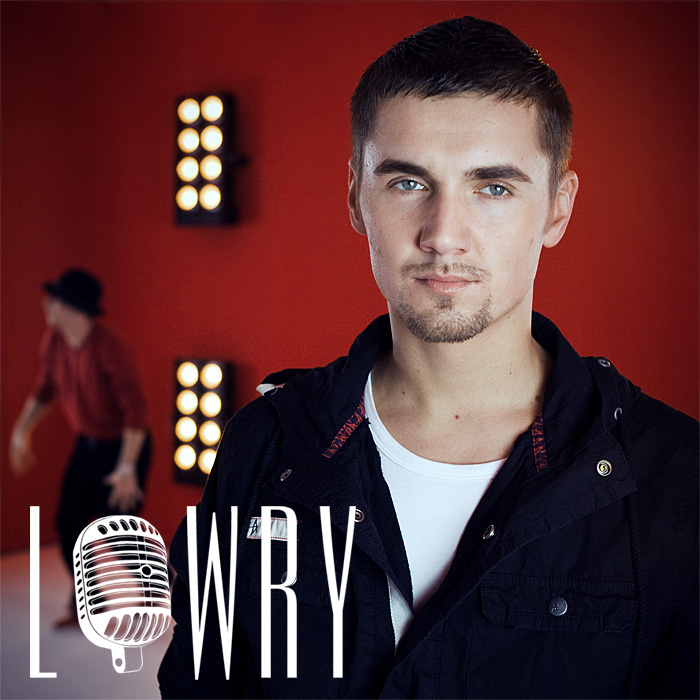
Lauri Pihlap

Lauri Pihlap (born 9 March 1982 in Tallinn) is an Estonian pop and R&B singer and hip hop artist.

In 2000, he joined the band 2XL (later Soul Militia).

In 2007, he started his solo career under the name Lowry. His debut album's name is "Split Personality" (2007). In 2009, he participated in Eesti Laul 2009, reaching the final.

He returned to Eesti Laul 2022 with the song "Take Me Home", written by himself, but failed to qualify from the quarter-final.
