= Helen Sildna =

Estonian cultural entrepreneur

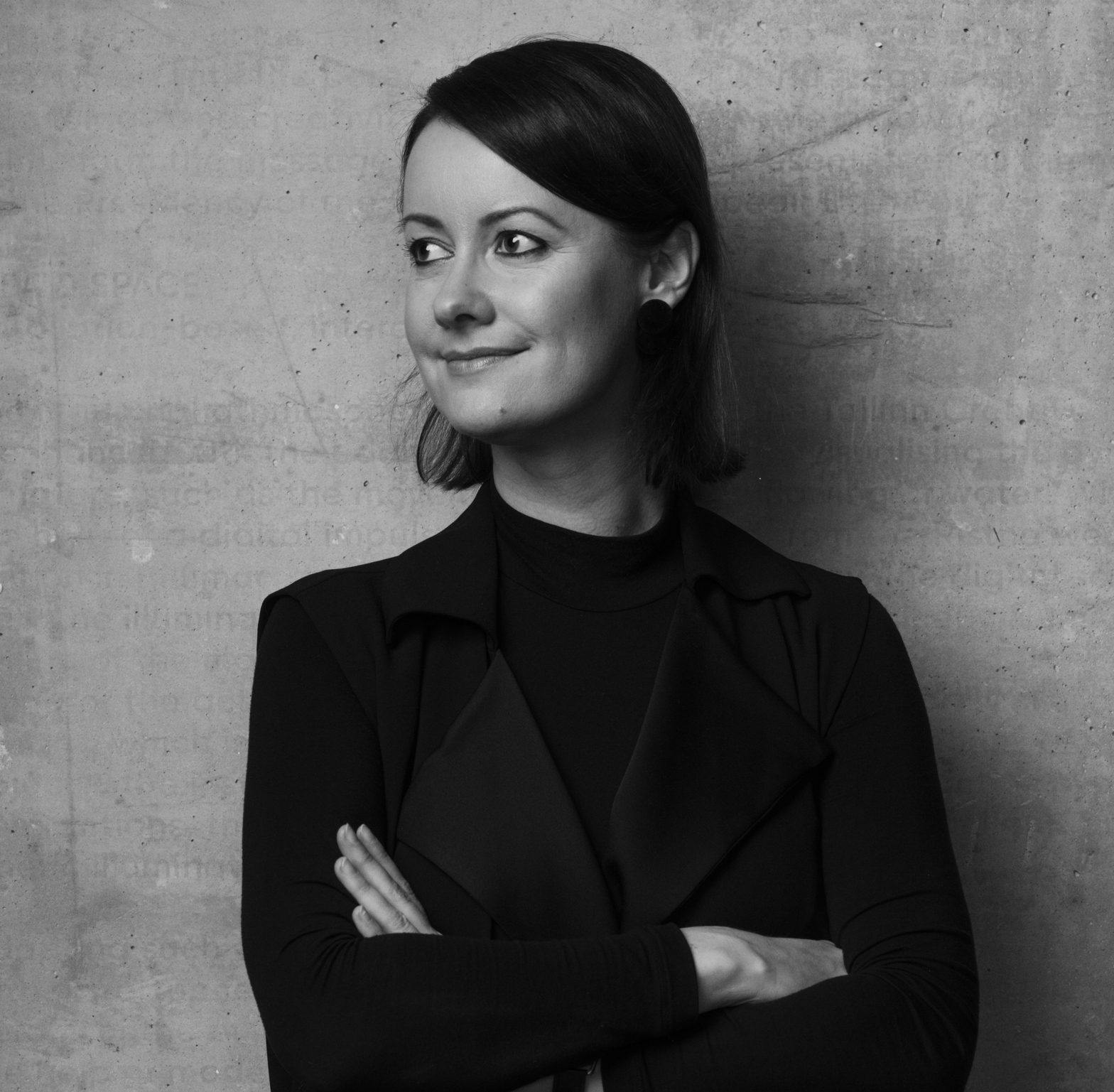
Sildna in February 2018

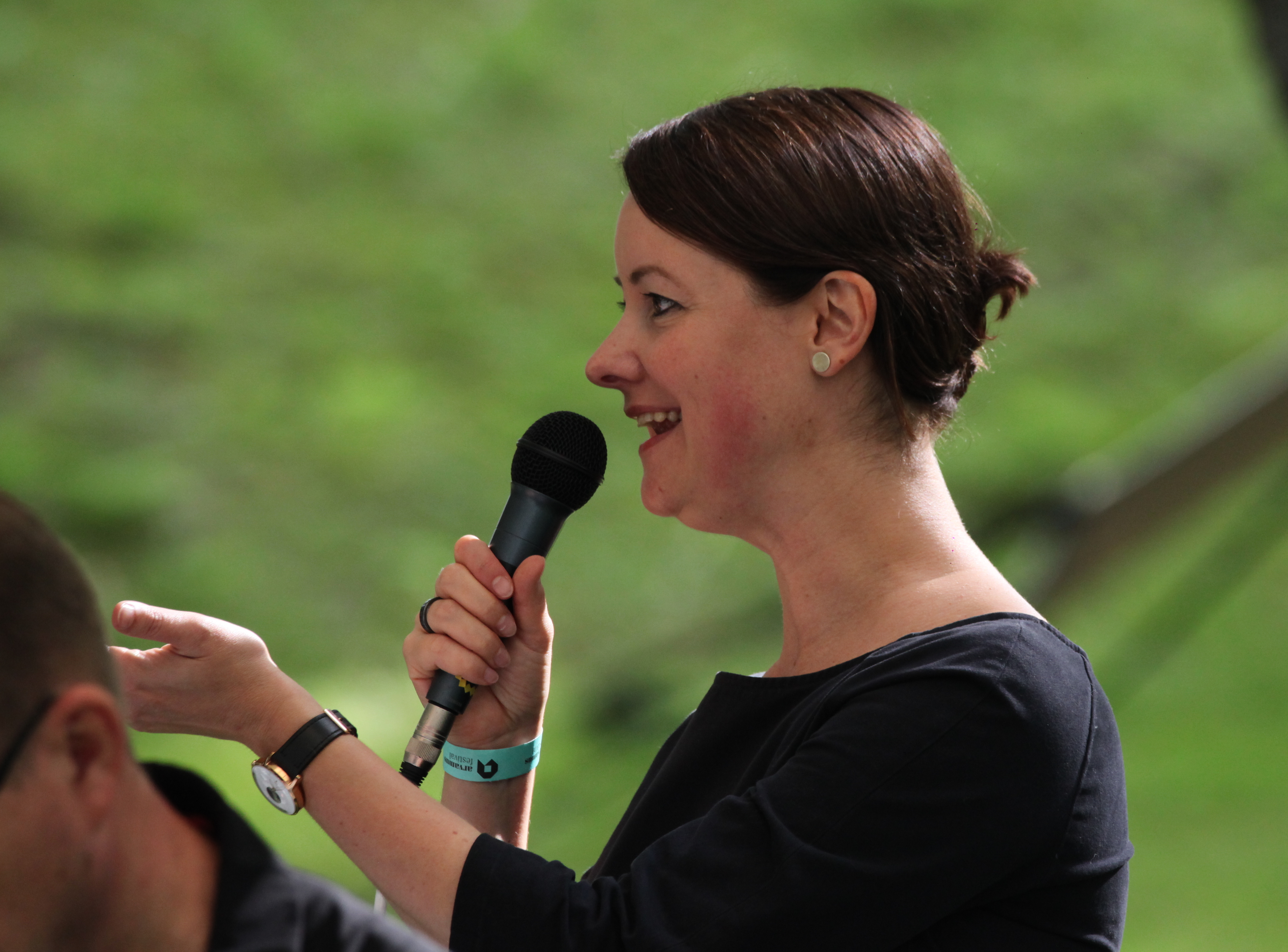
Sildna at the Opinion Festival in Paide, Estonia in August 2021

Helen Sildna is an Estonian cultural entrepreneur. She is the CEO, founder and owner of Shiftworks, and the head of Tallinn Music Week and Station Narva festivals that the company runs.

== Biography ==
Sildna has been a music promoter and event producer since 2000. Having worked at the concert agency BDG in the Baltics (currently Live Nation), as an international talent booker, she established her own music promotion company Musiccase in 2009. The company was rebranded and renamed Shiftworks in 2017 and specializes in international events production, artistic content promotion, as well as initiation and execution of marketing, communications, and creative projects that have potential for positive societal impact.

Sildna is the founder and director of Tallinn Music Week (TMW) run by Shiftworks. It has been held each spring in Tallinn, Estonia since 2009. In 2018, Tallinn Music Week hosted 262 artists from 31 countries, 1330 conference delegates and over 34,000 festival visitors.

Sildna is a board member of Music Estonia. Between 2012 and 2016, she was a member of President Toomas Hendrik Ilves’s Think Tank

=== Recognition ===
In 2014, Sildna was awarded with the Tampere Music Award at Music & Media Finland's industry gala for Exceptional Achievements in Music Business. In 2015, the Estonian Ministry of Culture nominated her Citizen of the Year. In 2016, Estonian President Toomas Hendrik Ilves awarded her the Order of the White Star of IV Class for her contribution to Estonian music life and civil society. In 2016, she was voted the most influential woman in Estonian culture by Eesti Päevaleht. In November 2017, she gave a speech on the role of culture in building cohesive societies in Europe at the meeting of the Education, Youth, Culture and Sports Council in Brussels. She is currently a member of the Council for Finnish-Estonian Culture Foundation.

In 2018 she received the Citizen of Honour title by the city of Tallinn for her outstanding contribution to promoting cultural tourism to Tallinn and introducing the city to the world.
