= Tallinn Music Week =

Music festival in Tallinn

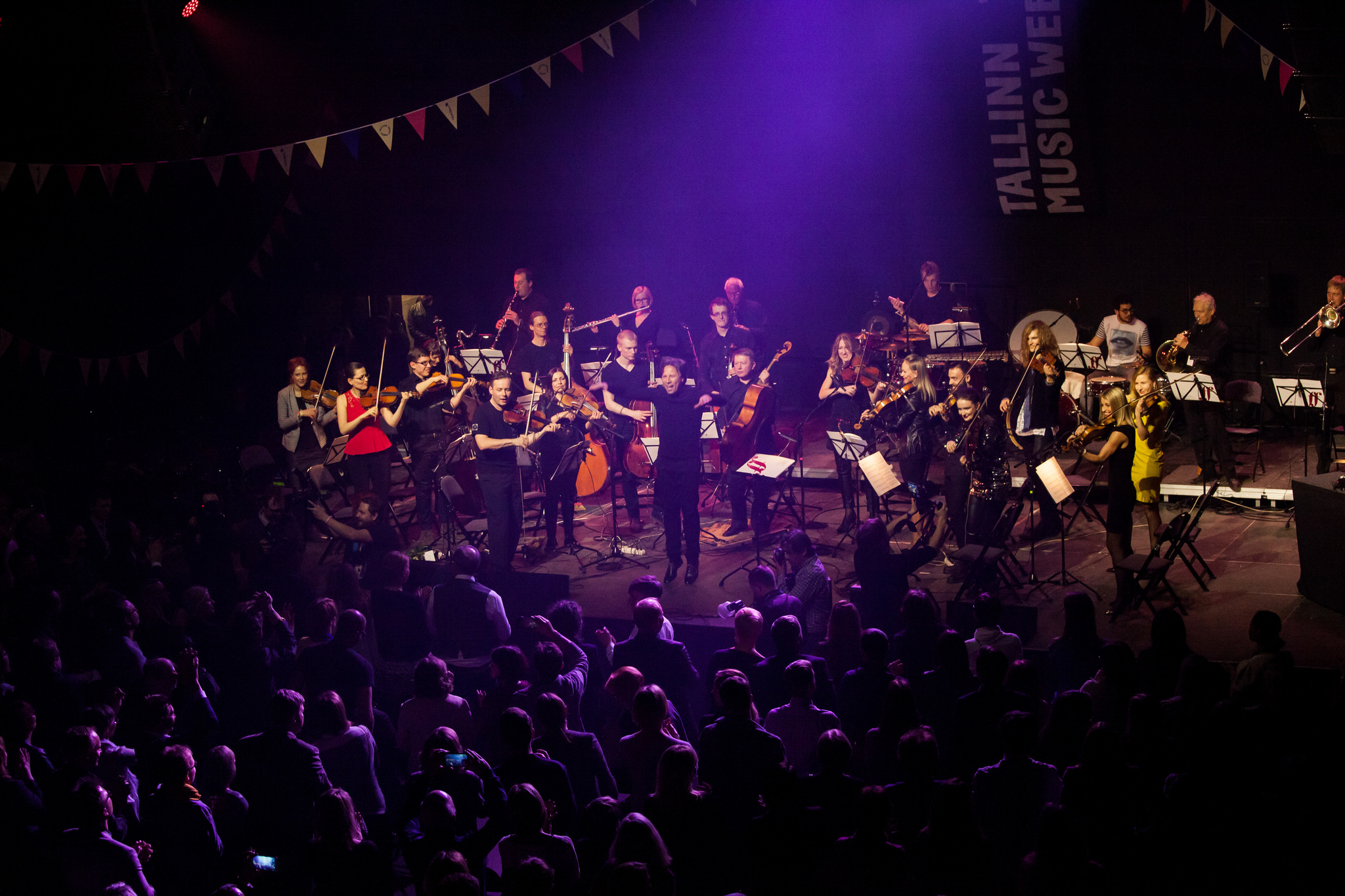
Kristjan Järvi and Glasperlenspiel Sinfonietta at TMW 2016 opening concert

Tallinn Music Week (TMW) is an International new music showcase (INMS), city culture festival and networking event for music and creative industry professionals, held every spring in Tallinn, Estonia since 2009. Operated by Tallinn-based company Shiftworks OÜ, it showcases emerging artists from Europe and elsewhere, provides a networking platform for music and creative industry professionals, and introduces the city of Tallinn. The festival is attended by around 20,000 people and 1,000 music industry executives yearly. TMW has been described as an important industry event and tourist destination by The Guardian, New York Times, Forbes, and Experty.by.

== Festival programme ==
=== Music festival ===
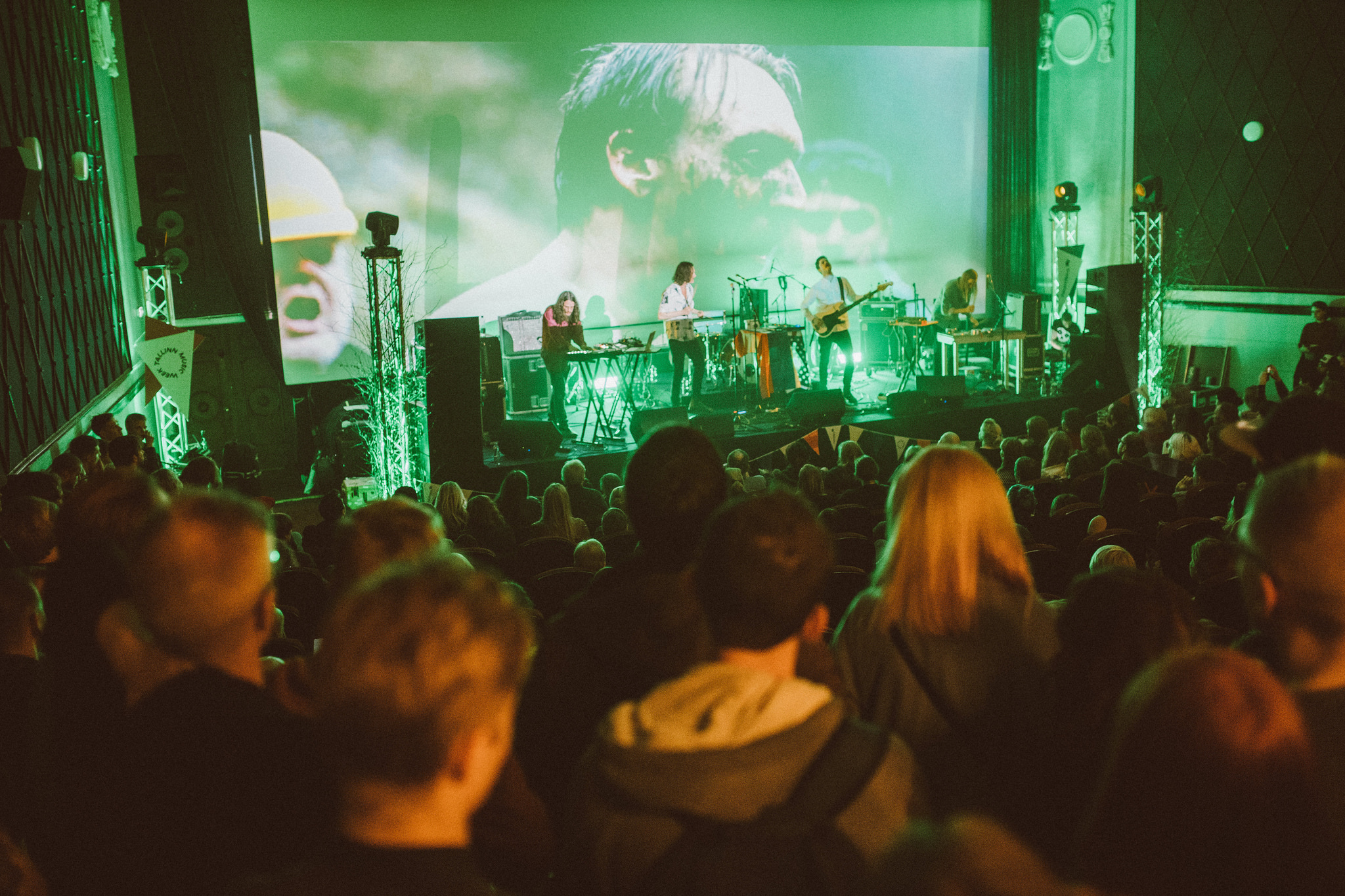
Liima at Kino Sõprus

TMW's music programme presents a multi-genre line-up of 100 – 250 artists. The festival has been noted for introducing new talent from Estonia, the Nordic countries, Russia and elsewhere, in genres ranging from experimental electronica to neo-classical. TMW is also a partner festival of the international Keychange initiative, which encouraged festivals and music organisations to achieve a 50:50 gender balance by 2022.

TMW's line-up is selected from artist applications by a team of Estonian and international curators and presented to an audience of around 20,000 people and 1,000 industry professionals.

TMW's strategic partner is the music industry development centre and export office Music Estonia (ME). The membership of both TMW and ME in the European talent exchange network ETEP has enabled at least two Estonian artists to perform at the Eurosonic Noorderslag festival every year. The Songwriting Camp, launched by TMW, ME and the Estonian national Eurovision Song Contest selection Eesti Laul, has fostered collaboration between Estonian and international artists and producers. As part of the Finnish-Estonian export project Finest Sounds (2016 - 2019), several Estonian artists, including Mari Kalkun, Peedu Kass and Talbot, were showcased in Japan, and Japanese music industry delegates took part in TMW seminars and workshops.

Among the Estonian acts who have performed at the festival and won TMW's annual artist award (Skype Award 2009–2014, Wire Prize 2015, Telliskivi Creative City Award 2016, Telia & Telliskivi Award 2017–2018) are Popidiot (2009), Iiris (2010), Ewert and The Two Dragons (2011), Talbot (2012), Elephants From Neptune (2013), Odd Hugo (2014), Maarja Nuut (2015), I Wear* Experiment (2016), Mart Avi, Erki Pärnoja, NOËP (2017) and Mart Avi, Mari Kalkun, Holy Motors (2018).

International acts that have performed at the festival include Vashti Bunyan (UK), C Duncan (UK), The Membranes (UK), Glen Matlock (UK), Eric Copeland (US), Kara-Lis Coverdale (CA), Motorama (RU), Shortparis (RU), Kate NV (RU), Kate Boy (SE), Rubik (FI), Kimmo Pohjonen (FI), Jaakko Eino Kalevi (FI), Liima (DK/FI), Kristjan Järvi (US), Yukon Blonde (CA), Sturle Dagsland (NO), Hauschka (DE), Alexander Hacke (DE).

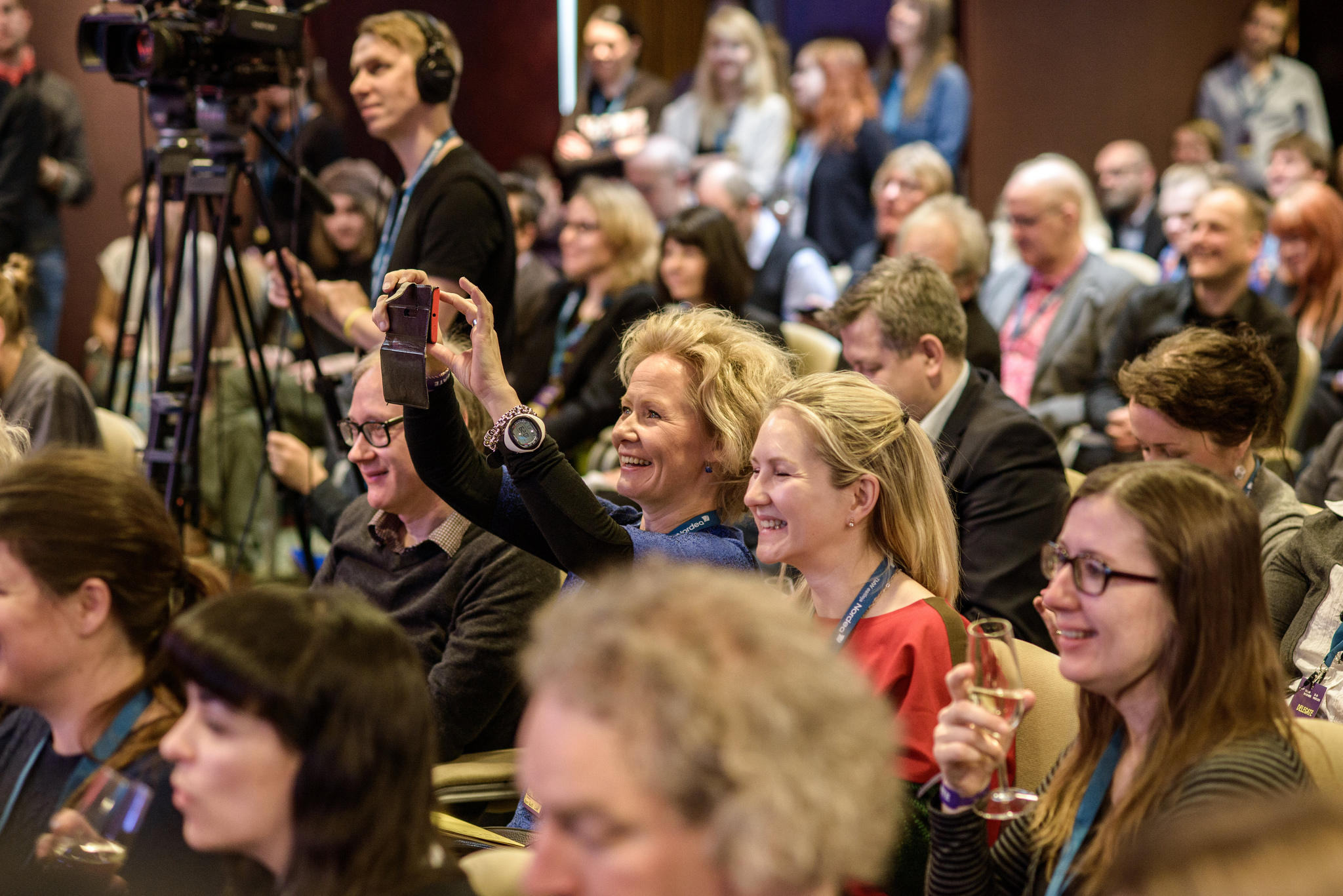
TMW Conference opening at Nordic Hotel Forum

=== Conference ===
Besides the basics of the music industry, the TMW conference has looked into the impact of arts as an engine for the economy and the functioning of an innovative society, and is attended by around 1,000 music professionals, creatives, entrepreneurs and policy makers from different areas. Recurring themes have included civil activism and sustainable development. In 2018, TMW's conference became the first international conference in Estonia to reach a gender balance among speakers.

Participants in the conference panel discussions have included Seymour Stein, the founder and president of Sire Records (Madonna, Ramones); managers Simon Napier-Bell (The Yardbirds, Marc Bolan, Wham!), Petri Lunden (Cardigans, Europe), Edward Bicknell (Dire Straits, Scott Walker, Bryan Ferry) and Peter Jenner (Pink Floyd); artists-turned- authors Viv Albertine (The Slits), John Robb (The Membranes, Louder Than War) and Bob Stanley (St Etienne); musicians Glen Matlock (Sex Pistols, Rich Kids) and Barry Adamson; the Russian feminist punk rock protest group Pussy Riot; and musicologists Simon Reynolds and Adam Harper.

Since 2016, the TMW conference has expanded from music industry topics towards a wider social agenda, with speakers from other fields including US-based entrepreneur and philanthropist Hamdi Ulukaya, artist and activist iO Tillett Wright, gene researcher Lili Milani, then- MEP Felix Reda, Silicon Valley business angel Fadi Bishara, city developer Gunvor Kronman and post-punk designer Malcolm Garrett.

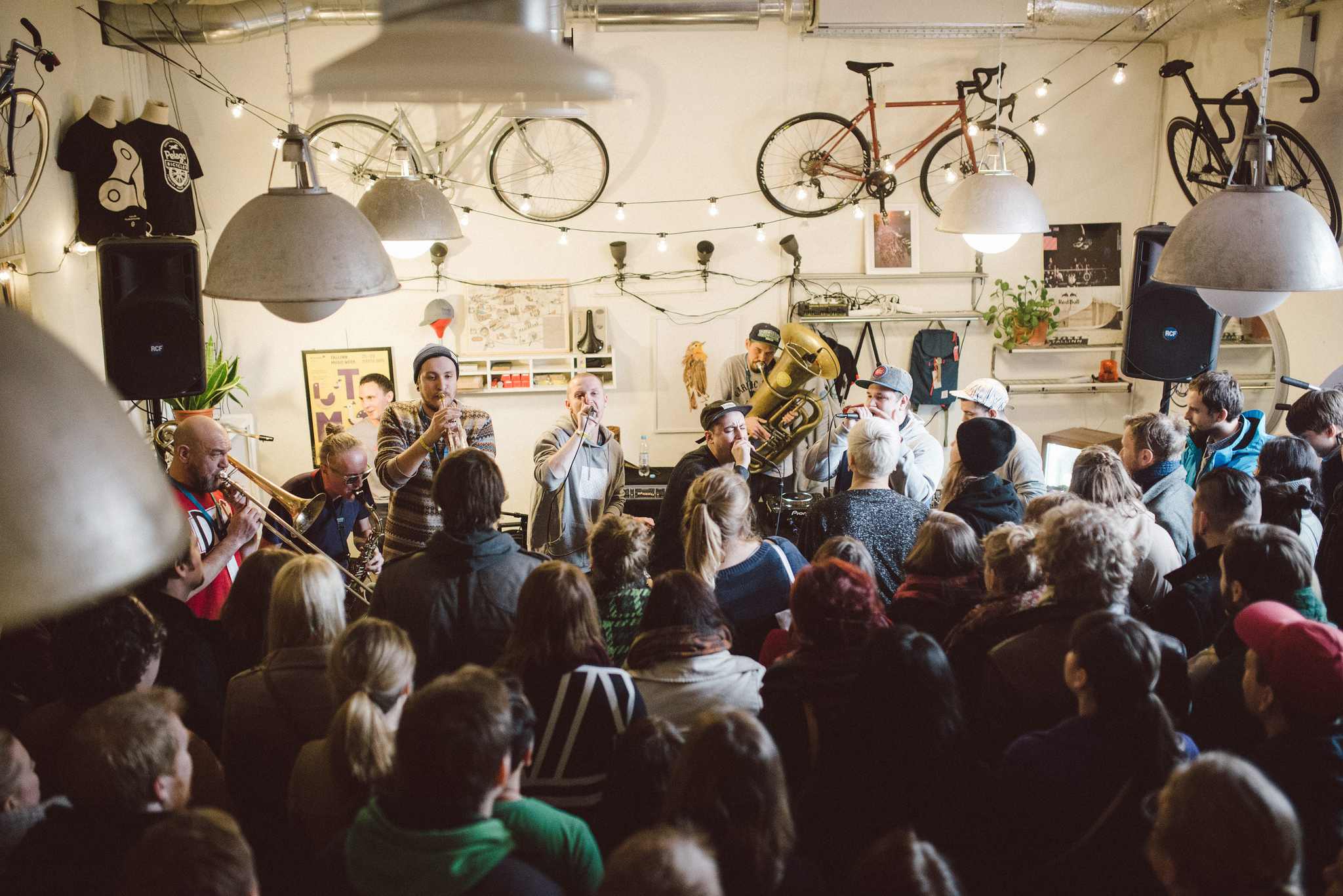
Gorö Lana at Jooks bike shop

=== City Festival ===
TMW’s city festival offers a daytime programme ranging from art, design and cuisine to children’s workshops, as well as public discussions and explorations of urban space.

== Awards and credits ==
- 2011: the "Best Newish Event in 2011" award at The Great Escape music conference.
- 2012: the "Best Hotel and Convention Bar" with the festival's hotel and convention center Nordic Hotel Forum.
- 2014: the "Best Host City Champion" for promoting the city of Tallinn.
- 2014: Tampere Music Award for Exceptional Achievements in Music to Helen Sildna, the founder and director of Tallinn Music Week.
- 2016: The Order of the White Star of IV Class to Tallinn Music Week founder Helen Sildna for her contribution to Estonian music life and civil society.

In autumn 2014, the British daily The Guardian and Sunday paper The Observer included Tallinn Music Week in their list of the top 5 music festivals in the world for winter breaks.

Tallinn Music Week facts and figures
Edition	Year	Dates	Attendance	Total number of acts	Estonian acts	Artist award
1	2009	26–29 March	4000	67	65	Skype Award: Popidiot
2	2010	25–27 March	6000	70	68	Skype Award: Iiris
3	2011	24–26 March	7600	147	123	Skype Award: Ewert and the Two Dragons
4	2012	29–31 March	11 200	183	150	Skype Award: Talbot
5	2013	4–6 April	17 038	233	123	Skype Award: Elephants from Neptune
6	2014	27–29 March	22 900	227	149	Skype Award: Odd Hugo
7	2015	25–29 March	24 050	206	121	Wire Prize: Maarja Nuut
8	2016	28 March–3 April	34 670	240	116	Telliskivi Creative City Award: I Wear*Experiment
9	2017	27 March–2 April	36 823	250	114	Telia & Telliskivi Creative City Award: Mart Avi, Erki Pärnoja, NOËP
10	2018	2–8 April	34 170	262	127	Telia & Telliskivi Creative City Award: Mart Avi, Mari Kalkun, Holy Motors
11	2019	25–31 March	22 587	170	70	N/A
12	2020	27–30 August (planned for 25–28 March, rescheduled due to COVID-19 pandemic)	20 233	140	>100	
13	2021	29 September–3 October	17 325	177	103	
14	2022	4–8 May	TBA	TBA	TBA	

== Media coverage ==
In 2014, the British daily The Guardian included Tallinn Music Week in its list of the top 10 music festivals for winter breaks. “Tallinn is known for its art-nouveau architecture, free public transport – and its ability to attract stag and hen parties. It's also becoming increasingly relevant for the music it serves up, especially at this developing annual event," the paper said.

In 2014, Źmicier Biezkaravajny of Experty.by, writing in Belorusy i rynok, said, “The Tallinn one is attractive primarily because it is one of the highest-rated but at the same time affordable events in terms of opportunities for a little-known artist to demonstrate its work to a foreign listener.”

In 2016, Tom Hawking of Flavorwire wrote that "/.../ the Estonian national government clearly has no problem providing state funding for such an endeavor, as well as getting involved in other, more hands-on ways. And by that, I mean that the freaking President of Estonia played a DJ set at this year's festival. As much as "cool" is an integral part of Barack Obama's brand, it's hard to imagine him getting on the wheels of steel to drop an impromptu Chicago house set."

In 2017–2018, The Quietus published articles on Estonian experimental music and credited TMW with “promoting leftfield adventurous artists and feeding off questions of gender identity and social righteousness”.

In 2019, Forbes described the TMW festival centre Telliskivi Creative City as a burgeoning arts hub.
