= Rolf Roosalu =

Estonian singer

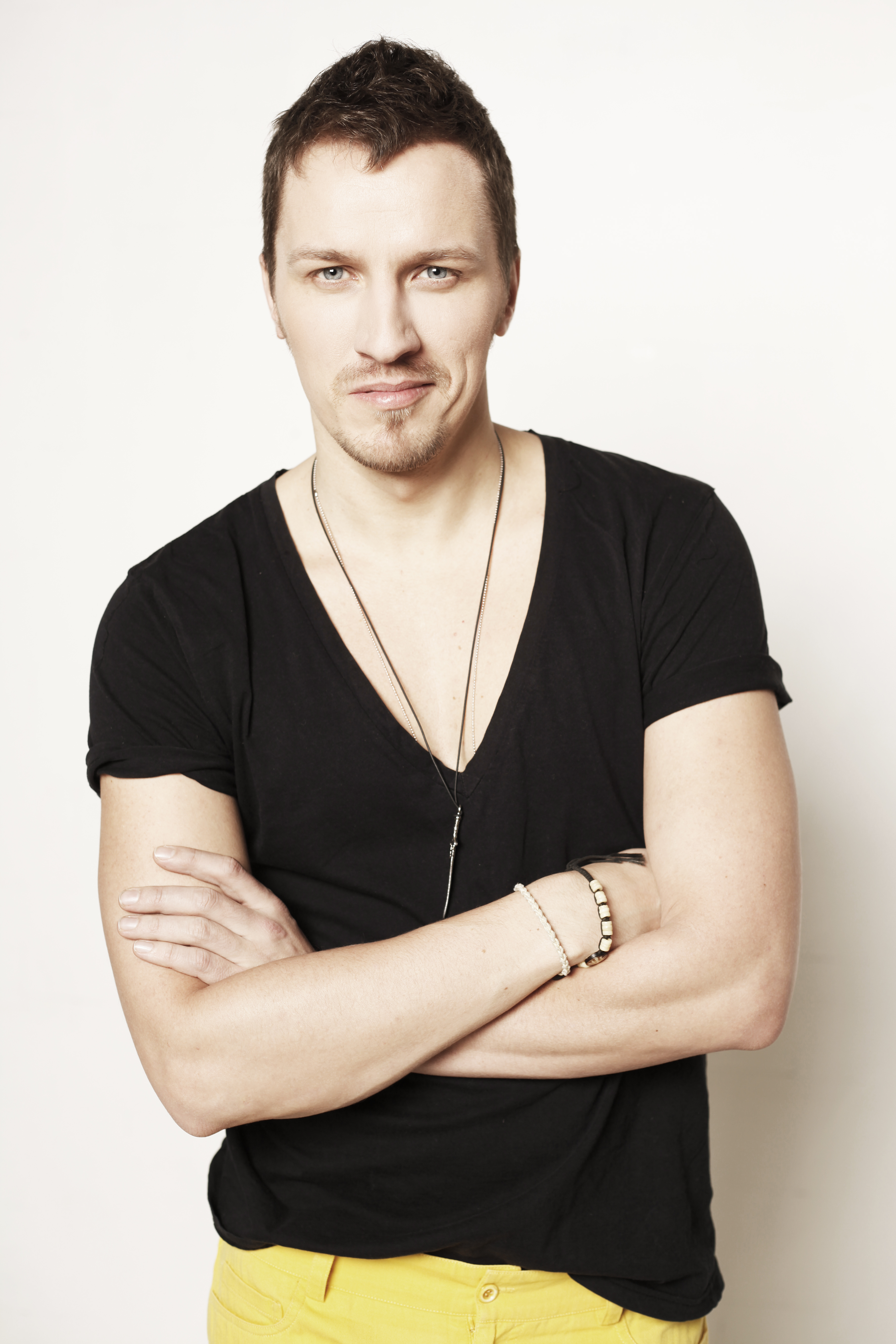
- Rolf Roosalu in 2014.

Background information
- Also known as: Rolf Junior
- Born: 18 January 1982 (age 44); Tartu, then part of Estonian SSR, Soviet Union
- Origin: Estonia
- Genres: Pop, Musical

Rolf Roosalu, also known as Rolf Junior (born 18 January 1982 in Tartu), is an Estonian singer who has participated in a number of musicals. He has also, yet unsuccessfully, competed to represent Estonia at the Eurovision Song Contest six times (2008–13), with him most recently competing at Eesti Laul 2018. In 2010, when the contest was held in Oslo, he announced the Estonian televoting results to the other countries. In 2013, he did the same when the contest was held in Malmö.

== Musical work ==
=== 2007 ===
- Les Misérables

=== 2006 ===
- Fame
- Amberstar
- Tuhkatriinu
- Cats, Andrew Lloyd Webber musical
- West Side Story

=== 2004 ===
- Starlight Cabaret,
- Vampiiride Tants
- Öölaps

=== 2003 ===
- Kaks takti ette
- The Caribbean Moods
- Miss Saigon
- The Greatest Love Stories
- Summertime
- Estvocal
- Euro Hit

=== 2002 ===
- Raimond Valgre Festival
- Fizz Superstar (TV talent show)
- Laulatus

=== 1998 ===
- Pokumäng

=== 1995 ===
- Don Quixote
- Kaval-Ants ja Vanapagan

=== 1993 ===
- Oliver!
