= Soul Militia =

Estonian musical group

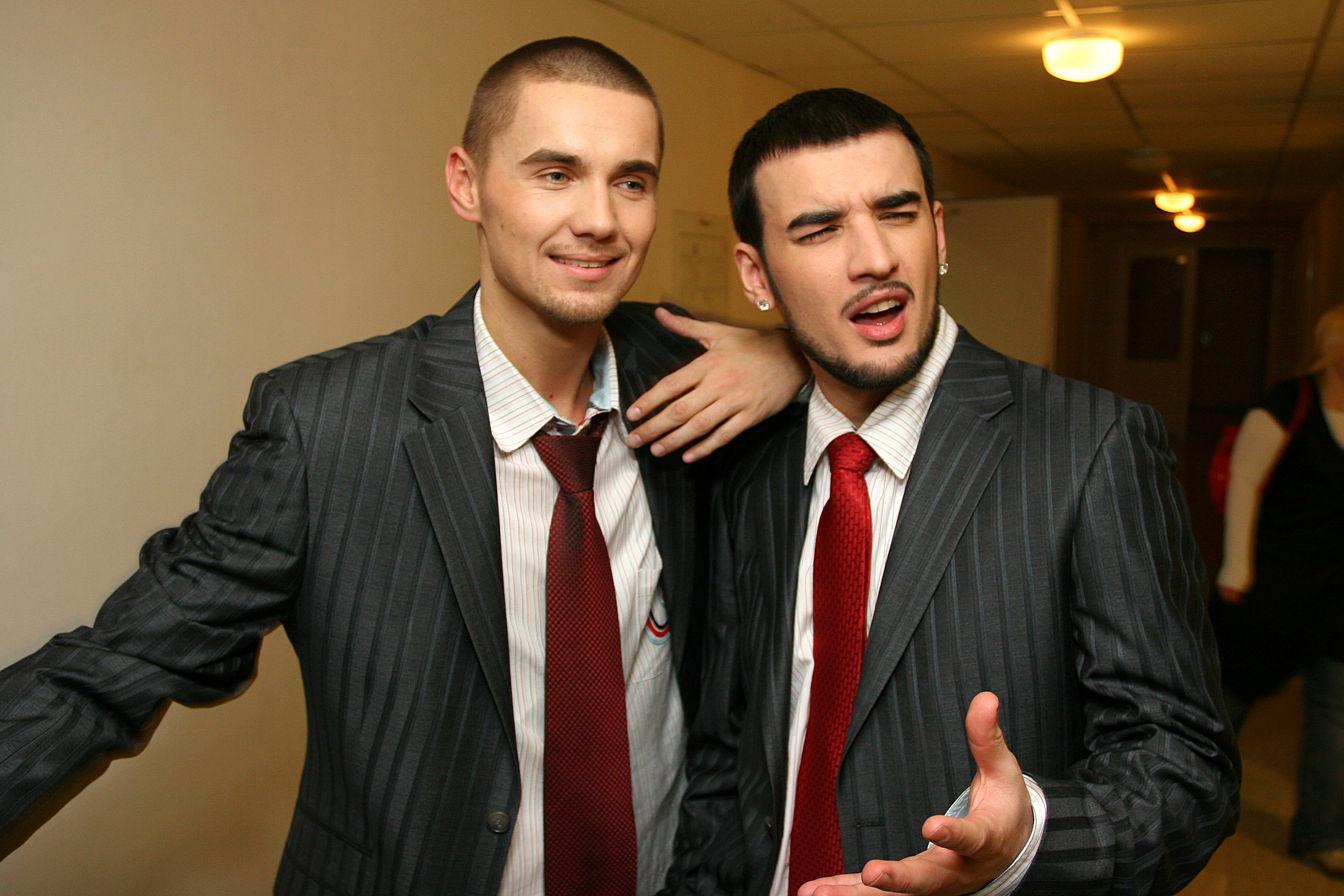
- Lauri Pihlap and Kaido Põldma in 2007.

Background information
- Origin: Estonia
- Genres: Hip-hop
- Years active: 1997-
- Members: Sergei Morgun (Semy); Lauri Pihlap (Lowry); Kaido Põldma (Craig)
- Past members: Indrek Soom (Ince)

Soul Militia (known until 2002 as 2XL) is an Estonian hip-hop act, internationally most notable for winning the Eurovision Song Contest 2001 as backing singers for Tanel Padar and Dave Benton, with the song "Everybody", which they had also covered on their own in concert. The group consists of Lauri Pihlap ("Lowry"), Sergei Morgun ("Semy") and Kaido Põldma ("Craig"). A fourth member, Indrek Soom ("Ince"), left the group in 2004. 2XL was founded by Morgun and Soom in 1997. They later participated in the 2007 Estonian Eurovision preselection with a song titled "My Place".

Awards and achievements
Preceded by (Denmark) Olsen Brothers with "Fly on the Wings of Love"	Winner of the Eurovision Song Contest (with Tanel Padar and Dave Benton); 2001	Succeeded by (Latvia) Marie N with "I Wanna"
Preceded by Ines with "Once in a Lifetime"	Estonia in the Eurovision Song Contest (with Tanel Padar and Dave Benton); 2001	Succeeded by Sahlene with "Runaway"
