= Urban Symphony =

Estonian musical group (2007–2010)

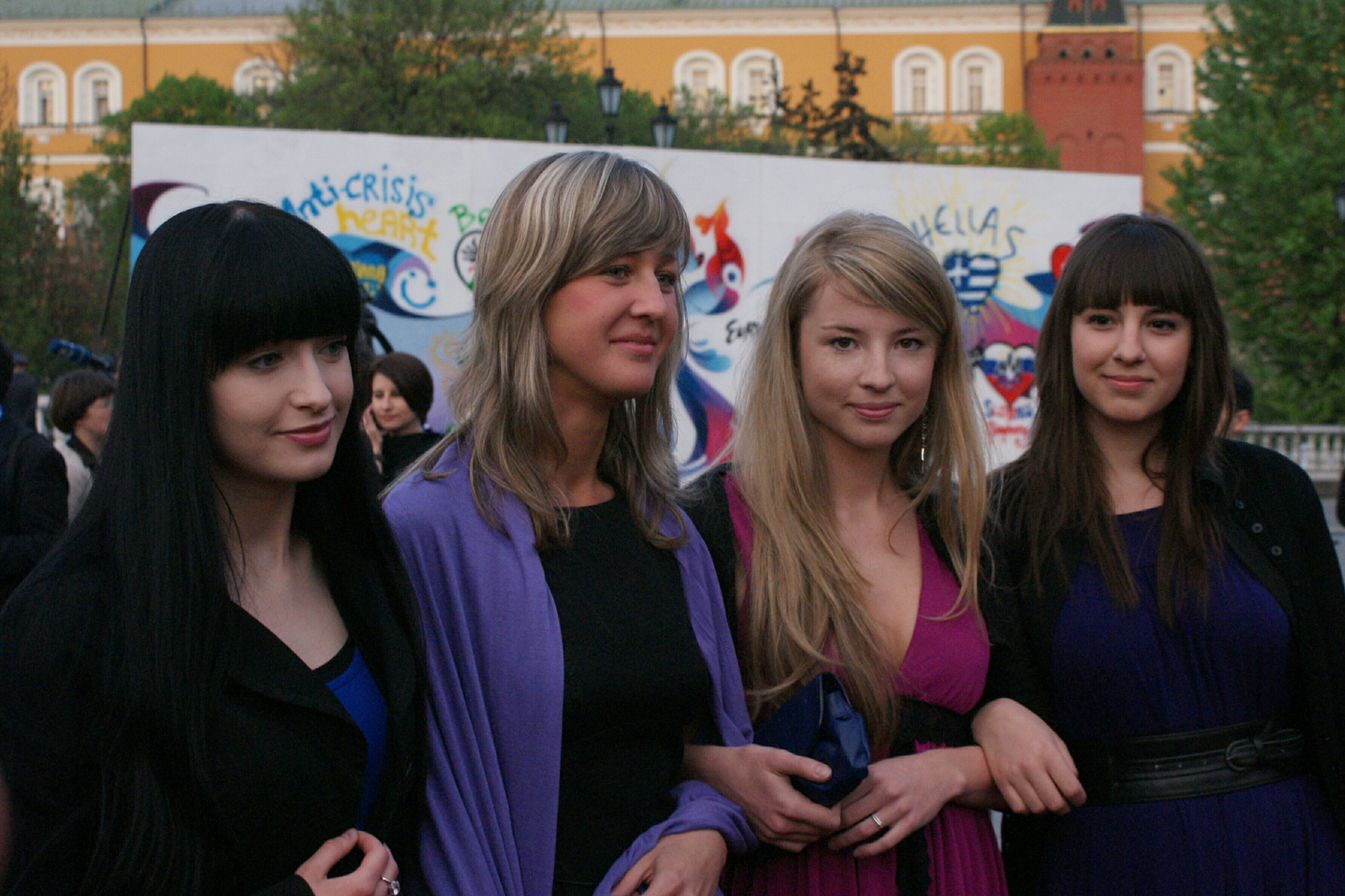
- Urban Symphony in 2009

Background information
- Origin: Tallinn, Estonia
- Genres: Classical crossover, electronic, pop
- Years active: 2007–2010
- Past members: Sandra Nurmsalu; Mann Helstein; Johanna Mängel; Mari Möldre

Urban Symphony are an Estonian music group. They represented Estonia in the Eurovision Song Contest 2009 with the song "Rändajad", finishing in 6th place with 129 points. In doing this, they achieved Estonia's 6th best placement of all time, and the best placement from after their win in 2001 until 2025.

== History ==
In autumn 2007, Sandra Nurmsalu took part in the singing talent show called 2 takti ette, biennially held by the Eesti Televisioon and broadcast nationwide. In a week of the contest, the contestants were tasked to form bands each on their own and each to produce a performance with it. Nurmsalu had studied the violin for two years in the Georg Ots Music School and had previously arranged the song "Nothing Else Matters" by Metallica for a string set of the school. Therefore, she decided to use one again. Nurmsalu turned to her former school, where she was introduced to Mann Helstein playing the viola, Johanna Mängel playing the cello, a female contrabass player and a male keyboardist. The band re-scored the song "Hungry" by Kosheen and were pleased with the resulting televised and video recorded live performance. At the end of the series, Nurmsalu, Helstein and Mängel agreed to continue their collaboration. Mängel brought the new cello player Mari Möldre to the band. In the same while, Sven Lõhmus, a music producer invited the group to work with him. The first track the team completed was "Rändajad" for the contest of Eesti Laul, the Estonian selection for the Eurovision Song Contest 2009. The song went on to gain 6th place in the Eurovision final. For this project, Marilin Kongo and Mirjam Mesak joined the group to sing backing vocals. They also sing in Päikese poole, Skorpion and Crying in the Rain.

In 2010, Urban Symphony announced that they would be disbanding. The announcement was due to Nurmsalu wishing to prioritise motherhood, while the group's other members wished to continue their studies and pursue other interests.

== Members ==
- Sandra Nurmsalu
- Johanna Mängel
- Mari Möldre
- Mann Helstein

The producer Sven Lõhmus had previous Eurovision experience by writing the unsuccessful Estonian entry of "Let's Get Loud" for the Eurovision Song Contest 2005, held in Kyiv that year. Marilin Kongo was 8th with her entry "Be 1st" in Eurolaul 2006, the Estonian selection for the Eurovision Song Contest 2006. The backing singer Mirjam Mesak supported Gerli Padar with backing vocals on stage of Eurovision Song Contest 2007.

== Discography ==
=== Singles ===
Year	Single	Peak positions							Album
Year	Single	EST	SWE	FIN	BEL (Vl)	SUI	GRE	UK	Album
2009	"Rändajad"	3	14	10	68	86	8	117	TBA
2009	"Päikese poole"	12	—	—	—	—	—	—	TBA
2010	"Skorpion"	11	—	—	—	—	—	—	TBA
"—" denotes releases that did not chart or were not released.

Awards and achievements
Preceded by Kreisiraadio with "Leto svet"	Estonia in the Eurovision Song Contest; 2009	Succeeded by Malcolm Lincoln and Manpower 4 with "Siren"
