= Tantsud tähtedega 2011 =

Estonian television series

- Season 2011
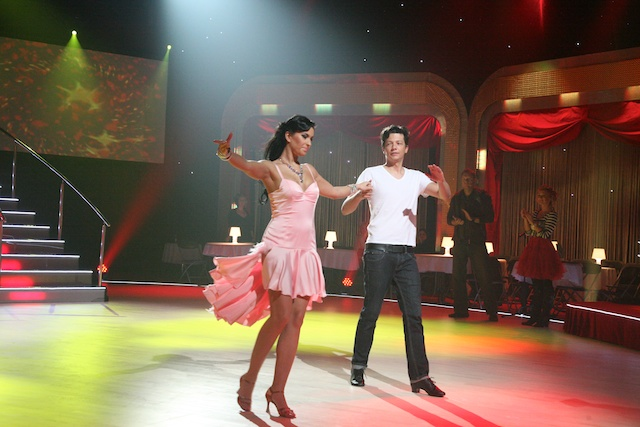
- Participants
- No. of episodes: 8

Release
- Original network: Kanal 2
- Original release: 9 October 2011

Season chronology
- ← Previous; Tantsud tähtedega 2010

Tantsud tähtedega 2011 is the fifth season of the Estonian version of Dancing with the Stars, and was broadcast on the Estonian television channel Kanal 2 starting on 9 October 2011. The hosts were Mart Sander and Liina Randpere. The judges were Merle Klandorf and Jüri Nael. Each week a former contestant joined them as the guest judge.

== Couples ==
Celebrity	Occupation	Professional partner	Status
Veronika Portsmuth	Conductor & Singer	Märt Agu	Eliminated 1st on 16 October 2011
Andres Anvelt	Former Central Criminal Police Chief, Riigikogu Member & Writer	Kristina Tennokese	Eliminated 2nd on 23 October 2011
Ott Väli	School teacher & Annual Young Teacher Scholarship Holder	Emma-Leena Koger	Eliminated 3rd on 30 October 2011
Kati Toots	Socialite	Marko Kiigajaan	Eliminated 4th on 6 November 2011
Stig Rästa	Singer and Eesti Laul 2015 Winner	Karina Vesman	Eliminated 5th on 13 November 2011
Getter Jaani	Singer & Eesti Laul 2011 Winner	Ott-Sander Palm	Third Place on 20 November 2011
Anna Levandi	World Silver Medalist Figure skater	Mairold Millert	Second Place on 4 December 2011
Jan Uuspõld	Actor	Aleksandra Žeregelja	Winners on 4 December 2011

== Scores ==
Couple	Place	1	2	1+2	3	4	5	6	7	8
Jan & Aleksandra	1	16	14	30	22	21+23=44	24+9=33	24+27=51	29+29=58	27+28+30=85
Anna & Mairold	2	13	18	31	18	23+23=46	25+10=35	22+27=49	29+29=58	25+30+30=85
Getter & Ott-Sander	3	12	18	30	17	17+24=41	15+7=22	22+21=43	25+24=49	
Stig & Karina	4	14	19	33	13	23+19=42	15+6=21	24+22=46		
Kati & Marko	5	10	18	28	21	20+21=41	21+8=29			
Ott & Emma-Leena	6	15	10	25	16	16+13=29				
Andres & Kristina	7	11	16	27	13					
Veronika & Märt	8	13	14	27						

Red numbers indicate the lowest score for each week.
Green numbers indicate the highest score for each week.
indicates the couple eliminated that week.
indicates the returning couple that finished in the bottom two.
indicates the winning couple.
indicates the runners-up.

== Highest and lowest scoring performances ==
The best and worst performances in each dance according to the judges' marks are as follows:

Dance	Best dancer	Best score	Worst dancer	Worst score
Cha-Cha-Cha	Jan Uuspõld	27	Kati Toots	10
Waltz	Anna Levandi	30	Andres Anvelt	11
Samba	Anna Levandi	25	Ott Väli	10
Foxtrot	Jan Uuspõld	24	Andres Anvelt	13
Viennese Waltz	Anna Levandi	29	Stig Rästa	15
Rumba	Getter Jaani	24	Anna Levandi	18
Argentine Tango	Jan Uuspõld; Anna Levandi	23	Ott Väli	16
Quickstep	Jan Uuspõld	29	Getter Jaani	15
Jive Marathon	Anna Levandi	10	Stig Rästa	6
Paso Doble	Jan Uuspõld; Anna Levandi	29	Getter Jaani	25
Showdance	Jan Uuspõld; Anna Levandi	30	—	—

== Averages ==
Rank by average	Place	Couple	Total points earned	Dances performed	Average
1	1	Jan & Aleksandra	314	13	24.2
2	2	Anna & Mairold	312	13	24.0
3	3	Getter & Ott-Sander	195	10	19.5
4	4	Stig & Karina	149	8	18.6
5	5	Kati & Marko	111	6	18.5
6	6	Ott & Emma-Leena	70	5	14.0
7	8	Veronika & Märt	27	2	13.5
8	7	Andres & Kristina	40	3	13.3

The table does not include the Jive Marathon scores.

== Couples' highest and lowest scoring dances ==
Couples	Average score	Best dances	Worst dances
Jan & Aleksandra	24.2	Showdance (30)	Samba (14)
Anna & Mairold	24.0	Waltz & Showdance (30)	Cha-cha-cha (13)
Getter & Ott-Sander	19.5	Paso Doble (25)	Cha-cha-cha (12)
Stig & Karina	18.6	Team Cha-cha-cha (24)	Cha-cha-cha (13)
Kati & Marko	18.5	Rumba, Samba & Waltz (21)	Cha-cha-cha (10)
Ott & Emma-Leena	14.0	Viennese Waltz & Argentine Tango (16)	Samba (10)
Andres & Kristina	13.3	Samba (16)	Waltz (11)
Veronika & Märt	13.5	Foxtrot (14)	Cha-cha-cha (13)

== Songs and Individual Scoring ==
=== Week 1 ===
- Guest judge: Argo Ader, bodybuilder & Tantsud tähtedega 2008 (Season 3) winner

Individual judges scores in charts below (given in parentheses) are listed in this order from left to right: Merle Klandorf, Jüri Nael and Argo Ader.

Running order

Couple	Score	Style	Music
Anna & Mairold	13 (4,4,5)	Cha-cha-cha	"Danza Kuduro" – Don Omar featuring Lucenzo
Andres & Kristina	11 (3,4,4)	Waltz	"If You Don't Know Me By Now" – Seal
Kati & Marko	10 (3,3,4)	Cha-cha-cha	"Mr. Saxobeat" – Alexandra Stan
Jan & Aleksandra	16 (6,5,5)	Waltz	"My Love" – Sia
Getter & Ott-Sander	12 (3,4,5)	Cha-cha-cha	"It's My Life" – Bon Jovi
Stig & Karina	14 (4,5,5)	Waltz	"Kissing You" – Des'ree
Veronika & Märt	13 (4,4,5)	Cha-cha-cha	"Tsirkus" – Fix
Ott & Emma-Leena	15 (5,5,5)	Waltz	"Dark Waltz" – Hayley Westenra

=== Week 2 ===
- Guest judge: Vilja Savisaar-Toomast, Member of the European Parliament & Tantsud tähtedega 2006 (Season 1) contestant

Individual judges scores in charts below (given in parentheses) are listed in this order from left to right: Merle Klandorf, Jüri Nael and Vilja Savisaar-Toomast.

Running order

Couple	Score	Style	Music
Jan & Aleksandra	14 (5,4,5)	Samba	"Suhkur" – G-Enka, Ott Lepland, Teele Viira, J.O.C. & LoopPirates
Veronika & Märt	14 (5,4,5)	Foxtrot	"Laul Põhjamaast"
Ott & Emma-Leena	10 (3,3,4)	Samba	"Tiigrikutsu" – Joel Steinfeldt
Getter & Ott-Sander	18 (6,5,7)	Foxtrot	"Koit" – Tõnis Mägi
Stig & Karina	19 (6,6,7)	Samba	"Pankrot" – Toe Tag
Kati & Marko	18 (7,5,6)	Foxtrot	"Ilus hetk" – Jaan Tätte
Andres & Kristina	16 (4,6,6)	Samba	"Lihtsad asjad" – Laura Põldvere
Anna & Mairold	18 (5,6,7)	Foxtrot	"Õige valik" – Raimond Valgre

=== Week 3 ===
- Guest judge: Lauri Pedaja, actor, Hairdresser & Tantsud tähtedega 2008 (Season 3) semi-finalist

Individual judges scores in charts below (given in parentheses) are listed in this order from left to right: Merle Klandorf, Jüri Nael and Lauri Pedaja.

Running order

Couple	Score	Style	Music
Getter & Ott-Sander	17 (5,6,6)	Samba	"Barbie Girl" – Aqua "Magalenha" – Sérgio Mendes
Stig & Karina	13 (4,4,5)	Cha-cha-cha	"Stay" – Maurice Williams and the Zodiacs
Andres & Kristina	13 (3,5,5)	Foxtrot	"My Way" – Frank Sinatra
Ott & Emma-Leena	16 (4,5,7)	Viennese Waltz	"Viini valss" – Orelipoiss
Kati & Marko	21 (7,7,7)	Rumba	"Sexy Plexi" – Jack Johnson
Anna & Mairold	18 (5,6,7)	Rumba	"Selliseks ma jäin" – Hedvig Hanson
Jan & Aleksandra	22 (6,8,8)	Cha-cha-cha	"Se Rompieron los Termómetros" – Manolito y su Trabuco

=== Week 4 ===
- Guest judge: Martin Parmas, Ballroom dancer, formerly on Tantsud tähtedega.

Individual judges scores in charts below (given in parentheses) are listed in this order from left to right: Merle Klandorf, Jüri Nael and Martin Parmas.

Running order

Couple	Score	Style	Music
Ott & Emma-Leena; Kati & Marko; Getter & Ott-Sander	16 (4,6,6); 20 (6,7,7); 17 (5,7,5)	Argentine Tango Relay	"Enjoy the Silence" – Depeche Mode
Jan & Aleksandra	21 (7,7,7)	Rumba	"Run to You" – Whitney Houston
Anna & Mairold	23 (7,8,8)	Samba	"Baila, Baila" – Angela Via featuring Joe Budden
Stig & Karina	23 (8,8,7)	Rumba	"When We Dance" – Sting
Ott & Emma-Leena	13 (3,6,4)	Cha-cha-cha	"Love Potion No. 9" – The Coasters
Kati & Marko	21 (7,8,6)	Samba	"Faith" – George Michael
Getter & Ott-Sander	24 (9,9,6)	Rumba	"Me kõik jääme vanaks" – Getter Jaani
Jan & Aleksandra; Anna & Mairold; Stig & Karina	23 (7,8,8); 23 (8,8,7); 19 (6,7,6)	Argentine Tango Relay	"Sweet Dreams" – Eurythmics

=== Week 5 ===
- Guest judge: Kaisa Oja, Ballroom dancer & Tantsud tähtedega 2010 host

Individual judges scores in charts below (given in parentheses) are listed in this order from left to right: Merle Klandorf, Jüri Nael and Kaisa Oja.

Running order

Couple	Score	Style	Music
Kati & Marko	21 (7,7,7)	Waltz	"Ave Maria" – Mirjam Mesak
Getter & Ott-Sander	15 (5,5,5)	Quickstep	"Tu Vuò Fà L'Americano" – Renato Carosone
Stig & Karina	15 (4,6,5)	Viennese Waltz	"Süte peal sulanud jää" – Ott Lepland
Jan & Aleksandra	24 (8,8,8)	Foxtrot	"Skyscraper" – Demi Lovato
Anna & Mairold	25 (8,8,9)	Waltz	"I See You" – Leona Lewis
Stig & Karina; Getter & Ott-Sander; Kati & Marko; Jan & Aleksandra; Anna & Mairold	6; 7; 8; 9; 10	Jive Marathon	"Hey Ya!" – OutKast

=== Week 6 ===
- Guest judge: Marko Mehine, Ballroom dancer, formerly on Tantsud tähtedega.

Individual judges scores in charts below (given in parentheses) are listed in this order from left to right: Merle Klandorf, Jüri Nael and Marko Mehine.

Running order

Couple	Score	Style	Music
Jan & Aleksandra; Stig & Karina	24 (8,8,8)	Team Cha-cha-cha	"Bad Romance" – Lady Gaga
Anna & Mairold; Getter & Ott-Sander	22 (7,7,8)	Team Cha-cha-cha	"Alors on danse" – Stromae
Jan & Aleksandra	27 (9,9,9)	Viennese Waltz	"Üksinda üksinduses" – Tanel Padar
Stig & Karina	22 (6,8,8)	Foxtrot	"Fever" – Peggy Lee
Anna & Mairold	27 (8,10,9)	Quickstep	"Nah Neh Nah" – Milk & Sugar vs. Vaya Con Dios
Getter & Ott-Sander	21 (7,7,7)	Waltz	"The Greatest Love of All" – Whitney Houston

=== Week 7 ===
- Guest judge: Veiko Ratas, Ballroom dancer, formerly on Tantsud tähtedega.

Individual judges scores in charts below (given in parentheses) are listed in this order from left to right: Merle Klandorf, Jüri Nael and Veiko Ratas.

Running order

Couple	Score	Style	Music
Getter & Ott-Sander	25 (9,8,8)	Paso Doble	"Du riechst so gut" – Rammstein
Getter & Ott-Sander	24 (8,9,7)	Viennese Waltz	"Once Upon a December" – Liz Callaway
Jan & Aleksandra	29 (10,9,10)	Paso Doble	"The Battle" – Hans Zimmer
Jan & Aleksandra	29 (10,10,9)	Quickstep	"Show Me How You Burlesque" – Christina Aguilera
Anna & Mairold	29 (10,10,9)	Paso Doble	"Supermassive Black Hole" – Muse
Anna & Mairold	29 (10,10,9)	Viennese Waltz	"Tundes elus end" – Ott Lepland

=== Week 8 ===
- Guest judge: Ants Tael, former Tantsud tähtedega judge.

Individual judges scores in charts below (given in parentheses) are listed in this order from left to right: Merle Klandorf, Jüri Nael and Ants Tael.

Running order

Couple	Score	Style	Music
Jan & Aleksandra	27 (9,9,9)	Cha-cha-cha	"Se Rompieron los Termómetros" – Manolito y su Trabuco
Jan & Aleksandra	28 (10,9,9)	Waltz	"My Love" – Sia
Jan & Aleksandra	30 (10,10,10)	Showdance	
Anna & Mairold	25 (9,8,8)	Samba	"Baila, Baila" – Angela Via featuring Joe Budden
Anna & Mairold	30 (10,10,10)	Waltz	"I See You" – Leona Lewis
Anna & Mairold	30 (10,10,10)	Showdance	"My Immortal" – Evanescence
Veronika & Märt	N/A	Cha-cha-cha	"Tsirkus" – Fix
Andres & Kristina	N/A	Samba	"Lihtsad asjad" – Laura Põldvere
Ott & Emma-Leena	N/A	Viennese Waltz	"Viini valss" – Orelipoiss
Kati & Marko	N/A	Foxtrot	"Ilus hetk" – Jaan Tätte
Stig & Karina	N/A	Samba	"Pankrot" – Toe Tag
Getter & Ott-Sander	N/A	Rumba	"Me kõik jääme vanaks" – Getter Jaani

== Dance Chart ==
Couple	1	2	3	4		5		6		7		8		
Jan & Aleksandra	Waltz	Samba	Cha-cha-cha	Rumba	Argentine Tango	Foxtrot	Jive	Cha-cha-cha	Viennese Waltz	Paso Doble	Quickstep	Cha-cha-cha	Waltz	Showdance
Anna & Mairold	Cha-cha-cha	Foxtrot	Rumba	Samba	Argentine Tango	Waltz	Jive	Cha-cha-cha	Quickstep	Paso Doble	Viennese Waltz	Samba	Waltz	Showdance
Getter & Ott-Sander	Cha-cha-cha	Foxtrot	Samba	Argentine Tango	Rumba	Quickstep	Jive	Cha-cha-cha	Waltz	Paso Doble	Viennese Waltz			Rumba
Stig & Karina	Waltz	Samba	Cha-cha-cha	Rumba	Argentine Tango	Viennese Waltz	Jive	Cha-cha-cha	Foxtrot					Samba
Kati & Marko	Cha-cha-cha	Foxtrot	Rumba	Argentine Tango	Samba	Waltz	Jive							Foxtrot
Ott & Emma-Leena	Waltz	Samba	Viennese Waltz	Argentine Tango	Cha-cha-cha									Viennese Waltz
Andres & Kristina	Waltz	Samba	Foxtrot											Samba
Veronika & Märt	Cha-cha-cha	Foxtrot												Cha-cha-cha

Highest scoring dance
Lowest scoring dance
Dance performed on the finale by previously eliminated couple
