= Tantsud tähtedega 2007 =

Estonian television series

- Season 2007
- Celebrity winner: Koit Toome
- Professional winner: Kerttu Tänav
- No. of episodes: 8

Release
- Original network: Kanal 2

Season chronology
- ← Previous; Tantsud tähtedega 2006 Next → Tantsud tähtedega 2008

Tantsud tähtedega 2007 was the second season of the Estonian version of Dancing with the Stars, and was broadcast on the Estonian television channel Kanal 2. The hosts were Mart Sander and Merle Liivak. The jury members were Jüri Nael, Kaie Kõrb, Merle Klandorf and Ants Tael.

== Couples ==
Place	Celebrity	Occupation	Professional
1.	Koit Toome	Singer	Kerttu Tänav
2.	Luisa Värk	Singer	Martin Parmas
3.	Peep Vain	Top instructor	Olga Kosmina
4.	Andrus Värnik	Javelin thrower	Kaisa Oja
5.	Dag Hartelius	Swedish ambassador to Estonia	Kristina Tennokese
6.	Kristiina Ojuland	Politician	Aleksandr Makarov
7.	Katrin Karisma	Singer	Veiko Ratas
8.	Beatrice	Model	Eduard Korotin

== Judges’ scoring summary ==
Bold scores indicate the highest for that week. Red indicates the lowest score.

Couple	Week 1	Week 2	Week 3	Week 4	Week 5	Week 6	Week 7	Week 8 Final
Koit & Kerttu	13	25	23	30	36	34+35=69	36+38=74	36+39+38=113
Luisa & Martin	14	20	28	32	36	36+39=75	37+39=76	35+40+39=114
Peep & Olga	17	20	28	29	31	37+36=73	32+40=72	Eliminated
Andrus & Kaisa	15	16	19	30	29	33+33=66	Eliminated	
Dag & Kristina	9	15	21	25	25	Eliminated		
Kristina & Aleksandr	13	23	23	30	Eliminated			
Katrin & Veiko	15	15	18	Eliminated				
Beatrice & Eduard	12	18	Eliminated					

Couple	Week 1	Week 2	Week 3	Week 4	Week 5	Week 6		Week 7		Week 8		
Koit & Kerttu	Waltz (International Standard)	Rumba	Tango	Paso Doble	Samba	Foxtrot	Cha-Cha-Cha	Quickstep	Jive	Quickstep	Samba	Showdance
Luisa & Martin	Cha-Cha-Cha	Quickstep	Jive	Foxtrot	Samba	Waltz (International Standard)	Paso Doble	Tango	Rumba	Foxtrot	Samba	Showdance
Peep & Olga	Cha-Cha-Cha	Quickstep	Jive	Foxtrot	Samba	Tango	Rumba	Waltz (International Standard)	Paso Doble	Eliminated		
Andrus & Kaisa	Cha-Cha-Cha	Quickstep	Jive	Foxtrot	Samba	Tango	Rumba	Eliminated				
Dag & Kristina	Waltz (International Standard)	Rumba	Tango	Paso Doble	Samba	Eliminated						
Kristina & Aleksandr	Cha-Cha-Cha	Quickstep	Jive	Foxtrot	Eliminated							
Katrin & Veiko	Waltz (International Standard)	Rumba	Tango	Eliminated								
Beatrice & Eduard	Waltz (International Standard)	Rumba	Eliminated									

The Best Score (40)

Couple	Dance	Episode
Luisa Vark & Martin Parmas	Samba	8
Peep Vain & Olga Kosmina	Paso Doble	7

Averages

Rank by average	Place	Couple	Average	Total	Best Score	Worst Score
	1.	Koit Toome and Kerttu Tänav		383	39	13
	2.	Luisa Vark and Martin Parmas		395	40	14
	3.	Peep Vain and Olga Kosmina		270	40	17
	4.	Andrus Värnik and Kaisa Oja		175	33	15
	5.	Dag Hartelius and Kristina Tennokese		95	25	9
	6.	Kristina Ojuland and Aleksandr Makarov		89	30	13
	7.	Katrin Karisma and Veiko Ratas		48	18	15
	8.	Beatrice and Eduard Korotin		30	18	12
Everyteam				1485		

== Highest and lowest scoring performances ==
The best and worst performances in each dance according to the judges' marks are as follows:

Dance	Best dancer(s)	Best score	Worst dancer(s)	Worst score
Cha-Cha-Cha	Koit Toome	35	Kristina Ojuland	13
Waltz (International Standard)	Luisa Vark	36	Dag Hartelius	9
Rumba	Luisa Vark	39	Dag Hartelius; Katrin Karisma	15
Quickstep	Koit Toome	36	Andrus Värnik	16
Jive	Koit Toome	38	Andrus Värnik	19
Tango	Luisa Vark; Peep Vain	37	Katrin Karisma	18
Paso Doble	Peep Vain	40	Dag Hartelius	26
Foxtrot	Luisa Vark	35	Andrus Värnik; Kristina Ojuland	30
Samba	Luisa Vark	40	Dag Hartelius	25
Showdance	Luisa Vark	39	Koit Toome	38
