= Tantsud tähtedega 2008 =

Estonian television series

- Season 2008
- Celebrity winner: Argo Ader
- Professional winner: Helena Liiv
- No. of episodes: 8

Release
- Original network: Kanal 2

Season chronology
- ← Previous; Tantsud tähtedega 2007 Next → Tantsud tähtedega 2010

Tantsud tähtedega 2008 was the third season of the Estonian version of Dancing with the Stars, and was broadcast on the Estonian television channel Kanal 2. The hosts were Mart Sander and Gerli Padar, the runner up of the first season. The jury members were Merle Klandord, Ants Teal, Märt Agu and Riina Suhhotskaja.

== Couples ==
Place	Celebrity	Occupation	Professional
1.	Argo Ader	Bodybuilder	Helena Liiv
2.	Maarja-Liis Ilus	Singer	Veiko Ratas
3.	Lauri Pedaja	Actor, Hairdresser	Kristina Tennokese
4.	Evelyn Sepp	Politician	Marko Kiigajaan
5.	Henrik Normann	Actor	Kaisa Oja
6.	Piret Järvis	Singer	Mairold Millert
7.	Erika Salumäe	Track Cyclist, Politician	Kristjan Kuusk
8.	Arne Niit	Designer	Olga Kosmina

== Judges’ scoring summary ==
Bold scores indicate the highest for that week. Red indicates the lowest score.

Couple	Week 1	Week 2	Week 3	Week 4	Week 5	Week 6	Week 7	Week 8 Final
Argo & Helena	21	27	27	31	32	34+32=66	40+34=74	37+40+40=117
Maarja-Liis & Veiko	19	25	29	31	36	40+34=74	37+36=73	40+37+40=117
Lauri & Kristina	21	18	26	31	32	35+39=74	33+36=69	Eliminated
Evelyn & Marko	16	21	28	28	29	34+28=62	Eliminated	
Henrik & Kaisa	14	16	24	25	26	Eliminated		
Piret & Mairold	14	16	27	26	Eliminated			
Erika & Kristjan	20	19	26	Eliminated				
Arne & Olga	14	15	Eliminated					

Couple	Week 1	Week 2	Week 3	Week 4	Week 5	Week 6		Week 7		Week 8		
Argo & Helena	Waltz (International Standard)	Rumba	Tango	Paso Doble	Samba	Foxtrot	Jive	Quickstep	Cha-Cha-Cha	Quickstep	Rumba	Showdance
Maarja-Liis & Veiko	Cha-Cha-Cha	Quickstep	Jive	Foxtrot	Samba	Waltz (International Standard)	Paso Doble	Tango	Rumba	Quickstep	Samba	Showdance
Lauri & Kristina	Cha-Cha-Cha	Quickstep	Jive	Foxtrot	Samba	Tango	Rumba	Waltz	Paso Doble	Eliminated		
Evelyn & Marko	Waltz (International Standard)	Rumba	Tango	Paso Doble	Samba	Foxtrot	Cha-Cha-Cha	Eliminated				
Henrik & Kaisa	Cha-Cha-Cha	Quickstep	Jive	Foxtrot	Samba	Eliminated						
Piret & Mairold	Cha-Cha-Cha	Quickstep	Jive	Foxtrot	Eliminated							
Erika & Kristjan	Waltz (International Standard)	Rumba	Tango	Eliminated								
Arne & Olga	Waltz (International Standard)	Rumba	Eliminated									

The Best Score (40)

Couple	Dance	Episode
Argo Ader & Helena Liiv	Quickstep	7
Argo Ader & Helena Liiv	Rumba	8
Argo Ader & Helena Liiv	Showdance	8
Maarja-Liis Ilus & Veiko Ratas	Waltz	6
Maarja-Liis Ilus & Veiko Ratas	Quickstep	8
Maarja-Liis Ilus & Veiko Ratas	Showdance	8

== Highest and lowest scoring performances ==
The best and worst performances in each dance according to the judges' marks are as follows:

Dance	Best dancer(s)	Best score	Worst dancer(s)	Worst score
Cha-Cha-Cha	Argo Ader	34	Henrik Normann; Piret Järvis	14
Waltz (International Standard)	Maarja-Liis Ilus	40	Arne Niit	14
Rumba	Argo Ader	40	Arne Niit	15
Quickstep	Argo Ader; Maarja-Liis Ilus	40	Henrik Normann; Piret Järvis	16
Jive	Argo Ader	32	Henrik Normann	24
Tango	Maarja-Liis Ilus	37	Erika Salumäe	26
Paso Doble	Lauri Pedaja	36	Evelyn Sepp	28
Foxtrot	Argo Ader; Evelyn Sepp	34	Henrik Normann	25
Samba	Maarja-Liis Ilus	37	Henrik Normann	26
Showdance	Argo Ader; Maarja-Liis Ilus	40	-	-
