= Tantsud tähtedega 2010 =

Estonian television series

- Season 2010
- Celebrity winner: Liina Vahter
- Professional winner: Mairold Millert
- No. of episodes: 8

Release
- Original network: Kanal 2
- Original release: 10 October – 5 December 2010

Season chronology
- ← Previous; Tantsud tähtedega 2008 Next → Tantsud tähtedega 2011

Tantsud tähtedega 2010 is the fourth season of the Estonian version of Dancing with the Stars, and was broadcast on the Estonian television channel Kanal 2 starting on 10 October. The hosts were Mart Sander and Kaisa Oja. The jury members were Ants Tael, Merle Klandorf and Jüri Nael.

== Couples ==
| Celebrity | Occupation | Professional partner | Status |
|---|---|---|---|
| Tarmo Kruusimäe | Politician, former punk singer | Karin Lillemaa | Eliminated 1st on 17 October 2010 |
| Dave Benton | Singer | Valeria Fetissova | Eliminated 2nd on 24 October 2010 |
| Urve Palo | Former Minister of Population and Ethnic Affairs | Aleksandr Makarov | Eliminated 3rd on 31 October 2010 |
| Johannes Ahun | Surfer, Musician | Kerstin Kruuse | Eliminated 4th on 7 November 2010 |
| Jevgeni Fokin | Stylist | Aleksandra Žeregelja | Eliminated 5th on 14 November 2010 |
| Nastja | Clairvoyant | Marko Mehine | Third Place on 21 November 2010 |
| Ithaka Maria Rahula | Singer, Eesti otsib superstaari host | Marko Kiigajaan | Second Place on 5 December 2010 |
| Liina Vahter | Haidresser, amateur actress | Mairold Millert | Winners on 5 December 2010 |

== Scores ==
| Couple | Place | 1 | 2 | 1+2 | 3 | 4 | 5 | 6 | 7 | 8 |
|---|---|---|---|---|---|---|---|---|---|---|
| Liina & Mairold | 1 | 7 | 15 | 22 | 18 | 17 | 19 | 21+26=47 | 28+27=55 | 28+29+30=87 |
| Ithaka Maria & Marko | 2 | 12 | 14 | 26 | 18 | 19 | 27 | 23+27=50 | 30+30=60 | 27+30+30=87 |
| Nastja & Marko | 3 | 9 | 14 | 23 | 14 | 20 | 16 | 23+22=45 | 24+28=52 | |
| Jevgeni & Aleksandra | 4 | 11 | 16 | 27 | 16 | 17 | 20 | 23+29=52 | | |
| Johannes & Kerstin | 5 | 15 | 17 | 32 | 14 | 21 | 22 | | | |
| Urve & Aleksandr | 6 | 11 | 13 | 24 | 14 | 18 | | | | |
| Dave & Valeria | 7 | 12 | 13 | 25 | 15 | | | | | |
| Tarmo & Karin | 8 | 11 | 10 | 21 | | | | | | |

Red numbers indicate the lowest score for each week.
Green numbers indicate the highest score for each week.
indicates the couple eliminated that week.
indicates the winning couple.
indicates the runners-up.

== Songs and Individual Scoring ==
=== Week 1 ===
Individual judges scores in charts below (given in parentheses) are listed in this order from left to right: Ants Tael, Merle Klandorf and Jüri Nael.

Running order

| Couple | Score | Style | Music |
|---|---|---|---|
| Nastja & Marko | 9 (3,3,3) | Cha-Cha-Cha | "Gitar" – Peter Nalitch |
| Ithaka Maria & Marko | 12 (4,4,4) | Waltz | "Nii sind ootan" – Ithaka Maria |
| Jevgeni & Aleksandra | 11 (4,3,4) | Cha-Cha-Cha | "Don't Stop the Music" – Rihanna |
| Johannes & Kerstin | 15 (5,5,5) | Waltz | |
| Tarmo & Karin | 11 (3,4,4) | Cha-Cha-Cha | |
| Liina & Mairold | 7 (2,2,3) | Waltz | "See the Day" – Dee C. Lee |
| Urve & Aleksandr | 11 (4,3,4) | Cha-Cha-Cha | "Perhaps, Perhaps, Perhaps" – Doris Day |
| Dave & Valeria | 12 (4,4,4) | Waltz | "Je suis malade" – Lara Fabian |

=== Week 2 ===
Individual judges scores in charts below (given in parentheses) are listed in this order from left to right: Ants Tael, Merle Klandorf and Jüri Nael.

Running order

| Couple | Score | Style | Music |
|---|---|---|---|
| Urve & Aleksandr | 13 (4,4,5) | Quickstep | "Never Ever Let You Go" – Rollo & King |
| Johannes & Kerstin | 17 (6,5,6) | Rumba | "Sinu hääl" – Liisi Koikson |
| Tarmo & Karin | 10 (3,3,4) | Quickstep | "Sleepy Maggie" – Ashley MacIsaac |
| Dave & Valeria | 13 (4,4,5) | Rumba | "Smile" – Nat King Cole |
| Jevgeni & Aleksandra | 16 (5,5,6) | Quickstep | "Mr. Zoot Suit" – The Flying Neutrinos |
| Ithaka Maria & Marko | 14 (5,4,5) | Rumba | "I've Got To See You Again" – Norah Jones |
| Nastja & Marko | 14 (4,4,6) | Quickstep | "Fairytale" – Alexander Rybak |
| Liina & Mairold | 15 (4,4,7) | Rumba | "Satisfy My Soul" – Paul Carrack |

=== Week 3 ===
Individual judges scores in charts below (given in parentheses) are listed in this order from left to right: Ants Tael, Merle Klandorf and Jüri Nael.

Running order

| Couple | Score | Style | Music |
|---|---|---|---|
| Jevgeni & Aleksandra | 16 (6,5,5) | Jive | "Do You Love Me" – The Contours |
| Dave & Valeria | 15 (4,6,5) | Tango | "Milonga de Amor" – Gotan Project |
| Liina & Mairold | 18 (6,6,6) | Tango | "Roxanne" – The Police |
| Urve & Aleksandr | 14 (5,4,5) | Jive | "Greased Lightnin'" – from Grease |
| Ithaka Maria & Marko | 18 (6,5,7) | Tango | "Así Se Baila El Tango" – Veronica Verdier |
| Nastja & Marko | 14 (5,4,5) | Jive | "Jailhouse Rock" – Elvis Presley |
| Johannes & Kerstin | 14 (4,4,6) | Tango | "Cell Block Tango" – from Chicago |

=== Week 4 ===
Individual judges scores in charts below (given in parentheses) are listed in this order from left to right: Ants Tael, Merle Klandorf and Jüri Nael.

Running order

| Couple | Score | Style | Music |
|---|---|---|---|
| Johannes & Kerstin | 21 (7,7,7) | Paso Doble | "Theme from Armageddon" – Trevor Rabin "España cañí" – Pascual Marquina Narro |
| Nastja & Marko | 20 (6,6,8) | Foxtrot | "If You Were Gone" – Alexander Rybak |
| Ithaka Maria & Marko | 19 (6,6,7) | Paso Doble | "The Unforgiven" – Apocalyptica |
| Urve & Aleksandr | 18 (6,6,6) | Foxtrot | "Mandy" – Westlife |
| Liina & Mairold | 17 (6,4,7) | Paso Doble | "España cañí" – Pascual Marquina Narro |
| Jevgeni & Aleksandra | 17 (5,5,7) | Foxtrot | "I Wanna Be Loved by You" – Marilyn Monroe |

=== Week 5 ===
Individual judges scores in charts below (given in parentheses) are listed in this order from left to right: Ants Tael, Merle Klandorf and Jüri Nael.

Running order

| Couple | Score | Style | Music |
|---|---|---|---|
| Liina & Mairold | 19 (6,6,7) | Samba | "Mysterious Girl" – Peter Andre |
| Jevgeni & Aleksandra | 20 (7,6,7) | Samba | "María" – Ricky Martin |
| Johannes & Kerstin | 22 (7,7,8) | Samba | "Mas que Nada" – Sérgio Mendes & The Black Eyed Peas |
| Ithaka Maria & Marko | 27 (9,9,9) | Samba | "I Still Haven't Found What I'm Looking For" – U2 |
| Nastja & Marko | 16 (5,5,6) | Samba | "Swing da Cor" – Daniela Mercury |

=== Week 6 ===
Individual judges scores in charts below (given in parentheses) are listed in this order from left to right: Ants Tael, Merle Klandorf and Jüri Nael.

Running order

| Couple | Score | Style | Music |
|---|---|---|---|
| Ithaka Maria & Marko | 23 (7,8,8) | Foxtrot | "Kui on meri hülgehall" – Lenna Kuurmaa |
| Ithaka Maria & Marko | 27 (9,9,9) | Cha-cha-cha | "Smells Like Teen Spirit" – Nirvana |
| Nastja & Marko | 23 (7,8,8) | Waltz | "Childhood" – Michael Jackson |
| Nastja & Marko | 22 (7,7,8) | Rumba | "Will You Still Love Me Tomorrow" – Amy Winehouse |
| Liina & Mairold | 21 (7,6,8) | Quickstep | "We No Speak Americano" – Yolanda Be Cool & DCUP |
| Liina & Mairold | 26 (9,7,10) | Cha-cha-cha | "Poker Face" – Lady Gaga |
| Jevgeni & Aleksandra | 23 (8,7,8) | Waltz | "Dark Waltz" – Hayley Westenra |
| Jevgeni & Aleksandra | 29 (10,9,10) | Paso Doble | |

=== Week 7 ===
Individual judges scores in charts below (given in parentheses) are listed in this order from left to right: Ants Tael, Merle Klandorf and Jüri Nael.

Running order

| Couple | Score | Style | Music |
|---|---|---|---|
| Nastja & Marko | 24 (8,8,8) | Tango | "Tagametsa tango" – Hanna-Liina Võsa |
| Nastja & Marko | 28 (9,10,9) | Paso Doble | "Koit" – Tõnis Mägi |
| Liina & Mairold | 28 (10,9,9) | Waltz | "Kas tead" – Helen |
| Liina & Mairold | 27 (10,7,10) | Jive | "Läbi öise Tallinna" – Ott Lepland |
| Ithaka Maria & Marko | 30 (10,10,10) | Quickstep | "Palun lenda sirgelt" – Koit Toome |
| Ithaka Maria & Marko | 30 (10,10,10) | Jive | "Anna mulle end" – Genialistid |

=== Week 8 ===
Individual judges scores in charts below (given in parentheses) are listed in this order from left to right: Ants Tael, Merle Klandorf and Jüri Nael.

Running order

| Couple | Score | Style | Music |
|---|---|---|---|
| Ithaka Maria & Marko | 27 (9,9,9) | Waltz | "Nii sind ootan" – Ithaka Maria |
| Ithaka Maria & Marko | 30 (10,10,10) | Samba | "I Still Haven't Found What I'm Looking For" – U2 |
| Ithaka Maria & Marko | 30 (10,10,10) | Showdance | "Jingle Bells" – James Lord Pierpont "Appi! Ma vajan armastust" – Vennaskond |
| Liina & Mairold | 28 (9,9,10) | Tango | "Roxanne" – The Police |
| Liina & Mairold | 29 (10,9,10) | Rumba | "Satisfy My Soul" – Paul Carrack |
| Liina & Mairold | 30 (10,10,10) | Showdance | "Zombie" – The Cranberries |

== Average Chart ==
| Rank by average | Place | Couple | Average | Total | Best Score | Worst Score |
|---|---|---|---|---|---|---|
| 1. | 2. | Ithaka Maria Rahula & Marko Kiigajaan | 24 | 287 | 30 | 12 |
| 2. | 1. | Liina Vahter & Mairold Millert | 22 | 265 | 30 | 7 |
| 3. | 3. | Nastja & Marko Mehine | 19 | 170 | 28 | 9 |
| 4. | 4. | Jevgeni Fokin & Aleksandra Žeregelja | 19 | 132 | 29 | 11 |
| 5. | 5. | Johannes Ahun & Kerstin Kruuse | 18 | 89 | 22 | 14 |
| 6. | 6. | Urve Palo & Aleksandr Makarov | 14 | 56 | 18 | 11 |
| 7. | 7. | Dave Benton & Valeria Fetissova | 13 | 40 | 15 | 12 |
| 8. | 8. | Tarmo Kruusimäe & Karin Lillemaa | 11 | 21 | 11 | 10 |
| Total | | | 20 | 1060 | | |

== Couples' highest and lowest scoring dances ==
| Couples | Averages | Best Dances | Worst Dances |
|---|---|---|---|
| Ithaka Maria & Marko | 23.9 | Quickstep, Jive, Samba, Showdance (30) | Waltz (12) |
| Liina & Mairold | 22.0 | Showdance (30) | Waltz (7) |
| Nastja & Marko | 18.9 | Paso Doble (28) | Cha-Cha-Cha (9) |
| Jevgeni & Aleksandra | 18.9 | Paso Doble (29) | Cha-Cha-Cha (11) |
| Johannes & Kerstin | 17.8 | Samba (22) | Tango (14) |
| Urve & Aleksandr | 14.0 | Foxtrot (18) | Cha-Cha-Cha (11) |
| Dave & Valeria | 13.3 | Tango (15) | Waltz (12) |
| Tarmo & Karin | 10.5 | Cha-Cha-Cha (11) | Quickstep (10) |

== Highest and lowest scoring performances ==
The best and worst performances in each dance according to the judges' marks are as follows:

| Dance | Best dancer | Best score | Worst dancer | Worst score |
|---|---|---|---|---|
| Cha-Cha-Cha | Ithaka Maria Rahula | 27 | Nastja | 9 |
| Waltz | Liina Vahter | 28 | Liina Vahter | 7 |
| Rumba | Liina Vahter | 29 | Dave Benton | 13 |
| Quickstep | Ithaka Maria Rahula | 30 | Tarmo Kruusimäe | 10 |
| Jive | Ithaka Maria Rahula | 30 | Nastja; Urve Palo | 14 |
| Tango | Liina Vahter | 28 | Johannes Ahun | 14 |
| Paso Doble | Jevgeni Fokin | 29 | Liina Vahter | 17 |
| Foxtrot | Ithaka Maria Rahula | 23 | Jevgeni Fokin | 17 |
| Samba | Ithaka Maria Rahula | 30 | Nastja | 16 |
| Showdance | Ithaka Maria Rahula; Liina Vahter | 30 | – | – |

== Dance Chart ==
| Couple | Week 1 | Week 2 | Week 3 | Week 4 | Week 5 | Week 6 | | Week 7 | | Week 8 Final | | |
|---|---|---|---|---|---|---|---|---|---|---|---|---|
| Liina & Mairold | Waltz | Rumba | Tango | Paso Doble | Samba | Quickstep | Cha-Cha-Cha | Waltz | Jive | Tango | Rumba | Showdance |
| Ithaka Maria & Marko | Waltz | Rumba | Tango | Paso Doble | Samba | Foxtrot | Cha-Cha-Cha | Quickstep | Jive | Waltz | Samba | Showdance |
| Nastja & Marko | Cha-Cha-Cha | Quickstep | Jive | Foxtrot | Samba | Waltz | Rumba | Tango | Paso Doble | | | |
| Jevgeni & Aleksandra | Cha-Cha-Cha | Quickstep | Jive | Foxtrot | Samba | Waltz | Paso Doble | | | | | |
| Johannes & Kerstin | Waltz | Rumba | Tango | Paso Doble | Samba | | | | | | | |
| Urve & Aleksandr | Cha-Cha-Cha | Quickstep | Jive | Foxtrot | | | | | | | | |
| Dave & Valeria | Waltz | Rumba | Tango | | | | | | | | | |
| Tarmo & Karin | Cha-Cha-Cha | Quickstep | | | | | | | | | | |

Highest scoring dance
Lowest scoring dance
