= Toomast =

Toomast is an Estonian surname. Notable people with the surname include:

- Taimo Toomast (1962–2025), Estonian opera singer
- Vilja Toomast (born 1962), Estonian politician
