= Tantsud tähtedega 2006 =

Estonian television series

- Season 2006
- Celebrity winner: Mikk Saar
- Professional winner: Olga Kosmina
- No. of episodes: 8

Release
- Original network: Kanal 2

Season chronology
- Next → Tantsud tähtedega 2007

Tantsud tähtedega 2006 was the first season of the Estonian version of Dancing with the Stars, and was broadcast on the Estonian television channel Kanal 2. The hosts were Mart Sander and Kristiina Heinmets-Aigro. The jury members were Jüri Nael, Kaie Kõrb, Merle Klandorf and Ants Tael.

== Couples ==
Place	Celebrity	Occupation	Professional
1.	Mikk Saar	Singer	Olga Kosmina
2.	Gerli Padar	Singer	Martin Parmas
3.	Erki Nool	Athlete, Olympic gold medalist	Ave Vardja
4.	Aivar Riisalu	Businessman, Singer	Kristina Tennokese
5.	Vilja Savisaar	Politician	Veiko Ratas
6.	Ingrid Tähismaa	Journalist	Aleksandr Makarov
7.	Reet Linna	Singer, TV host	Eduard Korotin
8.	Indrek Tarand	Politician	Kaisa Oja

== Judges' scoring summary ==
Bold scores indicate the highest for that week. Red indicates the lowest score.

Couple	Week 1	Week 2	Week 3	Week 4	Week 5	Week 6	Week 7	Week 8 Final
Mikk & Olga	22	27	32	36	32	36+36=72	40+40=80	37+39+40=116
Gerli & Martin	19	28	34	32	38	38+38=76	40+37=77	36+39+40=115
Erki & Ave	17	20	28	29	30	28+36=64	37+38=75	Eliminated
Aivar & Kristina	12	16	26	24	20	28+27=55	Eliminated	
Vilja & Veiko	20	15	22	26	21	Eliminated		
Ingrid & Aleksandr	19	23	28	26	Eliminated			
Reet & Eduard	13	19	26	Eliminated				
Indrek & Kaisa	14	19	Eliminated					

Couple	Week 1	Week 2	Week 3	Week 4	Week 5	Week 6		Week 7		Week 8		
Mikk & Olga	Waltz	Rumba	Tango	Paso Doble	Samba	Foxtrot	Jive	Cha-Cha-Cha	Quickstep	Tango	Paso Doble	Showdance
Gerli & Martin	Cha-Cha-Cha	Quickstep	Jive	Foxtrot	Samba	Waltz	Rumba	Paso Doble	Tango	Quickstep	Samba	Showdance
Erki & Ave	Cha-Cha-Cha	Quickstep	Jive	Foxtrot	Samba	Waltz	Paso Doble	Rumba	Tango	Eliminated		
Aivar & Kristina	Cha-Cha-Cha	Quickstep	Jive	Foxtrot	Samba	Waltz	Paso Doble	Eliminated				
Vilja & Veiko	Waltz	Rumba	Tango	Paso Doble	Samba	Eliminated						
Ingrid & Aleksandr	Cha-Cha-Cha	Quickstep	Jive	Foxtrot	Eliminated							
Reet & Eduard	Waltz	Rumba	Tango	Eliminated								
Indrek & Kaisa	Waltz	Rumba	Eliminated									

The Best Score (40)

Couple	Dance	Episode
Mikk Saar & Olga Kosmina	Cha-Cha-Cha	7
Mikk Saar & Olga Kosmina	Quickstep	7
Mikk Saar & Olga Kosmina	Showdance	8
Gerli Padar & Martin Parmas	Paso Doble	7
Gerli Padar & Martin Parmas	Showdance	8

Averages

Rank by average	Place	Couple	Average	Total	Best Score	Worst Score
1.	2.	Gerli Padar & Martin Parmas	35	419	40	19
2.	1.	Mikk Saar & Olga Kosmina	35	417	40	22
3.	3.	Erki Nool & Ave Vardja	29	263	38	17
4.	6.	Ingrid Tähismaa & Aleksandr Makarov	24	96	28	19
5.	4.	Aivar Riisalu & Kristina Tennokese	22	153	28	12
6.	5.	Vilja Savisaar & Veiko Ratas	21	104	26	15
7.	7.	Reet Linna & Eduard Korotin	19	58	26	13
8.	8.	Indrek Tarand & Kaisa Oja	17	33	19	14
Everyteam			29	1543		

== Highest and lowest scoring performances ==
The best and worst performances in each dance according to the judges' marks are as follows:

Dance	Best dancer(s)	Best score	Worst dancer(s)	Worst score
Cha-Cha-Cha	Mikk Saar	40	Aivar Riisalu	12
Waltz (International Standard)	Gerli Padar	38	Reet Linna	13
Rumba	Gerli Padar	38	Vilja Savisaar	15
Quickstep	Mikk Saar	40	Aivar Riisalu	16
Jive	Mikk Saar	36	Aivar Riisalu	26
Tango	Erki Nool	38	Vilja Savisaar	22
Paso Doble	Gerli Padar	40	Vilja Savisaar	26
Foxtrot	Mikk Saar	36	Aivar Riisalu	24
Samba	Gerli Padar	39	Aivar Riisalu	14
Showdance	Mikk Saar; Gerli Padar	40	-	-
