= Ühikarotid =

Estonian television series

- Genre: Teen drama
- Created by: Martin Algus
- Directed by: Ergo Kuld
- Starring: Lauri Pedaja; Ivo Reinok; Roger Stahlman; Ragnar Uustal; Liina Vahter; Johanna-Maria Parv; Kirsti Villard
- Theme music composer: Röövel Ööbik
- Opening theme: "Kids Stuff Rock"
- Country of origin: Estonia
- Original language: Estonian
- No. of seasons: 2
- No. of episodes: 46

Production
- Producer: Tuuli Roosma
- Running time: 45 minutes

Original release
- Network: Kanal 2
- Release: 8 October 2010 – 10 May 2012

Ühikarotid is an Estonian teen drama TV series that airs on Kanal 2. The series first aired on 8 March 2010. It is written by Martin Algus and produced by Tuuli Roosma. It is about students from different Estonian locations who spend their time in a student's dormitory in Tallinn.

The soundtrack of the series featured music from several Estonian musicians, and the 2010 compilation album included the following artists: Röövel Ööbik & Allan Jakob, Toe Tag, Claire's Birthday, Monstercöuq, Erko Niit, Picnic, Turbosound, Mushy, Kurjam, A-Rühm, Opium Flirt, Laika Virgin, 2015, Barbariz, Ultramelanhool, Kosmikud, Imandra Lake, Itk, Sinine, Penrose, Orelipoiss.

== Cast ==
| Played by | Character |
|---|---|
| Lauri Pedaja | Kustav "Staff" |
| Ivo Reinok | Andri |
| Roger Stahlman | Pauli "Tibu" |
| Ragnar Uustal | Neeme |
| Liina Raud | Viktoria "Vika" |
| Johanna-Maria Parv | Marion |
| Kirsti Villard | Iiris |
| Kevin Väljaots | Virgo "Vigri" |
| Salme Poopuu | receptionist lady Salme |
| Paul Laasik | housemaster |
| Doris Kristina Raave | Kätlin |
| Martin Algus | drug dealer |
| Liina Tennosaar | Andri's mother |
| Tiina Tõnis | Pauli's mother |
| Peeter Kaljumäe | Pauli's father |
| Egon Nuter | Direktor |
