= Veronika Portsmuth =

Estonian conductor and singer

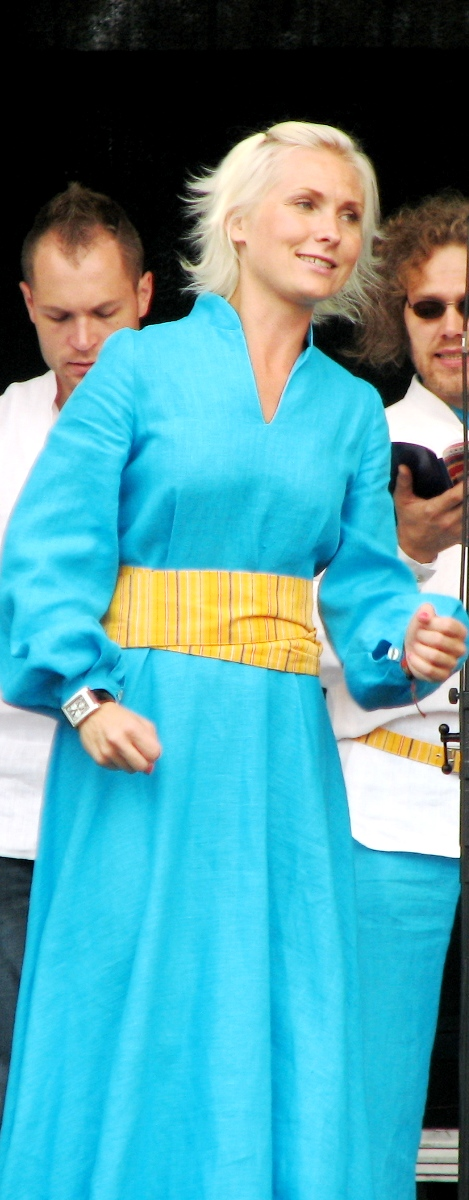
Veronika Portsmuth, 2011

Veronika Portsmuth (born 27 November 1980 in Tallinn, Estonia) is an Estonian conductor and singer.

== Childhood ==
Portsmuth started singing at the age of 3, when she started as one of the soloists in Ave Kumpas singing studio. During that period she performed in many TV music programmes for children.

== Education ==
- 1987–1995 21. Tallinn Secondary School
- 1995–1998 Tallinn Music High School (conducting – Evi Eespere)
- 1998–2004 Estonian Music Academy, MA (conducting – Prof. Emeritus Kuno Areng)
- 1999–2002 Tallinn Georg Ots Music School (singing – Mare Jõgeva)
- 2002–2004 Estonian Music Academy (singing – Prof. Nadja Kurem)
- 2007–present Estonian Academy of Music and Theatre, PhD programme (Tõnu Kaljuste)
- 2008–2009 Royal College of Music in Stockholm (Prof. Anders Eby)

Further training in orchestral conducting by Jüri Alperten and Michael Bartoch, participation in conducting project led by Cecilia Rydingen-Alin, master classes by Eri Klas and Filippo Maria Bressan.

== Professional work ==
- 1998–2004 Mixed Choir Helitron
- 2000–2002 Chamber Choir of Tallinn University of Technology (choirmaster)
- 2002–2004 Tallinn Chamber Choir
- 2002–2004 Estonian Philharmonic Chamber Choir (singer)
- 2004–2008 Nargen Opera choir
- 2004– ... Estonian Defence Forces Mixed Choir
- 2005 Estonian Academy of Science Female Choir
- 2006–2007 Tallinn Music High School Chamber Choir
- 2008– ... Young Female Choir MIINA
- 2010– ... Estonian Concert Choir
- 2010– ... Mixed Choir of the Estonian Music and Theatre (assistant-conductor)

== Working with the Estonian Concert Choir ==
The Estonian Concert Choir was formed in June 2010 to perform oratorios and other big vocal compositions (with orchestra). The choir works on project basis. Portsmuth has been working with the choir from its very beginning.

Projects:

- 2010 – Veljo Tormis, Eesti ballaadid (Estonian ballads), conductor Tõnu Kaljuste
- 2010 – Johannes Brahms, Ein Deutsches Requiem, conductor Neeme Järvi
- 2010 – Gija Kantšeli 75, conductor Andres Mustonen
- 2011 – Dieterich Buxtehude, Giovanni Gabrieli, Michael Praetorius and other works for two choirs setting (in Saint Petersburg's St. John's church), conductor Andres Mustonen
- 2011 – Ludwig van Beethoven, oratorio Christus am Ölberge, conductor Paul Mägi
- 2011 – Gustav Mahler, Symphony No. 3 (choir's female section), conductor Nikolai Aleksejev
- 2011 – John Adams, oratorio El Niño, conductor Tõnu Kaljuste
- 2012 – Dmitri Shostakovich cantatas Song of the Forests, The Sun Shines on Our Motherland, conductor Paavo Järvi

== Academic work ==
Portsmuth has been teaching choir conducting and vocal training from 2005 in Tallinn Music Highschool. Since 2010 she is teaching conducting in the Estonian Academy of Music and Theatre.

== Interest in Nordic culture and arts ==
Portsmuth is focused on Nordic culture and contemporary music. In September 2008 she presented in Tallinn the first Faroese opera The Madman's Garden by Sunleif Rasmussen.

She has created a series of concerts with the overall Nordic theme, where Nordic contemporary choir music has been performed.

- 2003 – "Põhjala piisad" (Nordic raindrops), Tallinn Chamber Choir
- 2004 – Nordic contemporary choir music in Vaal Gallery, Tallinn Chamber Choir
- 2008 – "Vihmast ja enesest" (About the rain and myself), Nargen Opera Choir, Mixed Choir of the Estonian Academy of Music and Theatre and vocal group I.C.E.
- 2010 – "Päike läbi tuhapilve" (Sun through the dustcloud), vocal group I.C.E., female choir MIINA and NordArt Ensemble
- 2012 – "Armastusest ja enesest" (About love and myself), Mixed Choir of the European Capital of Culture, female choir MIINA and male ensemble KARL, the Mixed Choir of the Estonian Academy of Music and Theatre and the Chamber Orchestra of the Estonian Academy of Music and Theatre.

== Song Celebrations ==
In July 2007 Portsmuth conducted the mixed choirs section in the 10th Estonian Youth Song Celebration (work by Olav Ehala "Ma tahan olla öö...").

In 2009 at the XXV Song Celebration "Üheshingamine" ("To Breathe as One") Portsmuth conducted mixed choir sections a cappella work by Piret Rips-Laul "Mehed ja naised" ("Men and women"), which was specially composed for the event.

In 2011 Portsmuth was the artistic director of the Estonian 11th Youth Song Celebration "The Wide World begins in a Small Land".

== Other ==
In 2011, Portsmuth participated as a celebrity contestant on the fifth season of Tantsud tähtedega, an Estonian version of Dancing with the Stars. Her professional dancing partner was Märt Agu.
