= Helitron (choir) =

Estonian choir

Helitron is a mixed choir operating in Tallinn and originally set up to cater to employees of Tondi Elektroonika. Of the employment-related choirs established during Soviet occupation of Estonia, Helitron was one of the most famous ones, and is one of the few ones who have outlived the USSR.

A number of people who participated in the Singing Revolution in musical rôles have at some point in their life been involved with Helitron, as either a singer in it, or as a conductor or arranger.

== Repertory ==
The choir has been singing baroque and religious music and is also known for its chamber music performances. Before the dissolution of Soviet Union, it also performed Soviet music.

On 1 May 1975, Helitron was the first choir to perform Mõistatused (Estonian for Puzzles), an orchestral piece based on Estonian folk songs by Ester Mägi. This performance was conducted by Harald-Peter Siiak.

== Conductors ==
In 1964, Harald-Peter Siiak became the chief conductor of Helitron.

In 1998–2004, the chief conductor of Helitron was Veronika Portsmuth.
