= The Class (2007 film) =

2007 film

- DVD cover
- Estonian: Klass
- Directed by: Ilmar Raag
- Written by: Ilmar Raag
- Produced by: Ilmar Raag; Riina Sildos
- Starring: Vallo Kirs; Pärt Uusberg; Lauri Pedaja; Paula Solvak
- Cinematography: Kristjan-Jaak Nuudi
- Edited by: Tambet Tasuja
- Music by: Martin Kallasvee; Paul Oja; Timo Steiner
- Distributed by: Estonian Culture Film
- Release date: 16 March 2007
- Running time: 98 minutes
- Country: Estonia
- Language: Estonian
- Box office: $7,205

The Class (Estonian: Klass) is a 2007 Estonian drama film directed by Ilmar Raag. Themed on school violence, it was released on March 16, 2007. A 7-episode series called Class: Life After (Estonian: Klass: Elu pärast, which can also be translated as "Class: For Life/Life After") was later produced, telling what happens after the initial movie.

== Plot ==
Joosep Raak is an Estonian teenager who is being bullied by his entire high school class. The bullying is spearheaded by Anders, his accomplice Paul, and three other friends: Toomas, Tiit, and Olav. Classmate Kaspar Kordes decides to defend and help Joosep, which does not sit well with the whole class; Kaspar becomes separated from the group. Kaspar's love interest Thea becomes distant from him and this begins to worry him, but he continues to defend Joosep.

Joosep's teacher Laine sends Paul to the headmistress’s office after he steals Joosep’s notebook. Paul frames Kaspar for harassment, and Joosep’s parents are alerted. Joosep's father Margus confronts him about the accusation of Kaspar bullying him, and Joosep dismissively reveals that it's the whole class, which angers Margus. He tells Joosep to act like a “real man” and fight the ringleader of the crowd as he believes it is the only way to stop somebody from bullying him.

Anders asks Kaspar to meet him in the school playground after class. Paul, Toomas, Tiit, and Olav appear with a restrained Joosep and lock Kaspar in a burned down shed where they force him to watch as they take turns to hit Joosep. Before leaving off, Anders tells Kaspar that if he continues to defend Joosep, it will only earn Joosep worse beatings. Joosep goes to Kaspar's apartment complex, where he informs Kaspar that he wishes for him to stop defending him. A concerned Kaspar asks what Joosep will do and suggests that he could shoot the school.

Thea becomes saddened and angered when the class starts believing that in a homophobic atmosphere, Joosep and Kaspar are ridiculed for supposedly having gay feelings for each other. Kaspar becomes stressed by this and tries to talk Thea down about it but she starts believing that Kaspar cares more about Joosep than her and leaves him.

When returning home from school, Joosep's mother Liina discovers heavy bruises on his chest as well as a cut on his chin; she demands to know what is happening, but he refuses to tell. Liina informs the school administration and at last, the class as a whole is rightly blamed. When Laine confronts the class about the claim, Joosep enters his home crying. Margus tries to encourage his son to fight back.

Out of revenge, the class tricks Kaspar and Joosep into meeting at a beach using forged emails. Once there, they make Thea confess to Kaspar that she is no longer with him in front of the whole crowd which sets him off, and he beats Anders to the ground only to have a knife pulled on him. They all then force Kaspar to fellate Joosep at knifepoint and photograph the sexual act.

That night, Joosep steals guns from Margus's gun safe while he is asleep. Joosep equips Kaspar with weapons and the boys enter the school, shooting the cafeteria. While trying to shoot Anders, Kaspar accidentally shoots an eighth-grade student. Anders and Paul manage to restrain him and take his rifle; however, Kaspar saves Joosep by shooting Paul in the head. Just before Anders can reach the exit, he is shot in the shoulder, and is executed by Joosep. Joosep goes to finish Thea, but Kaspar decides to spare her. Joosep and Kaspar, facing one another, each aim a gun at their own head, and decide to commit suicide together. Joosep pulls the trigger, but Kaspar is unable to kill himself, standing in the cafeteria alone.

== Cast ==
- Vallo Kirs – Kaspar Kordes
- Pärt Uusberg – Joosep Rääk
- Lauri Pedaja – Anders Allikmäe
- Paula Solvak – Thea Tooming
- Mikk Mägi – Paul Mägi
- Riina Ries – Riina Pajumets
- Joonas Paas – Toomas Sinijärv
- Kadi Metsla – Kati Kass
- Triin Tenso – Kerli
- Virgo Ernits – Tiit Vaher
- Saara Kadak – Liisa Kadak
- Karl Sakrits – Olav Neeme
- Laine Mägi – Laine, teacher
- Leila Säälik – Liidia, Kaspar's grandmother
- Margus Prangel – Margus, Joosep's father
- Tiina Rebane – Joosep's mother
- Merle Jääger – History teacher
- Marje Metsur – Literature teacher
- Kaie Mihkelson – School headmistress

== Critical reception ==
It currently holds an 89% approval rating among users on Rotten Tomatoes.

== Awards ==
In 2007, The Class received an award from Karlovy Vary International Film Festival and Warsaw International Film Festival. The film was also the official Estonian submission to the Best Foreign Language Film Category of the 80th Academy Awards.

== Political invocations ==
Since the movie was released, one school shooting has taken place in the country. Two other school shootings have taken place in nearby Finland — the Jokela school shooting and the Kauhajoki school shooting. In analysis of both events, the movie has been raised as an illustration by columnists and other media pundits.
