= Tallinn Ballet School =

Ballet school in Tallinn, Estonia

- Tallinna Balletikool

Location
- Toom-Kooli 11, 10130 Tallinn, Estonia; Tallinn; Estonia
- Coordinates: 59°26′12″N 24°44′18″E

Information
- Enrollment: 100
- Website: balletikool.edu.ee

Tallinn Ballet School (Estonian: Tallinna Balletikool) is ballet school in Tallinn, Estonia. It is the only educational institution for professional ballet dancers in Estonia. The head teacher of school is Kaie Kõrb.

The school was established in 1946.

As of 2020, there are studying about 100 dancers.

Studying period lasts 8 years.
