= Tondi Elektroonika =

Company based in Estonia

Tondi Elektroonika, formerly known as Tallinna Pooljuhttakistite Tehas ('Tallinn Semiconductor Resistor Factory'), Hans Pöögelmanni nimeline Tallinna Raadiotehnika Tehas ('Tallinn Radiotechnical Factory named after Hans Pöögelmann') and Hans Pöögelmanni nimeline Elektrotehnika Tehas ('Hans Pöögelmann Electrotechnical Factory'), as well as Factory A-1381, was a factory for electrotechnical components located in Tallinn, Estonia. It was a significant component of the Soviet military-industrial complex.

When the centralization of the USSR economy resumed in 1966, the national councils were abolished and the factory was subordinated to Moscow and renamed Factory A-1381. As the public name of the numeric factory was not allowed to contain location, the factory was named after September 1, 1966, as the Hans Pöögelmann electrical engineering factory (the electrical engineering factory (abbreviation ETT)). Under this name, the company operated in all its glory to the formation of Tondi electronics in 1991. During this time, the P-N-P-type bipolar transistors and thyristors, the P-channel output transistors and the transistor pair and the outdoor transistor input were produced. In addition, there were some consumer products in production and hearing -proofs about medical electronics.

== Production ==
=== Components ===
The factory has manufactured photoresistors, varistors, transistors, thyristors and microchips.

From 1959 to 1978, the factory manufactured temperature-sensitive photoresistors 04-AN (in Cyrillic: 04-АН) for use in Soviet military rocket guidance systems. This brought the factory under the official military-industrial complex umbrella, and the factory was assigned a number — A-1381 — and the location reference was removed from the factory's name.

=== Consumer products ===
The factory has manufactured consumer-grade battery systems, electric fence systems, car engine diagnostics devices and even souvenir radio sets. Since 1979, an important — and by 2008, the main — line of production has been hearing aids, peaking in 1989 at 176,500 units manufactured.

== Recreational activities ==
The mixed choir Helitron was initially set up to cater to employees of Tondi Elektroonika.

== Current status ==
Currently, AS Tondi Elektroonika manufactures mainly hearing aids.
