= Lauri Pedaja =

Estonian actor and hairdresser (born 1987)

Lauri Pedaja.
- Born: 4 April 1987 (age 39); Halliste, then part of Estonian SSR, Soviet Union
- Occupations: Actor, hairdresser

Lauri Pedaja (born 4 April 1987 in Rakvere) is an Estonian actor and hairdresser. He debuted as an actor in the 2007 film The Class directed by Ilmar Raag, where he had one of the lead roles.

In 2008, Pedaja participated as a celebrity contestant on the third season of Tantsud tähtedega, an Estonian version of Dancing with the Stars. His professional dancing partner was Kristina Tennokese.

== Filmography ==
Films

| Year | Film | Role | Notes |
|---|---|---|---|
| 2007 | The Class | Anders | Estonian Culture Film |
| 2012 | Vasaku jala reede | Drug addict | Tallinn Skyline Productions |
| 2019 | Abeyance | TV Reporter | OÜ FilMinistry |
| 2021 | Öölapsed | Kate's boyfriend | Alexandra Film |

Television

| Year | Title | Role | Notes |
|---|---|---|---|
| 2008 | Tantsud tähtedega (Dancing with the Stars) | himself | Kanal 2 |
| 2009–2010 | Ohver | Roomet | Web series |
| 2010 | Ühikarotid | Kustav "Staff" | Kanal 2 |
| 2010 | Klass: Elu pärast | Anders | Eesti Televisioon |
| 2012 | Romet ja Julia | Artur | Kanal 2 |
| 2014 | Viimane võmm | Arne | Kanal 2 |
| 2014–2018 | Köök | Sergo | Kanal 2 |
| 2019 | Kättemaksukontor | Tõnis Alejandro Mankel | TV3 |
