= Jüri Nael =

Estonian choreographer and actor

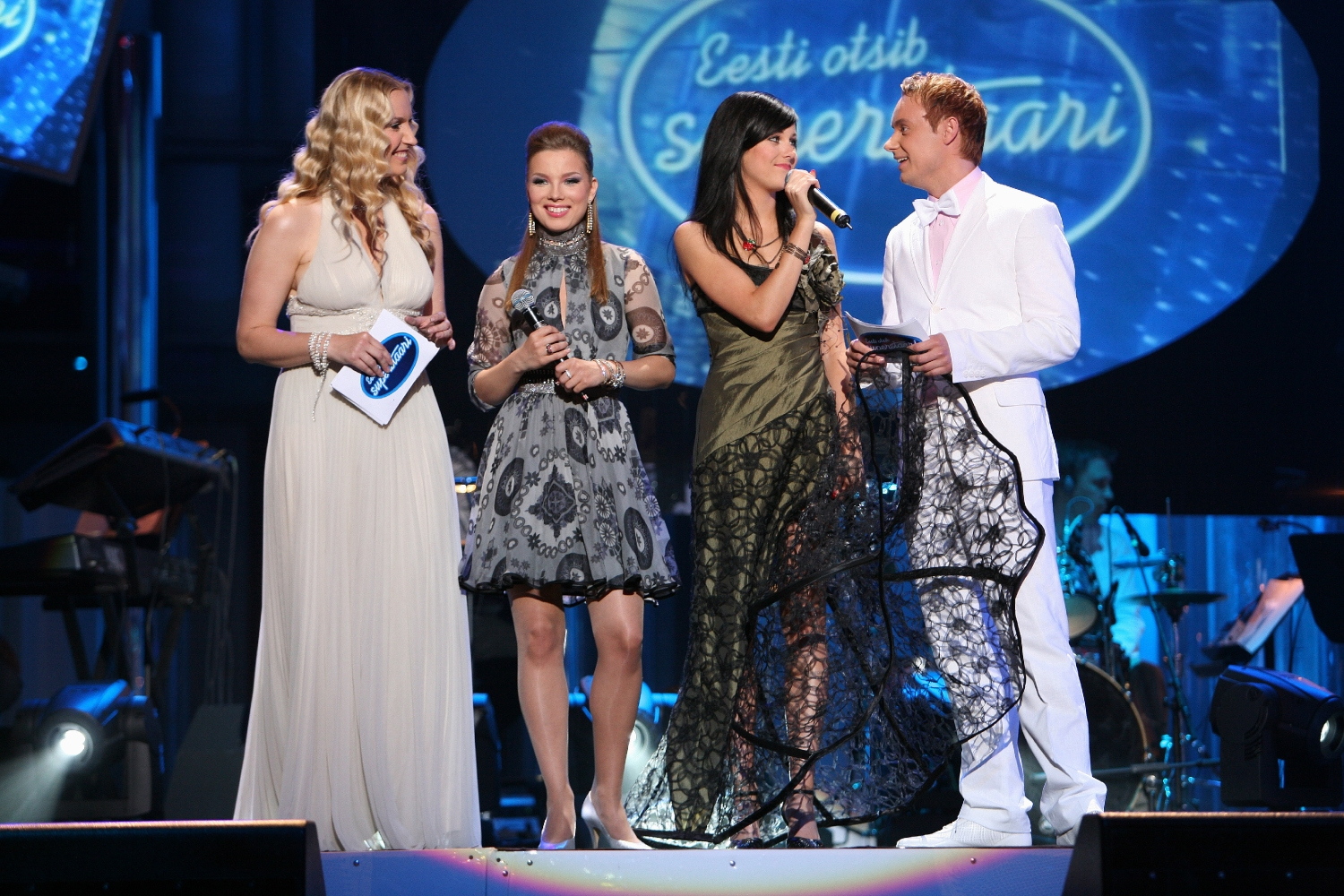
Final of Eesti otsib superstaari, Jüri Nael (right), with (from left) Aigi Vahing, Luisa Värk, and Birgit Õigemeel. 2007

Jüri Nael (born 9 July 1975) is an Estonian choreographer, movement director, professor of contemporary performance and theatre pedagogue.

Nael was born and raised in Viljandi. He graduated from Viljandi Culture Academy in 1998, having majored in choreography.

Between 2001 and 2005, he taught stage movement and dance and was a lecturer at the Estonian Academy of Music and Theatre. From 2006 until 2011, he was a physical theatre associate professor with the academy, and since 2016, leading professor of contemporary performance. In 2019, he created and is currently running an international Master of Art degree in Contemporary Physical Performance Making (CPPM). Between 2006 and 2007, he was a lecturer at Tallinn University's Department of Choreography, and head of department from 2007 until 2008, and associate professor from 2007 until 2011. He has also been a visiting Professor of Choreography at Jacksonville University in Florida, US. Since 2011, he is a lecturer of physical theatre at the Royal Academy of Dramatic Art in London. Since 2019, he is studying at Estonian Music and Theatre Academy (doctoral studies).

From 2006 until 2011, he was one of the judges in the Kanal 2 television dance competition series Tantsud tähtedega. He has also appeared as an actor in the television series Riigimehed and Väikesed hiiglased.

Nael is gay and speaks openly about his sexuality in hopes to foster further acceptance of the LGBT community in Estonia.

== Works ==
- 2006: Margoshes' ja Fernandez' "Fame" (director, musical theatre, in Tallinn Linnahall)
- 2010: "Naela Waiting for ..." (director, with L. Marshall, solo performance)
