= Gerli Padar =

Estonian singer and actress

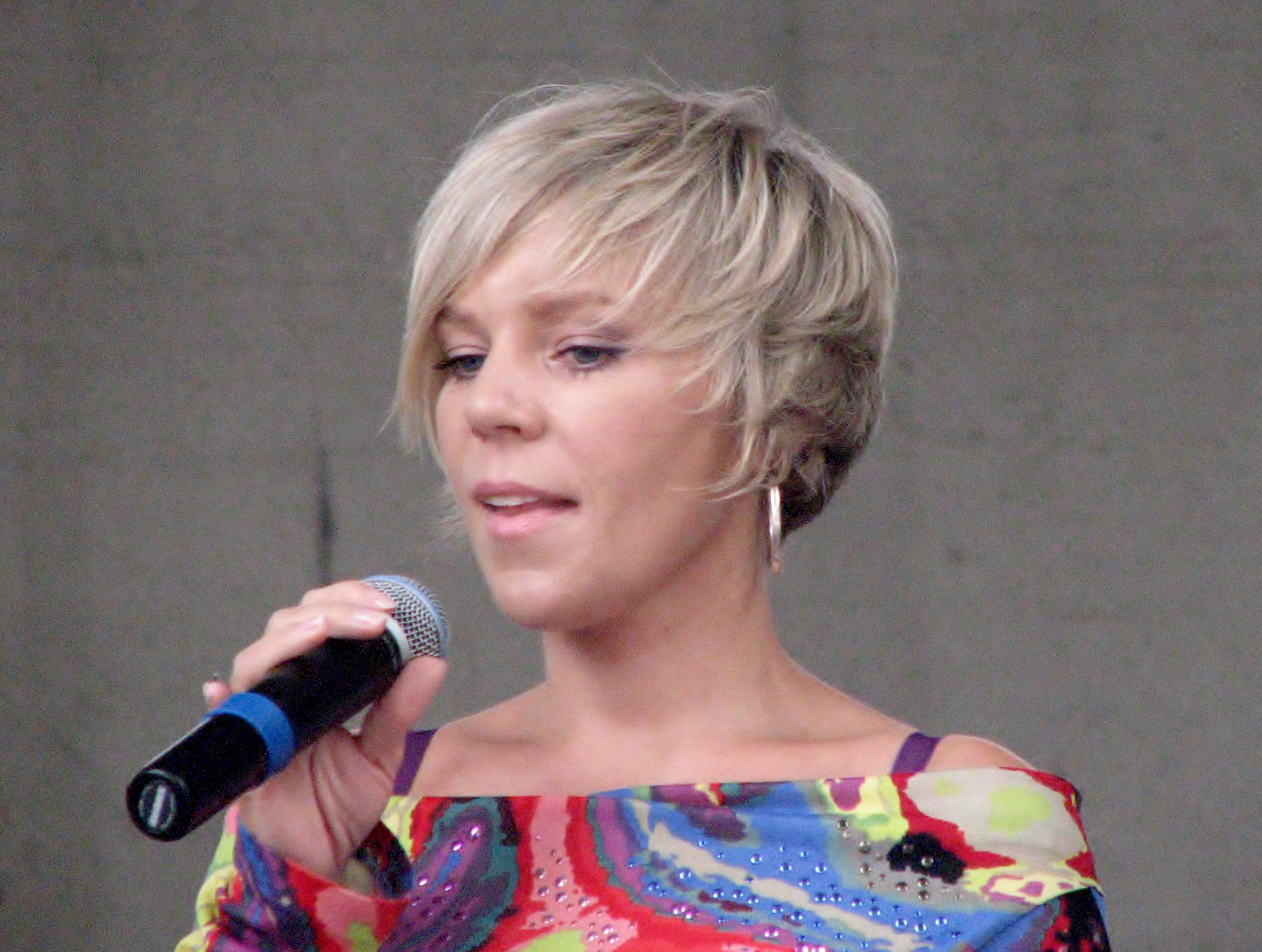
- Gerli Padar in 2013

Background information
- Born: Gerli Padar; 6 November 1979 (age 46); Haljala, then part of Estonian SSR, Soviet Union
- Genres: Pop
- Years active: 1994–present

Gerli Padar (born 6 November 1979) is an Estonian singer and actress. She represented Estonia in the Eurovision Song Contest 2007.

== Career ==
In 1994, at the age of 14, Gerli won the Estonian Television children's singing contest Laulukarussell. In 1997 she won young singers' contest Kaks takti ette. She participated in the Estonian preselection of the Eurovision Song Contest in 1999 (Aeg kord täidab soovid) and 2002 (Need a Little Nothing).

Padar has performed in several hit Estonian stage musicals including her starring roles as Sally in Cabaret, as Florence in Chess, and as Lotte in stage adaptations of the eponymous Estonian children's animated film series.

She released her first solo album in 2007. Padar represented Estonia in the Eurovision Song Contest 2007 with the song "Partners in Crime" which failed to qualify for the final placing 22nd along with Montenegro and receiving 33 points. In the 2010 contest, she was one of the 5 jurors for Estonia.

In 2006 she hosted, alongside Mikk Sarv, the educational TV program "Õpiõu!" ("Learning outdoors").

In 2018, she competed in Eesti Laul 2018 together with Eliis Pärna with the song Taevas (performed in the semifinal in English as "Sky"), which came last in the final.

== Personal life ==
Padar was born and grew up in Haljala, Lääne-Viru County. She is the elder sister of musician Tanel Padar, who won the 2001 Eurovision Song Contest for Estonia.

From 2001 to 2006, she was married to her first husband, who is Finnish. They have one child together, Amanda Rebeca Padar, who is a film and TV actress and professional dancer.

In 2006, Padar participated in the first season of the Estonian Dancing with the Stars adaptation, Tantsud tähtedega, where she was paired with professional dancer Martin Parmas. They finished as runners-up. The two began a relationship during the show, which was made public shortly after the 2007 Eurovision Song Contest, where Parmas had been the lead background dancer for Padar's performance. They married in 2022 and have a daughter together.

Awards and achievements
Preceded by Sandra Oxenryd with "Through My Window"	Estonia in the Eurovision Song Contest; 2007	Succeeded by Kreisiraadio with "Leto svet"
