= Röövel Ööbik =

Estonian musical group

Röövel Ööbik is an Estonian indie-rock group. They recorded a John Peel Session in 1993, in Maida Vale studios with the lineup of Allan Hmelnitski (guitar), Tarvo Hanno Varres (bass, vibes), Tõnu Pedaru (vocals) and Raul Saaremets (drums, guitar).

== Discography ==
=== Studio albums ===
- Ilu (Kuldnokk, 1989. MC)
- Popsubterranea (TWINCD 10, Finland, 1992, CD / Umblu Records, 2007. CD)
- Psychikosmos (KC Rec KC 01, 1996. MC,CD)
- Supersymmetry (Umblu Records, 2005. CD)
- Ringrada (Umblu Records, 2009. CD)
- Transcent (Umblu Records, 2024. LP)
