= Taimo Toomast =

Estonian opera singer (1962–2025)

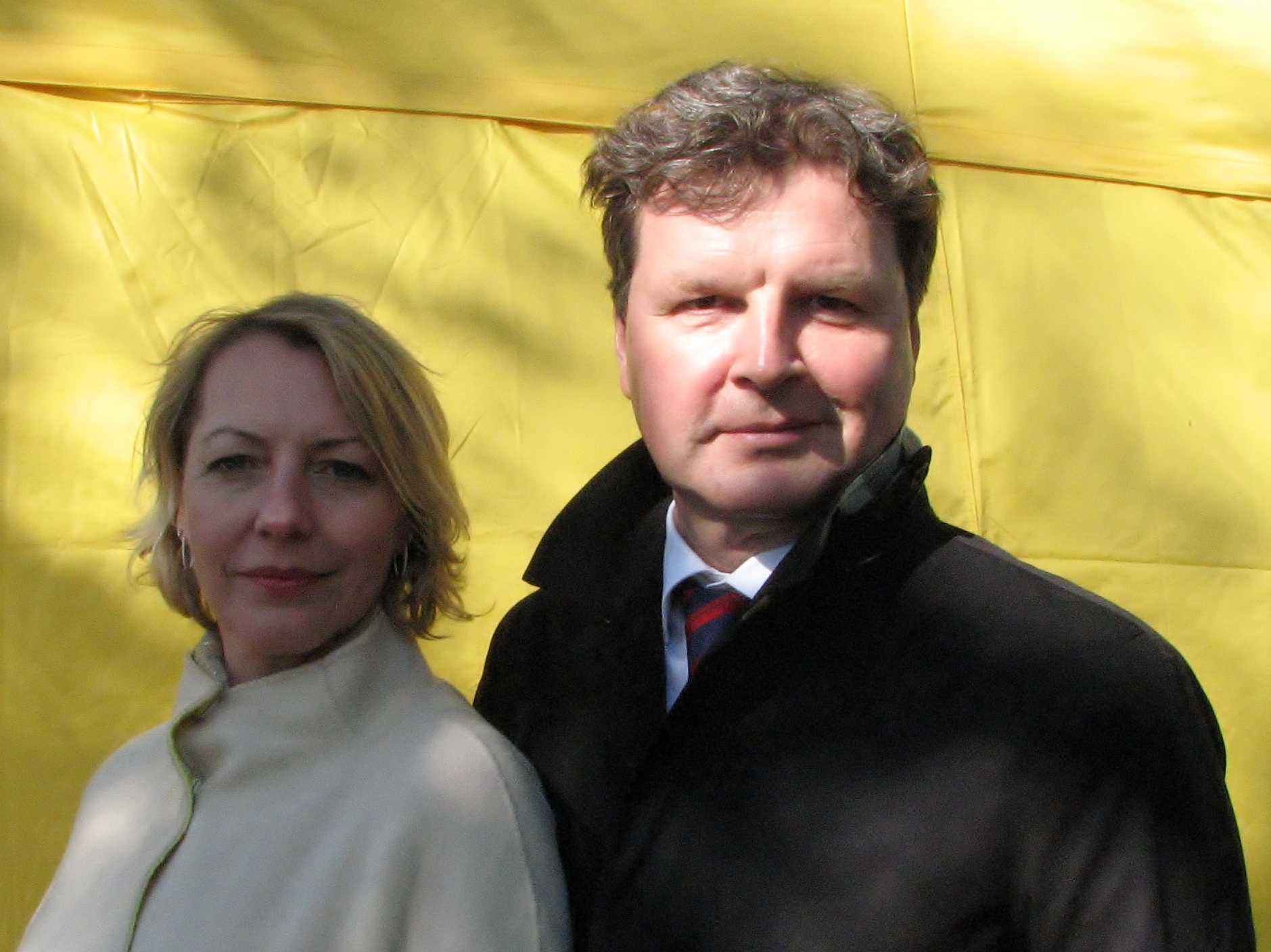
Taimo Toomast with Vilja Toomast

Taimo Toomast (17 May 1962 – 29 August 2025) was an Estonian operatic baritone singer. He performed in many European opera houses and toured in the United States.

== Early life and education ==
Taimo Toomast was born in Pärnu on 17 May 1962. He graduated from the Tallinn Conservatoire in 1989 in the singing class of Teo Maiste. Toomast complemented his studies in the summer courses of Savonlinna (1987) and Kangasniemi (1988), at the Vienna State Opera studio (1990–1991), the Konservatorium der Stadt Wien (class of Margarethe Bence and Lied-class of David Lutz 1990–1992) and later in Germany by Athe Pars and Georg Fortune. He was able to be the lead in productions such as Das Donaugeschenk by Reiner Bischof, and Mozart's Così fan tutte by the Vienna Chamber Opera.

== Career ==
Toomast performed as a baritone soloist at the Vienna State Opera and at the Vienna Chamber Opera, he was a soloist at the Coburg Landestheater and in Dessau Anhaltisches Theater (altogether for 12 years). He also performed as guest soloist in many other German theatres (Gera, Bauzen, Osnabrück, Passau). From 2004 to 2008 he lived and worked in Spain. He worked together with the Alicante Symphony Orchestra and participated in a concert tour in the USA. From 2009, Toomast was a lecturer in the singing department at the Estonian Academy of Music and Theatre, and from 2010 was once again a guest soloist in the Estonian National Opera and in the Vanemuine Theatre.

Toomast's roles included Figaro in The Barber of Seville, Di Posa in Don Carlos, Sharpless in Madama Butterfly, Papageno in The Magic Flute and Valentin in Faust.

== Personal life and death ==
Taimo Toomast had three children (Elisabeth, Sophie-Marie and Tristan-Tobias) and was married to Estonian politician Vilja Toomast. He died on 29 August 2025, at the age of 63.
