= Vilja Toomast =

Estonian politician (born 1962)

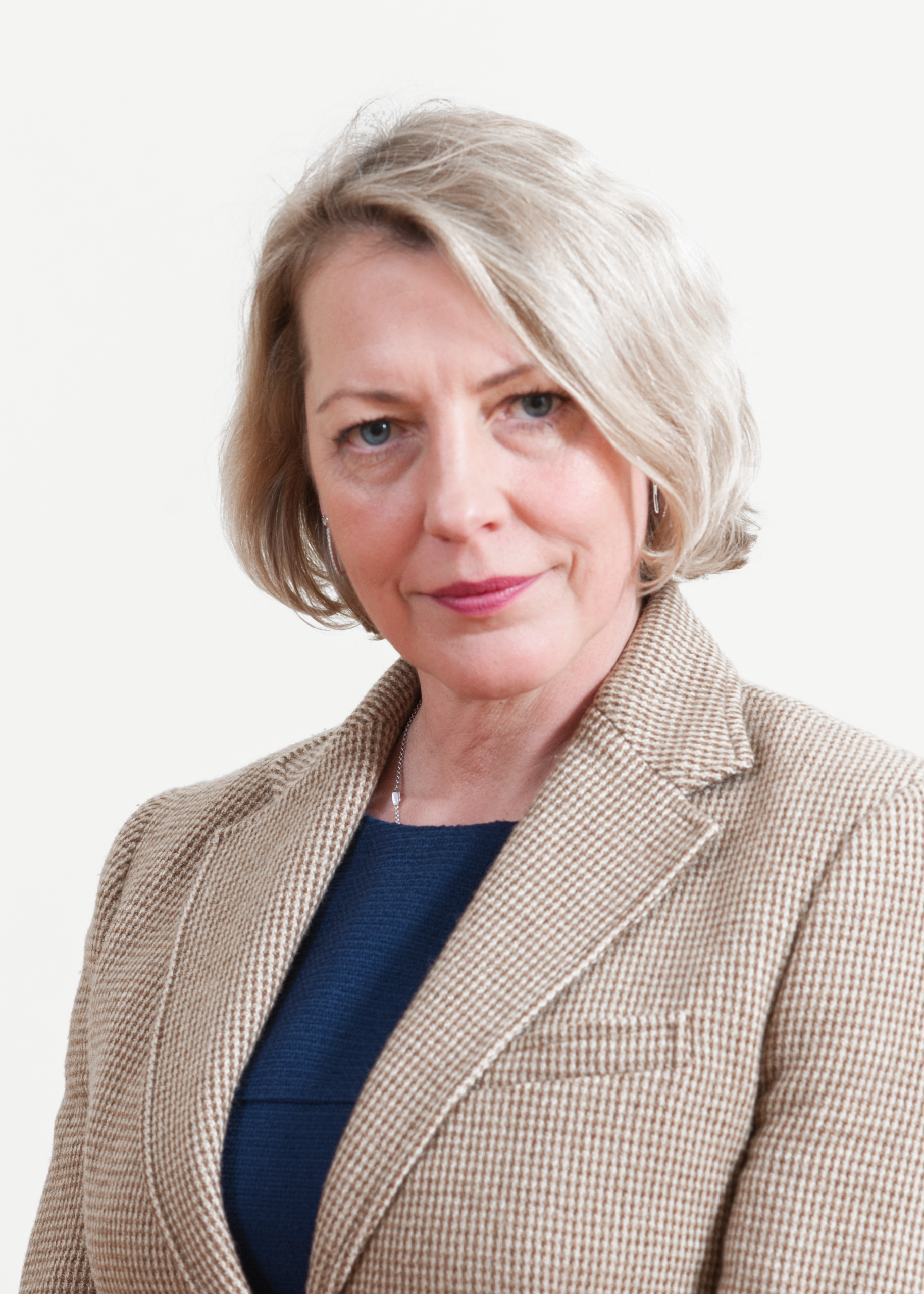

Personal details
- Born: August 15, 1962 (age 64) Antsla, Estonia
- Party: Estonian Reform Party
- Education: University of Tartu
- Occupation: Politician

Vilja Toomast (born 15 August 1962 as Vilja Laanaru; 1996–2010 Vilja Savisaar; 2010–2015 Vilja Savisaar-Toomast) is an Estonian politician, a former Member of the European Parliament. She previously belonged to the Estonian Centre Party which she decided to leave on 9 April 2012.

In 1992–1995, Vilja Laanaru was a member of the Riigikogu, belonging to the Independent Royalist Party of Estonia. In 1997, she joined the Estonian Centre Party and has been elected to the Riigikogu several times, as well as working in the Tallinn city government. In 2009, she became a Member of the European Parliament after Edgar Savisaar renounced his mandate, so as to remain mayor of Tallinn. She left the Centre Party in 2012, maintaining her position as an MEP, and joined the Estonian Reform Party in June 2013. She ran again at the 2014 European elections, but was not successful.

In June 2018, Toomast returned to the Riigikogu to replace MP Eerik-Niiles Kross, who had vacated his seat.

She has been President of the Estonian Volleyball Federation since 2007 and since November 2008, in the Executive Committee of the Estonian Olympic Committee for the next 4 years.

== MEP ==
- Member of the Transport and Tourism Committee
- Member of the EU-Kazakhstan, EU-Kyrgyzstan and EU-Uzbekistan Parliamentary Cooperation Committees, and for relations with Tajikistan, Turkmenistan and Mongolia delegation
- Substitute in Regional Development Committee

== Personal life ==
In her youth she dated Vahur Kersna, an Estonian TV personality also originating from Antsla.

In 1996, Vilja Laanaru married Centre Party leader Edgar Savisaar; they divorced in 2009. They have one daughter. In August 2010, she married opera singer Taimo Toomast (since 2013 member of the Reform Party) and changed her surname to Savisaar-Toomast. In December 2015 she announced the omission of Savisaar from her surname.

== Education ==
In 1985 Toomast graduated with a degree from the University of Tartu, as a psychologist and teacher. In 1988 she obtained a Master's degree at the Institute of General and Molecular Pathology of the State University of Tartu.

== Career ==
- Psychologist, Mainor consultants (1988–1990)
- Assistant to the Prime Minister (1990–1992)
- Chief editor, Seitse Päeva magazine (1990–1994)
- Adviser to the Deputy Speaker of the Estonian Parliament (1992–1994)
- Chief editor, Elu Pilt magazine (1994–1997)
- Adviser to the Minister for Home Affairs (1995)
- Mayor of the Nõmme section of Tallinn (1999)
- Editor responsible for OÜ Pilt ja Sõna (1999–2002)
- Deputy mayor, Northern Tallinn Executive (2002), mayor of city section (2005–2007)
- Member of the Estonian Parliament (2003–2005 and since 2007).
- Member of the executive, Keskerakond Party.
- Member, Eestimaa Rahvarinde volikogu (1990), Tallinn City Council (1999–2002)
- Member of the Estonian Parliament during the 10th and 11th parliamentary terms.
- Chair, board of East Tallinn Central Hospital; chair, board of In Commune Bonum
- President, Estonian Volleyball Association;
- member, Executive Committee of the Estonian Olympic Committee
- President, Eastern European Zonal Association of the European Volleyball Federation

== Other ==
In 2006, Toomast participated as a celebrity contestant on the first season of Tantsud tähtedega, an Estonian version of Dancing with the Stars. Her professional dancing partner was Veiko Ratas.

== Published works ==
- Memoirs 'Valguses ja varjus' (Kohtla-Järve 1995)
- Collection 'Eestimaa Rahvarinne' (Tallinn 2002).

Political offices
| Preceded by Värner Lootsmann | Elder of Nõmme District, Tallinn; 1999 | Succeeded by Urmas Paet |
| Preceded by Sirje Potisepp | Elder of Põhja-Tallinn District, Tallinn; 2005–2007 | Succeeded by Enno Tamm |
