= Luisa Rõivas =

Estonian singer and politician

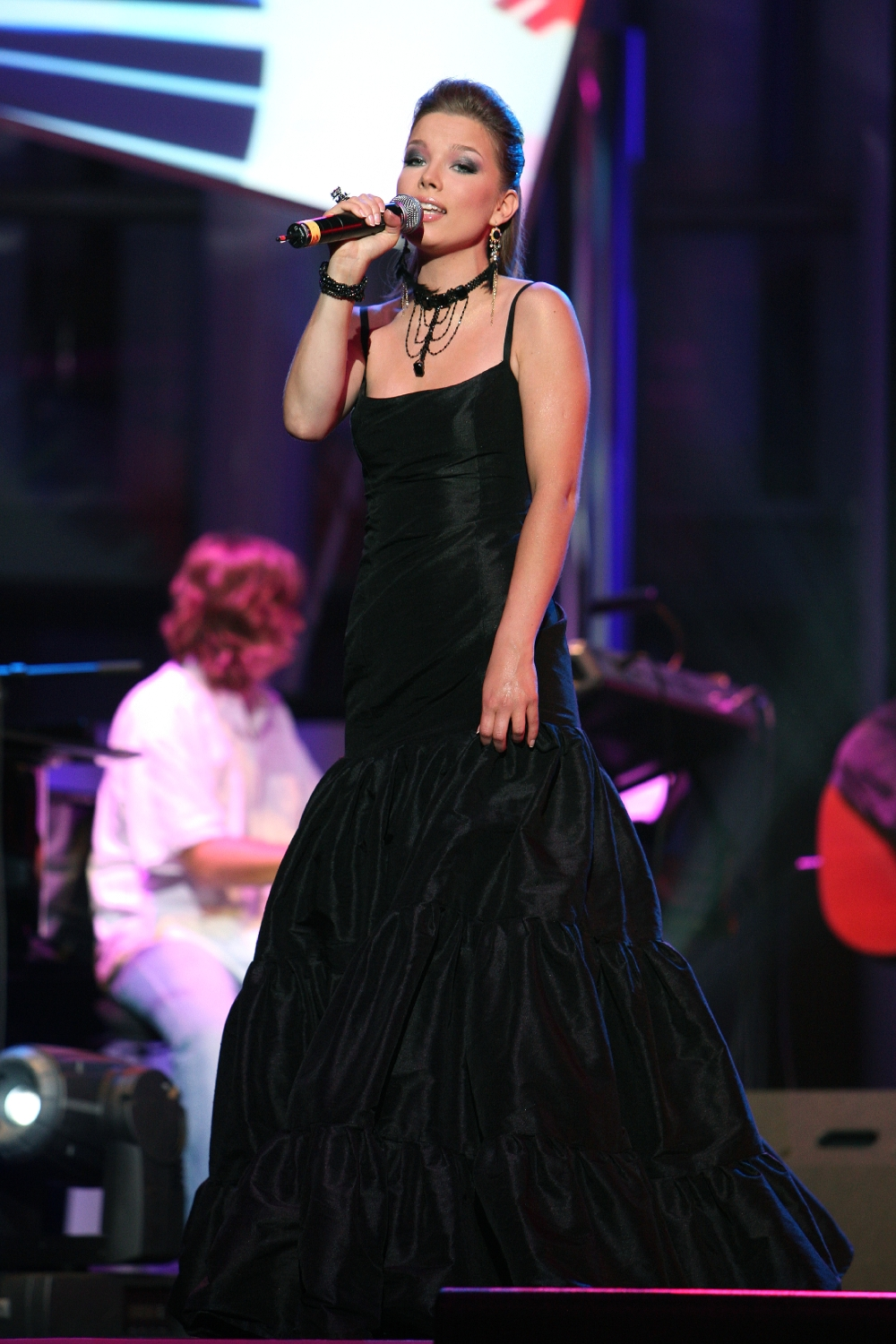
- Värk in 2007

Member of the Riigikogu
- Incumbent
- Assumed office 10 April 2023
- Constituency: Jõgeva–Tartu

Personal details
- Born: Luisa Värk; 6 February 1987 (age 39) Elva, then part of Estonian SSR, Soviet Union
- Party: Reform
- Spouse: Taavi Rõivas (m. 2017)
- Children: 3
- Education: Tallinn University
- Occupation: Singer; politician
- Musical career
- Genres: Pop; country
- Years active: 2007–present

Luisa Rõivas (née Värk; born 6 February 1987) is an Estonian singer and politician.

Rõivas was a runner-up of on the first season of Estonian Pop Idol (Eesti otsib superstaari). She was also a runner-up on Tantsud tähtedega, Estonia's version of Dancing with the Stars. Her dancing partner was Martin Parmas.

Rõivas participated in the Estonian Eurovision national final Eurolaul 2008 with two songs:"It's Never Too Late" with Estonian band Traffic and "God Inside your Soul" with Margus Vaher. She participated again in the 2015 edition of the Eesti Laul, where she reached the final stage but ended up in last place. In 2016 she was chosen as a jury for the second semifinal of the Eesti Laul

Rõivas is married to Taavi Rõivas, former Prime Minister of Estonia. She began a political career of her own in 2023, after she was elected to the Riigikogu in the parliamentary election for the Reform Party in electoral district no. 9.
