= Kaie Kõrb =

Estonian ballet dancer and dance teacher (born 1961)

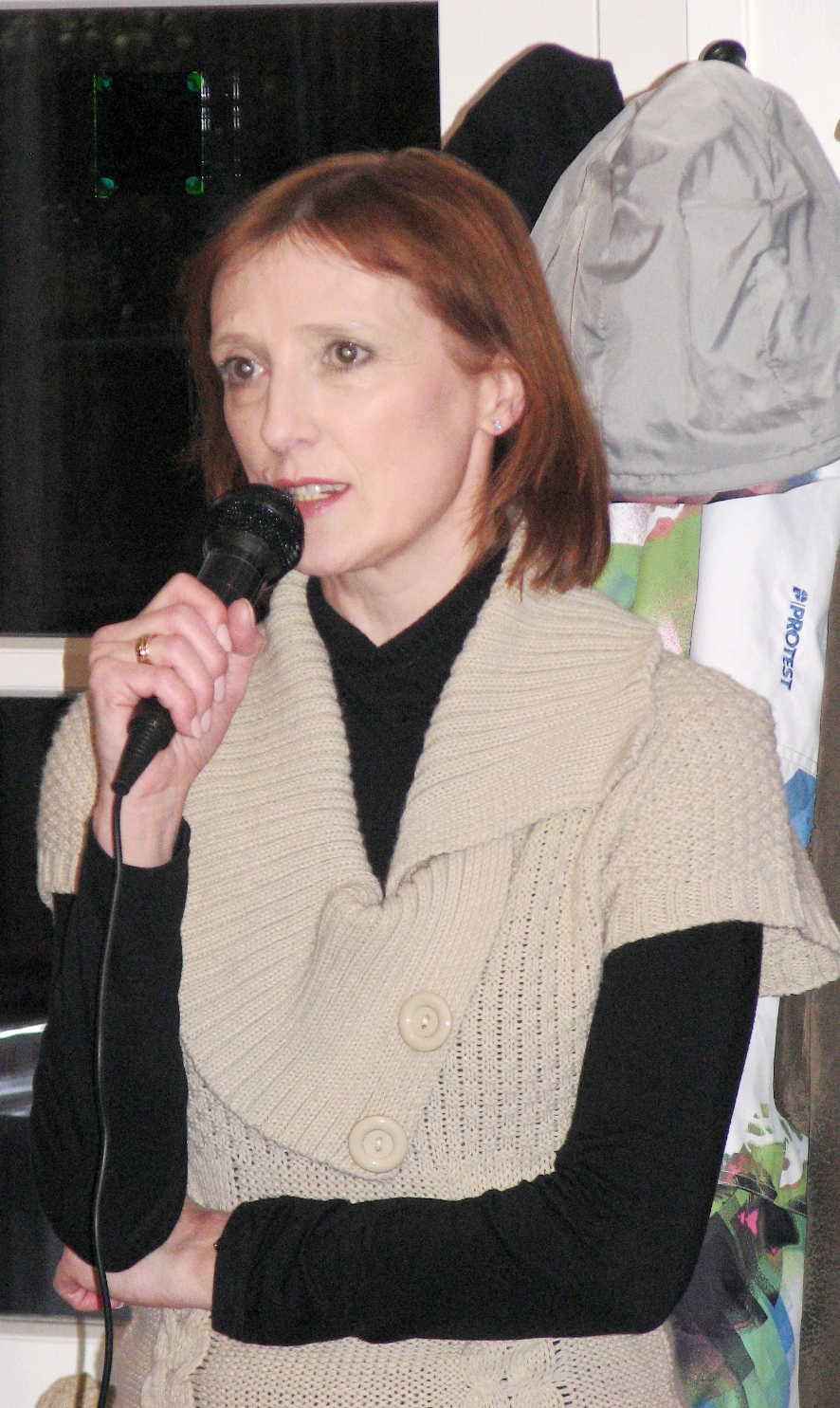
Kõrb in 2011

Kaie Kõrb (born 1 April 1961, in Pärnu) is an Estonian ballet dancer and dance teacher. In 2006, she was described as "perhaps the country's most famous dancer today".

She graduated from the Tallinn Ballet School (Tallinna Balletikool) in 1980, and was prima ballerina of the Estonian National Opera. She is now director of the Tallinn Ballet School.
