= Ants Tael =

Estonian dancer and dance pedagogue (1936–2025)

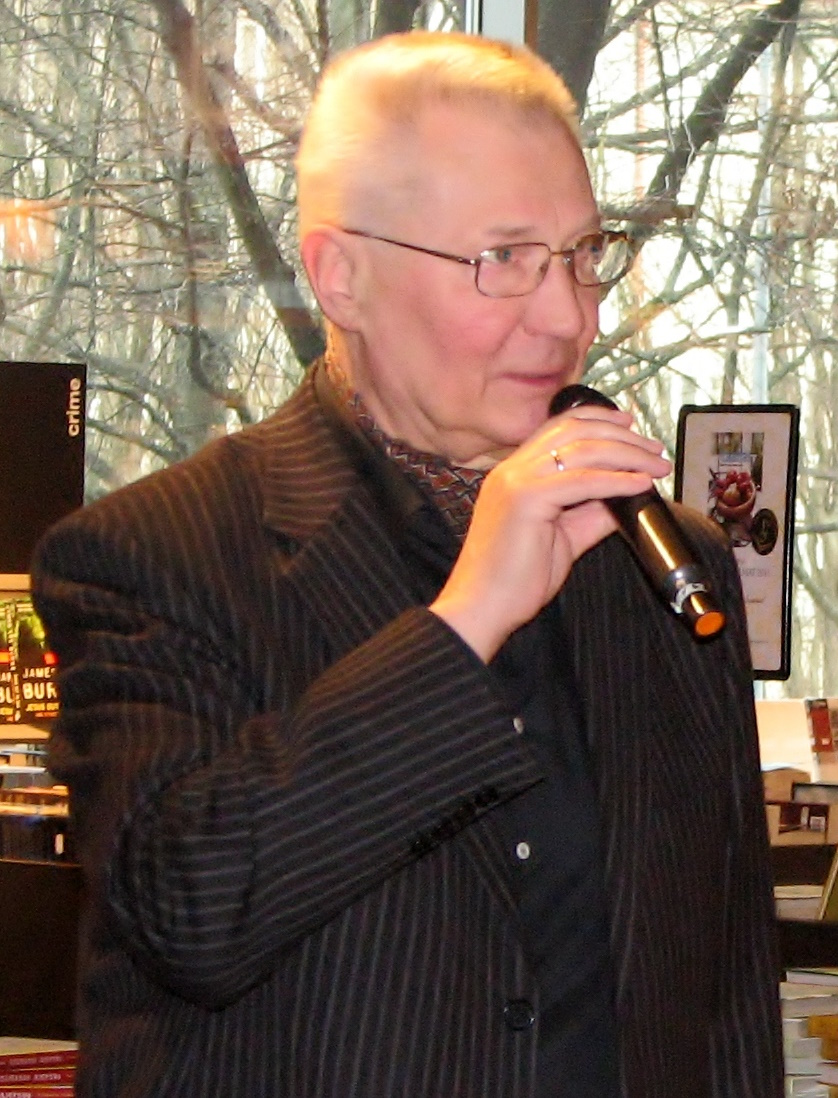
Tael in 2012

Ants Tael (19 July 1936 – 23 July 2025) was an Estonian dancer and dance pedagogue.

== Life and career ==
Tael was born in Tallinn on 19 July 1936. He was a member of the jury in television series Tantsud tähtedega.

In 2010, he was awarded the Order of the White Star, IV class.

Tael died on 23 July 2025, at the age of 89.
