= Tantsud tähtedega =

Estonian television series

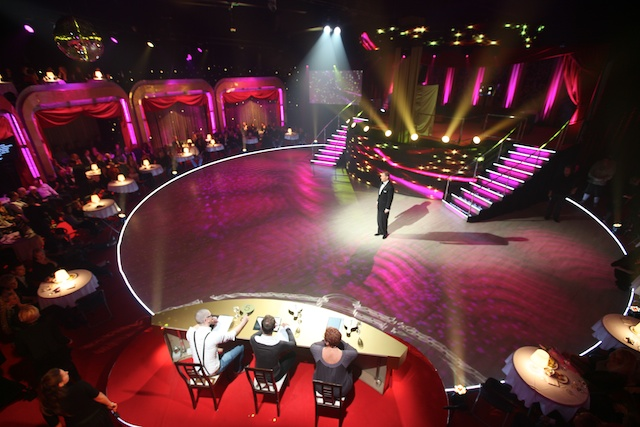
- Studio (2011)
- Created by: Fenia Vardanis
- Presented by: Mart Sander (2006–11); Kristiina Heinmets-Aigro (2006); Merle Liivak (2007); Gerli Padar (2008); Kaisa Oja (2010); Jüri Pootsmann (2022-present); Eda-Ines Etti (2022-present)
- Judges: Ants Tael (2006–11); Merle Klandorf (2006–11); Jüri Nael (2006–07; 2010–11; 2022-present); Kaie Kõrb (2006–07); Riina Suhotskaja (2008); Märt Agu (2008); Martin Parmas (2022-present); Tanja Mihhailova-Saar (2022-present); Helen Klandorf-Sadam (2022-present)
- Country of origin: Estonia
- No. of series: 6

Production
- Producer: Raivo Suviste
- Camera setup: Multi-camera
- Running time: Various lengths
- Production company: BEC

Original release
- Network: Kanal 2 TV3
- Release: 8 October 2006

Tantsud tähtedega (Estonian: Dancing with the Stars) is an Estonian television reality show that aired on Kanal 2 and season six on TV3. It debuted on 8 October 2006, and it became a popular television show in Estonia. It is based on the British reality TV competition Strictly Come Dancing and is part of the Dancing with the Stars franchise. The series was produced by BEC productions and ended in 2011.

The show introduces eight Estonian celebrities paired with professional ballroom dancers who each week compete to impress a panel of judges and the viewing public to survive potential elimination. Through a telephone poll, viewers vote for those couples who should stay. 50% of the public votes and the average score given by the panel of judges go towards deciding who should leave. Proceeds from the voting go to charity.

Six seasons have been produced, in 2006, 2007, 2008, 2010, 2011 and 2022.

== Judges ==
- Merle Klandorf (2006–2011) - former professional ballroom dancer, ballroom dance teacher
- Ants Tael (2006–2010) - ballroom dance teacher
- Jüri Nael (2006–07; 2010–11, 2022) - choreographer and dance pedagogue
- Kaie Kõrb (2006–2008) - former ballerina and dance pedagogue
- Riina Suhhotskaja (2008) - aerobics coach
- Märt Agu (2008) - choreographer and dance pedagogue

== Seasons ==
=== Season one ===
Season one premiered in October 2006. The hosts were Mart Sander and Kristiina Heinmets-Aigro. The show was won by singer Mikk Saar and his partner Olga Kosmina. The runners-up were singer Gerli Padar and her partner Martin Parmas.

=== Season two ===
Season two premiered in October 2007. The hosts were Mart Sander and Merle Liivak. The show was won by singer Koit Toome and his partner Kerttu Tänav. The runners-up were singer Luisa Värk and her partner Martin Parmas.

=== Season three ===
Season three premiered in October 2008. The hosts were Mart Sander and a runner-up of the first season Gerli Padar. The show was won by professional bodybuilder Argo Ader and his partner Helena Liiv. The runners-up were singer Maarja-Liis Ilus and her partner Veiko Ratas.

=== Season four ===
Season four premiered in October 2010. The hosts are Mart Sander and Kaisa Oja. The winners were Liina Vahter and Mairold Millert. The runners-up were singer Ithaka Maria Rahula and Marko Kiigajaan.

=== Season five ===
Season five premiered in October 2011. The hosts are Mart Sander and Liina Randpere. The winners were actor Jan Uuspõld and his partner Aleksandra Žeregelja. The runners-up were World Figure Skating silver medallist Anna Levandi and her partner Mairold Millert.

=== Season six ===
Season six premiered in the fall of 2022. Unlike the other seasons, it was broadcast on TV3 channel. The presenters were Eda-Ines Etti and Jüri Pootsmann. The judges included Tanja Mihhailova-Saar, Martin Parmas and Jüri Nael. The winner was actress Ülle Lichtfeldt and his partner Marko Mehine. The runners-up were politician Jüri Ratas and his partner Kristina Tarmet.

Other contestants were Birgit Sarrap, Kadri Tali, Ruslan Trochynskyi and Juss Haasma.
