= Mart Sander =

Estonian filmmaker (born 1967)

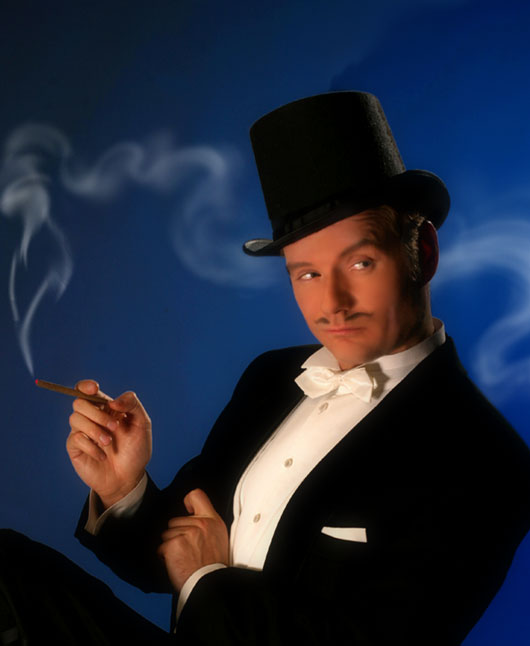
- Sander in 2008
- Born: 10 August 1967 (age 59); Tallinn, then part of Estonian SSR, Soviet Union
- Occupations: Singer, actor, director, author
- Years active: 1985–present
- Website: www.filministry.com

Mart Sander (born 10 August 1967) is an Estonian filmmaker, actor, author and musician. He holds a PhD in film studies, and the Guinness World Record for "Most Roles Played by a Single Actor in a Film" for his 2024 film Dr. Sander's Sleep Cure.

== Life and career ==
In his youth, Mart Sander studied violin and conducting. He started singing in the choir of the Estonian National Opera at the age of eighteen. At the age of nineteen, Sander and swing orchestra Modern Fox won a talent competition in Moscow, the band toured both in Soviet Union and in Europe. He later returned to the Estonian National Opera as a stage director. He obtained his BA in musicology from the Tallinn University, his MA in film and TV directing at the BFM (Baltic Film and Media School) and in 2024, PhD in film also at the BFM, where he is lecturing on cultural history and film music semiotics. He has also studied screenwriting at the London Film Academy. Member of Estonian Writers' Union and Estonian Association of Audiovisual Authors.

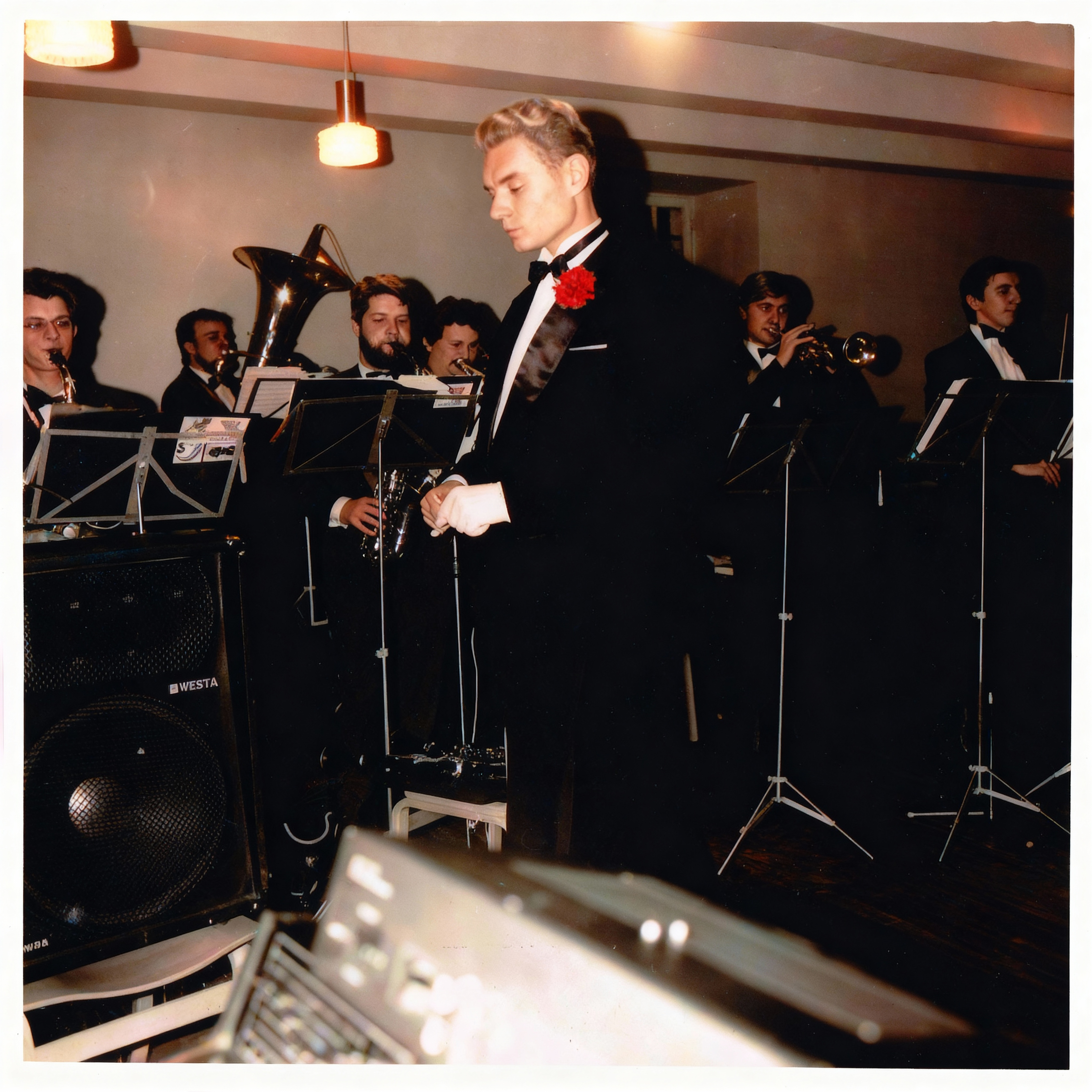
Mart Sander performing with Modern Fox, 1986.

=== Stage ===
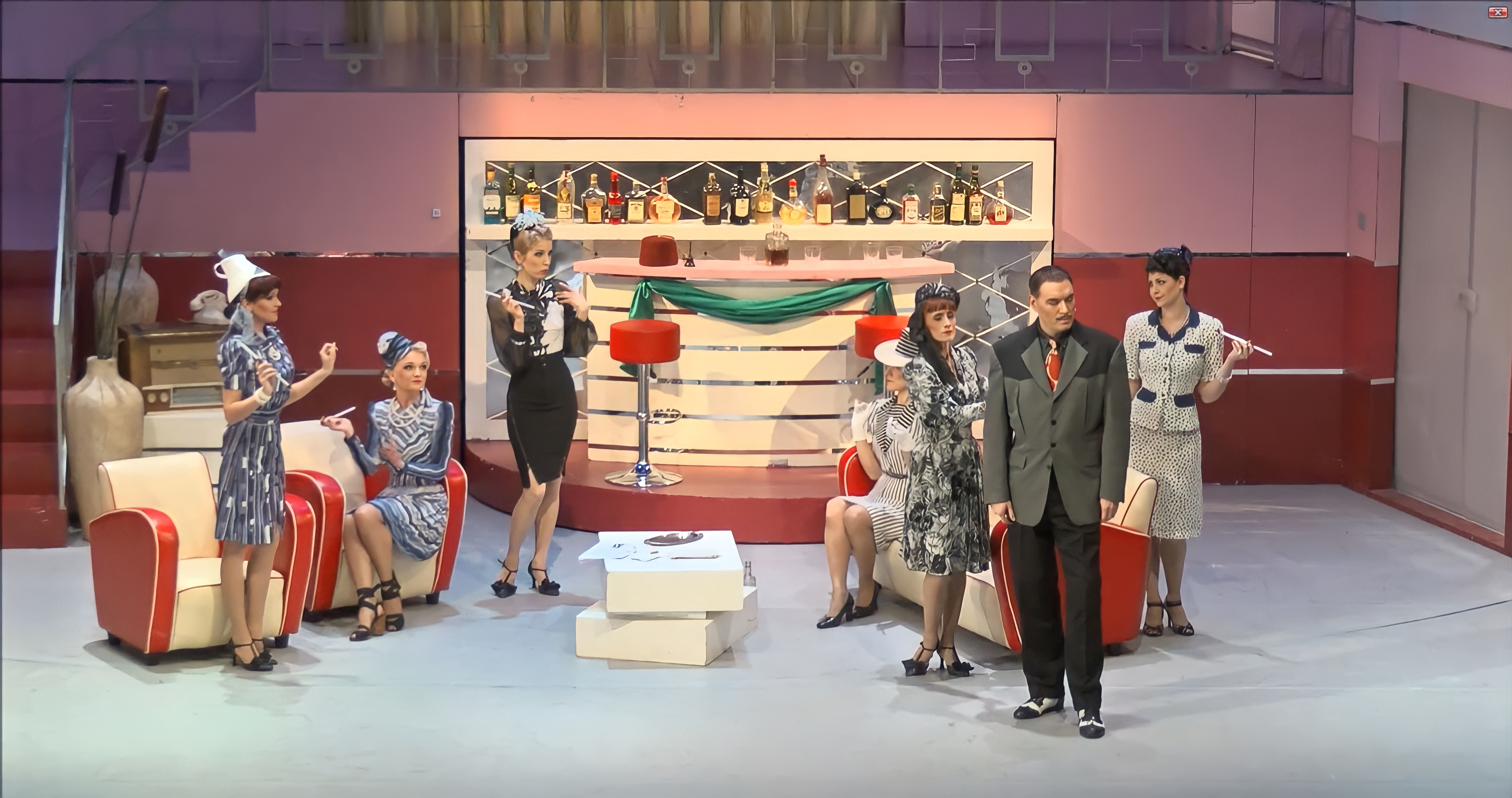
Mart Sander (center right) in the Estonian National Opera production of Ball at the Savoy

The notable roles for Sander include: directing the operetta Silva (Die Czardasfürstin) at the Estonian National Opera in 2010. At the opening night, as the leading singer suffered an injury on the stage, Sander took over the part. In 2014, his production of Ball im Savoy opened at the Estonian National Opera; Sander directed, revised the text, made new orchestral arrangements and provided set and costume design, as well as created the role of Mustafa.

Sander has written stage plays, where he often stars himself, such as Behind the Random Denominator (in Estonian, Juhuslik nimetaja), which was presented to the New York audience in 2015 and The Bughouse (in Estonian, Äratõmbetuli), which premiered in Washington, D.C. in 2018. On 17 June 2018, The Bughouse premiered at the Estonian State Drama Theatre.

On 19 October 2023, his drama play We Should Talk About Raimond, opened in Tallinn (Theatre Nuutrum) and was applauded for its original concept - it runs backwards and the protagonist, Raimond (the composer Raimond Valgre), actually never appears on the stage. It was also reported, that Sander plans to make a screen adaptation of the play in 2024.

In June, 2025, his drama play The Rose Key opened in Mehntack Manor and received positive reviews. The play was also filmed, with Sander himself creating one of the lead roles. In 2026, his crime thriller Victim Searches Murderer was a popular success.

=== Film and television ===
To date, Sander’s filmography includes 30 acting roles and 25 directorial credits, as recorded by IMDb. In most of his own films, he also serves as screenwriter, composer, and editor, thereby maintaining creative control. As an actor, he made his feature film debut as Martti in the 1991 Juha Tapaninen-directed Finnish musical-comedy Iskelmäprinssi. In 1998, he had a role in the Rao Heidmets-directed comedy-family film Kallis härra Q (English release title: Dear Mister Moon), based on the 1992 children's book of the same name by Estonian author Aino Pervik. He had roles in the Hungarian film Why Wasn't He There? and in the US made-for-cable production Candles in the Dark, opposite Alyssa Milano and directed by Maximilian Schell.

Sander's Estonian TV appearances include hosting the Eurolaul 1993 and the TV series Tantsud tähtedega (Dancing with the Stars). He also hosted Tähed muusikas (Stars in the Music) from 1997 to 2006 and again from 2008 to 2010, as well as the hit show Su nägu kõlab tuttavalt (Sing Your Face Off). In 2012, he was a judge on the fifth season of the TV3 reality series competition Eesti otsib superstaari (Estonia is Searching for a Superstar). In 2020, he became the host of the Estonian version of the global TV phenomenon Maskis Laulja (The Masked Singer).

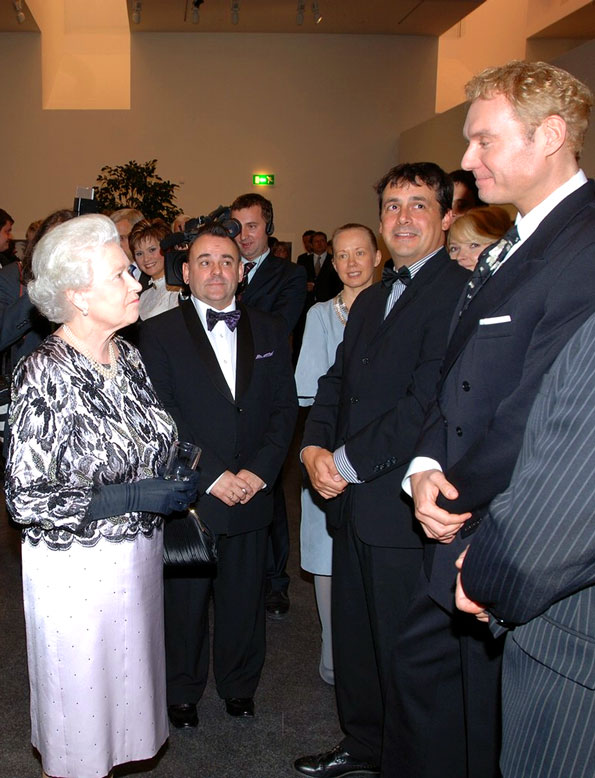
Sander meeting Queen Elizabeth II in 2006

In 2015, Sander took his own one man horror drama Behind the Random Denominator (which he wrote, directed and starred in) to the solo theatre festival United Solo in New York, earning him the Best Sound Design award. The film version of the play became Sander's directorial debut feature. The film premiered at the Haapsalu horror and fantasy film festival HÕFF. It later won Sander his first Best Director award at the 9th Nice International Film Festival and Best Lead Actor award at the Madrid International Film Festival, where he won against such stars as Laurence Fishburne, Robert Davi and Bruno Ganz. In 2018, his short Actually premiered at the HÕFF. This film won several awards at various festivals Also in 2018, he wrote and directed an ambitious 10-part historical TV series The Whores, which is considered the most internationally successful Estonian TV production, as well as a TV movie The Bughouse (in Estonian, Äratõmbetuli), based on his own stage play. On 13 December 2019, his horror-fantasy anthology Eerie Fairy Tales, based on the short story collection of the same name by Sander himself, opened nationwide in Estonia and in limited cinemas in the Baltic states and Finland, gathering positive reviews. The film has won numerous prizes at festivals Both Behind the Random Denominator and Eerie Fairy Tales were released internationally on 28 September 2021, by BayView Entertainment.

In 2020, Sander wrote and directed a feature film titled The Kennedy Incident, based on his own novel. The film is an account of the romantic and politically charged adventures of the future president John F Kennedy during his trip to Tallinn, Estonia, in the summer of 1939. This film premiered on 17 February 2021, at the Santa Fe Film Festival, as the opening film, and won the Best Picture award. In March, it won Best Feature Thriller and Best Actress (Lisette Pomerants) awards at the Europa Film Festival, Barcelona, and in September the Best Feature Film award at the Anatolia International Film Festival. In October, the film won Best Feature Film and Best Director Feature Film awards at the Sweden Film Awards and was nominated Best Film at the Venice TV Awards, where it finished second. The international release of The Kennedy Incident was delayed due to the pandemic and was released by Indican Pictures in August 2023.

Sander premiered his mystery-thriller The Sixth Secret, based on his own original screenplay, at the Dark Nights Film Festival (the only A-list film festival in Estonia) on 1 May and won the Audience Award. The film gathered positive reviews. In July, the movie leaked to all major pirating sites and went viral, reaching No. 2 on YTS.mx on 6 July. It subsequently skyrocketed on the IMDb, where it became No. 1 Estonian film by popularity, with Mart Sander himself ranking as No. 2 on the list of most popular Estonian film personalities. The film was released internationally on 10 January 2023, by Gravitas Ventures.

On 2 January 2023, his short film, Universe 4, premiered at the Norway Fjords International Film Festival and was awarded Best Narrative Short. In April, an anthology short film Three Knocks premiered at the Dark Nights Film Festival. He is currently working on translating his best seller Ravengold to screen, as well as shooting a World War II epic drama Etude of Life. In June 2024, it was announced that he is preparing a historical film Whispers In the Paint, in collaboration with the Film Commission Torino Piedmont.

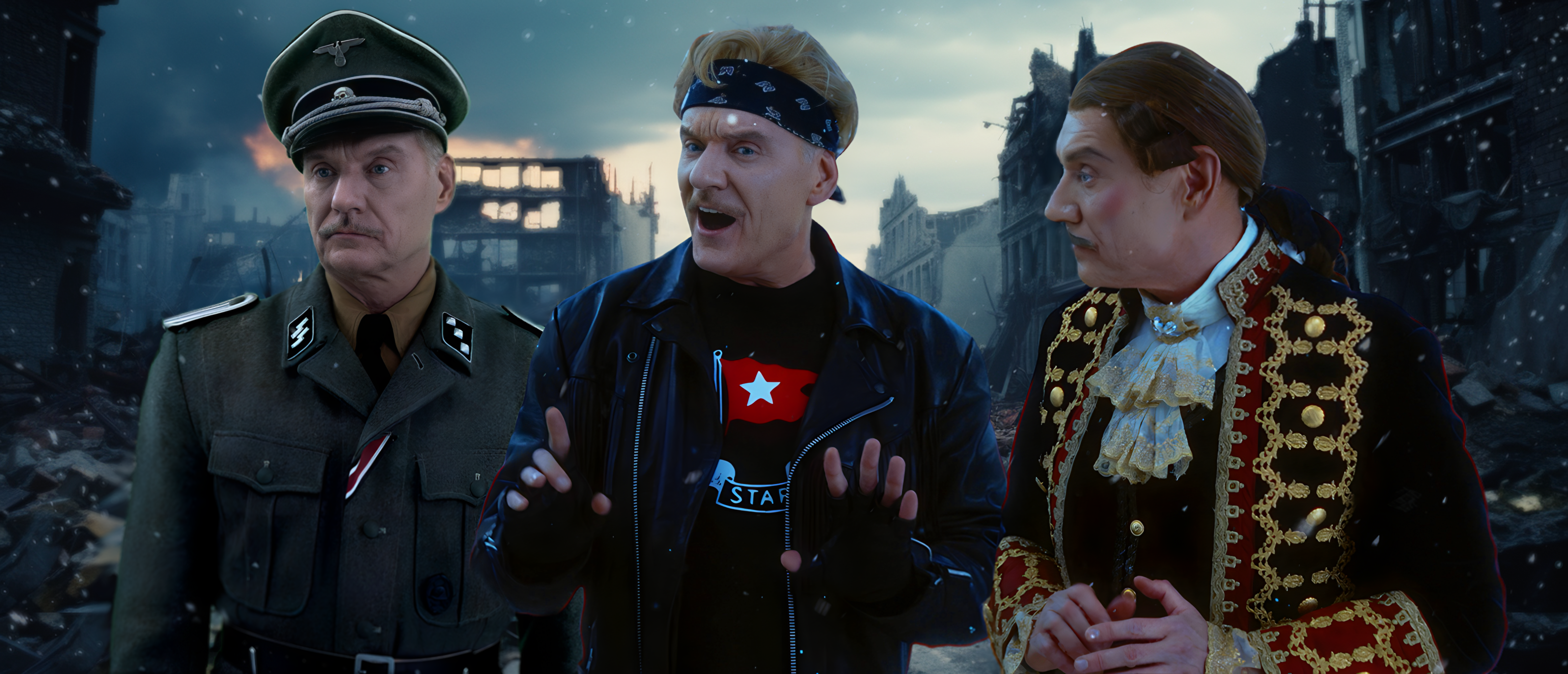
Mart Sander in Dr. Sander’s Sleep Cure (2024), for which he set a Guinness World Record for playing multiple roles.

Sander's 2024 fantasy feature, Dr. Sander's Sleep Cure, shatters the current Guinness World Record for the Most Roles Played By a Single Actor In a Film, as Sander himself portrays 48 distinct characters. The film premiered at the 25th Nevermore Film Festival on 24 February 2024 and won the audience award. It went on to win Best Film awards at the International New York Film Festival and Avignon International Film Festival. The film was released through OctaneMultimedia in February, 2025, and received positive reviews.

In March 2026, his film Tallinn in Flames premiered at the Tbilisi International Documentary Film Festival, where it received the Audience Award. The film later premiered in Tallinn on the anniversary of the Soviet bombing of 1944, which destroyed large parts of the city. It incorporates archival materials enhanced with contemporary CGI technology. The film has since received positive reception. It won special Jury Award at the Haapsalu Horror and Fantasy Film Festival.

At the same festival, on 1 May 2026, Sander premiered his new feature The Rose Key, based on his own stage play, and an experimental short Circus Macabre.

In August 2026, Sander appeared on NewsNation's Reality Check in a television special devoted to Object M, his investigative book about the Merivälja mystery. The book was published in English and Estonian in August 2026. The Reality Check episode subsequently attracted a substantial audience on YouTube. Sander later announced plans to develop the material into a docudrama.

=== Conducting and recording ===
In 2000, Sander established, and began to conduct, the Tallinn-based Bel-Etage Concert Orchestra. In 2004, Sander and Bel-Etage released their first album in Great Britain entitled The Monckton Album, with selections from three musicals composed by Lionel Monckton, on the Divine Art Records label. This album won the 'Critics' Choice' Award from Gramophone. It was followed by The Finck Album, dedicated to the music by Herman Finck.

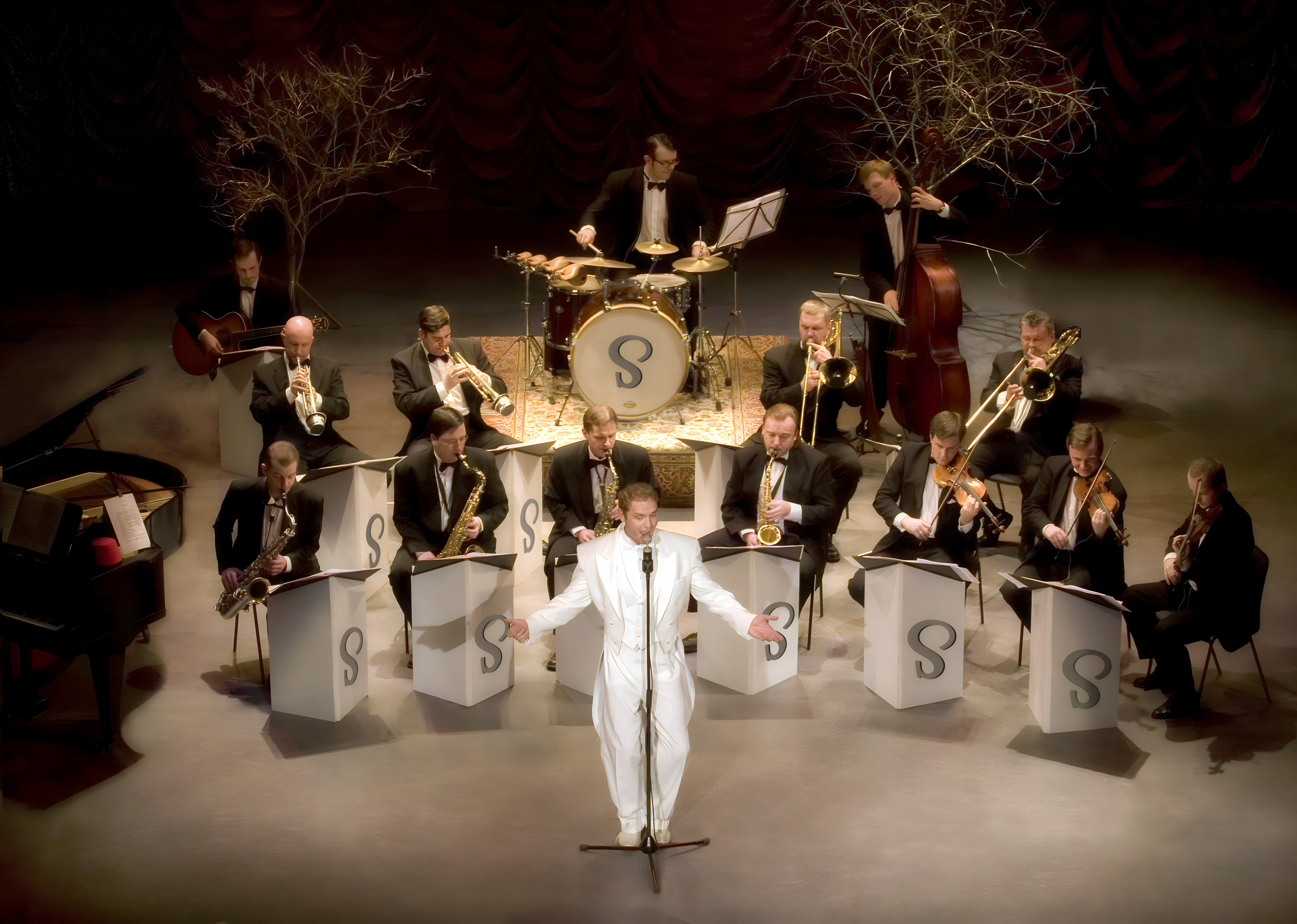
Mart Sander and his orchestra, Swing Swindlers

In 2005, Sander established the Swing Swindlers dance orchestra; in 2005, the Swing Swindlers issued an album in the UK called Five-Fifteen: A Tribute to the BBC Dance Orchestra.

In February 2018, The Swing Swindlers visited the US, as part of the celebrations of Estonia's centennial. The mayor of Washington, D.C. declared 24 February official 'Estonia Day', mentioning a concert by Mart Sander in her proclamation. On 26 February 2018, The Swing Swindlers gave a concert at the Kennedy Center, Washington DC.

After the passing of HRH Queen Elizabeth, Sander was interviewed by Estonian newspapers because he had met the monarch on several occasions and had been commended by Her Majesty for his efforts in promoting British music, particularly the works of Gilbert and Sullivan, in Estonia. Sander recalled that when he sent his recording of Leslie Stuart's Soldiers of the Queen to Her Majesty, he received a letter of thanks from Buckingham Palace. When they met at a reception during Her Majesty's visit to Estonia, she was well-informed about Sander's musical career and spent nearly two minutes speaking with him.

In March 2026, Sander won first prize at the Concurso Fidelio, a competition for composers of piano repertoire, with his piano solo Indiscrezione, a piece from his upcoming collection Les Phantasmes. In early May, he was awarded second prize for Composition, Professional II at the Swendsen and Grieg Competition in Norway.

=== Writing and painting ===
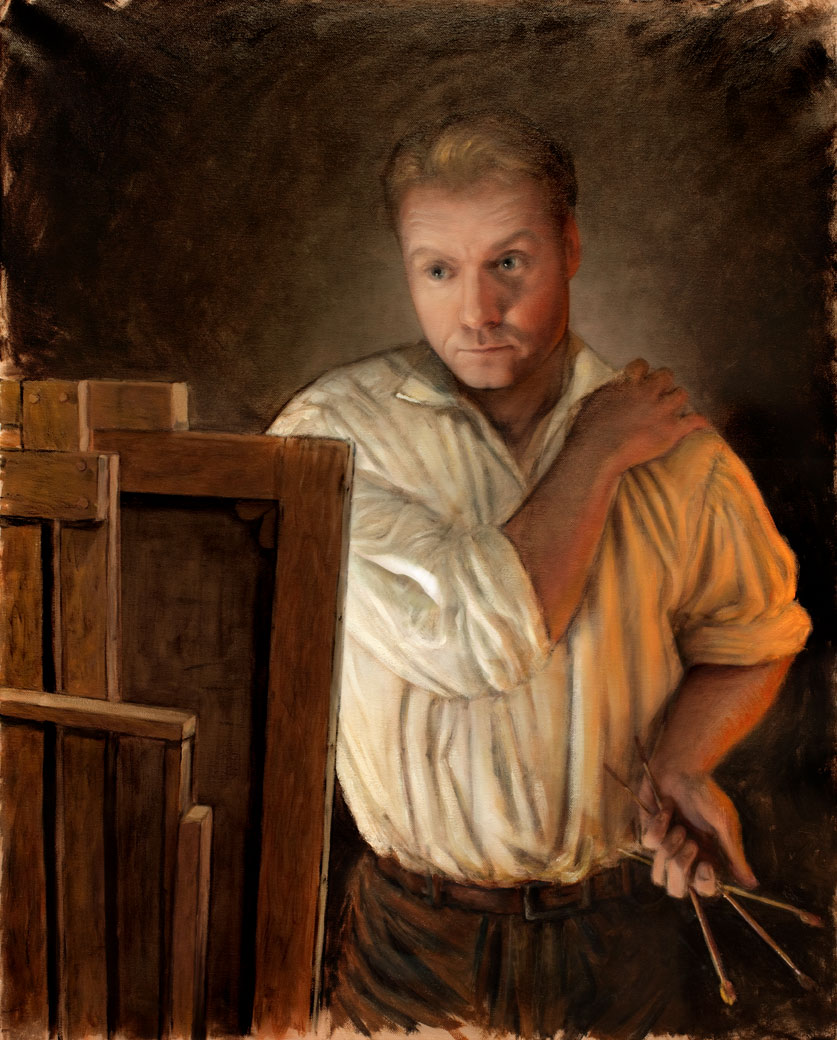
Self Portrait As A Disappointed Artist, 2010

As of 2022, Sander has written about a dozen novels and short story collections in Estonian and English. Sander's novel Litsid (The Whores) was the best-seller with the book dealer "Apollo" and at number two with the dealer Rahva Raamat for week 32 in 2015. Part II was published in 2017; in the Estonian Libraries Most Checked-Out Books in 2017 list, parts I and II occupied first and second position. Part III was published in December 2019. Sander has created, scripted and directed a historical drama series based on this trilogy. Season I premiered on Estonia's TV3 in February 2018. At the Estonian Entertainment Awards 2018, The Whores was nominated in two categories (Best TV Series Of The Year and Best Actress Of The Year - Merle Palmiste won for her leading role in the series). In April 2019, it was announced that the series has been purchased by the US, Russian and Spanish distributors. For the Estonian Film and TV Awards (EFTA) 2019, The Whores was nominated in three categories: Best TV Series, Best Actress (Merle Palmiste) and Best Script (Mart Sander). It won the Best TV Series of 2018 award. In September 2019, US film and TV site WeAreCult published a positive review of the series, predicting it "could grab a Downton Abbey-esque following due to the period trappings and compelling dramatic through-line". The second season The Women's War was launched on Go3 in November 2020.

Sander's collection of short stories Eerie Fairy Tales (with author's illustrations) hit the shelves on 1 May 2019, and finished the first week as No. 5 on the best seller list, remaining on the Top Ten List for five weeks. It was soon turned into a feature film, which premiered on 13 December 2019. The third book in The Whores - series was launched on 14 December 2019. The international rights to the novel trilogy have been acquired by the Scandinavian media giant Bonnier Group; the first to publish the translation is the oldest and largest Finnish publishing company, WSOY, who launched the series early in 2022.

Sander's young adult magical realism novel Ravengold was released for Christmas 2022 and finished the first week on the best seller list (No. 2 in Youth Literature, No. 6 overall), climbing to No. 1 in Youth Literature on the first week of January, 2023. In September 2024, the gothic romance Whispers in the Paint was released in Tallinn, quickly rising to the top of the charts, reaching No. 1 on week 37. Mart Sander has since announced plans to adapt the novel for the screen and has already presented a concept teaser, filmed on location in Italy. 2025 has seen two book releases so far: The Rose Key, a collection of short stories, was published in May, followed by the young adult novel Nameless Violet in June. The latter received a 9/10 rating from a jury of young readers and debuted at No. 1 on Estonia’s national book sales chart. The Rose Key is also being adapted for stage and screen, with its premiere scheduled for 27 June at Mehntack Manor. His massive historical novel The Goddess of the Devil is scheduled for international release in 2026; the book was the finalist for the CYGNUS Book Awards for Science Fiction in 2020.

In the summer of 2025, two new books by Mart Sander were released. Nameless Violet, a young adult novel featuring the author’s own illustrations, received enthusiastic praise from a jury of young readers, earning a score of 9/10. The book went on to spend four consecutive weeks at the top of Apollo Books’ bestseller list. The Rose Key, a collection of mystery short stories, also garnered strong reviews and was swiftly adapted for the stage, directed by Sander himself. In 2026, Sander published Object M: Estonia’s Buried Mystery in both English and Estonian editions (August). His novel Peaksime rääkima Raimondist (We Need to Talk About Raimond), exploring the life of Estonian composer Raimond Valgre, followed in October 2026. Both books reached number one on Estonian bestseller charts.

Sander became the member of the Estonian Writers' Association in 2022.

Sander's first solo exhibition took place in Tallinn in July and August 2008, followed by numerous solo and group exhibitions in subsequent years, including three solo exhibitions in 2026. He opened his own art gallery in 2007 in the center of Tallinn. In 2012, Sander's art gallery was involved in a case involving art forgeries; charges were brought against one of the assistants working in the gallery. He has also had personal exhibitions in Moscow and Saint Petersburg.

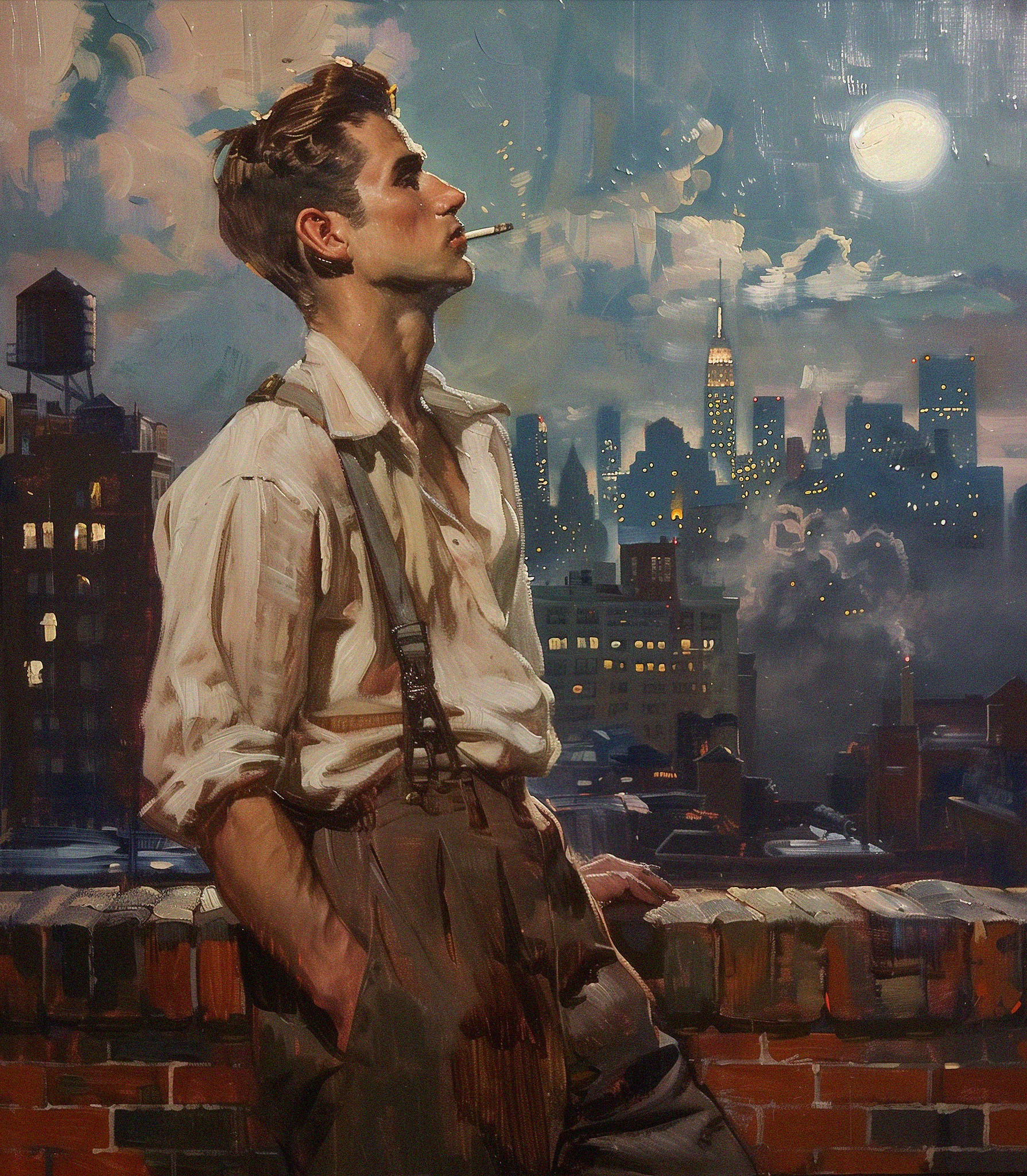
Painting by Mart Sander, finalist at the ARC Salon 2024.

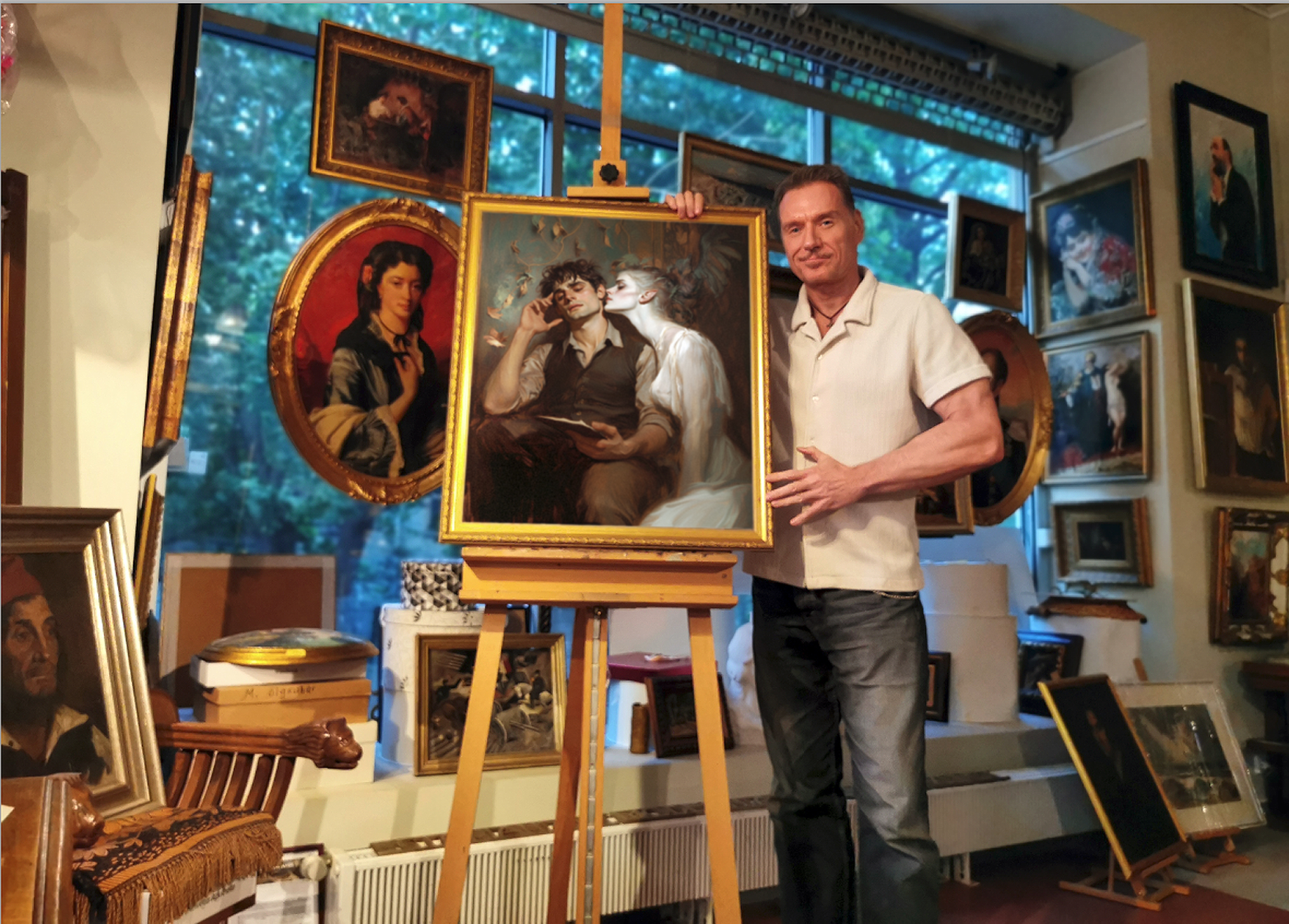
Mart Sander and his 2025 painting "The Sick Poet"

His painting Urban Hunter made it to the finals of the 10th Annual ARC Salon (2013-2014), the largest and most prestigious competition in the western world for realist artists. His Officer Of the Napoleonic Wars was the finalist of the 14th Salon (2019) and his New York Dreams was the finalist in 2024. In the 2025/26 Salon, two of his paintings - The Loser and The Sick Poet - were among the finalists, with The Sick Poet receiving the Honorary Mention.

=== Personal ===
As a teenager Sander became interested in Catholicism, and was baptised. His baptismal name is Martin Laurent.

In 2003, he was knighted into the Order of St. Stanislaus in Vienna, where he currently serves as the Prior of Estonia.

He is 195 cm tall.
