= Estonia in the Eurovision Song Contest 2008 =

- Eurovision Song Contest 2008
- Participating broadcaster: Eesti Rahvusringhääling (ERR)
- Country: Estonia
- Selection process: Eurolaul 2008
- Selection date: 2 February 2008

Competing entry
- Song: "Leto svet"
- Artist: Kreisiraadio
- Songwriters: Priit Pajusaar; Tarmo Leinatamm; Hannes Võrno; Peeter Oja; Glen Pilvre

Placement
- Semi-final result: Failed to qualify (18th)

Participation chronology

Estonia was represented at the Eurovision Song Contest 2008 with the song "Leto svet", written by Priit Pajusaar, Tarmo Leinatamm, Hannes Võrno, Peeter Oja, and Glen Pilvre, and performed by the group Kreisiraadio. The Estonian participating broadcaster, Eesti Rahvusringhääling (ERR), organised the national final Eurolaul 2008 in order to select its entry for the contest. Ten songs competed in the national final and the winner was selected over two rounds of public voting. In the first round, the top three were selected to qualify to the superfinal. In the superfinal, "Leto svet" performed by Kreisiraadio was selected as the winner.

Estonia was drawn to compete in the first semi-final of the Eurovision Song Contest which took place on 20 May 2008. Performing during the show in position 3, "Leto svet" was not announced among the 10 qualifying entries of the first semi-final and therefore did not qualify to compete in the final. It was later revealed that Estonia placed eighteenth out of the 19 participating countries in the semi-final with 8 points.

== Background ==
Prior to the 2008 contest, Eesti Televisioon (ETV) had participated in the Eurovision Song Contest representing Estonia thirteen times since its first entry in 1994, winning the contest on one occasion: in 2001 with the song "Everybody" performed by Tanel Padar, Dave Benton, and 2XL. Following the introduction of semi-finals for the 2004 contest, Estonia had, to this point, yet to qualify to the final. In 2007, "Partners in Crime" performed by Gerli Padar failed to qualify to the final where the song placed twenty-second in the semi-final.

After a restructuring that led to the incorporation of ETV into the current Eesti Rahvusringhääling (ERR) on 1 June 2007, it was the latter who participated in the 2008 contest. As part of its duties as participating broadcaster, ERR organised the selection of its entry in the Eurovision Song Contest and broadcast the event in the country. Since their debut, the Estonian broadcaster has organised national finals that feature a competition among multiple artists and songs in order to select its entry for the Eurovision Song Contest. The Eurolaul competition has been organised since 1996, and on 17 September 2007, ERR announced the organisation of Eurolaul 2008 in order to select its 2008 entry.

== Before Eurovision ==
=== Eurolaul 2008 ===
Eurolaul 2008 was the fifteenth edition of the Estonian national selection Eurolaul, organised by ERR to select its entry for the Eurovision Song Contest 2008. The competition consisted of a ten-song final on 2 February 2008 at the ERR studios in Tallinn, hosted by Marko Reikop and Eda-Ines Etti and broadcast on ETV as well as streamed online at the broadcaster's official website etv.ee and the official Eurovision Song Contest website eurovision.tv.

==== Competing entries ====
On 2 October 2007, ERR opened the submission period for artists and composers to submit their entries up until 26 October 2007. All artists and composers were required to have Estonian citizenship or be a permanent resident of Estonia. 58 submissions were received by the deadline. An 11-member jury panel selected five finalists from the submissions, while an additional five finalists were selected by ERR via composers directly invited for the competition: Alar Kotkas, Elmar Liitmaa, Hendrik Sal-Saller, Priit Pajusaar and Rein Rannap. The selected songs were announced during the ETV program Kes pääses finaali? on 1 December 2007. The selection jury consisted of Toomas Puna (Raadio Sky+ program director), Alari Kivisaar (Raadio Sky+ presenter), Allan Roosileht (Star FM presenter), Andres Panksep (Raadio Uuno chief editor), Ahto Kruusmann (Raadio Uuno presenter), Raul Saaremets (Raadio 2 program director), Olev Ehrlich (Vikerraadio head of music), Ivan Makarov (Raadio 4 music editor), Owe Petersell (Raadio Elmar chief editor), Koit Raudsepp (Raadio 2 presenter) and Sven Lõhmus (composer).

| Artist | Song | Songwriter(s) | Selection |
|---|---|---|---|
| Birgit Õigemeel | "365 Days" | Pearu Paulus, Alar Kotkas, Ilmar Laisaar, Jana Hallas | Invited by ERR |
| Iiris Vesik | "Ice-Cold Story" | Riine Pajusaar | Open submission |
| Kreisiraadio | "Leto svet" | Priit Pajusaar, Tarmo Leinatamm, Hannes Võrno, Peeter Oja, Glen Pilvre | Invited by ERR |
| Kristjan Kasearu and Paradise Crew | "Üksinduses" | Madis Muul, Kristjan Kasearu | Open submission |
| Luisa Värk and Traffic | "It's Never Too Late" | Imre Sooäär, Riina Kindlam | Open submission |
| Margus Vaher and Luisa Värk | "God Inside Your Soul" | Elmar Liitmaa, Liis Lass | Invited by ERR |
| Rolf Junior | "One on One" | Vahur Valgmaa | Open submission |
| Ska Faktor | "Real Big Money" | Taavi Otsus | Open submission |
| Supernova | "Stefani" | Rainer Michelson, Hendrik Sal-Saller | Invited by ERR |
| Taavi Peterson | "Question Man" | Rein Rannap, Karl Martin Sinijärv | Invited by ERR |

==== Final ====
The final took place on 2 February 2008. Ten songs competed during the show and the winner was selected over two rounds of public televoting. In the first round, the top three entries proceeded to the second round, and in the second round, "Leto svet" performed by Kreisiraadio was selected as the winner entirely by a public televote. The public vote registered 64,851 votes in the first round and 96,471 votes in the superfinal. In addition to the performances of the competing entries, Sahlene, who represented Estonia in 2002, and Gerli Padar, who represented Estonia in 2007, with Taavi Langdi performed as the interval acts.

Final – 2 February 2008
| R/O | Artist | Song | Televote | Place |
|---|---|---|---|---|
| 1 | Kreisiraadio | "Leto svet" | 31,429 | 1 |
| 2 | Ska Faktor | "Real Big Money" | 1,444 | 6 |
| 3 | Rolf Junior | "One on One" | 2,660 | 4 |
| 4 | Taavi Peterson | "Question Man" | 837 | 9 |
| 5 | Kristjan Kasearu and Paradise Crew | "Üksinduses" | 1,189 | 7 |
| 6 | Birgit Õigemeel | "365 Days" | 6,699 | 3 |
| 7 | Luisa Värk and Traffic | "It's Never Too Late" | 866 | 8 |
| 8 | Supernova | "Stefani" | 646 | 10 |
| 9 | Iiris Vesik | "Ice-Cold Story" | 16,682 | 2 |
| 10 | Margus Vaher and Luisa Värk | "God Inside Your Soul" | 2,399 | 5 |

Superfinal – 2 February 2008
| R/O | Artist | Song | Televote | Place |
|---|---|---|---|---|
| 1 | Kreisiraadio | "Leto svet" | 52,518 | 1 |
| 2 | Birgit Õigemeel | "365 Days" | 12,990 | 3 |
| 3 | Iiris Vesik | "Ice-Cold Story" | 30,963 | 2 |

== At Eurovision ==
It was announced in September 2007 that the competition's format would be expanded to two semi-finals in 2008. According to the rules, all nations with the exceptions of the host country and the "Big Four" (France, Germany, Spain, and the United Kingdom) are required to qualify from one of two semi-finals in order to compete for the final; the top nine songs from each semi-final as determined by televoting progress to the final, and a tenth was determined by back-up juries. The European Broadcasting Union (EBU) split up the competing countries into six different pots based on voting patterns from previous contests, with countries with favourable voting histories put into the same pot. On 28 January 2008, an allocation draw was held which placed each country into one of the two semi-finals. Estonia was placed into the first semi-final, to be held on 20 May 2008. The running order for the semi-finals was decided through another draw on 17 March 2008 and Estonia was set to perform in position 3, following the entry from Israel and before the entry from Moldova.

The two semi-finals and the final were broadcast in Estonia on ETV with commentary by Marko Reikop. ERR appointed Sahlene, who represented Estonia in 2002, as its spokesperson to announce the Estonian votes during the final.

=== Semi-final ===
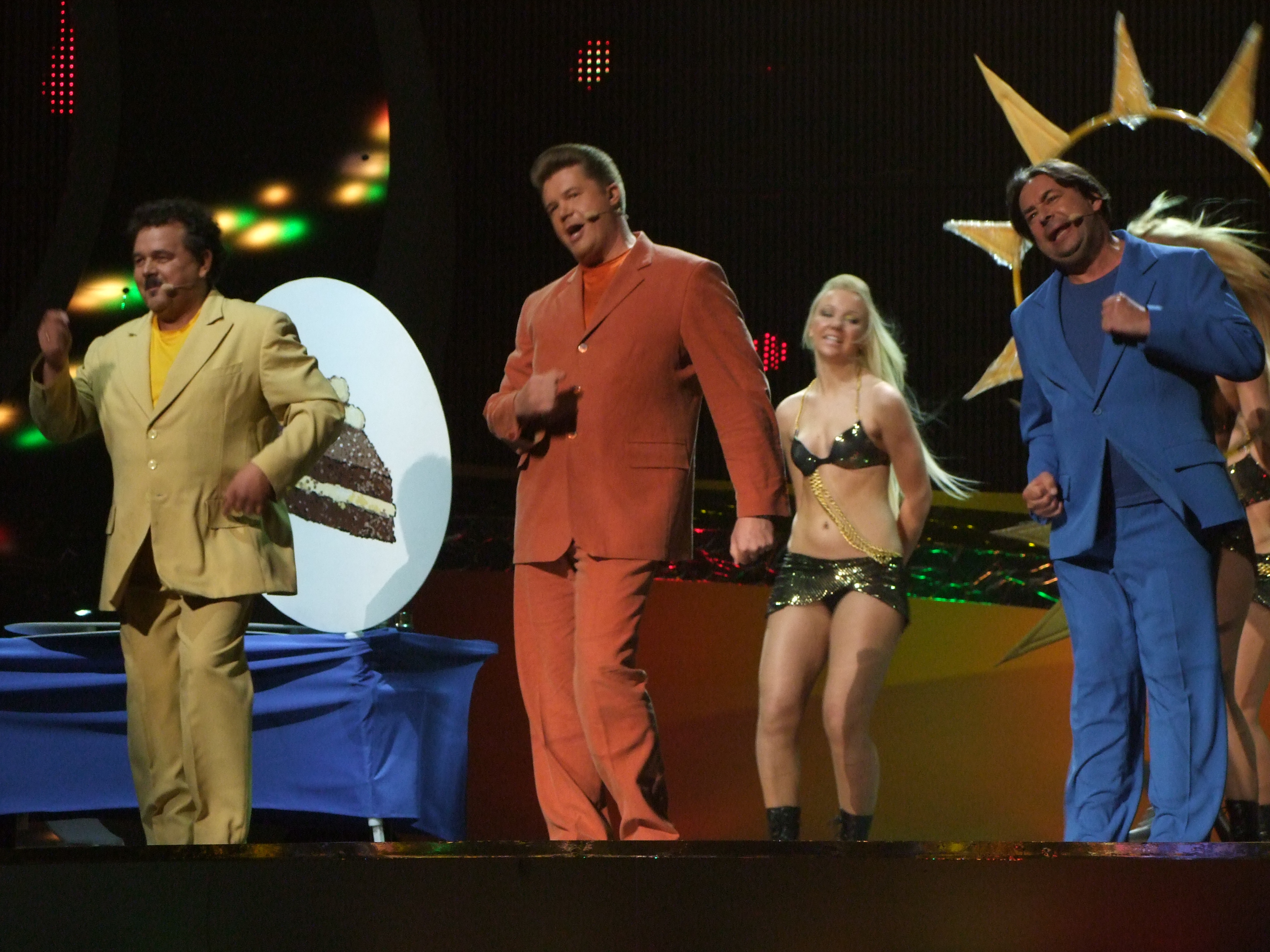
Kreisiraadio during a rehearsal before the first semi-final

Kreisiraadio took part in technical rehearsals on 11 and 15 May, followed by dress rehearsals on 19 and 20 May. The Estonian performance featured the members of Kreisiraadio performing on stage in yellow, red and blue suits and joined by three dancers in golden tops waving big signs as well as the Serbian, Estonian, German and Finnish flags: Kauna Kõrge-Hårajuvet, Laura Lambut and Merit Reigam. The stage displayed green, yellow and red colours and the song title "Leto svet" appeared on the LED screens. The performance also featured the use of a non-functioning piano and an accordion.

At the end of the show, Estonia was not announced among the top 10 entries in the first semi-final and therefore failed to qualify to compete in the final. It was later revealed that Estonia placed 18th in the semi-final, receiving a total of 8 points.

=== Voting ===
Below is a breakdown of points awarded to Estonia and awarded by Estonia in the first semi-final and grand final of the contest. The nation awarded its 12 points to Finland in the semi-final and to Russia in the final of the contest.

==== Points awarded to Estonia ====
Points awarded to Estonia (Semi-final 1)
| Score | Country |
|---|---|
| 12 points | |
| 10 points | |
| 8 points | |
| 7 points | Finland |
| 6 points | |
| 5 points | |
| 4 points | |
| 3 points | |
| 2 points | |
| 1 point | Moldova |

==== Points awarded by Estonia ====
Points awarded by Estonia (Semi-final 1)
| Score | Country |
|---|---|
| 12 points | Finland |
| 10 points | Russia |
| 8 points | Norway |
| 7 points | Ireland |
| 6 points | Belgium |
| 5 points | Greece |
| 4 points | Azerbaijan |
| 3 points | Andorra |
| 2 points | Armenia |
| 1 point | Bosnia and Herzegovina |

Points awarded by Estonia (Final)
| Score | Country |
|---|---|
| 12 points | Russia |
| 10 points | Finland |
| 8 points | Norway |
| 7 points | Latvia |
| 6 points | France |
| 5 points | Georgia |
| 4 points | Ukraine |
| 3 points | Denmark |
| 2 points | Sweden |
| 1 point | Greece |
