= Estonia in the Eurovision Song Contest 2007 =

- Eurovision Song Contest 2007
- Participating broadcaster: Eesti Televisioon (ETV)
- Country: Estonia
- Selection process: Eurolaul 2007
- Selection date: 3 February 2007

Competing entry
- Song: "Partners in Crime"
- Artist: Gerli Padar
- Songwriters: Berit Veiber; Hendrik Sal-Saller

Placement
- Semi-final result: Failed to qualify (22nd)

Participation chronology

Estonia was represented at the Eurovision Song Contest 2007 with the song "Partners in Crime", composed by Berit Veiber, with lyrics by Hendrik Sal-Saller, and performed by Gerli Padar. The Estonian participating broadcaster, Eesti Televisioon (ETV), organised the national final Eurolaul 2007 in order to select its entry for the contest. Ten songs competed in the national final and the winner was selected over two rounds of public voting. In the first round, the top three were selected to qualify to the superfinal. In the superfinal, "Partners in Crime" performed by Gerli Padar was selected as the winner.

Estonia competed in the semi-final of the Eurovision Song Contest which took place on 10 May 2007. Performing during the show in position 23, "Partners in Crime" was not announced among the top 10 entries of the semi-final and therefore did not qualify to compete in the final. It was later revealed that Estonia placed twenty-second out of the 28 participating countries in the semi-final with 33 points.

== Background ==
Prior to the 2007 contest, Eesti Televisioon (ETV) had participated in the Eurovision Song Contest representing Estonia twelve times since its first entry in 1994, winning the contest on one occasion: in 2001 with the song "Everybody" performed by Tanel Padar, Dave Benton, and 2XL. Following the introduction of semi-finals for the 2004, Estonia has, to this point, yet to qualify to the final. In 2006, "Through My Window" performed by Sandra failed to qualify to the final where it placed eighteenth in the semi-final.

As part of its duties as participating broadcaster, ETV organises the selection of its entry in the Eurovision Song Contest and broadcasts the event in the country. Since its debut, the broadcaster has organised national finals that feature a competition among multiple artists and songs in order to select its entry for the contest. ETV has organised Eurolaul competition since 1996 in order to select its entry and on 13 October 2006, the broadcaster announced the organisation of Eurolaul 2007 in order to select its 2007 entry.

== Before Eurovision ==
=== Eurolaul 2007 ===
Eurolaul 2007 was the fourteenth edition of the national selection Eurolaul, organised by ETV to select its entry for the Eurovision Song Contest 2007. The competition consisted of a ten-song final on 3 February 2007 at the ETV studios in Tallinn, hosted by Marko Reikop and Maarja-Liis Ilus and broadcast on ETV as well as streamed online at the broadcaster's official website etv.ee. The national final was watched by 302,000 viewers in Estonia.

==== Competing entries ====
The 10 finalists were selected by ETV via composers directly invited for the competition. The composers, who had to submit their entries up until 11 December 2006, both created the song and selected the performer for their entries. The names of the composers that were invited to participate were announced on 13 October 2006 and were:

- Alar Kotkas, Pearu Paulus and Ilmar Laisaar
- Eda-Ines Etti
- Elmar Liitmaa
- Hendrik Sal-Saller
- Koit Toome
- Kristjan Kasearu
- Lenna Kuurmaa
- Priit Pajusaar and Glen Pilvre
- Soul Militia
- Sven Lõhmus

The selected songs were announced on 27 January 2007. Among the competing artists were previous Eurovision Song Contest entrants Koit Toome (who represented Estonia in 1998), the group Ines (who represented Estonia in 2000), Soul Militia (who won Eurovision for Estonia in 2001 as part of 2XL together with Tanel Padar and Dave Benton), Laura Põldvere (who represented Estonia in 2005 as part of the group Suntribe), and Vanilla Ninja (which represented Switzerland in 2005). Deva Deva Dance and Gerli Padar have both competed in previous editions of Eurolaul.

Artist	Song	Songwriter(s)
Deva Deva Dance	"Supreme Nature"	Arne Lauri, Priit Pajusaar, Glen Pilvre
Gerli Padar	"Partners in Crime"	Berit Veiber, Hendrik Sal-Saller
Hele Kõre and Kristjan Kasearu	"Romeo ja Julia"	Jaagup Kreem, Elmar Liitmaa
Ines	"In Good and Bad"	Eda-Ines Etti, Ivo Etti
Koit Toome	"Veidi veel"	Fred Krieger, Berit Veiber, Koit Toome
Kristjan Kasearu and Paradise Crew	"So Much to Say"	Kristjan Kasearu, Madis Muul
Laura Põldvere	"Sunflowers"	Sven Lõhmus
Linda	"One Year From Now"	Pearu Paulus, Alar Kotkas, Ilmar Laisaar, Jana Hallas
Soul Militia	"My Place"	Kaido Põldma, Lauri Pihlap
Vanilla Ninja	"Birds of Peace"	Lenna Kuurmaa, Piret Järvis, Elmar Liitmaa

==== Final ====
The final took place on 3 February 2007. Ten songs competed during the show and the winner was selected over two rounds of public televoting. In the first round, the top three entries proceeded to the superfinal; the public vote in the first round registered 55,324 votes. In the superfinal, "Partners in Crime" performed by Gerli Padar was selected as the winner entirely by a public televote. The public televote in the superfinal registered 118,949 votes, with votes only counting towards the top three songs.

Final – 3 February 2007
R/O	Artist	Song	Televote	Place
1	Kristjan Kasearu and Paradise Crew	"So Much to Say"	1,771	7
2	Deva Deva Dance	"Supreme Nature"	1,543	9
3	Koit Toome	"Veidi veel"	1,371	10
4	Laura Põldvere	"Sunflowers"	8,170	3
5	Gerli Padar	"Partners in Crime"	16,759	1
6	Vanilla Ninja	"Birds of Peace"	7,552	4
7	Linda	"One Year From Now"	1,701	8
8	Soul Militia	"My Place"	4,524	5
9	Ines	"In Good and Bad"	2,583	6
10	Hele Kõre and Kristjan Kasearu	"Romeo ja Julia"	9,350	2

Superfinal – 3 February 2007
R/O	Artist	Song	Televote	Place
1	Laura Põldvere	"Sunflowers"	25,896	3
2	Gerli Padar	"Partners in Crime"	55,416	1
3	Hele Kõre and Kristjan Kasearu	"Romeo ja Julia"	36,881	2

== At Eurovision ==
According to Eurovision rules, all nations with the exceptions of the host country, the "Big Four" (France, Germany, Spain, and the United Kingdom) and the ten highest placed finishers in the 2006 contest are required to qualify from the semi-final on 10 May 2007 in order to compete for the final on 12 May 2007; the top ten countries from the semi-final progress to the final. On 12 March 2007, an allocation draw was held which determined the running order for the semi-final and Estonia was set to perform in position 23, following the entry from Hungary and before the entry from Belgium.

The semi-final and the final were broadcast in Estonia on ETV with commentary by Marko Reikop. ETV appointed Laura Põldvere as its spokesperson to announce the Estonian votes during the final.

=== Semi-final ===
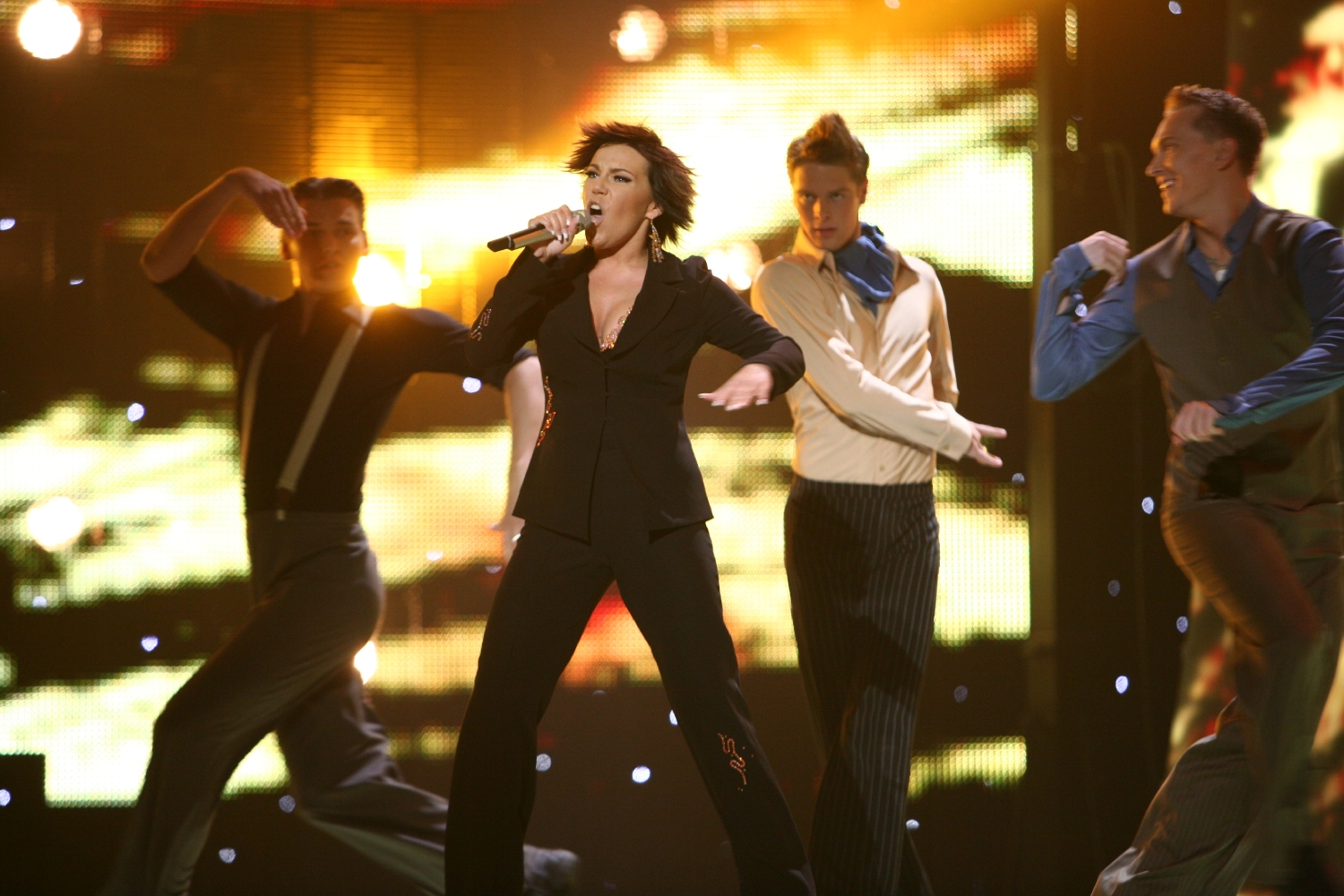
Gerli Padar performing during the semi-final

Gerli Padar took part in technical rehearsals on 3 and 4 May, followed by dress rehearsals on 9 and 10 May. The Estonian performance featured Gerli Padar performing a choreographed routine on stage in a black catsuit with three dancers: Aleksandr Makarov, Marko Kiigajaan and Martin Parmas. The stage displayed gold and black colours at the beginning which transitioned to blue, white and black colours with graffiti-style scrawl appearing on the LED screens and circular patterns of spotlights appearing in time to the music behind the performers. The performance, which began with Padar being carried in on the shoulders of the dancers, also featured the use of a wind machine. Gerli Padar was also joined by two backing vocalists: Johanna Münter and Mirjam Mesak.

At the end of the show, Estonia was not announced among the top 10 entries in the semi-final and therefore failed to qualify to compete in the final. It was later revealed that Estonia placed 23rd in the semi-final, receiving a total of 33 points.

=== Voting ===
Below is a breakdown of points awarded to Estonia and awarded by Estonia in the semi-final and grand final of the contest. The nation awarded its 12 points to Latvia in the semi-final and to Russia in the final of the contest.

==== Points awarded to Estonia ====
Points awarded to Estonia (Semi-final)
Score	Country
12 points	Latvia
10 points	
8 points	
7 points	
6 points	Finland; Lithuania
5 points	
4 points	Moldova
3 points	Ireland
2 points	Georgia
1 point	

==== Points awarded by Estonia ====
Points awarded by Estonia (Semi-final)
Score	Country
12 points	Latvia
10 points	Georgia
8 points	Hungary
7 points	Belarus
6 points	Iceland
5 points	Andorra
4 points	Norway
3 points	Israel
2 points	Switzerland
1 point	Czech Republic

Points awarded by Estonia (Final)
Score	Country
12 points	Russia
10 points	Latvia
8 points	Ukraine
7 points	Belarus
6 points	Finland
5 points	Georgia
4 points	Hungary
3 points	Germany
2 points	France
1 point	Bulgaria
