= Kreisiraadio =

Estonian comedy act

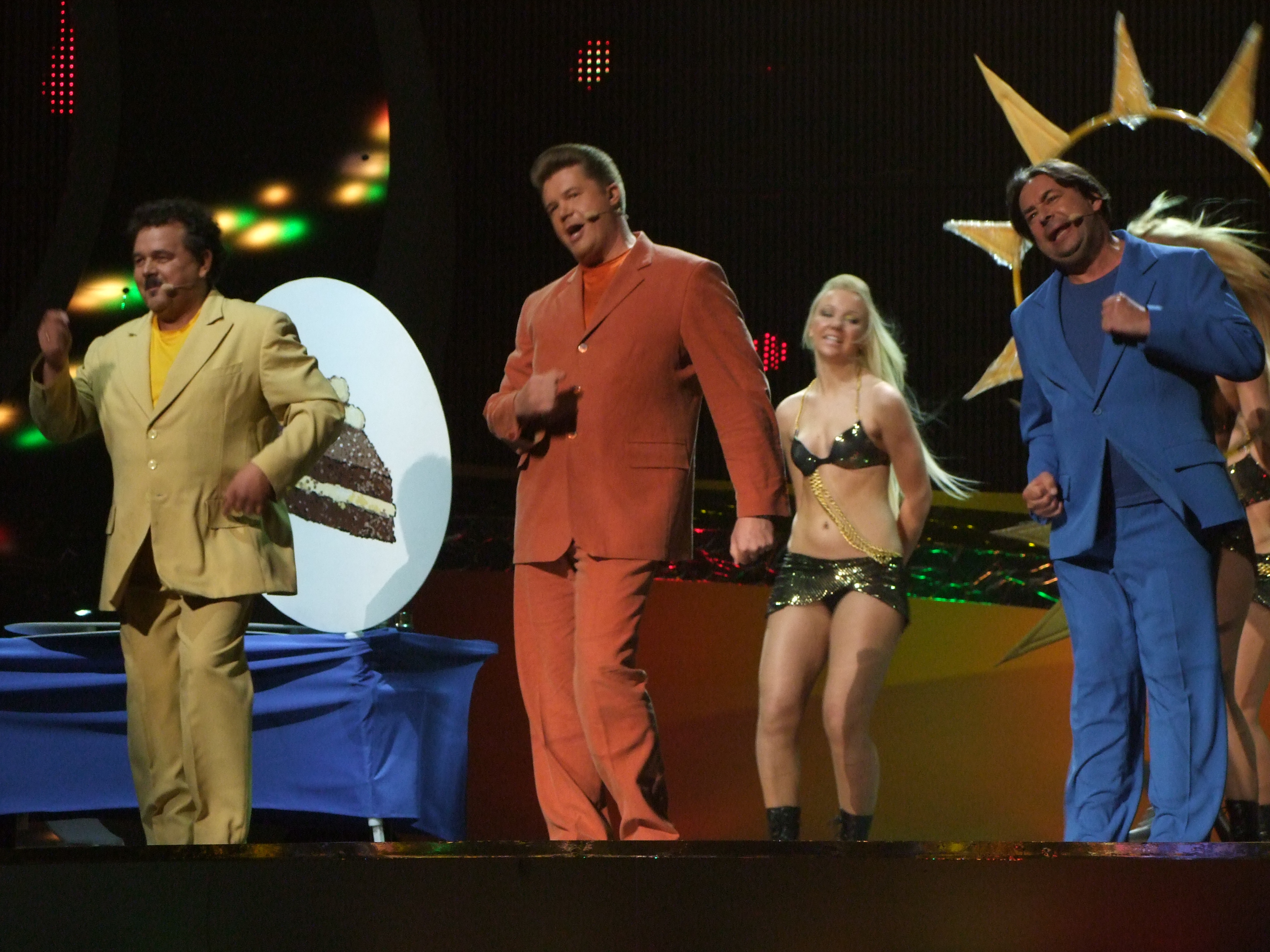
- Kreisiraadio in Eurovision Song Contest 2008

Background information
- Also known as: Crazy Radio
- Origin: Tallinn, Estonia
- Years active: 1993–2014
- Past members: Hannes Võrno; Peeter Oja; Tarmo Leinatamm

Kreisiraadio was an Estonian comedy act, made up of Hannes Võrno, Peeter Oja and Tarmo Leinatamm.

They have been around since 1993 with radio and TV sketch shows. Their sketches have introduced the hazardous sport of stoneball, the character of the arrogant man with a flat hat and that of Alev Ström, the Estonian immigrant in Sweden talking nonsense Swedish much in the same way that their Eurovision Song Contest 2008 submission "Leto svet" (Summer Light) uses nonsense Serbian (along with Finnish and German).

Tarmo Leinatamm died on October 13, 2014 due to cancer.

== See also ==
- Estonia in the Eurovision Song Contest 2008

Awards and achievements
Preceded by Gerli Padar with "Partners in Crime"	Estonia in the Eurovision Song Contest; 2008	Succeeded by Urban Symphony with "Rändajad"
