= Dagmar Oja =

Estonian singer

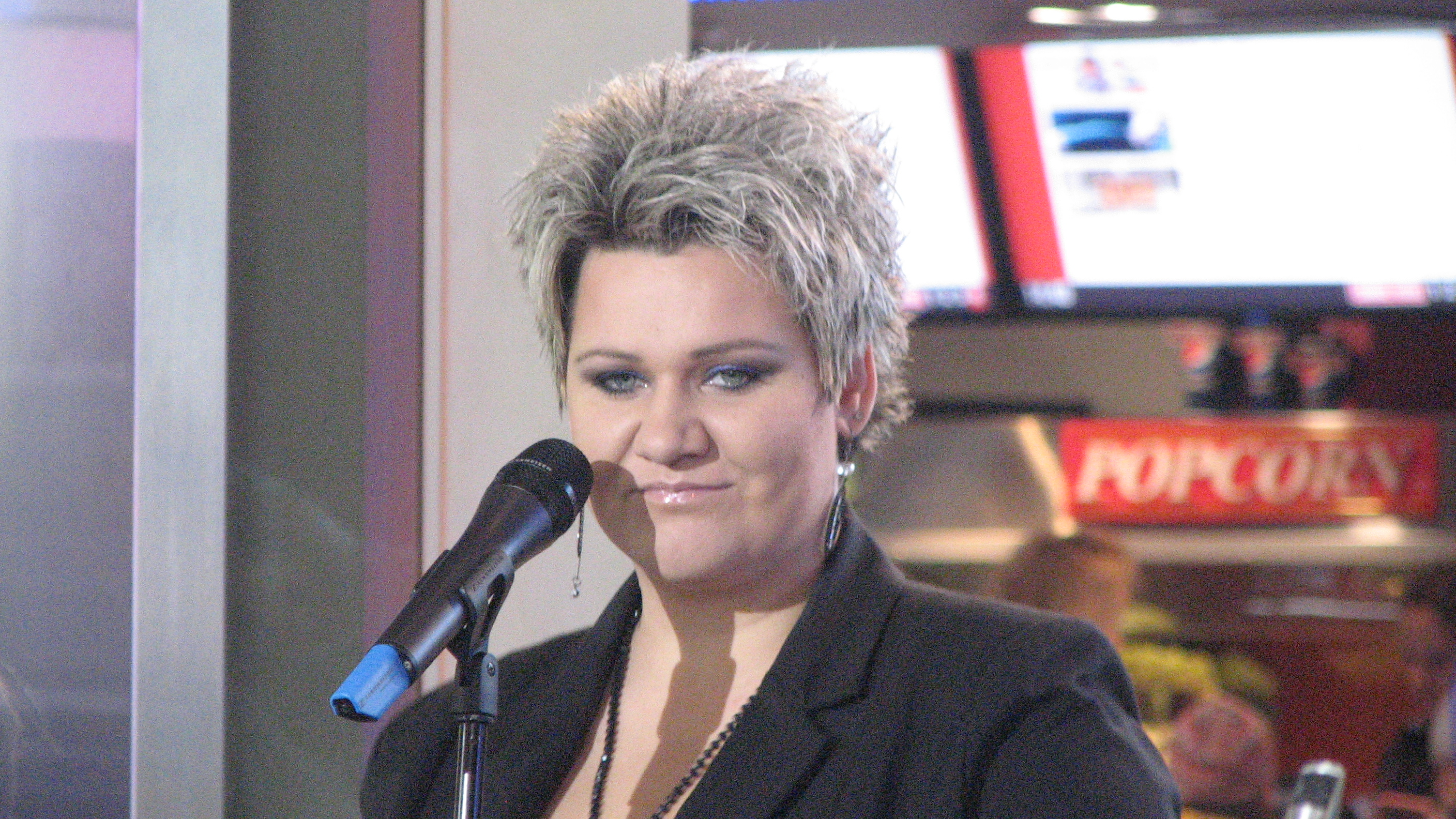
Dagmar Oja

Dagmar Oja (born 8 July 1981) is an Estonian singer.

== Life ==
Oja was born in Avinurme, Jõgeva County. She graduated from the Georg Ots Music School of Tallinn, and become known as a backing singer for different pop acts of Estonia, such as Anne Veski, Maarja-Liis Ilus, Eda-Ines Etti and Ithaka Maria.

Dagmar Oja has repeatedly performed at the Eurovision Song Contest as a backing singer. In 2002 she provided backing vocals for Ira Losco who represented Malta that year, and in 2006 she did the same for Sandra Oxenryd who sang "Through My Window" for Estonia. In 2016, she provided vocal support for Jüri Pootsmann, the Estonian representative at the Eurovision Song Contest held in Stockholm, in the 2017 contest for Koit Toome and Laura Põldvere, in 2019 for Victor Crone and for Vanilla Ninja in the 2026 contest. She is also involved with Estonia's 2020 entry, "What Love Is".

She has been cast in stage musicals like "Billy Elliot" and "Anything Goes" as a chorus member.
