= 20 (Terminaator album) =

2007 album by Terminaator

Greatest hits album by Terminaator
- Released: 2007
- Recorded: 1991–2007
- Genre: Rock
- Length: 132:12
- Label: Terminaator Music

Terminaator chronology
| 'Nagu esimene kord' (2006) | 20 (2007) | 'Ingli puudutus' (2009) |

20 is the eleventh album by Estonian rock band Terminaator, released in 2007. It is a greatest hits album. The title refers to the twentieth anniversary of the band. The mascot on the cover is drawn by Mart Himbek. The tracks include concert recordings, new versions and new songs. The album has a booklet with information about the songs and has many photos.

== Track listing ==
T
| No. | Title | Writer(s) | English translation | Length |
|---|---|---|---|---|
| 1. | "Juulikuu lumi 2007" | J. Kreem/J. Kreem | Snow of July | 4:48 |
| 2. | "Ära oota koidikuni" | J. Kreem/J. Kreem | Don't wait till the dawn | 3:01 |
| 3. | "Alkeemik" | E. Liitmaa/J. Kreem | Alchemist | 4:30 |
| 4. | "4B 2007" | E. Liitmaa/J. Kreem | | 5:19 |
| 5. | "Lõbus maja" | E. Liitmaa/J. Kreem/Terminaator | Fun house | 3:40 |
| 6. | "Sinu juurde tagasi" | J. Kreem/J. Kreem | Back to you | 4:08 |
| 7. | "Aja teenija" | J. Hakulinen/J. Kreem | The recruit | 5:25 |
| 8. | "6 jalga niisket maad" | J. Kreem/J. Kreem | 6 feet of moist land | 3:37 |
| 9. | "Plekktrumm" | I. Alanko/J. Kreem | Tin drum | 3:55 |
| 10. | "See ei ole saladus" | J. Kreem/J. Kreem | It is not a secret | 3:23 |
| 11. | "Raudteejaam" | J. Kreem/E. Liitmaa/J. Kreem | Railroad station | 4:44 |
| 12. | "Ei kommentaari" | J. Kreem/J. Kreem | No comments; lit: "won't comment" [incorrectly spelled, on purpose] | 4:53 |
| 13. | "Vastasmaja aknad" | J. Kreem/J. Kreem | The windows next door | 4:28 |
| 14. | "Ingli puudutus" | J. Kreem/J. Kreem | Touch of an angel | 8:25 |

R
| No. | Title | Writer(s) | English translation | Length |
|---|---|---|---|---|
| 1. | "Ebaõiglane" | J. Kreem/J. Kreem | Unfair | 3:43 |
| 2. | "Romula" | E. Liitmaa/J. Kreem | Wrecking yard | 3:04 |
| 3. | "Ütle miks" | J. Kreem/J. Kreem | Tell me why | 3:04 |
| 4. | "Carmen" | J. Kreem/J. Kreem | | 3:25 |
| 5. | "Kuutõbine" | J. Kreem/J. Kreem | Sleepwalker | 3:49 |
| 6. | "Nagu esimene kord" | E. Liitmaa/J. Kreem | Like on the first time | 3:44 |
| 7. | "Teel ära" | A. Veimer/A. Veimer | Away on the road | 4:42 |
| 8. | "Portselanist tüdruk" | J. Kreem/J. Kreem | Porcelain girl | 3:09 |
| 9. | "Kaktusviin" | E. Liitmaa/J. Kreem | Cactus spirit | 4:57 |
| 10. | "Armudes üksindusse" | A. Veimer/A. Veimer | Falling in love with loneliness | 5:45 |
| 11. | "Ford" | J. Kreem/J. Kreem | | 3:47 |
| 12. | "Kaitseta" | J. Kreem/Sulliwan/J. Kreem | Defenseless | 4:51 |
| 13. | "Tänapäeva muinaslugu" | E. Liitmaa/J. Kreem | Today's fairy tale | 5:15 |
| 14. | "Torm" | J. Kreem/J. Kreem | Storm | 5:32 |
| 15. | "Muinasjutu mets" | E. Liitmaa/J. Kreem | Fairytale forest | 3:40 |
| 16. | "Meeletu maailm" | A. Veimer/A. Veimer | Crazy world | 5:06 |

== Song information ==
CD1

- Tracks 1, 4 are new versions of songs from "Minu väike paradiis".
- Tracks 2, 3 are entirely new songs.
- Track 5 from "Minu väike paradiis".
- Tracks 6, 7 from "Singapur".
- Tracks 8, 10, 11 from "Head uudised".
- Track 12 from "Nagu esimene kord".
- Track 13 from "Kuutõbine".
- Track 14 from "Kuld".

Recorded:

- 1995: 5
- 1997: 14
- 1998: 6, 7
- 2000: 8, 10, 11
- 2003: 13
- 2005: 9
- 2006: 12
- 2007: 1-4

CD2

- Tracks 1, 4, 14 from "Go Live 2005".
- Tracks 2, 5, 11 from "Kuutõbine".
- Track 3, 12 from "Kuld".
- Track 6 from "Nagu esimene kord".
- Tracks 7, 10 from the "R2 Live 2007" concert (with Kaire Vilgats and Dagmar Oja on vocals and Hele-Riin Uib on drums)
- Track 8 from "Head uudised".
- Track 9 is slightly renewed; from "Kuutõbine".
- Track 13 from "Risk".
- Track 16 from "Lõputu päev".

Recorded:

- 1991: 16
- 1997: 12, 15
- 2000: 8
- 2001: 13
- 2003: 2, 5, 11
- 2004: 9
- 2005: 1, 4, 14
- 2006: 6
- 2007: 7, 10

== Singles ==
- 2007: Juulikuu lumi 2007
- 2008: Ära oota koidikuni
