= Estonia in the Eurovision Song Contest 2006 =

- Eurovision Song Contest 2006
- Participating broadcaster: Eesti Televisioon (ETV)
- Country: Estonia
- Selection process: Eurolaul 2006
- Selection date: 4 February 2006

Competing entry
- Song: "Through My Window"
- Artist: Sandra Oxenryd
- Songwriters: Pearu Paulus; Ilmar Laisaar; Alar Kotkas; Jana Hallas

Placement
- Semi-final result: Failed to qualify (18th)

Participation chronology

Estonia was represented at the Eurovision Song Contest 2006 with the song "Through My Window", written by Pearu Paulus, Ilmar Laisaar, Alar Kotkas, and Jana Hallas, and performed by Sandra Oxenryd. The Estonian participating broadcaster, Eesti Televisioon (ETV), organised the national final Eurolaul 2006 in order to select its entry for the contest. Ten songs competed in the national final and "Through My Window" performed by Sandra Oxenryd was selected as the winner by a jury panel.

Estonia competed in the semi-final of the Eurovision Song Contest which took place on 18 May 2006. Performing during the show in position 21, "Through My Window" was not announced among the top 10 entries of the semi-final and therefore did not qualify to compete in the final. It was later revealed that Estonia placed eighteenth out of the 23 participating countries in the semi-final with 28 points.

== Background ==
Prior to the 2006 Contest, Eesti Televisioon (ETV) had participated in the Eurovision Song Contest representing Estonia eleven times since its first entry in 1994, winning the contest on one occasion: in 2001 with the song "Everybody" performed by Tanel Padar, Dave Benton, and 2XL. Following the introduction of semi-finals for the 2004, it has, to this point, yet to qualify to the final. In 2005, "Let's Get Loud" performed by Suntribe failed to qualify to the final where the song placed twentieth in the semi-final.

As part of its duties as participating broadcaster, ETV organises the selection of its entry in the Eurovision Song Contest and broadcasts the event in the country. Since its debut, the broadcaster has organised national finals that feature a competition among multiple artists and songs in order to select its entry for the contest. ETV has organised Eurolaul competition since 1996 in order to select its entry, and on 16 October 2005, the broadcaster announced the organisation of Eurolaul 2006 in order to select its 2006 entry.

== Before Eurovision ==
=== Eurolaul 2006 ===
Eurolaul 2006 was the thirteenth edition of the national selection Eurolaul, organised by ETV to select its entry for the Eurovision Song Contest 2006. The competition consisted of a ten-song final on 4 February 2006 at the ETV studios in Tallinn, hosted by Marko Reikop and Gerli Padar and broadcast on ETV. The national final was watched by 268,000 viewers in Estonia.

==== Competing entries ====
On 16 October 2005, ETV opened the submission period for artists and composers to submit their entries up until 5 December 2005. 76 submissions were received by the deadline. A 10-member jury panel selected six finalists from the submissions, while an additional four finalists were selected by ETV via composers directly invited for the competition: Alar Kotkas, Ivar Must, Mikk Targo and Priit Pajusaar. The selected songs were announced on 13 January 2006 and among the competing artists was previous Eurovision Song Contest entrant Ines, who represented Estonia in 2000. Glow, Noorkuu and Sofia Rubina have all competed in previous editions of Eurolaul. The selection jury consisted of Jaak Joala (musician), Priit Hõbemägi (culture critic), Jaan Elgula (musician), Olavi Pihlamägi (journalist), Maarja-Liis Ilus (singer), Maido Maadik (Eesti Raadio sound engineer), Jaan Karp (musician), Heidy Purga (television presenter), Olav Osolin (music critic) and Jaagup Kreem (musician).

Artist	Song	Songwriter(s)	Selection
Aphro Tito	"Sweet Separation"	Margus Lattik, Meelis Leis	Open submission
Carola Szücs	"It Was You"	Priit Pajusaar, Glen Pilvre, Maian Kärmas	Open submission
Glow	"Higher"	Peeter Kaljuste, Elmar Liitmaa, Marta Piigli	Open submission
Ines	"Iseendale"	Eda-Ines Etti, Ivo Etti	Open submission
Marilin Kongo	"Be 1st"	Ivar Must, Rebecca Kontus, James Werts	Invited by ERR
Meribel	"Mr Right"	Priit Pajusaar, Glen Pilvre, Maian Kärmas	Invited by ERR
Noorkuu	"Friends Will Be Friends"	Martti Meumers, Rein Kahro	Open submission
Reverend B and Crux	"Everytime I Tell You"	Bard Erik-Hallesby Norheim	Open submission
Sandra Oxenryd	"Through My Window"	Pearu Paulus, Ilmar Laisaar, Alar Kotkas, Jana Hallas	Invited by ERR
Sofia Rubina	"Open Up Your Heart"	Mikk Targo	Invited by ERR

==== Final ====
The final took place on 4 February 2006. Ten songs competed during the show and a jury selected "Through My Window" performed by Sandra Oxenryd as the winner. A non-competitive public televote registered 24,756 votes and selected "Mr Right" performed by Meribel as the winner. The jury panel that voted in the final consisted of Maja Tatić (Bosnian singer), Mariija Naumova (Latvian singer), Jürgen Meier-Beer (German television producer), Sietse Bakker (Dutch journalist), Jari Sillanpää (Finnish singer), John Groves (British music producer), Sandra Studer (Swiss singer and television presenter), Urša Vlašič (Slovenian lyricist), Björgvin Halldórsson (Icelandic singer) and Kobi Oshrat (Israeli conductor).

Final – 4 February 2006
R/O	Artist	Song	Jury Votes										Total	Place
R/O	Artist	Song	M. Tatić	M. Naumova	J. Meier-Beer	S. Bakker	J. Sillanpää	J. Groves	S. Studer	U. Vlašič	B. Halldórsson	K. Oshrat	Total	Place
1	Carola Szücs	"It Was You"	2	2	7	7	6	7	6	8	8	3	56	5
2	Sofia Rubina	"Open Up Your Heart"	3	4	4	5	7	8	8	3	4	5	51	7
3	Reverend B and Crux	"Everytime I Tell You"	5	3	6	3	3	4	2	2	1	1	30	10
4	Ines	"Iseendale"	4	8	10	12	5	12	12	7	12	2	84	2
5	Aphro Tito	"Sweet Separation"	10	1	3	2	1	2	1	4	3	6	33	9
6	Sandra Oxenryd	"Through My Window"	8	7	5	6	10	10	10	12	10	12	90	1
7	Glow	"Higher"	7	12	2	10	8	6	3	10	5	10	73	3
8	Marilin Kongo	"Be 1st"	1	10	1	4	4	5	5	1	2	8	41	8
9	Noorkuu	"Friends Will Be Friends"	6	5	8	8	2	3	7	6	6	4	55	6
10	Meribel	"Mr Right"	12	6	12	1	12	1	4	5	7	7	67	4

== At Eurovision ==
According to Eurovision rules, all nations with the exceptions of the host country, the "Big Four" (France, Germany, Spain and the United Kingdom) and the ten highest placed finishers in the 2005 contest are required to qualify from the semi-final on 18 May 2006 in order to compete for the final on 20 May 2006; the top ten countries from the semi-final progress to the final. On 21 March 2006, an allocation draw was held which determined the running order for the semi-final and Estonia was set to perform in position 21, following the entry from Sweden and before the entry from Bosnia and Herzegovina.

The semi-final and the final were broadcast in Estonia on ETV with commentary by Marko Reikop. ETV appointed Evelin Samuel (who had represented Estonia in 1999 together with Camille) as its spokesperson to announce the results of the Estonian televote during the final.

=== Semi-final ===
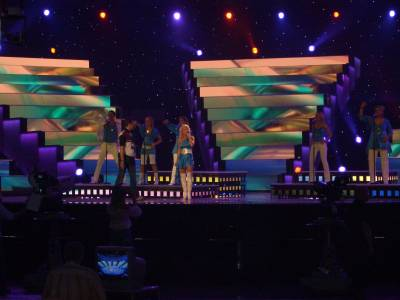
Sandra Oxenryd during a rehearsal before the semi-final

Sandra Oxenryd took part in technical rehearsals on 12 and 14 May, followed by dress rehearsals on 17 and 18 May. The Estonian performance featured Sandra Oxenryd performing on stage in a blue dress and white thigh boots with the stage displaying pink, yellow, purple and red colours. Sandra Oxenryd was joined by five backing vocalists, three of them which later joined Oxenryd from the raised parts of the stage that they stood on: Carita Nyström, Emma Andersson, Jacob Gyldenskog, Dagmar Oja and Jelena Juzvik.

At the end of the show, Estonia was not announced among the top 10 entries in the semi-final and therefore failed to qualify to compete in the final. It was later revealed that Estonia placed 18th in the semi-final, receiving a total of 28 points.

=== Voting ===
Below is a breakdown of points awarded to Estonia and awarded by Estonia in the semi-final and grand final of the contest. The nation awarded its 12 points to Finland in the semi-final and the final of the contest.

==== Points awarded to Estonia ====
Points awarded to Estonia (Semi-final)
Score	Country
12 points	
10 points	
8 points	Sweden
7 points	Latvia
6 points	
5 points	Finland; Monaco
4 points	
3 points	
2 points	Denmark
1 point	Ireland

==== Points awarded by Estonia ====
Points awarded by Estonia (Semi-final)
Score	Country
12 points	Finland
10 points	Russia
8 points	Lithuania
7 points	Sweden
6 points	Ireland
5 points	Iceland
4 points	Ukraine
3 points	Belgium
2 points	Monaco
1 point	Bosnia and Herzegovina

Points awarded by Estonia (Final)
Score	Country
12 points	Finland
10 points	Russia
8 points	Lithuania
7 points	Sweden
6 points	Ireland
5 points	Ukraine
4 points	Romania
3 points	Latvia
2 points	United Kingdom
1 point	Denmark
