= Mari-Leen =

Estonian singer

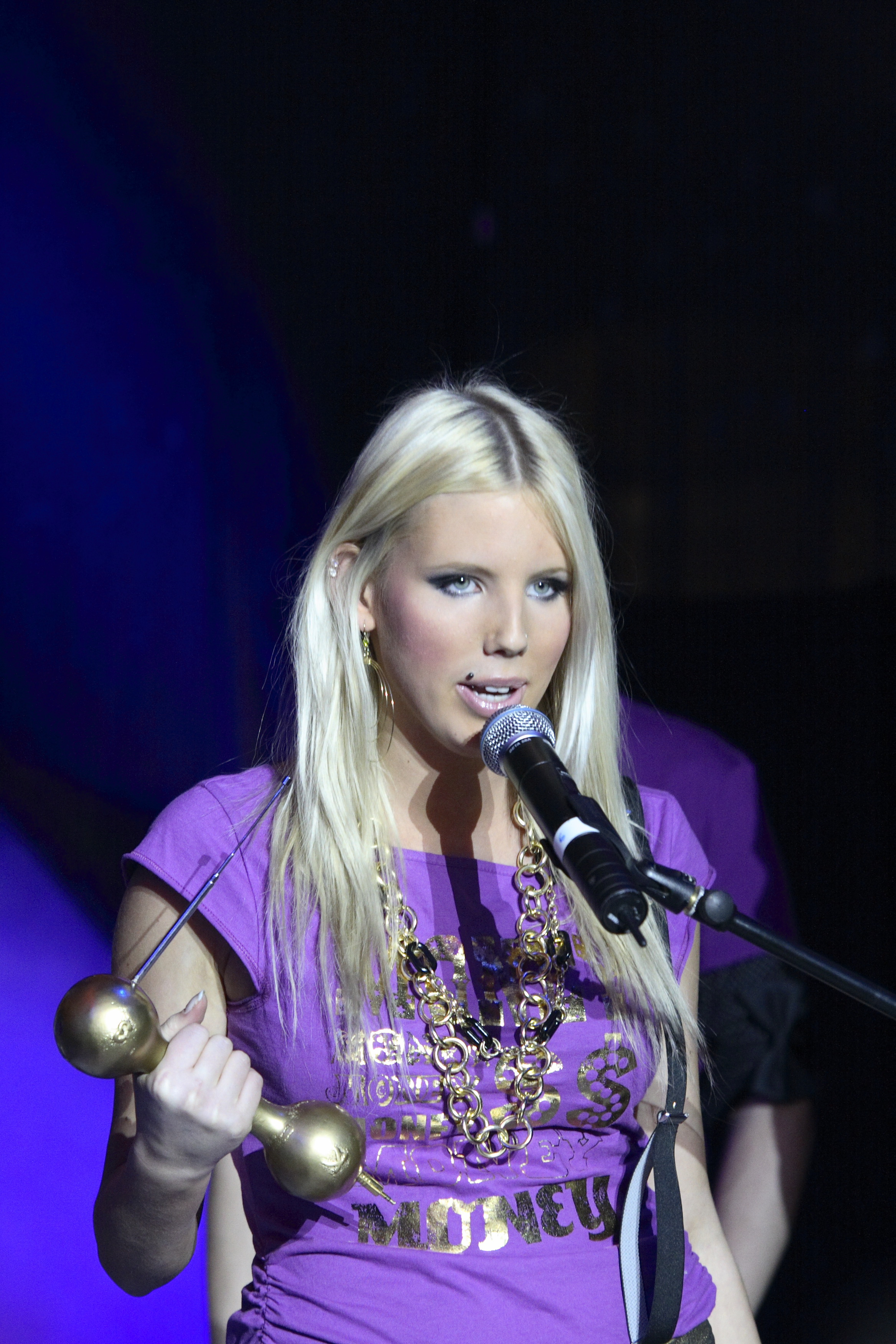
- Mari-Leen in 2007

Background information
- Born: Mari-Leen Kaselaan; 2 December 1987 (age 38); Tartu, then part of Estonian SSR, Soviet Union
- Genres: Pop; pop rock
- Years active: 2005–2011, 2023–present
- Label: Moonwalk
- Website: mari-leen.com

Mari-Leen Kaselaan (also known by stage name Mari-Leen) is an Estonian pop artist. She was born on 2 December 1987 in Tartu, Estonia. She graduated from Elva Music School where she played violin and has studied at the Elva Song Studio and Ülenurme Music School under Ursel Oja.

Her musical career began as part of the group Ekvivalent, but her breakthrough came thanks to a competition run by the Estonian radio station Skyplus, in which Mari-Leen reached the final. However, she became known among the Estonian public as member of the girl band Suntribe. With Suntribe she represented Estonia at the Eurovision Song Contest 2005 with the song "Let´s Get Loud".

Mari-Leen started her solo career with a cover of the Finnish hit Levoton Tuhkimo by Dingo, titled "Rahutu Tuhkatriinu'". After the first single made it to the first place of the Estonian charts, Mari-Leen again topped the Estonian charts with her first solo-album Rahutu Tuhkatriinu, produced and written by Sven Lõhmus, in December 2006.

In December 2011 Mari-Leen stated tiredness of her singing career and therefore decided to give it a pause.

Mari-Leen's new single called "Kiirendus" was released in 2023. She has set a goal to start singing, compose songs, and to give concerts again.

== Awards ==
- Radio 2 Aastahitt 2006 "Best Newcomer"
- Estonian Music Awards 2006 "Best New Act"
- Kuldne Plaat 2007 "Best Female Artist"
- Kuldne Plaat 2007 "Best New Act"

== Eurolaul record ==
- Eurolaul 2005
  - 1st, "Let's Get Loud" (as member of the girl band Suntribe)

== Discography (albums) ==
- Rahutu Tuhkatriinu (2006)
- 1987 (2008)

== Discography (singles) ==
- "Rahutu Tuhkatriinu" (2006)
- "Suure Linna Inglid" (2006)
- "Kiirteel" (2007)
- "Õpetaja" (2007)
- "13 Ja Reede" (2007)
- "Printsess" (2008)
- "1987" (2008)
- "Elektrisinises" (2008)
- "Torm" (2009)
- "Kiirendus" (2023)
- "Viimane suvi" (2024)
