= Avinurme =

Borough in Estonia

- Small borough
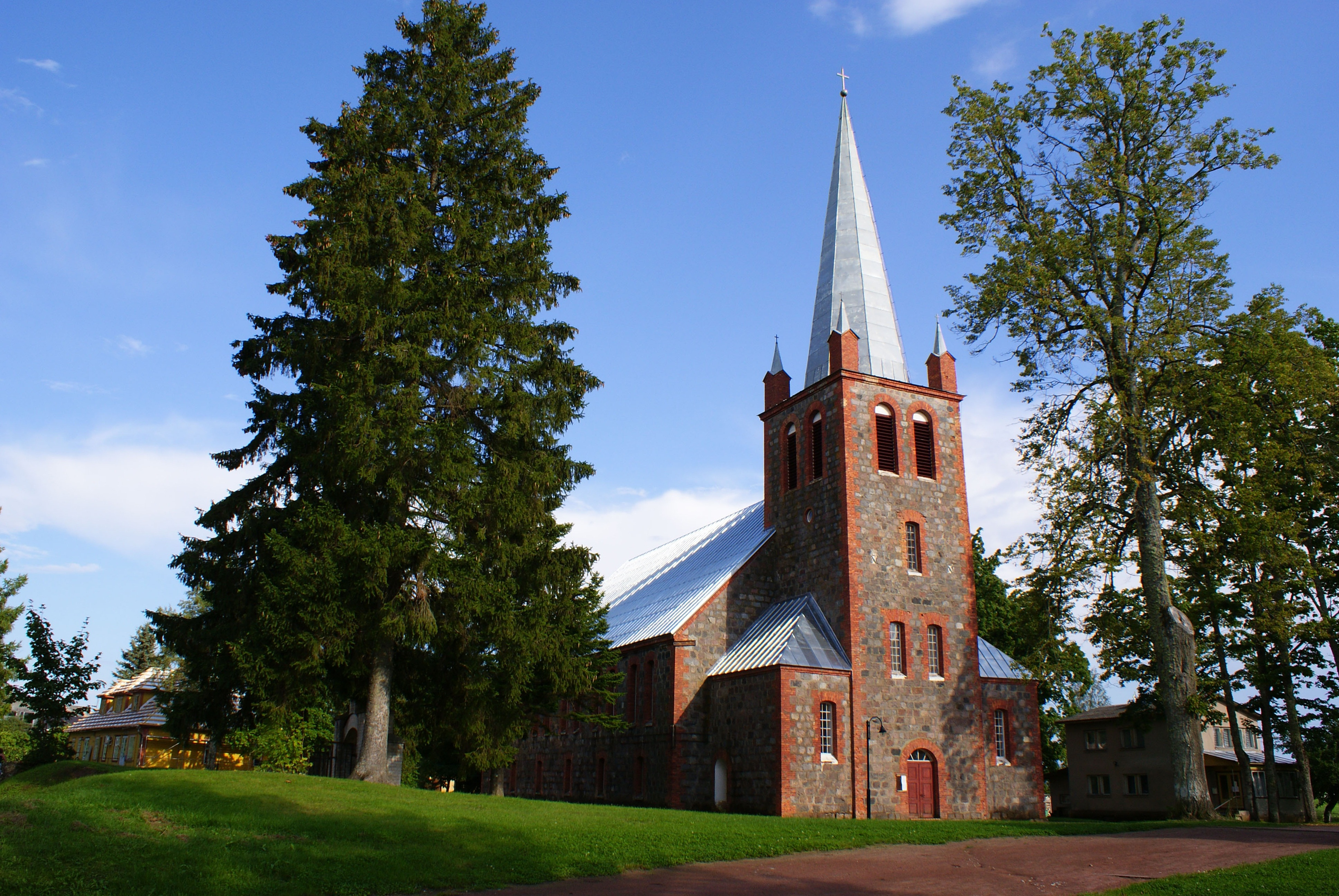
- Avinurme church
- Interactive map of Avinurme
- Coordinates: 58°59′07″N 26°51′45″E
- Country: Estonia
- County: Jõgeva County
- Parish: Mustvee Parish
- Time zone: UTC+2 (EET)
  - Summer (DST): UTC+3 (EEST)

Avinurme (German: Awwinorm) is a small borough (alevik) in Mustvee Parish, Jõgeva County, in northeastern Estonia. It was the administrative centre of Avinurme Parish.

Singer Dagmar Oja was born in Avinurme in 1981.
