= List of Estonian television programs =

This is the list of television programmes broadcast in Estonia. The list is incomplete.

| Name | Channel which broadcast | Year(s) | Further info |
|---|---|---|---|
| Aktuaalne kaamera | | | |
| Ärapanija | Kanal 2 | 2003–2014 | Hosted by Mart Juur and Peeter Oja |
| Brigaad 3 | | | |
| Buratino tegutseb jälle | | 2000s | |
| Eesti otsib superstaari | TV3 | | |
| Eesti Laul | ETV | 2009- | National final to choose the represantetive for the Eurovision Song Contest |
| ENSV | | 2010-2019 | |
| Fizz Superstar | TV3 | 2002 | Music competition between singers from Baltic states. Winner: Kerli Kõiv |
| Hommik Anuga | | | Hosted by Anu Välba |
| Jupiter | | 1970–1991 | |
| Kahvel | | | |
| Kaks takti ette | | | |
| Kättemaksukontor | | | |
| Kelgukoerad | | | |
| Klaver tuleb külla | | | concert tours by Rein Rannap |
| Kodu keset linna | | | |
| Kõige suurem sõber | | | |
| Kuldvillak | Kanal 2 | | |
| M Klubi | TV3 and ETV | | Directed by Roman Baskin |
| Mõtleme veel | ETV | 1987–1989 | |
| Ohtlik lend | | | Crime television series |
| Õnne 13 | | | |
| Onu Raivo Jutupliiats | | | Hosted by Raivo Järvi |
| Osoon | | | |
| Pealtnägija | | | |
| Reporter | | | |
| Ringvaade | ETV | 2009- | TV presenters: Grete Lõbu, Marko Reikop |
| Saladused | | | |
| Terevisioon | | | |
| Tujurikkuja | | | |
| Wigla show | | | |
| Wremja | Kanal 2 | | |

== See also ==
- List of Estonian radio programs
