= Hannes Võrno =

Estonian comedian, politician and military officer

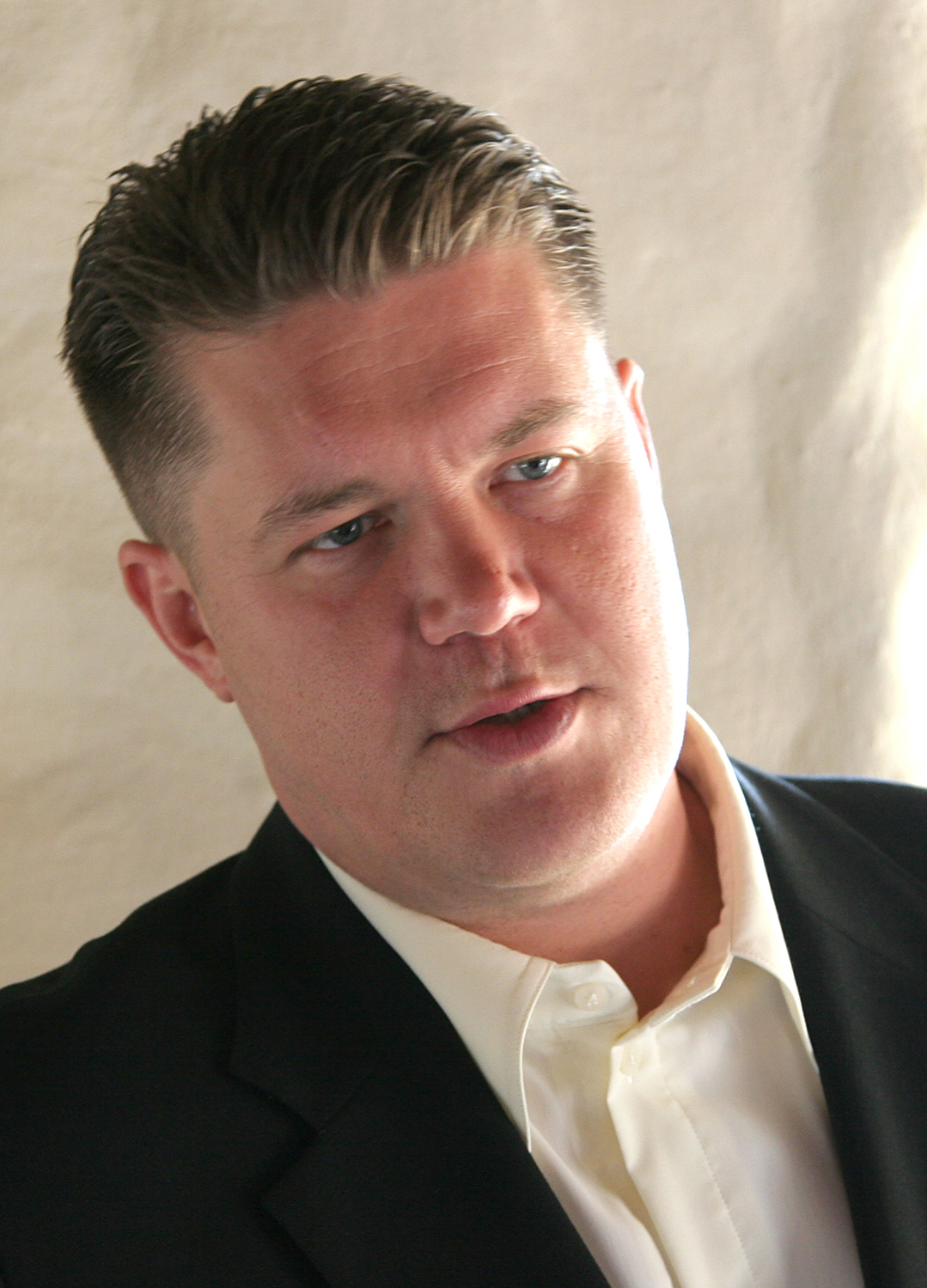
- Hannes Võrno in 2007
- Born: 1 May 1969 (age 57); Rakvere, then part of Estonian SSR, Soviet Union
- Citizenship: Estonian
- Occupations: Comedian, Politician

Hannes Võrno (born 1 May 1969, Rakvere) is a former Estonian comedian, politician and military officer.

To the general public, Võrno is mainly known as a member of the comedy troupe Kreisiraadio, as well as the co-host of the TV show Kahvel and host of TV shows Kes tahab saada miljonäriks? (franchise of Who Wants to Be a Millionaire?) and Tõehetk (franchise of Nada más que la verdad).

== Politics ==
Võrno is a member of the Isamaa ja Res Publica Liit political party. He was a member of Riigikogu, Estonia's parliament, in 2003, but resigned to work as TV host.
