= Raivo Järvi =

Estonian artist, radio personality, and politician

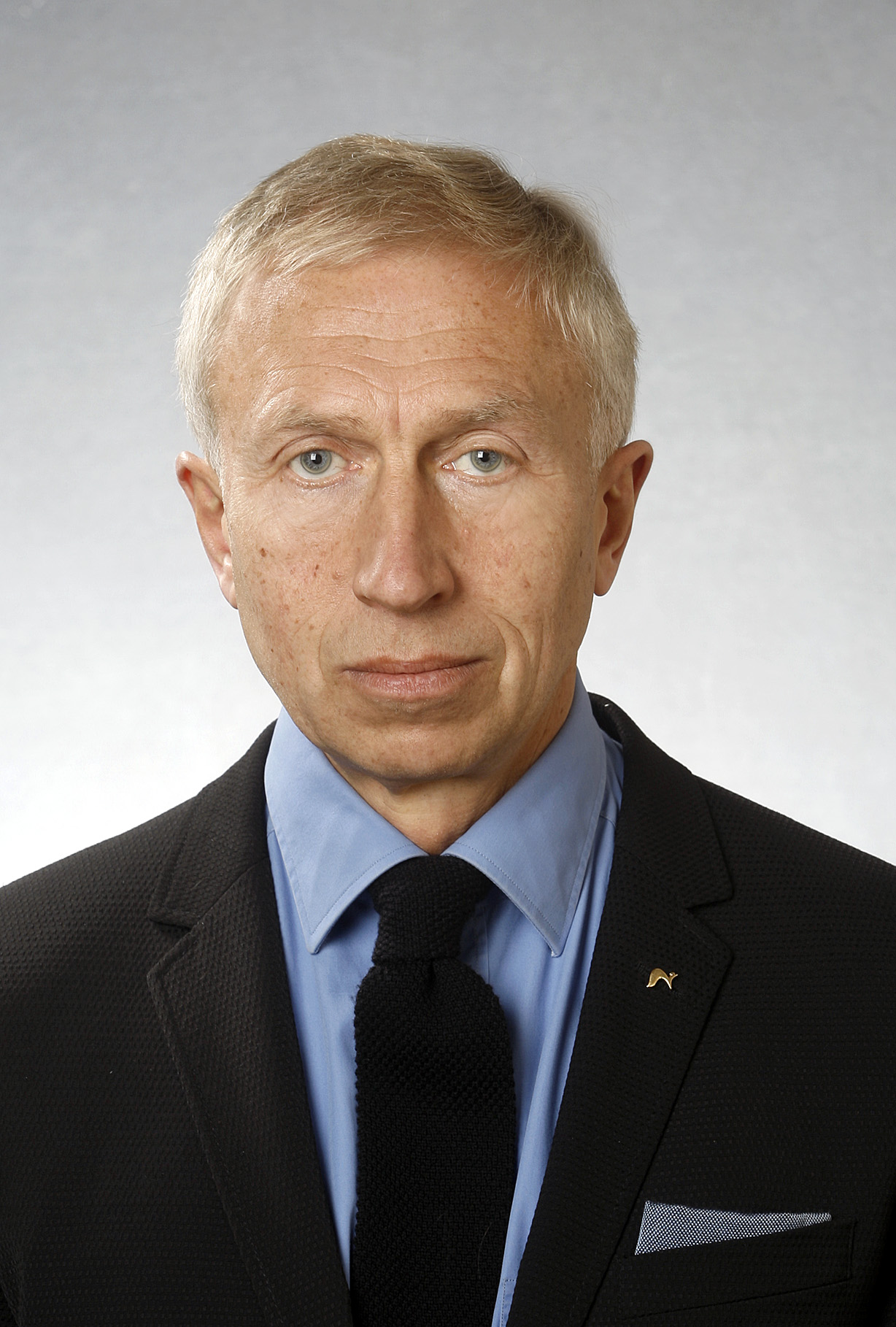
Raivo Järvi (2011)

Raivo Järvi (23 December 1954 – 17 June 2012), commonly known under the pseudonym of Onu Raivo (Uncle Raivo) was an Estonian artist, radio personality and politician.

== Early life and education ==
Järvi was born in Pärnu. His mother was Polish-born ballerina Svetlana Järvi. His father was musician Riho Järvi. In 1979, Järvi graduated from the Estonian Academy of Arts with a degree in graphic design.

While in school, he danced as part of a variety show hosted by his mother at the Astoria restaurant in Tallinn.

== Artistic career ==
Järvi was a freelance artist from 1983 until 2003. He illustrated more than 22 books and wrote and illustrated a children's book.

== Mass media career ==
Järvi appeared in a number of TV shows and radio programmes, most famously in Kõige Suurem Sõber and Onu Raivo Jutupliiats. He also appeared regularly on Radio Kuku with his show Onu Raivo rännakud.

== Political career ==
Järvi joined the Moderate People's Party but failed to be elected in 1999 and 2002. Following this, he joined the Estonian Reform Party in 2002 and was elected as a member of Riigikogu in 2003 and 2007.

He became a substitute member in 2011, replacing the Minister of Foreign Affairs Urmas Paet.

== Personal life and death ==
Järvi was married to Estonian ballerina Tatjana Järvi and had a child from a previous marriage.

He died on 17 June 2012 after a brief illness.

== Awards ==
2001 Medal of The Order of the White Star

== See also ==
- List of Estonians
