= Kes tahab saada miljonäriks? =

Estonian television series

- Created by: David Briggs; Steve Knight; Mike Whitehill
- Presented by: Hannes Võrno
- Country of origin: Estonia

Production
- Running time: 70 minutes

Original release
- Network: TV3
- Release: 8 September 2002 – 3 December 2008

Fragment of the show; Fastest Finger First in progress

Kes tahab saada miljonäriks? (English translation: Who wants to become a millionaire?) is an Estonian quiz show based on the original British format of Who Wants to Be a Millionaire?. The show was hosted by Hannes Võrno and ran for six seasons, from 2002 to 2008. The main goal of the game was to win 1 million EEK (€63,912) by answering 15 multiple-choice questions correctly. There were 3 lifelines - "fifty fifty", "phone a friend" and "ask the audience". The final season introduced the Three Wise Men lifeline from the second milestone. The game show was shown on the TV3. When a contestant got the fifth question correct, they would leave with at least 1,000 EEK. When a contestant got the tenth question correct, they would leave with at least 32,000 EEK.

== Payout structure ==
Question number	Question value (in EEK)
Question number	(Yellow zones are the guaranteed levels)
1	100 (€6)
2	200 (€13)
3	300 (€19)
4	500 (€32)
5	1,000 (€64)
6	2,000 (€128)
7	4,000 (€256)
8	8,000 (€511)
9	16,000 (€1,023)
10	32,000 (€2,045)
11	64,000 (€4,090)
12	125,000 (€7,989)
13	250,000 (€15,978)
14	500,000 (€31,956)
15	1,000,000 (€63,912)

== Big winners ==
- Jevgeni Nurmla - 500 000 EEK (14 March 2004)
- Indrek Salis - 500 000 EEK (6 March 2005)
- Klaarika Park - 250 000 EEK (16 March 2003)
- Rein Õue - 250 000 EEK (February 2004)
- Marek Reinaas - 250 000 EEK (December 2004) (Special edition)
- Mati and Artur Talvik - 250 000 EEK (8 May 2005) (Special edition)
- Lia Hanso - 250 000 EEK (20 January 2008)
- Priit Luhtaru and Triine Puppart - 250 000 EEK (17 February 2008)(Special edition)
