= Heino Seljamaa =

Estonian actor and singer (born 1952)

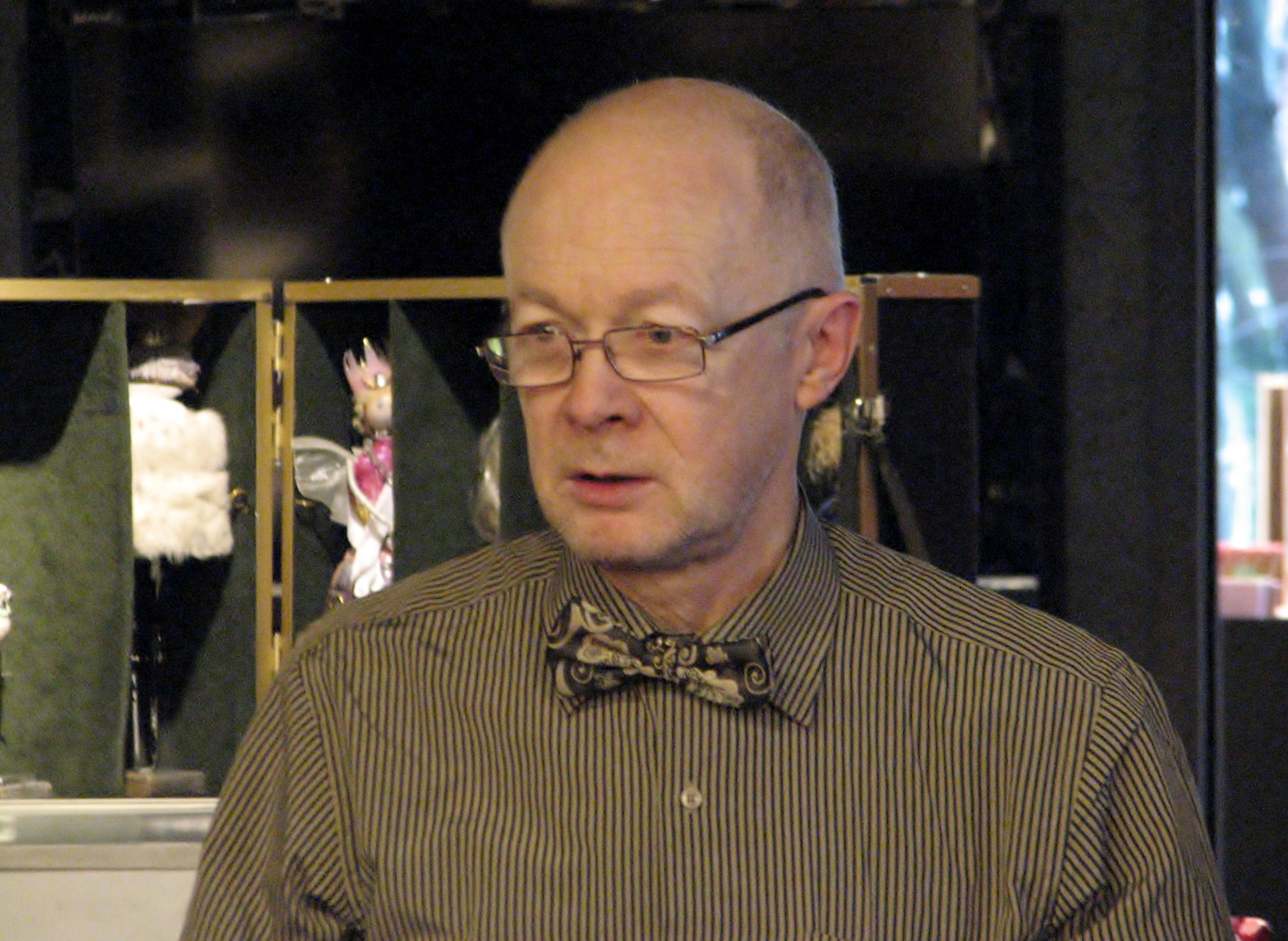
Seljamaa in 2014

Heino Seljamaa (born 21 April 1952 in Türi) is an Estonian actor.

In 1978 he graduated from Tallinn State Conservatory Stage Art Department. 1978–1996 he worked at NUKU Theatre, 1996–1997 at Ugala Theatre and 1997–1998 at Rakvere Theatre. Since 1998 he is a freelance actor. Besides stage roles he has also acted in films and television series, including children's television series. He has also been a member of several music groups, eg Andromeeda (1970) and Kontor (1981–1985).

== Filmography ==
- 1981–1995: Kõige suurem sõber (children's television series)
- 1981: "Kaks päeva Viktor Kingissepa elust I jagu"
- 1982: "Arabella, mereröövli tütar"
- 1982: "Šlaager"
- 2010: "Lumekuninganna" (feature film; in the role: Jasper's father)
- 2020: "Erna on sõjas"
