= Go Live 2005 =

Live album

Live album by Terminaator
- Released: 2005
- Recorded: 3 September 2005
- Genre: Rock
- Label: MFM Records

Terminaator chronology
Kuutõbine (2003)	Go Live 2005 (2005)	Nagu esimene kord (2006)

Go Live 2005 is the ninth album by Estonian rock band Terminaator, released in 2005. It's a live album with songs from the concert "Tele2 Go Live 2005", where other Estonian artists also performed: Genialistid, Cool D, DJ Critikal, Ines, Tanel Padar & The Sun, Toe Tag, Blacky, Smilers, Slobodan River. The cover features the mascot of Terminaator.

== Content ==
The release features a CD and a DVD.

=== CD ===
The CD has all the songs in a row.

=== DVD ===
The DVD features the video of the concert, also commentaries for each song; plus backstage footage.

== Track listing ==
1. "Saatus"
2. "Isa ütles"
3. "Torm"
4. "Romula"
5. "Tänapäeva muinaslugu"
6. "See ei ole saladus"
7. "Ebaõiglane"
8. "Lõbus maja"
9. "Ainult sina võid mu maailma muuta"
10. "Aja teenija"
11. "Muinasjutu mets"
12. "Carmen"
13. "Juulikuu lumi"

Terminaator - Go Live 2005

== Song information ==
- From Lõputu päev: tracks 3, 9
- From Minu väike paradiis: tracks 1, 2, 8, 13
- From Pühertoonia: track 11
- From Singapur: track 10
- From Head uudised: track 6
- From Risk: track 5
- From Kuutõbine: tracks 4, 12
- From the upcoming Nagu esimene kord: track 7
