= Laura Põldvere =

Estonian musician (born 1988)

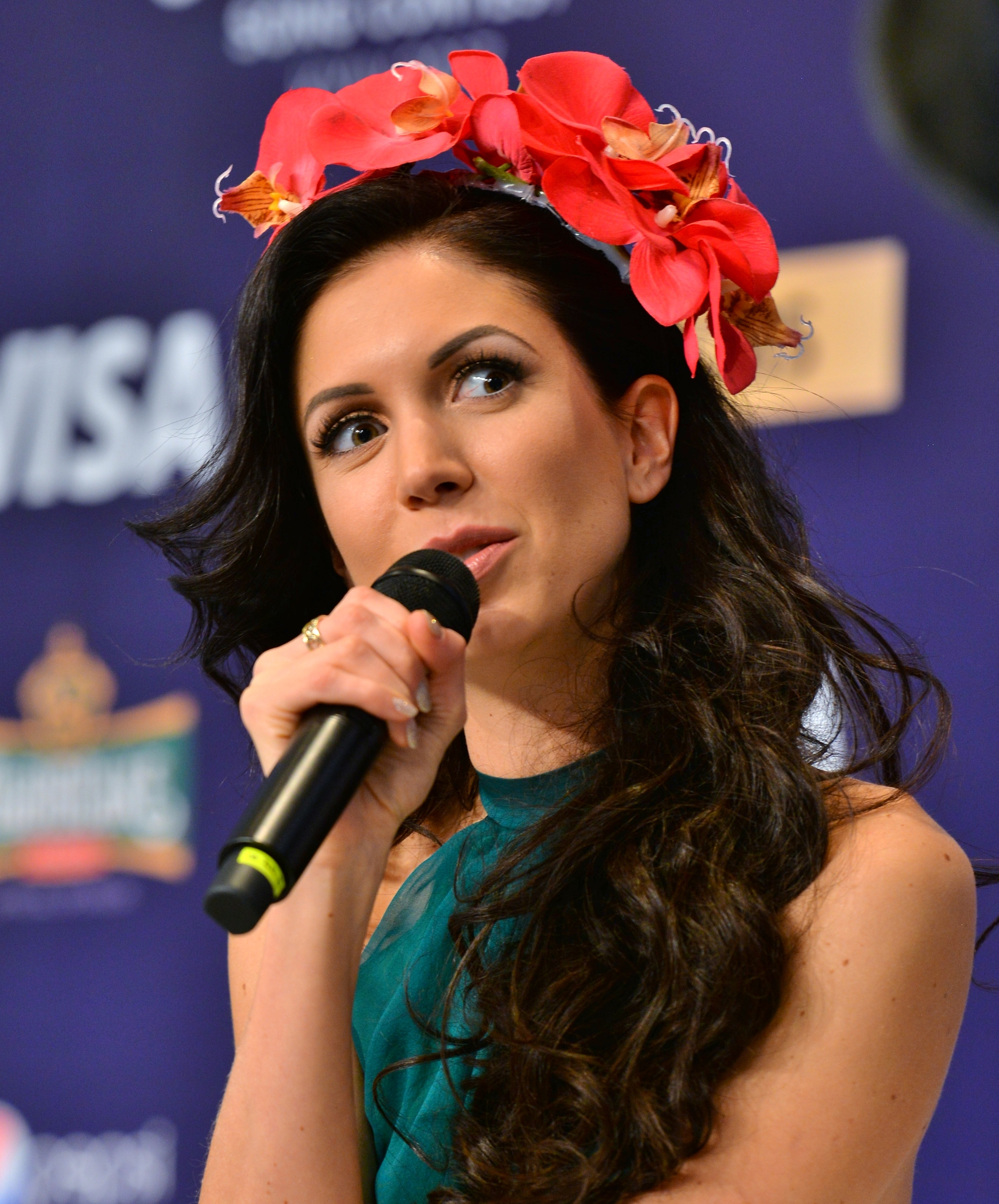
- Laura at Eurovision 2017 in Kyiv
- Born: 30 August 1988 (age 37); Ülenurme, Tartu County, then part of Estonian SSR, Soviet Union
- Other names: Laura; Laura Remmel
- Occupation: Singer
- Years active: 2005–present
- Spouse: Joel-Rasmus Remmel (m. 2013; div. 2016)
- Musical career
- Genres: Pop; dance-pop; jazz; blues
- Instrument: Vocals
- Label: Moonwalk
- Website: www.lauraofficial.com

Laura Põldvere (formerly Remmel; born 30 August 1988 in Ülenurme) sometimes known professionally as simply Laura, is an Estonian singer. She is said to be the most played Estonian artist on Estonian radio in the past decade. She is internationally known for representing Estonia in the Eurovision Song Contest 2005 as part of the girl group Suntribe and did so again in 2017 in a duet with Koit Toome, singing "Verona."

== Career ==
Laura started her career in 2005, when she participated in Eurolaul 2005 with the song "Moonwalk". "Moonwalk" came second, but Laura won the contest as the member of the girl group Suntribe. Suntribe represented Estonia in the Eurovision Song Contest 2005, but failed to advance to the final.

Laura also took part in Eurolaul 2007 for the Eurovision Song Contest 2007, her entry "Sunflowers" came third.

In September 2007, Laura released her debut album "Muusa" and started studies in Berklee College, Boston, putting her music career on hold.

In 2009, she returned to Eesti Laul as a solo singer in hopes of representing Estonia in the Eurovision Song Contest 2009. Her entry "Destiny" came third. The same year, she released her album "Ultra".

In November 2011, Laura released her first compilation album "Sädemeid taevast", which consisted of all her singles since 2005 to 2011 as well as a track from her second studio album "Ultra".

Laura once again competed to represent Estonia in the Eurovision Song Contest 2016, entering Eesti Laul with the song "Supersonic". It placed second in the superfinal.

In Eesti Laul 2017 she competed in a duet with Koit Toome with the song "Verona" and won. They thereafter represented Estonia in the Eurovision Song Contest 2017 in Kyiv, Ukraine. Despite being fan favourites, the duo failed to advance to the Grand Final after placing 14th in their semi-final, a blended result of 6th place from the Televoting and 17th from the Juries voting. They had been predicted as likely qualifiers beforehand, ranked 5th in the second Semi-Final by betting odds and 5th by OGAE voting overall.

Laura again competed to represent Estonia at Eurovision in Eesti Laul 2020 with her song "Break Me". Reaching the final, she finished 11th out of 12 entries.

In January 2021, it was revealed that Laura would attempt to represent Finland at Eurovision in Uuden Musiikin Kilpailu 2021 with her song "Play". She finished last in the selection with 13 points out of 7 competing artists.

In November 2023, she was announced as one of the semi-finalists of Eesti Laul 2024, with the song "Here's Where I Draw the Line". She did not qualify from the semi-final.

== Personal life ==
Laura was married to pianist Joel-Rasmus Remmel in 2013. They divorced in 2016.

Her younger brother Gregor died in 2016.

Põldvere moved to Finland in 2019, and she works in Espoo.

== Discography ==
=== Albums ===
Title	Details
Muusa	Released: 1 September 2007; Format: Digital download; Label: Moonwalk
Ultra	Released: 8 December 2009; Format: Digital download; Label: Moonwalk
Crazy enough (with Villu Veski, as Laura & W)	Released: 31 March 2018; Format: Digital download
9 Elu	Released: 3 December 2019; Format: Digital download; Label: Oh! Joy productions

=== Compilation albums ===
Title	Details
Sädemeid taevast	Released: November 2011; Format: Digital download; Label: Moonwalk
Greatest Hits	Released: 12 May 2017; Format: Digital download; Label: Moonwalk

=== Singles ===
Title	Year	Peak chart positions	Album
Title	Year	EST	Album
"Moonwalk"	2005	1	Muusa
"Sunflowers"	2007	1	Muusa
"Muusa"	2007	—	Muusa
"581c"	2008	—	Muusa
"Lihtsad asjad" (feat. Raivo Tafenau)	2008	—	Muusa
"Destiny"	2009	—	Ultra
"Pühakud"	2009	—	Ultra
"Ultra"	2009	—	Ultra
"Südasuve Rohtunud Teed"	2010	—	Ultra
"Võid Kindel Olla"	2010	—	Sädemeid taevast
"Kustuta Kuuvalgus"	2011	—	Ultra
"2020"	2011	—	Sädemeid Taevast
"Sädemeid Taevast"	2012	—	Sädemeid Taevast
"Supersonic"	2016	1	Greatest Hits
"94-95"	2016	1	Greatest Hits
"Verona" (with Koit Toome)	2017	2	Greatest Hits
"Verona (Italian version)" (with Koit Toome)	2017	—	Greatest Hits
"Waterfall"	2017	—	Non-album singles
"Tõusulained"	2018	—	Non-album singles
"Lennujaamas"	2019	—	Non-album singles
"Keerleme"	2019	—	9 Elu
"Don´t Shut Me Out"	2019	—	9 Elu
"Segamini Maailm" (with Koit Toome)	2019	—	9 Elu
"Break Me"	2019	—	9 Elu
"On Meie Aeg"	2019	—	9 Elu
"Play"	2021	—	Non-album single
"Here´s Where I Draw the Line"	2023	—	Non-album single
"—" denotes a recording that did not chart or was not released in that territory.

Awards and achievements
Preceded by Neiokõsõ with "Tii"	Estonia in the Eurovision Song Contest (as part of Suntribe); 2005	Succeeded by Sandra Oxenryd with "Through My Window"
Preceded by Jüri Pootsmann with "Play"	Estonia in the Eurovision Song Contest (with Koit Toome); 2017	Succeeded by Elina Nechayeva with "La forza"
