= Anu Välba =

Estonian television and radio host

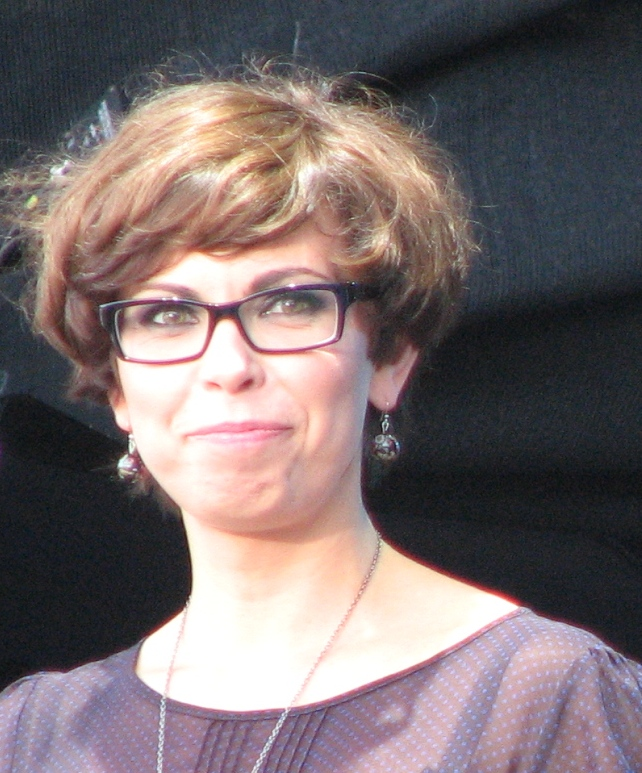
Anu Välba in 2011

Anu Välba (born 14 May 1974) is an Estonian TV and radio host.

She graduated from Tallinn University in television directing in 1998 but has been working as a hostess instead. Her credits include the TV morning programme "Terevisioon", weekly "Paar", "Hommik Anuga" and daily "Ringvaade", all but one co-hosted with Marko Reikop. She was also involved with Eurovision Song Contest 2002 where she did off-screen editing for video postcards shown between the competing songs.

On the radio, she has co-worked for the programmes of Vikerraadio and Raadio 2.
