= Romeo & Julia =

2006 album by Terminaator

Soundtrack album by Various Artists
- Released: 2006
- Recorded: Rockhouse Studio; by Elmar Liitmaa and Ergo Ehte
- Genre: Musical
- Label: Sam Raimi

Romeo & Julia is the official soundtrack for Terminaator's musical "Romeo & Julia" (Romeo and Juliet), made for Eesti Nuku- ja Noorsooteater (Estonian Puppet and Youth Theatre). Unlike the soundtrack for "Risk", this one wasn't released under the name of Terminaator.

Later, a new song was written for Hele Kõre and Kristjan Kasearu, titled "Romeo ja Julia". It was written for the Eurovision Song Contest 2007, and was also added in the play and released as a single, but it's absent from the earlier released soundtrack.

== Track listing ==
1. Jaagup Kreem/choir - Rikkad vaesed [Rich people poor people] (E. Liitmaa/J. Kreem) - 3:45
2. Kristjan Kasearu, Taavi Tõnisson/choir - Oh armastus [Oh love] (E. Liitmaa/J. Kreem) - 2:49
3. Kristjan Kasearu/choir - Pilveräbalad [ Cloudshreds] (E. Liitmaa/J. Kreem) - 3:25
4. Hele Kõre - Arm on hukatus (1) [Love is doom] (E. Liitmaa/J. Kreem) - 2:30
5. Tõnu Kilgas/choir - Ljubov, amore, love või armastus ["või" means "or", other 4 words are "love" in different languages: Russian, Italian, English and Estonian] (E. Liitmaa/J. Kreem) - 3:10
6. Kristjan Kasearu/choir - Nagu esimene kord [Like on the first time] (E. Liitmaa/J. Kreem) - 2:55
7. Hele Kõre, Kristjan Kasearu - Siis, kui maailm magab veel [When the world is still sleeping] (E. Liitmaa/J. Kreem) - 4:41
8. Kaire Vilgats, Jaagup Kreem, Taavi Tõnisson/choir - Külakoerad [ Village dogs] (E. Liitmaa/J. Kreem) - 1:42
9. Kaire Vilgats - Mõrkjad pisarad [Bitter tears] (E. Liitmaa/J. Kreem) - 3:09
10. Jaagup Kreem, Kristjan Kasearu - Sõbrad nii ei tee [ Friends don't do that] (J. Kreem) - 2:24
11. Tõnis Mägi - Tee seda veel [Do that again] (E. Liitmaa/J. Kreem) - 3:52
12. Liisi Koikson - Arm on hukatus (2) (E. Liitmaa/J. Kreem) - 2:19
13. Jaagup Kreem/choir - Pankuri tütar ja töölise poeg [Banker's daughter and laborer's son] (E. Liitmaa/J. Kreem) - 5:08
14. Kristjan Kasearu/choir - "Head ööd [Good night] (E. Liitmaa/J. Kreem) - 4:21
15. Kaire Vilgats, Jaagup Kreem/choir - Surmav vaen [Deadly dander] (E. Liitmaa/J. Kreem) - 3:49
16. Kaire Vilgats - Tee seda veel - 2:56

== Song information ==
- Tracks 4 and 12 are different versions of one song, also with different artists.
- Tracks 11 and 16 have the same lyrics but are performed by different artists.
- Tracks 6, 13 and 14 are also found on Terminaator's album "Nagu esimene kord" (there performed by Terminaator).

=== Choir ===
Andres Dvinjaninov (1, 15)
Rasmus Erismaa (1, 3, 6, 8, 15)
Jelena Juzvik (15)
Harmo Kallaste (13)
Kristjan Kasearu (1, 3, 6)
Henno Kelp (13)
Jaagup Kreem (13)
Hele Kõre (2, 15)
Elmar Liitmaa (13, 14)
Anneli Pilpak (8, 15)
Mart-Rasmus Puur (8, 15)
Kristo Rajasaare (8)
Taavi Tõnisson (1, 3, 6, 15)
Kaire Vilgats (1, 2, 3, 5, 6)
Taavi Üprus (8)

== Singles ==
- 2006: Pilveräbalad
- 2006: Siis, kui maailm magab veel
- 2006: Head ööd
