= Singapur (album) =

1998 album by Terminaator

Studio album by Terminaator
- Released: 1998
- Recorded: 1998, at Seaside Studio, by Rene Liitmaa
- Genre: Rock
- Length: 46:53
- Label: MFM Records

Terminaator chronology
Kuld (1997/2003)	Singapur (1998)	Head uudised (2000)

Singapur (Singapore) is the fifth album by Estonian rock band Terminaator. It was released in 1998.

== Track listing ==
1. Aja teenija [The recruit, lit: time servant] (J.Hakulinen/J.Kreem) - 5:25
2. Singapuri Lu [Lu of Singapore] (J.Kreem/J.Kreem) - 3:44
3. Sinu juurde tagasi [Back to you] (J.Kreem/J.Kreem) - 4:08
4. Baarman teab [Barman knows] (J.Kreem/J.Kreem) - 3:35
5. Maanteepõletaja [Highway burner] (J.Kreem/J.Kreem) - 4:05
6. Surmav suudlus [Deadly kiss] (E.Kaljulaid/J.Kreem) - 2:41
7. Haige maailm [Sick world] (J.Kreem/Sulliwan/J.Kreem) - 3:04
8. Alatud valed [Vile lies] (E.Kaljulaid/J.Kreem) - 5:13
9. Preeriatuul [Prairie wind] (J.Kreem/J.Kreem) - 5:41
10. Nr 666 [No 666] (J.Kreem/J.Kreem) - 3:08
11. Koera elu (Tsau beibe) [Dog's life (Ciao baby)] (Terminaator/J.Kreem) - 2:49
12. Televiisorimees [Televisor man] (J.Kreem/J.Kreem) - 2:40

== Song information ==
- "Aja teenija" is about not wanting to go to the army, also portraying it as being awful in every way. The song starts out with a speech performed by Väino Laes. It's the only song from this album to be featured on "Go Live 2005". Aja teenija is an Estonian version of Finnish Jussi Hakulinen's song Armeijan syvin olemus from his album Vaaleanpunainen majatalo (1985).
- Singapuri Lu is a fortuneteller, who always predicts bad things.
- "Sinu juurde tagasi" about missing somebody and thus having negative feelings.
- "Baarman teab" is about lowlifes spending nights in bars and contemplating about life.
- "Maanteepõletaja" is an ode to living to ride and riding to live.
- "Surmav suudlus" is a love song.
- "Haige maailm" is person- or society-critical.
- "Alatud valed" is about falseness, hypocrisy and self-admiring.
- "Preeriatuul" tells a story about an Indian, to whom an old chief foretells his death.
- "Nr 666" is about a gambler, who is a cheater.
- "Koera elu" is about a dog, whose girlfriend is not worth him ("ciao" as "bye", not as "hi").
- "Televiisorimees" is about a man, who watches too much TV and cuts himself off from everything else and whose life is led by TV. A live version is on "Head uudised".

== Personnel ==
- Jaagup Kreem - vocals, 12-strings
- Sulev "Sulliwan" Müürsepp - guitar, harmonica, organ, flute, piano, vocals
- Sven Valdmann - bass
- Margus Valk - guitar
- Eimel Kaljulaid - drum, synth, vocals
- Rene Liitmaa - sound, technical supervisor
