= Peeter Oja =

Estonian actor, singer, comedian and media personality

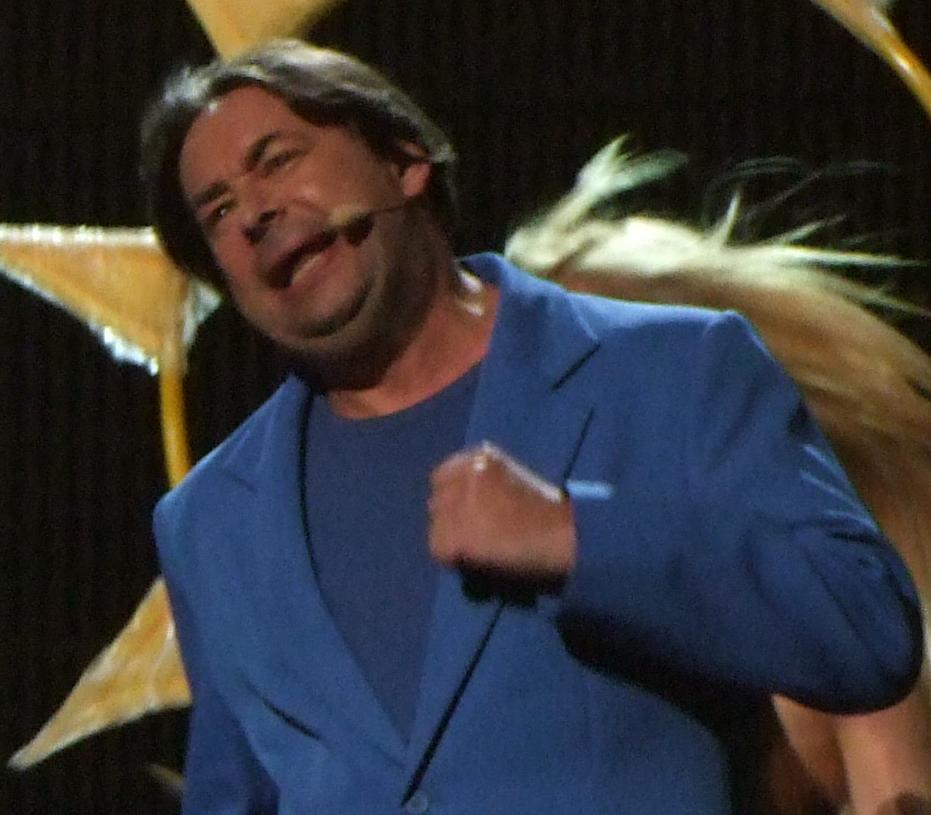
- Peeter Oja in 2008
- Born: 2 July 1960 (age 65); Tallinn, then part of Estonian SSR, Soviet Union
- Citizenship: Estonian
- Occupations: Comedian, Singer, actor

Peeter Oja (born 2 July 1960 in Tallinn) is an Estonian actor, singer, comedian and media personality.

In 1986 he graduated from the Tallinn State Conservatory Stage Art Department. 1986–1989 he worked at Vanemuine Theatre. 1992–1994 he worked at Estonia Theatre. Since 1994 he is a freelance actor.

He has been a member of several musical groups, including Kuldne Trio and Bläck Rokit.

He has hosted several popular television series, e.g. Kitsas king (1985–1987), the comedy ensemble Kreisiraadio (1997–2003), with whom he appeared as Estonia's entry with at the Eurovision Song Contest 2008, and Ärapanija (2003–2013). Oja has also appeared in a number of prominent roles in feature films.
