= Kõige suurem sõber =

Estonian television series

Kõige Suurem Sõber (Estonian for The Biggest Friend) was a long-running children's TV show on Estonian Television in the early 1980s. It featured a big orange furry creature called Leopold (played by Harry Kõrvits) and a host of other more or less recurring characters, and is for many Estonians a symbol of childhood and/or children's TV.

Unfortunately, most of the magnetic video tapes used for storage of the show have been recycled due to the perestroika-era deficits. However, a small number of the episodes have remained, and are now available from ETV on both VHS and DVD.

== Major characters ==
=== Leopold ===
The main character of the show. Played by Harry Kõrvits in a fursuit.

=== Postikana ===
A chicken serving as a postmaster of the show. Puppeteered by Hendrik Toompere.

=== Onu Raivo ===
Playing himself, a freelance artist. See Raivo Järvi.

=== Äpu ===
A small and shy character living inside one of Leopold's drawers. Puppeteered by Heino Seljamaa.

== Minor recurring characters ==
=== Anekdoot ===
This character lived inside one of Leopold's cupboards, and sometimes told a joke after the main show. He had no other relations to the other characters.

== 2007 parody controversy ==
In early 2007, Ken Saan and others planned to introduce an irreverent parody show "Täna Õhtul Leo Põld" (Tonight Leo Põld) reusing, in grotesque ways, characters of this show. Many people considered this extremely inappropriate, and objected in various ways. Although the first few episodes were produced, the show was withdrawn before broadcasting the pilot episode, scheduled for 15 May 2007, due to death of Dan Põldroos, one of the main actors of the parody.

In response to the controversy, Estonian National Broadcasting, a successor of Estonian Television and Estonian Radio, decided to trademark some of its most well-known characters, including those of Kõige suurem sõber.

Broadcasting of the pilot episode was rescheduled to 6 September 2007 at 22:05, but on 5 September 2007, the Harju County Court issued a temporary injunction against broadcasting until ETV's trademark claims have been tried.

On 29 January 2009, Harju Maakohus dismissed the lawsuit and lifted all related temporary injunctions, ruling that the plaintiff has not proven that the defendant is the show's producer, and therefore, that the appropriate defendant was sued.
