= Suntribe =

Estonian musical group (2005)

- Origin: Estonia
- Genres: Pop
- Years active: 2005
- Label: Moonwalk
- Past members: Mari-Leen Kaselaan; Rebecca Kontus; Laura Põldvere; Jaanika Vilipo; Daana Ots

Suntribe was an Estonian girl group that participated in the 50th Eurovision Song Contest in 2005. The original line-up was Mari-Leen Kaselaan, Rebecca Kontus, Laura Põldvere and Jaanika Vilipo. They were later joined by a fifth member, Daana Ots.

The group won the pre-selection competition, Eurolaul, with their song "Let's Get Loud", which received 10,583 votes and went on to represent Estonia in the Eurovision Song Contest 2005. Estonia performed in twelfth position in the semi-final of the 2005 Contest which was held in Kyiv, Ukraine on 19 May 2005, but failed to qualify for the grand final after finishing in 20th place.

Several members of the band later split to pursue solo careers, with one of the members, Laura Põldvere, returning to the contest in 2017 to represent Estonia with Koit Toome.

== Discography ==
Singles

- 2005: "Ei Tunne Mind"
- 2005: "Let's Get Loud"

Awards and achievements
Preceded by Neiokõsõ with "Tii"	Estonia in the Eurovision Song Contest; 2005	Succeeded by Sandra Oxenryd with "Through My Window"
