= Sandra Oxenryd =

Swedish singer

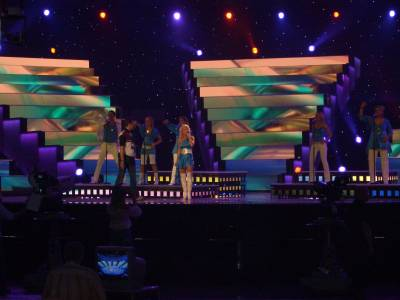
- Sandra Oxenryd rehearsing at the Eurovision Song Contest 2006

Background information
- Born: Sandra Oxenryd; 1 October 1982 (age 43); Kristinehamn, Sweden
- Genres: Pop, dance
- Years active: 2005–present

Sandra Oxenryd (born 1 October 1982) is a Swedish singer who won Fame Factory in 2005, and represented Estonia in the Eurovision Song Contest 2006.

== Biography ==
Oxenryd was born in Kristinehamn and is a former economics student and floorball player. Aged eleven, she started her singing career by performing on national television. At 18, she placed second in a look-alike competition, where she mirrored Swedish superstar Carola Häggkvist. After winning the Swedish Fame Factory in 2005, Sandra recorded her debut album. An international jury decided that Sandra Oxenryd would represent Estonia at Eurovision 2006 with the song Through My Window. The song is written by Pearu Paulus, Ilmar Laisaar, Alar Kotkas (composers) and Jana Hallas (lyricist), the same authors who wrote the Estonian entries for 2000 ("Once in a lifetime") and 2002 ("Runaway"), which came 4th and 3rd, respectively. Despite the song becoming a fan favourite, "Through My Window" only scored 28 points and finished 18th in the semi-final, therefore not qualifying for the final.

On 23 February 2008, Sandra competed for the chance to represent Poland in that year's Eurovision, with the song "Superhero", finishing 8th.

== See also ==
- Estonia in the Eurovision Song Contest 2006
- Eurovision Song Contest 2006
- Poland in the Eurovision Song Contest 2008

Awards and achievements
Preceded by Suntribe with "Let's Get Loud"	Estonia in the Eurovision Song Contest; 2006	Succeeded by Gerli Padar with "Partners in Crime"
