= Tarmo Leinatamm =

Estonian conductor, comedian and politician

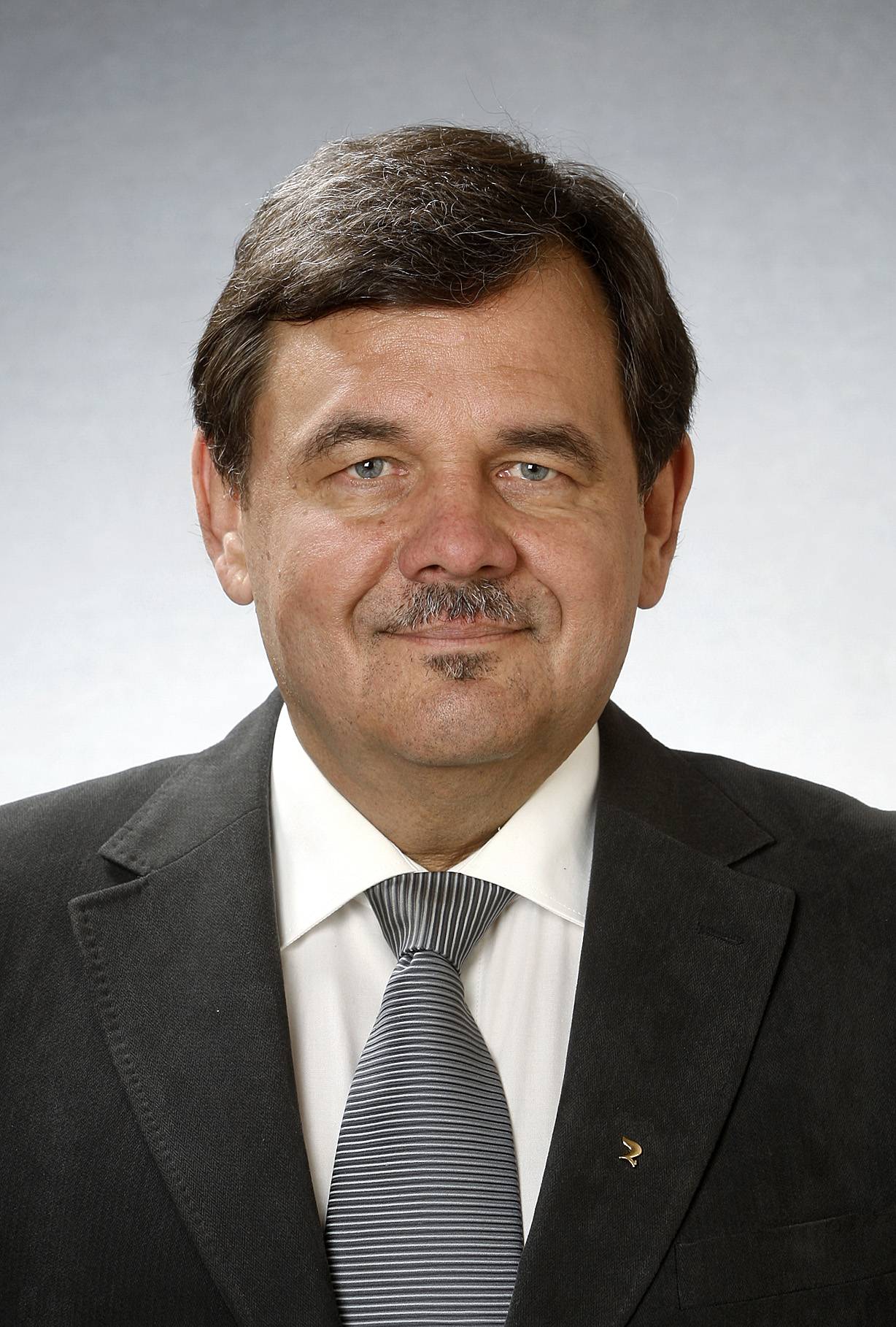
Tarmo Leinatamm

Tarmo Leinatamm (2 September 1957, Keila – 13 October 2014) was an Estonian conductor, comedian and politician. He was a member of X and XII Riigikogu.

== Life and career ==
He graduated from Tallinn State Conservatory.

1991-1994 he was the conductor of Estonian National Opera. 1994-1999 he was the director of Tallinn Philharmonic.

He was a member of Estonian Reform Party.
