= Estonia in the Eurovision Song Contest 2005 =

- Eurovision Song Contest 2005
- Participating broadcaster: Eesti Televisioon (ETV)
- Country: Estonia
- Selection process: Eurolaul 2005
- Selection date: 5 February 2005

Competing entry
- Song: "Let's Get Loud"
- Artist: Suntribe
- Songwriters: Sven Lõhmus

Placement
- Semi-final result: Failed to qualify (20th)

Participation chronology

Estonia was represented at the Eurovision Song Contest 2005 with the song "Let's Get Loud", written by Sven Lõhmus, and performed by the group Suntribe. The Estonian participating broadcaster, Eesti Televisioon (ETV), organised the national final Eurolaul 2005 in order to select its entry for the contest. Nine songs competed in the national final and "Let's Get Loud" performed by Suntribe was selected as the winner entirely by a public vote.

Estonia competed in the semi-final of the Eurovision Song Contest which took place on 19 May 2005. Performing during the show in position 12, "Let's Get Loud" was not announced among the top 10 entries of the semi-final and therefore did not qualify to compete in the final. It was later revealed that Estonia placed twentieth out of the 25 participating countries in the semi-final with 31 points.

== Background ==
Prior to the 2005 Contest, Eesti Televisioon (ETV) had participated in the Eurovision Song Contest representing Estonia ten times since its first entry in 1994, winning the contest on one occasion: in 2001 with the song "Everybody" performed by Tanel Padar, Dave Benton, and 2XL. In 2004, "Tii" performed by Neiokõsõ failed to qualify to the final where the song placed eleventh in the semi-final.

As part of its duties as participating broadcaster, ETV organises the selection of its entry in the Eurovision Song Contest and broadcasts the event in the country. Since its debut, the broadcaster has organised national finals that feature a competition among multiple artists and songs in order to select its entry for the contest. ETV has organised Eurolaul competition since 1996 in order to select its entry, and on 13 October 2004, the broadcaster announced the organisation of Eurolaul 2005 in order to select its 2005 entry.

== Before Eurovision ==
=== Eurolaul 2005 ===
Eurolaul 2005 was the twelfth edition of the national selection Eurolaul, organised by ETV to select its entry for the Eurovision Song Contest 2005. The competition consisted of a ten-song final on 5 February 2005 at the ETV studios in Tallinn, hosted by Marko Reikop and Eda-Ines Etti and broadcast on ETV.

==== Competing entries ====
On 13 October 2004, ETV opened the submission period for artists and composers to submit their entries up until 6 December 2004. All artists and composers were required to have Estonian citizenship or be a permanent resident of Estonia. 92 submissions were received by the deadline, 87 of them which were eligible. A 10-member jury panel selected 10 finalists from the submissions and the selected songs were announced on 9 December 2004. Airi Ojamets and Cardinals have both competed in previous editions of Eurolaul. The selection jury consisted of Jaak Joala (musician), Priit Hõbemägi (culture critic), Meelis Kapstas (journalist), Jaan Elgula (musician), Allan Roosileht (Raadio 2 music editor), Olavi Pihlamägi (journalist), Maarja-Liis Ilus (singer), Hanna-Liina Võsa (singer), Urmas Lattikas (composer) and Jaagup Kreem (musician).

On 15 December 2004, "Set Me as a Seal", written by Bard Eirik Hallesby Norheim and Jo Hegle Sjaeflot and to have been performed by Bard Eirik Hallesby Norheim, was disqualified from the competition due to the song being co-written by a non-Estonian citizen and replaced with the song "Have You Ever" performed by Rebecca Kontus. On 2 February 2005, "Nevermore Island", written by Sven Lõhmus, Mario Kivistik and Margus-Koit Kivistik and to have been performed by Julia Boman was disqualified due to the song having already been published in December 2003.

==== Final ====
The final took place on 5 February 2005. Nine songs competed during the show and "Let's Get Loud" performed by Suntribe was selected as the winner entirely by a public televote which registered 44,409 votes.

Final – 5 February 2005
R/O	Artist	Song	Songwriter(s)	Televote	Place
1	Sobe	"Look in My Eyes"	Meelis Leis, Margus Lattik	219	9
2	Glow	"Break the Ties"	Peeter Kaljuste, Elmar Liitmaa, Marta Piigli, Ketlin Hoe	393	8
3	Airi Ojamets	"Dream in a Dream"	Ivar Männik, Mario Kivistik	6,337	4
4	Deva Deva Dance and Cardinals	"11"	Priit Pajusaar, Glen Pilvre, Aarne Lauri	6,946	3
5	Glow	"Dream"	Raul Veeber, Asko-Rome Altsoo	690	7
6	Rebecca Kontus	"Have You Ever"	Karel Kattai, Urmeli Niit	4,164	6
7	Eha Urbsalu	"Gotta Go"	Priit Pajusaar, Glen Pilvre, Maian Kärmas	5,171	5
8	Laura	"Moonwalk"	Sven Lõhmus	9,906	2
9	Suntribe	"Let's Get Loud"	Sven Lõhmus	10,583	1

== At Eurovision ==
According to Eurovision rules, all nations with the exceptions of the host country, the "Big Four" (France, Germany, Spain and the United Kingdom) and the ten highest placed finishers in the 2004 contest are required to qualify from the semi-final on 19 May 2005 in order to compete for the final on 21 May 2005; the top ten countries from the semi-final progress to the final. On 22 March 2005, an allocation draw was held which determined the running order for the semi-final and Estonia was set to perform in position 12, following the entry from Belgium and before the entry from Norway. On 3 March 2005, Daana Otsa was announced to have joined the group as a fifth member. At the end of the semi-final, Estonia was not announced among the top 10 entries in the semi-final and therefore failed to qualify to compete in the final. It was later revealed that Estonia placed 20th in the semi-final, receiving a total of 31 points.

The semi-final and the final were broadcast in Estonia on ETV with commentary by Marko Reikop. ETV appointed Maarja-Liis Ilus (who represented Estonia in 1996 and in 1997) as its spokesperson to announce the Estonian votes during the final.

=== Voting ===
Below is a breakdown of points awarded to Estonia and awarded by Estonia in the semi-final and grand final of the contest. The nation awarded its 12 points to Switzerland in the semi-final and the final of the contest.

==== Points awarded to Estonia ====
Points awarded to Estonia (Semi-final)
Score	Country
12 points	Latvia
10 points	
8 points	
7 points	
6 points	Finland
5 points	Lithuania
4 points	
3 points	Denmark
2 points	Slovenia
1 point	Hungary; Ireland; Moldova

==== Points awarded by Estonia ====
Points awarded by Estonia (Semi-final)
Score	Country
12 points	Switzerland
10 points	Latvia
8 points	Finland
7 points	Denmark
6 points	Norway
5 points	Moldova
4 points	Hungary
3 points	Croatia
2 points	Ireland
1 point	Romania

Points awarded by Estonia (Final)
Score	Country
12 points	Switzerland
10 points	Latvia
8 points	Norway
7 points	Russia
6 points	Moldova
5 points	Denmark
4 points	Malta
3 points	Hungary
2 points	Croatia
1 point	Israel
