= Smilers =

Estonian musical group

- Also known as: Hendrik Sal-Saller & Smilers; Smilers & Hendrik Sal-Saller
- Origin: Estonia; Finland
- Genres: Rock; Pop rock
- Years active: 1991–present

Smilers is an Estonian rock band formed in 1991 by Hendrik Sal-Saller. The name reportedly originated from a Rod Stewart album, Smiler. The band was first named Lezer Brozers. In the early years Smilers produced two albums in Finland, but as these were not successful, they returned to Estonia and gained fame soon after. Smilers won the Artist of the Year award in the 2004 Estonian Music Awards. Smilers were also awarded a Golden Disc for Song of the Year in 2004 for "Ainult unustamiseks".

== Current members ==
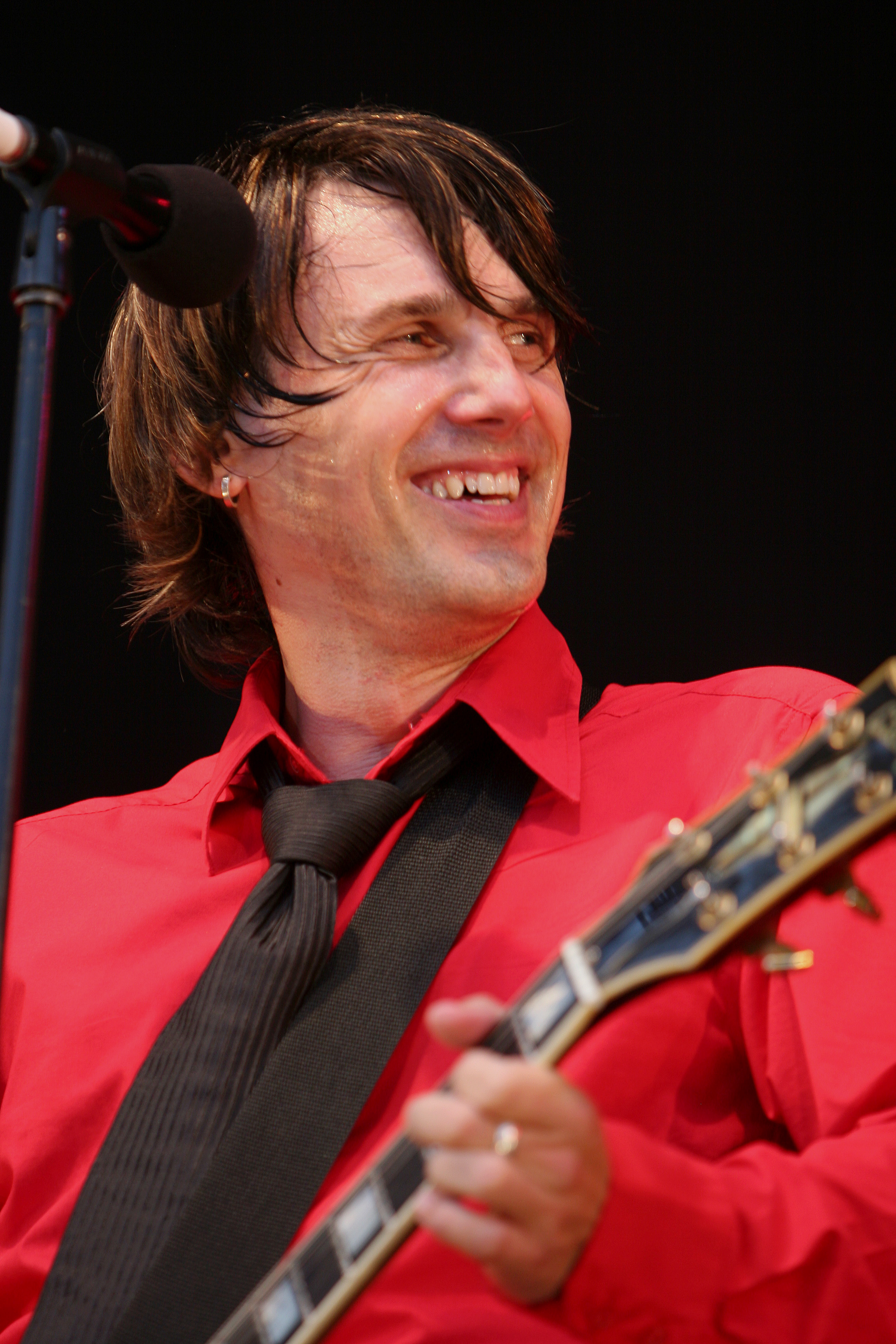
Hendrik Sal-Saller, the lead singer.

- Hendrik Sal-Saller – vocals, guitar
- Urmas Jaarman – bass, backing vocals
- Mikko Saira – keyboards
- Erko Laurimaa – guitar
- Raido Kurri – drums

== Discography ==
Finland:

- Smilers (1994)
- Take Five (1996)

Estonia:

- Olen kuul (1997)
- Mõistus on kadunud (1998)
- 1994–1996 (1999)
- Suure surmaga läbi elu (1999)
- Jalgpall on parem kui sex (2001)
- Remixed (2002)
- Ainult unustamiseks (2003)
- Ainult armastusest (2004)
- Live Unplugged (2005)
- Esimene Eesti tuur (2005)
- Õhus on Smilers (2007)
- ETV Live (2008)
- 2009 (2009)
- Viimane (2011)
- SMILERSXX: 20 aastat meteoriitide sajus (2013)
