= Marko Reikop =

Estonian television host

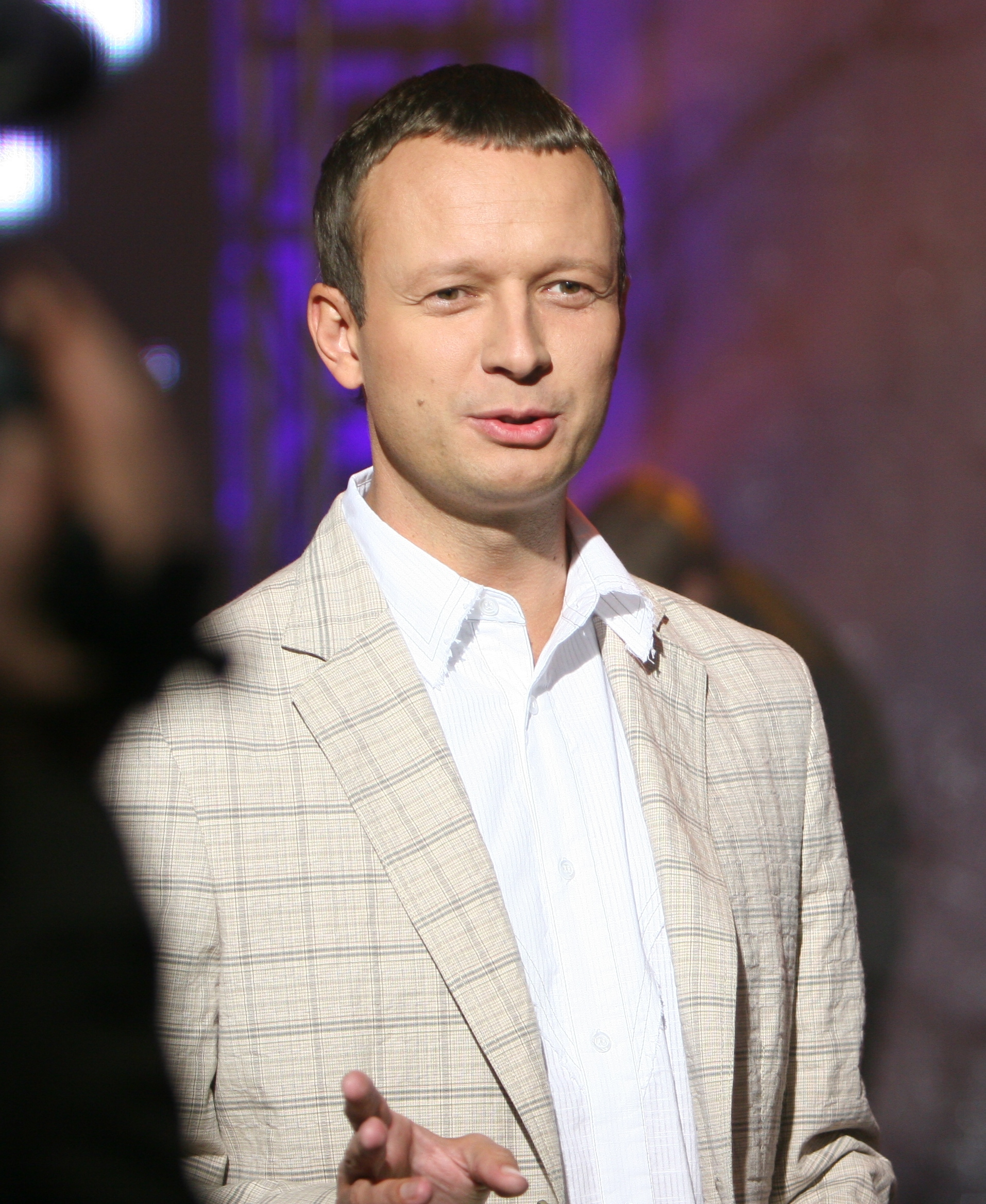
- Marko Reikop in 2007
- Born: 19 June 1969 (age 57); Tallinn, then part of Estonian SSR, Soviet Union
- Occupation: Television host
- Years active: 1991–present
- Employer: Estonian Public Broadcasting
- Television: Ringvaade

Marko Reikop (born 19 June 1969 in Tallinn) is an Estonian television host.

He graduated from Tallinn University, where he studied bibliography, and has been employed by radio and TV channels of Estonian Public Broadcasting since 1991.

He has presented the Estonian national finals for the Eurovision Song Contest and has provided live commentary for the latter through ETV. From 2009 and on, he has presented the daily talk show Ringvaade with Anu Välba (along with Grete Lõbu since autumn of 2013).

In 2018, he received Fifth Class of the Order of the White Star from the President of Estonia.

Reikop is openly gay. In September 2020, Reikop, along with Ringvaade co-host Grete Lõbu, was the subject of an anti-gay slur by Conservative People's Party of Estonia (EKRE) MP and Eesti Rahvusringhääling (ERR) board representative Urmas Reitelmann in a social media post. The post caused backlash by ERR supervisory board member Rein Veidemann and ERR board chair Erik Roose, with Veidemann calling for Reitelmann's removal from the board. Reikop later stated that he considered filing a court action suit against Reitelmann.
