= Terminaator =

Estonian musical group

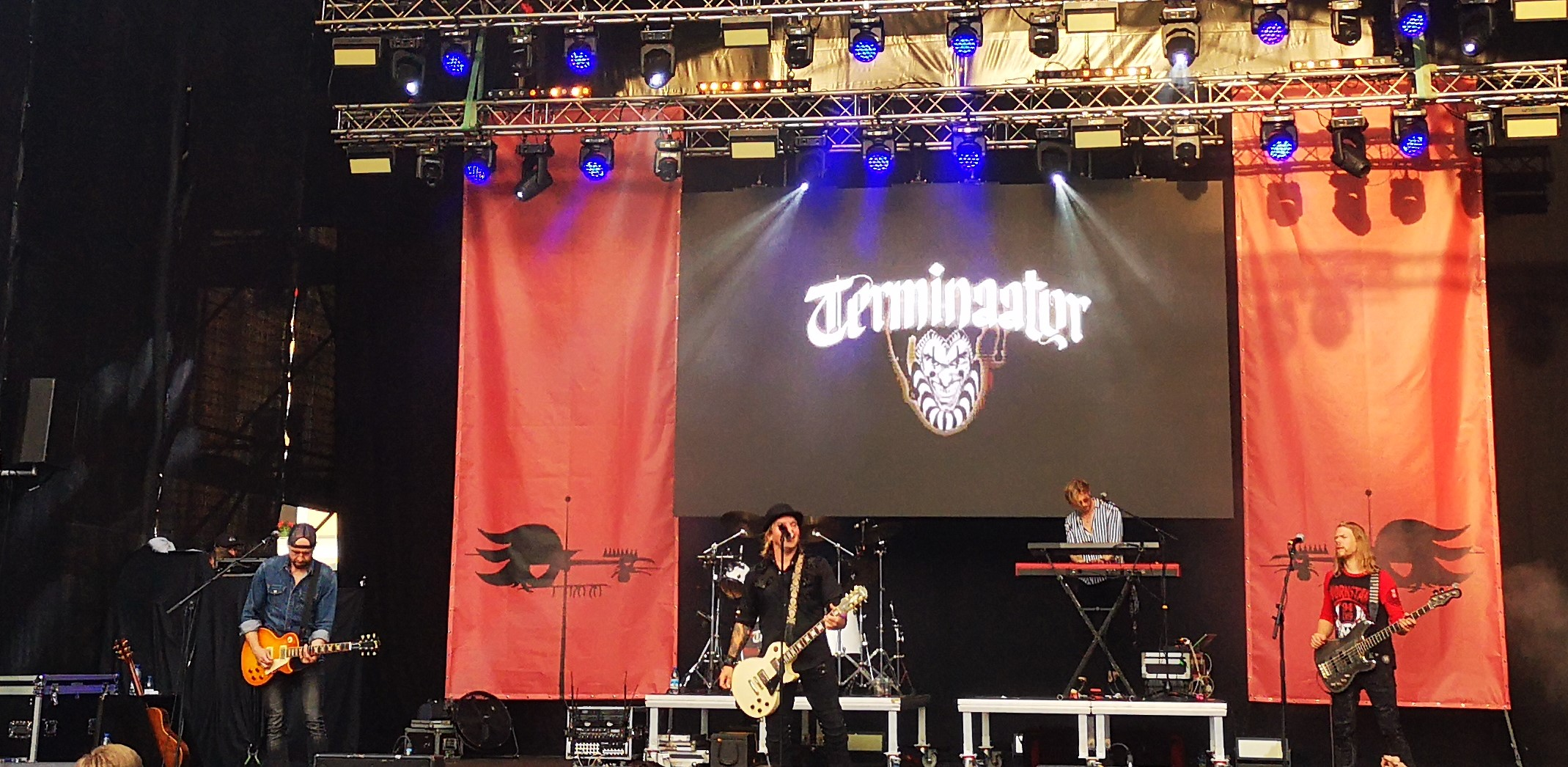
- Terminaator performing at the Tallinn Old Town Days (2021)

Background information
- Origin: Tallinn, Estonia
- Genres: Rock, hard rock, pop rock, punk rock, alternative metal
- Years active: 1987–present
- Website: www.terminaator.ee

Terminaator (Estonian pronunciation: [ˈterminɑːtor]) is an Estonian rock group formed in 1987 by Arno Veimer and Jaagup Kreem in Tallinn 10. High School (today known as Nõmme Gymnasium). Kreem was in the 7th grade then. The first public performance was in Tallinn 47. High School in the schoolbands' festival. The first time in the studio was in 1989. First songs "Charleen" and "Meeletu maailm" were recorded in 1991. They found wider fame in 1992, when they won the festival of young bands Rock In. They have also performed in Latvia, Lithuania and Finland, although they have not had much success outside of Estonia. On the Estonian television show "7 vaprat", Terminaator have appeared playing their songs "Ainult sina võid mu maailma muuta", "Juulikuu lumi", "See ei ole saladus", and "Portselanist tüdruk".

== 2005–2008 ==
2005 saw the release of the band's first live album, Go Live 2005, which was followed in 2006 by Terminaator's 7th studio album Nagu esimene kord. In the same year, Terminaator participated in a musical rendition of Romeo & Julia, which was accompanied by a soundtrack.

In 2007, a traditional anniversary best-of album was released, titled 20, which included two new versions of older songs, two new songs and unreleased live recordings among others. Also, the first proper video was made for "Juulikuu lumi 2007". The second single released was "Ära oota koidikuni".

In 2008, two non-album singles, "Oh kuidas sust puudust tunneme" and "Pilves selgimistega", were released. This is the first time that the band had released songs not featured on any albums (however, it is yet uncertain, if they will be included to the next studio album, due in 2010).

In November 2008, Terminaator did three acoustic concerts, of which one will see a release on CD and DVD in 2009.

== Since 2009 ==
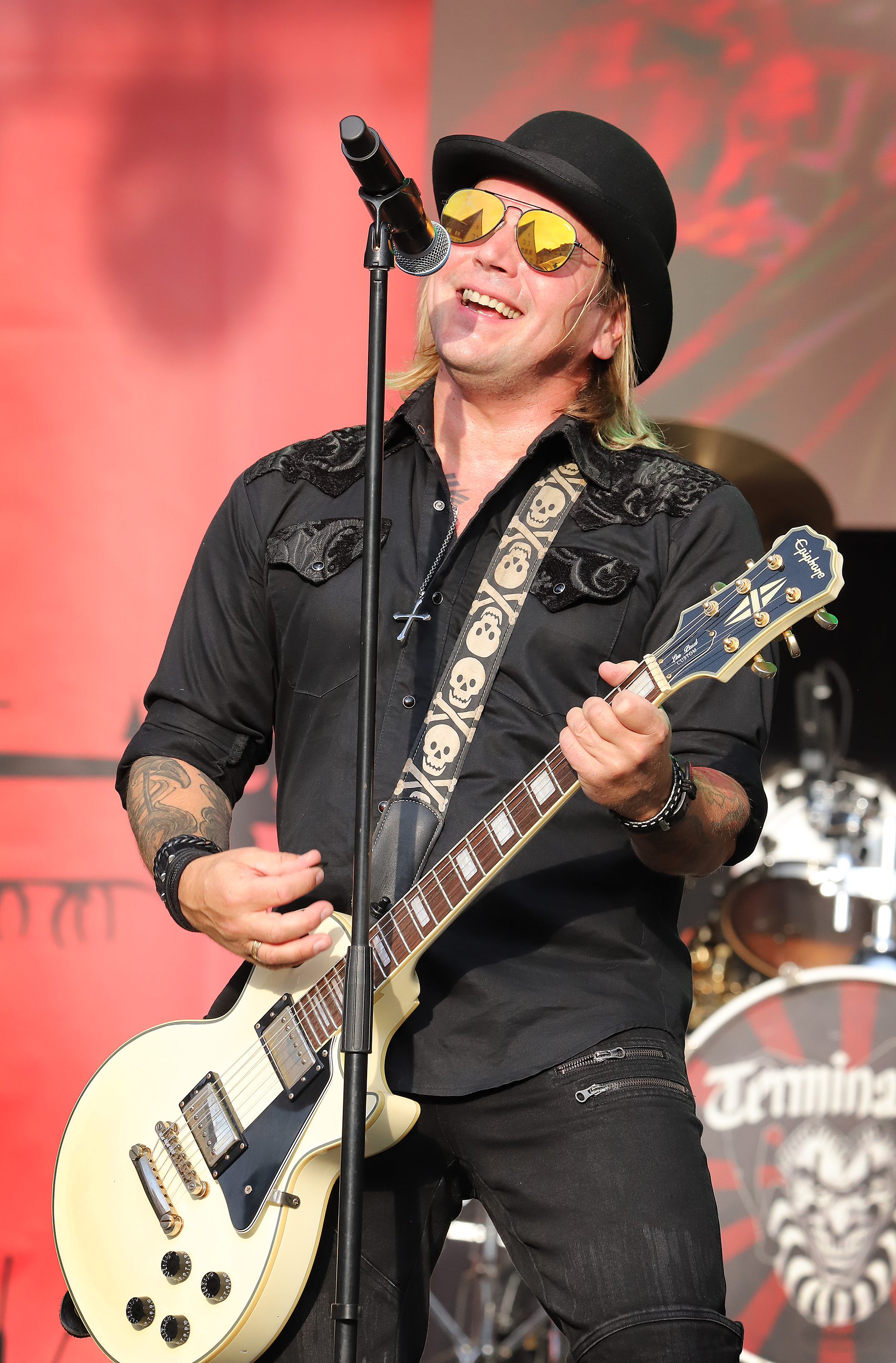
Lead singer Jaagup Kreem at the Tallinn Old Town Days in 2021

On 13 March 2009, Elmar Liitmaa and Harmo Kallaste announced their departure from the band. The reasons given were lack of time and new challenges. Since then, negotiations are being held with the former guitarist of Brides In Bloom, Taavi Langi. According to the band's website, recording of new material started in the end of March and the first single from the upcoming studio album was to be released in April.

The new single, "Just reedeti", debuted on Raadio 2 on 14 May 2009, featuring Taavi Langi on guitar.

The album, Rakett (Rocket), was released on 13 April 2011.

== Members ==
- Jaagup Kreem – vocals, guitar
- Henno Kelp – bass guitar (since 2003)
- Roland Puusepp – drums (since 2003)
- Taavi Langi – guitar (since 2009)
- René Puura - keyboard (since 2021)

=== Former members ===
- Margus Paalamaa (1987–1988) – bass
- Tiit Must (1987–1989) – drums
- Arno "Arch" Veimer (1987–1995, died 2023) – guitar
- Andres Toome (1989–1992) – bass
- Sulev "Sulliwan" Müürsepp (1990–1992; 1996–1998) – guitar
- Raimond "My" Vather (1990–1991) – drums
- Andres Oja (1991) – drums
- Eimel Kaljulaid (1991–2003) – drums
- Indrek Timmer (1992–1995) – bass
- Sven Valdmann (1995–2003) – bass
- Margus Valk (1997–1998) – guitar
- Elmar Liitmaa (1992–1996; 1999–2009) – electric guitar, backing vocals
- Harmo Kallaste (1996; 2000–2009) – keyboards, backing vocals

=== Only on concerts ===
- Antz (1991) – drums
- Tõnu Väärtnõu (1998) – keyboards
- Jüri Roosa (2000) – bass
- Raul Vaigla (2003) – bass

== Awards ==
- Golden Disc – 1998, 2 awards; best band of the year and album of the year
- Music awards – 2001, audience's favourite; 2003, Stiina's favourite
- Raadio 2–1995 & 2002, the first Estonian band to win the first place 2 times in the end of the year chart

== Discography ==
- 1994: Lõputu päev
- 1995: Minu väike paradiis
- 1997: Pühertoonia
- 1997: Kuld
- 1998: Singapur
- 2000: Head uudised
- 2001: Risk
- 2003: Kuutõbine
- 2005: Go Live 2005
- 2006: Nagu esimene kord
- 2006: Romeo & Julia (not released under the name of Terminaator)
- 2007: 20
- 2009: Ingli puudutus
- 2011: Rakett
- 2014: Vaikuse meri
- 2020: Maailm vs. Lilian
