= Friedebert Tuglas short story award =

Estonian literary award

Friedebert Tuglas short story award (Estonian: Friedebert Tuglase novelliauhind) is an Estonian literary award. The award was established in 1970 by Friedebert Tuglas itself. First recipients was chosen out in 1971 by Tuglas itself.

== Recipients ==
1971

- Jaan Kross: Neli monoloogi Püha Jüri asjus. Tallinn 1970
- Paul Kuusberg: Roostetanud kastekann. Looming 7/1970

1972

- Friedebert Tuglas (postum): Helloi maa. Looming 2/1971
- Jaan Kross: Pöördtoolitund. Looming 1/1971

1973

- Arvo Valton: Ohtlik leiutis, in: Õukondlik mäng. Tallinn 1972
- Rein Saluri: Mälu. Looming 4/1972

1974

- Heino Väli: Veri mullal. Looming 3/1973
- Mari Saat: Katastroof. Tallinn 1973

1975

- Uno Laht: Meie, tippkutid, üle kogu maakera, in: Bordelli likvideerimine. Tallinn 1974
- Mats Traat: Kohvioad. Tallinn 1974

1976

- Mati Unt: Via regia. Tallinn 1975
- Kersti Merilaas: Eilsete perest. Looming 8/1975

1977

- Juhan Peegel: Väekargajad. Looming 1/1976
- Betti Alver: Kõmpa. Looming 11/1976

1978

- Paul Kuusberg: Võõras või õige mees? Looming 9/1977.
- Teet Kallas: Tagasi suurte kivide juurde, in: Insener Paberiti juhtum. Tallinn 1977

1979

- Arvo Valton: Mustamäe armastus, in: Mustamäe armastus. Tallinn 1978
- Toomas Vint: Arthur Valdese lugu. Looming 11/1978

1980

- Jaan Kruusvall: Lõhn. Looming 10/1979
- Jaak Jõerüüt: Mr. Dikshit. Looming 4/1979

1981

- Rein Saluri: Lõimetishoole. Looming 11/1980
- Mihkel Mutt: Õpilane Fabian, in: Fabiani õpilane. Tallinn 1980

1982

- Aadu Hint: Tiina(d). Looming 2/1981
- Vaino Vahing: Machiavelli kirjad tütrele II. Looming 12/1981

1983

- Aino Pervik: Anna, in: Impuls. Tallinn 1982
- Asta Põldmäe: Kuumalaine. Looming 5/1982

1984

- Erni Kruste: Rio Grande. Looming 10/1983
- Toomas Vint: See nii ootamatu ja ebamugav surm, in: Tantsud Mozarti saatel. Tallinn 1983

1985

- Einar Maasik: Et rääkisin puudega?, in: Tere, Maria. Tallinn 1984
- Ülo Mattheus: Minu isa luulud, in: Sõna 7. Tallinn 1984

1986

- Mari Saat: Elsa Hermann, in: Õun valguses ja varjus. Tallinn 1985
- Andres Vanapa: Surnutele on ladu avatud. Looming 8/1985

1987

- Lehte Hainsalu: Selle talve isa. Vikerkaar 3/1986
- Jaan Undusk: Sina, Tuglas. Looming 2/1986

1988

- Rein Saluri: 5.3.53. Looming 5/1987
- Leo Anvelt (postum): Külm heldus, in: Uidang mitme tundmatuga. Tallinn 1987

1989

- Raimond Kaugver: Elupäästja. Edasi 27. Februar 1988
- Toomas Raudam: Lodus tiivad, in: Igavene linn. Tallinn 1988

1990

- Jaan Kross: Onu. Looming 12/1989
- Rein Taagepera: Livland, Leaveland. Looming 3/1989

1991

- Jaak Jõerüüt: Mr. Warma ja täiskuu valgus, in: Teateid põrgust. Tallinn 1990
- Madis Kõiv: Film. Vikerkaar 7/1990

1992

- Ilmar Jaks: Number 808. Looming 11/1991
- Jaan Kruusvall: Rännakul. Vikerkaar 11/1991

1993

- Madis Kõiv: Igavese physicuse elu. Looming 8/1992
- Ilmar Talve: Eraõpetlane Abraham Hintsa. Looming 7/1992

1994

- Ülo Mattheus: Buddha-mäng Borgesega päeval kell kaks. Looming 7/1993
- Eeva Park: Juhuslik. Looming 12/1993

1995

- Jaan Kross: Vürst, in: Järelehüüd. Tallinn 1994
- Asta Põldmäe: Vastu ööd. Looming 9/1994

1996

- Peeter Sauter: Kõhuvalu. Vikerkaar 8/1995
- Mats Traat: Võimu rist. Looming 10/1995

1997

- Jüri Ehlvest: Krutsiaania, in: Krutsiaania. Tallinn 1996
- Emil Tode (Tõnu Õnnepalu): Külma kondid. Vikerkaar 12/1996

1998

- Peeter Sauter: Tuimus. Vikerkaar 9/1997
- Andrus Kivirähk: Kunstnik Jaagup. Looming 2/1997

1999

- Mart Kivastik: Morn. Looming 1/1998
- Ervin Õunapuu: Väike Lilli Noarootsist. Looming 10/1998

2000

- Mehis Heinsaar: Liblikmees. Looming 8/1999
- Andres Vanapa: Kriipslugu. Looming 10/1999

2001

- Tarmo Teder: Kohtumine. Looming 11/2000
- Mati Unt: Nouvelle. Looming 2/2000

2002

- Mehis Heinsaar: Ilus Armin. Looming 10/2001
- Mats Traat: Kohtupeegel. Looming 7/2001

2003

- Ürgar Helves (Jüri Ehlvest): Hobune eikusagilt. Looming 1/2002
- Jaan Undusk: Armastus raamatu vastu, in: Puudutus. Tartu 2002

2004

- Ilmar Jaks: Armer Adolf, in: Pimedus. Tartu 2003
- Lauri Pilter: Teisik. Vikerkaar 12/2003

2005

- Madis Kõiv: Nuuma Aljla. Looming 12/2004
- Tarmo Teder: Viimase idealisti pildid. Looming 6/2004

2006

- Armin Kõomägi: Anonüümsed logistikud. Looming 4/2005
- Ülo Tuulik: Eri Klasiga Kielis. Sirp 7. Oktober 2005

2007

- Jürgen Rooste: Pornofilm ja pudel viina. Vikerkaar 6/2006
- Mats Traat: Sarviku armastus. Looming 11/2006

2008

- Mihkel Mutt: Siseemigrant, in: Siseemigrant. Tallinn 2007
- Andrei Hvostov: Sinised mäed. Looming 6/2007

2009

- Indrek Hargla: Minu päevad Liinaga. Looming 8/2008
- Jüri Tuulik: Tellikaatne, in: Räim, pisike kena kala: valitud lugusid ja toiduretsepte. Tallinn 2008

2010

- Mehis Heinsaar: Puhkehetkel. Looming 5/2009
- Sven Vabar: Musta lennuki kirik, in: Tartu rahutused. Tartu 2009

2011

- Maarja Kangro: 48 tundi. Looming 2/2010
- Urmas Vadi: Kuidas me kõik reas niimoodi läheme. Vikerkaar 12/2010

2012

- Kätlin Kaldmaa: Kui poisid tulid. Looming 12/2011
- Toomas Vint: Pettekujutelmade linnuparv, in: Kunstniku elu. Tallinn 2011

2013

- Kai Aareleid: Tango. Looming 4/2012
- Rein Raud: Ja tuleb kord. Looming 12/2012

2014

- Maarja Kangro: Atropose Opel Meriva. Vikerkaar 4-5/2013
- Madis Kõiv: Vikat, in: Uudisjutte tegelikust ning võimalikest maailmadest; nägemused ja uned. Tallinn 2013

2015

- Mart Kivastik: Õnn tuleb magades. Vikerkaar 12/2014
- Mait Vaik: Puhtus, in: Tööpäeva lõpp. Tallinn 2014

2016

- Maimu Berg: Awakenings. Looming 8/2015
- Jüri Kolk: Sünnimärk. Looming 10/2015

2017

- Mudlum (Made Luiga): Ilma alguseta, ilma lõputa, in: Linnu silmad. Tallinn 2016
- Urmas Vadi: Auhind. Vikerkaar 4-5/2016

2018

- Armin Kõomägi: Goglomov
- Lilli Luuk: Auk

2019

- Tiit Aleksejev: Tõlkija
- Jan Kaus: Õnnelik lõpp

2020

- P. I. Filimonov: Sebastian Rüütli tõehetk
- Livia Viitol: Õpetajanna saabumine

2021

- Tauno Vahter: Taevas Tartu kohal
- Lilli Luuk: Kolhoosi miss

2022

- Piret Raud: Pink
- Toomas Haug: Mustjala. Tõestisündinud lugu

2023

- Meelis Friedenthal: Abracadabra
- Katrin Tegova: Teraslind

2024

- Kai Kask: Vaba langemine
- Aliis Aalmann: Mina ei käinud siis veel koolis

2025

- Brigitta Davidjants: Vaikusesse.
- Meiu Münt: Kuidas saada heaks.

2026

- fs: Stefan.
- Silvia Urgas: Eestimaa puit.

== External reading ==
- August Eelmäe. Friedebert Tuglase novelliauhinna asutamislugu. In: Keel ja Kirjandus 1/1988, pages 43–45
