= Meelis Friedenthal =

Estonian writer

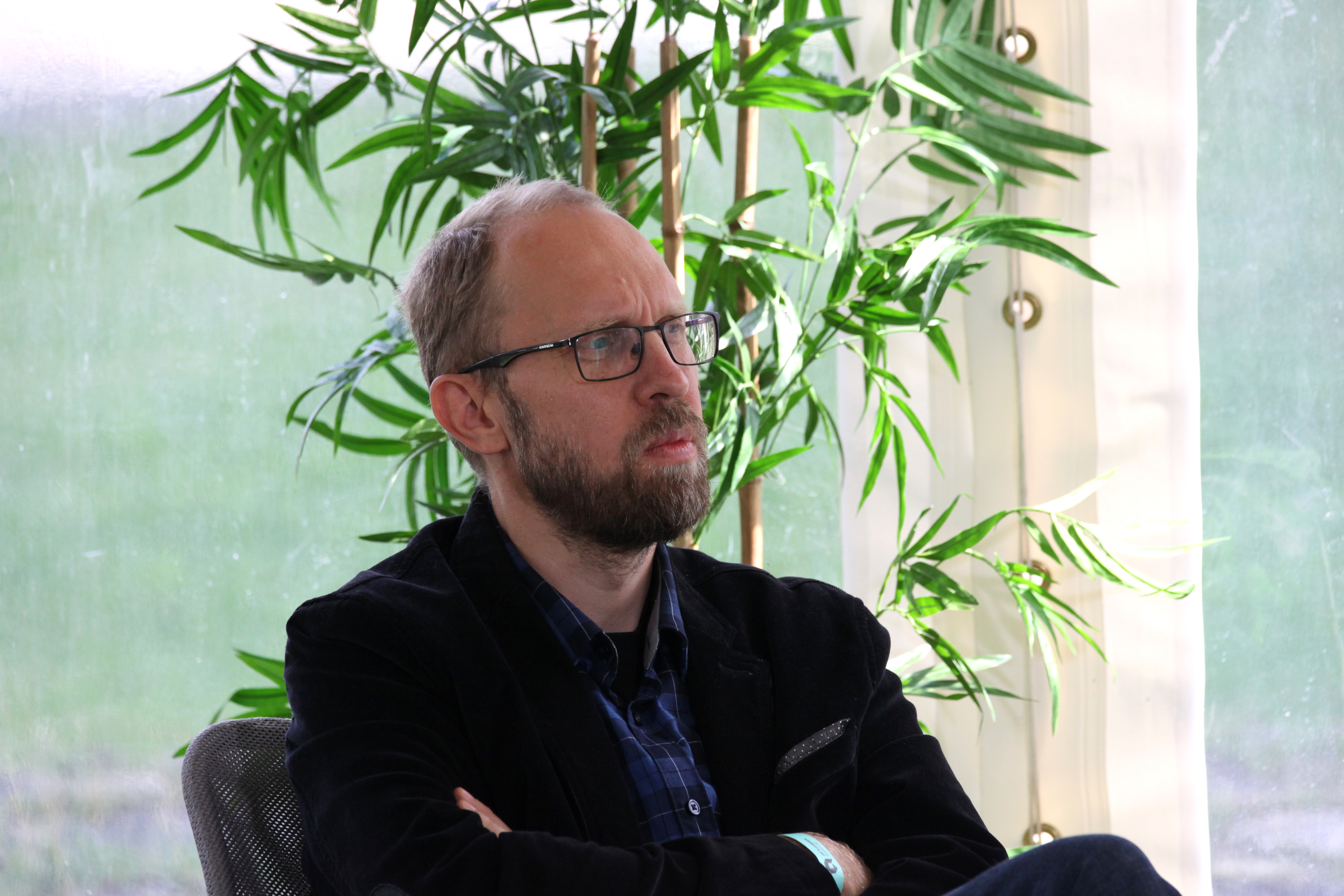
Meelis Friedenthal in 2021

Meelis Friedenthal (born 24 October 1973) is an Estonian academic and writer.

== Biography ==
Friedenthal was born in Viljandi. In 1991, he participated in a student exchange program to Urbana, Illinois. Friedenthal graduated from high school in Tartu in 1992 and studied theology at the University of Tartu from 1992 to 1996. After completing his bachelor's degree, he spent the 1996/1997 academic year at Heidelberg University. He then took a master's degree in Tartu. After completing his master's degree in 2001, he went on to study for a doctorate, which he completed in 2008.

From 2002 to 2008 he held various teaching positions at the University of Tartu. Since 2008 he has been employed as a researcher at the Tartu University Library. In the 2014/2015 academic year he was a postdoc at the Lichtenberg-Kolleg of the University of Göttingen. From 2015 to 2019 he was a Pro Futura Scientia Fellow at the Swedish Collegium for Advanced Study. He is currently Associate Professor of Intellectual History at the University of Tartu.

Meelis Friedenthal has been a member of the Estonian Writers' Union since 2012. He lives in Tartu.

== Works ==
Friedenthal's debut novel won third prize in the 2004 Estonian Writers' Union novel competition and was published in 2005. This novel, Golden Age (Kuldne aeg), is a dystopia that is set after an unspecified global catastrophe in which the (remaining) people struggle and try to organize their life again. The fact that all people have to be vaccinated once a year—against a condition that is not disclosed—led one critic to ask the rhetorical question: "Are we not ourselves the ones who need a constant vaccine to maintain our identity and not to sleep with your eyes open? " Another reviewer drew the comparison to George Orwell and found the novel "so depressive that [he] had to put it aside a few times."

His second novel, The Willow King (Mesilased), won the 2013 European Union Prize for Literature. This is a historical novel set in the 17th century, when Estonia was part of Sweden. It was praised as a work with powerful language that "carries on the best traditions of the Estonian historical novel". The book mainly takes pace in the university city of Tartu. The protagonist Laurentius Hylas, whose nationality is not specified, has completed a medical degree in the Dutch university of Leiden and is now trying to apply and deepen his knowledge in another university town. Laurentius fights against his own melancholy, which the author aptly calls the "disease of the 17th century". The protagonist hopes to find a cure with the help of his studies, "because if there is any cure for melancholy, it is in art and science." The latter is also used against witchcraft, which is another topic in the book that takes place at a time when the last witch trials were conducted in Estonia and Sweden. It is no coincidence that the novel has been compared to Arthur Miller's The Crucible.

Like the novels by Jaan Kross, which often deal with a certain period in Estonian history and to which parallels have also been drawn in reviews, Friedenthal's compact novel throws a spotlight on late 17th-century Estonia. On the threshold of the Enlightenment there is still the fight against the dark - embodied by witchcraft and illustrated by a (historically documented) famine due to poor harvests and constant bad weather. "It was raining all the time," is the first sentence of the book, which is by no means depressing, especially because of the "beautiful and cultivated language."

The novel has been translated into Albanian (2017), Bulgarian (2018), Danish (2018), English (2017), Dutch (2015), Italian (2015), Croatian (2018), Latvian (2015), Lithuanian (2020), Macedonian (2018), Norwegian (2016), Serbian (2018), Czech (2016), and Hungarian (2016).

Meelis Friedenthal's third novel, The Language of Angels (Inglite keel), is about history and the study of history, and describes early modern attempts at the creation of universal languages and efforts to discover the language of Adam and the languages of angels.

== Awards ==
- 2005: Stalker Literature Prize for Science Fiction
- 2012: Author of the Year in Estonia
- 2013: European Union Prize for Literature for Mesilased
- 2023: Friedebert Tuglas short story award for Abracadabra
- 2024: Cultural Endowment of Estonia's Prize for Literature for Punkti ümber

== Books ==
- Kuldne aeg (Golden Age). Tuum, Tallinn 2005. 190 pp.
- Mesilased (The Willow King). Varrak, Tallinn 2012 (2nd edition 2013). 214 pp.
- Inglite keel (The Language of Angels). Varrak, Tallinn 2016. 207 pp.
- Kõik äratatakse ellu (Everyone Will Be Brought to Life). Kirikiri, Tartu 2020. 255 pp.
- Punkti ümber (Around a Point). Varrak, Tallinn 2023. 312 pp.

== Literature ==
- Jaak Tomberg: Mis toimub lahtiste silmadega magava inimese peas. In: Looming 3/2006, pp. 470–472.
- Marju Lepajõe: Võilille surm. In: Vikerkaar, 9/2012, pp. 88–93.
- Pill-Riin Larm: Mesilastest ja mittekangelastest. In: Keel ja Kirjandus, 4/2013, pp. 296–298.
- Meelis Friedenthal, Sven Vabar: Ajalugu tekitab ängi, segadust. Arusaamatust. Hirmu. In: Looming, 1/2007, pp. 77–85.
- Tiit Aleksejev: The Bees. In:Estonian Literary Magazine, 38, spring 2014
