= Perioodika =

Publisher based in Estonia

Perioodika is an Estonian publisher which existed from 1940-1941 and later from 1944–2004 in Tallinn.

Before 1947, Perioodika published newspapers, later transitioning to magazines. Notable publications include Looming, Keel ja Kirjandus, Akadeemia, Vikerkaar, Teater. Muusika. Kino., Täheke, Õpetajate Leht, and Eesti NSV Teaduste Akadeemia Toimetised.

In the 1990s, Perioodika published the fiction series "Europeia".

In 2004, Perioodika ceased operations and its publications were picked up by Kultuurileht SA.
