= October 15 =

October 15 this year in various calendars
- Thursday, 15 October 2026
Akan	Nwonayaw
Armenian	27 Sahmi 1476
Aztec	Izcalli 13, 6 Miquiztli
Babylonian	2 Tashritu, 2337 SE
Balinese pawukon	Menga, Beteng, Menala, Keliwon, Aryang, Wraspati of Kelawu, Uma, Jangur, Manusa
Bengali	30 Ashshin, BS 1433
Chinese	Yang Water Dog・Horn Mansion; Fire Horse Year, Month 9, Day 6 (Hanlu, 8 days until Shuangjiang)
Common Era	15 October 2026 CE
Coptic	5 Paopi, AM 1743
Egyptian	2 Phamenoth, 2775 NE
Ethiopian	5 Ṭeqemt, 2019 Amätä Məhrät
French Republican	Décade III, Tridi de Vendémiaire de l'Année 235 de la République
Gregorian	15 October, AD 2026
Hebrew	4 Cheshvan, AM 5787
Hindu	Jyeṣṭhā・Saubhāgya; Solar: 29 Āśvina, 1948 SE; Lunisolar: Pañcamī, Śukla pakṣa of Āśvina, 2083 VE; Rāudra・5127 KY・1,872,863
Icelandic	Fimmtudagur, 22 Haustmánuður 2026
Islamic	3 Jumada al-awwal, AH 1448 (using tabular method)
ISO week date	2026-W42-4
Japanese	5 Nagatsuki, Reiwa 8 (Kanro, 8 days until Sōkō)
Julian	2 October, AD 2026 (AM 7535)
Julian day	2461329
Korean	5 Gaedal, 4359 DE
Maya	13.0.14.0.6; 19 Yax, 6 Cimi
Roman	ante diem VI Nonas Octobres, MMDCCLXXIX AUC
Solar Hijri	23 Mehr, SH 1405
Tibetan	5 tha skar, me pho rta 2153 or 1772 or 1000

<<	October					>>
Su	Mo	Tu	We	Th	Fr	Sa
				1	2	3
4	5	6	7	8	9	10
11	12	13	14	15	16	17
18	19	20	21	22	23	24
25	26	27	28	29	30	31
2026

October 15 in recent years
2026 (Thursday)
2025 (Wednesday)
2024 (Tuesday)
2023 (Sunday)
2022 (Saturday)
2021 (Friday)
2020 (Thursday)
2019 (Tuesday)
2018 (Monday)
2017 (Sunday)

October 15 is the 288th day of the year (289th in leap years) in the Gregorian calendar; 77 days remain until the end of the year.

== Events ==
=== Pre-1600 ===
- 961 – Al-Hakam II becomes caliph of Cordoba upon the death of his father Abd al-Rahman III.
- 1066 – Following the death of Harold II at the Battle of Hastings, Edgar the Ætheling is proclaimed King of England by the Witan; he is never crowned, and concedes power to William the Conqueror two months later.
- 1211 – Battle of the Rhyndacus: The Latin emperor Henry of Flanders defeats the Nicaean emperor Theodore I Laskaris.
- 1529 – The Siege of Vienna ends when Austria routs the invading Ottoman forces, ending its European expansion.
- 1582 – Adoption of the Gregorian calendar begins, eventually leading to near-universal adoption.

=== 1601–1900 ===
- 1651 – Qing forces capture the island of Zhoushan. Zhu Yihai, Prince of Lu, resident of the island and regent of the Southern Ming, flees to Kinmen.
- 1781 – The Battle of Raft Swamp marks the last battle fought in North Carolina during the American Revolutionary War with a Patriot victory. It occurred four days before the British surrender at Yorktown.
- 1783 – The Montgolfier brothers' hot air balloon makes the first human ascent, piloted by Jean-François Pilâtre de Rozier.
- 1793 – Queen Marie Antoinette of France is tried and convicted of treason.
- 1815 – Napoleon begins his exile on Saint Helena in the South Atlantic Ocean.
- 1864 – American Civil War: The Union garrison of Glasgow, Missouri surrenders to Confederate forces.
- 1888 – The "From Hell" letter allegedly sent by Jack the Ripper is received by investigators.

=== 1901–present ===
- 1910 – Airship America is launched from New Jersey in the first attempt to cross the Atlantic by a powered aircraft.
- 1923 – The German Rentenmark is introduced in Germany to counter hyperinflation in the Weimar Republic.
- 1928 – The airship Graf Zeppelin completes its first trans-Atlantic flight, landing at Lakehurst, New Jersey, United States.
- 1932 – Tata Airlines (later to become Air India) makes its first flight.
- 1939 – The New York Municipal Airport (later renamed LaGuardia Airport) is dedicated.
- 1940 – President Lluís Companys of Catalonia is executed by the Francoist government.
- 1944 – World War II: Germany replaces the Hungarian government after Hungary announces an armistice with the Soviet Union.
- 1951 – Mexican chemist Luis E. Miramontes completes the synthesis of norethisterone, the basis of an early oral contraceptive.
- 1954 – Hurricane Hazel devastates the eastern seaboard of North America, killing 95 and causing massive floods as far north as Toronto.
- 1956 – FORTRAN, the first modern computer language, is first shared with the coding community.
- 1965 – Vietnam War: A draft card is burned during an anti-war rally by the Catholic Worker Movement, resulting in the first arrest under a new law.
- 1966 – The Black Panther Party is created by Huey P. Newton and Bobby Seale.
- 1970 – During the construction of Australia's West Gate Bridge, a span of the bridge falls and kills 35 workers. The incident is the country's worst industrial accident to this day.
- 1979 – Supporters of the Malta Labour Party ransack and destroy the Times of Malta building and other locations associated with the Nationalist Party.
- 1979 – A coup d'état in El Salvador overthrows President Carlos Humberto Romero and begins the 12 year-long Salvadoran Civil War.
- 1987 – Aero Trasporti Italiani Flight 460 crashes near Conca di Crezzo, Italy, killing all 37 people on board.
- 1987 – A coup d'état in Burkina Faso overthrows and kills then President Thomas Sankara.
- 1989 – Wayne Gretzky becomes the all-time leading points scorer in the NHL.
- 1990 – Soviet Union leader Mikhail Gorbachev is awarded the Nobel Peace Prize for his efforts to lessen Cold War tensions and open up his nation.
- 1991 – The "Oh-My-God particle", an ultra-high-energy cosmic ray measured at 40,000,000 times that of the highest energy protons produced in a particle accelerator, is observed at the University of Utah HiRes observatory in Dugway Proving Ground, Utah.
- 1991 – The leaders of the Baltic States, Arnold Rüütel of Estonia, Anatolijs Gorbunovs of Latvia and Vytautas Landsbergis of Lithuania, signed the OSCE Final Act in Helsinki, Finland.
- 1994 – The United States, under the Clinton administration, returns Haiti's first democratically elected president, Jean-Bertrand Aristide, to the island.
- 1997 – The Cassini probe launches from Cape Canaveral on its way to Saturn.
- 2001 – NASA's Galileo spacecraft passes within 112 miles (180 km) of Jupiter's moon Io.
- 2002 – A Soyuz-U rocket carrying Foton-M No.1 fails after liftoff from Plesetsk Cosmodrome and crashes, killing one person and injuring eight others.
- 2003 – China launches Shenzhou 5, its first crewed space mission.
- 2006 – The 6.7 M_{w} Kiholo Bay earthquake rocks Hawaii, causing property damage, injuries, landslides, power outages, and the closure of Honolulu International Airport.
- 2007 – Seventeen activists in New Zealand are arrested in the country's first post-9/11 anti-terrorism raids.
- 2008 – The Dow Jones Industrial Average closes down 733.08 points, or 7.87%, the second worst percentage drop in the Dow's history.
- 2013 – The 7.2 M_{w} Bohol earthquake strikes the Philippines. At least 215 were killed.
- 2016 – One hundred and ninety-seven nations amend the Montreal Protocol to include a phase-out of hydrofluorocarbons.
- 2018 – 13-year-old American girl, Jayme Closs, is kidnapped from her Barron, Wisconsin home after her parents were both murdered.

== Births ==
=== Pre-1600 ===
- 70 BC – Virgil, Roman poet (died 19 BC)
- 1265 – Temür Khan, Emperor Chengzong of Yuan (died 1307)
- 1440 – Henry III, Landgrave of Upper Hesse, German noble (died 1483)
- 1471 – Konrad Mutian, German epigrammatist and academic (died 1526)
- 1542 – Akbar, Mughal emperor (died 1605)
- 1561 – Richard Field, English cathedral dean (died 1616)
- 1564 – Henry Julius, Duke of Brunswick-Lüneburg (died 1613)
- 1599 – Cornelis de Graeff, Dutch mayor and regent of Amsterdam (died 1664)

=== 1601–1900 ===
- 1608 – Evangelista Torricelli, Italian physicist and mathematician (died 1647)
- 1622 – Magnus Gabriel De la Gardie, Swedish statesman and military man (died 1686)
- 1686 – Allan Ramsay, Scottish poet and playwright (died 1758)
- 1701 – Marie-Marguerite d'Youville, Canadian nun and saint, founded Grey Nuns (died 1771)
- 1711 – Elisabeth Therese of Lorraine, Queen of Sardinia (died 1741)
- 1762 – Samuel Adams Holyoke, American composer and educator (died 1820)
- 1765 – Sir George Pocock, 1st Baronet, English politician and peer (died 1840)
- 1767 – Gabriel Richard, French-born American Roman Catholic priest, missionary, educator, and politician (died 1832)
- 1775 – Bernhard Crusell, Finnish composer (died 1838)
- 1784 – Thomas Robert Bugeaud, French general and politician, Governor-General of Algeria (died 1849)
- 1785 – José Miguel Carrera, Chilean general and politician (died 1821)
- 1789 – William Christopher Zeise, Danish chemist who prepared Zeise's salt, one of the first organometallic compounds (died 1847)
- 1802 – Louis-Eugène Cavaignac, French general and politician, head of state of France in 1848 (died 1857)
- 1814 – Mikhail Lermontov, Russian author, poet, and painter (died 1841)
- 1816 – John Robertson, English-Australian politician, 5th Premier of New South Wales (died 1891)
- 1818 – Alexander Dreyschock, Czech pianist and composer (died 1869)
- 1825 – Marie of Prussia, Queen of Bavaria (died 1889)
- 1829 – Asaph Hall, American astronomer and academic (died 1907)
- 1833 – John Alexander MacPherson, Australian politician, 7th Premier of Victoria (died 1894)
- 1836 – James Tissot, French painter and illustrator (died 1902)
- 1840 – Honoré Mercier, Canadian journalist, lawyer, and politician, 9th Premier of Quebec (died 1894)
- 1844 – Friedrich Nietzsche, German composer, poet, and philosopher (died 1900)
- 1858 – John L. Sullivan, American boxer, actor, and journalist (died 1918)
- 1865 – Charles W. Clark, American singer and educator (died 1925)
- 1872 – Wilhelm Miklas, Austrian educator and politician, 3rd President of Austria (died 1956)
- 1872 – August Nilsson, Swedish pole vaulter, shot putter, and tug of war competitor (died 1921)
- 1874 – Alfred, Hereditary Prince of Saxe-Coburg and Gotha (died 1899)
- 1878 – Paul Reynaud, French lawyer and politician, 118th Prime Minister of France (died 1966)
- 1879 – Jane Darwell, American actress (died 1967)
- 1881 – P. G. Wodehouse, English novelist and playwright (died 1975)
- 1882 – Charley O'Leary, American baseball player and coach (died 1941)
- 1884 – Archibald Hoxsey, American pilot (died 1910)
- 1887 – Frederick Fleet, English sailor and lookout on the Titanic (died 1965)
- 1888 – S. S. Van Dine, American author and critic (died 1939)
- 1890 – Álvaro de Campos, Portuguese poet and engineer (died 1935)
- 1893 – Carol II of Romania, King of Romania (died 1953)
- 1894 – Moshe Sharett, Ukrainian-Israeli lieutenant and politician, 2nd Prime Minister of Israel (died 1965)
- 1897 – Johannes Sikkar, Estonian soldier and politician, Prime Minister of Estonia in exile (died 1960)
- 1899 – Adolf Brudes, Polish-German racing driver (died 1986)
- 1900 – Mervyn LeRoy, American actor, director, and producer (died 1987)

=== 1901–present ===
- 1901 – Enrique Jardiel Poncela, Spanish playwright and novelist (died 1952)
- 1905 – C. P. Snow, English chemist and author (died 1980)
- 1906 – Hiram Fong, American soldier and politician (died 2004)
- 1906 – Alicia Patterson, American journalist and publisher, co-founded Newsday (died 1963)
- 1906 – Victoria Spivey, American singer-songwriter and pianist (died 1976)
- 1907 – Varian Fry, American journalist and author (died 1967)
- 1908 – Herman Chittison, American pianist (died 1967)
- 1908 – John Kenneth Galbraith, Canadian-American economist and diplomat, 7th United States Ambassador to India (died 2006)
- 1909 – Jesse L. Greenstein, American astronomer and academic (died 2002)
- 1909 – Robert Trout, American journalist (died 2000)
- 1910 – Edwin O. Reischauer, Japanese-American scholar and diplomat, United States Ambassador to Japan (died 1990)
- 1912 – Nellie Lutcher, American singer and pianist (died 2007)
- 1913 – Wolfgang Lüth, German U-boat captain (died 1945)
- 1914 – Mohammed Zahir Shah, Afghan king (died 2007)
- 1916 – Al Killian, American trumpet player and bandleader (died 1950)
- 1916 – George Turner, Australian author and critic (died 1997)
- 1917 – Jan Miner, American actress (died 2004)
- 1917 – Arthur M. Schlesinger Jr., American historian and critic (died 2007)
- 1917 – Paul Tanner, American trombonist and educator (died 2013)
- 1919 – Malcolm Ross, American captain, balloonist, and physicist (died 1985)
- 1919 – Chuck Stevenson, American race car driver (died 1995)
- 1920 – Chris Economaki, American sportscaster and actor (died 2012)
- 1920 – Patricia Jessel, Hong Kong-English actress (died 1968)
- 1920 – Peter Koch, American industrial engineer and wood scientist (died 1998)
- 1920 – Mario Puzo, American author and screenwriter (died 1999)
- 1920 – Henri Verneuil, Turkish-French director, producer, and screenwriter (died 2002)
- 1921 – Angelica Rozeanu, Romanian-Israeli table tennis player (died 2006)
- 1922 – Agustina Bessa-Luís, Portuguese author (died 2019)
- 1922 – Tommy Edwards, American singer-songwriter (died 1969)
- 1922 – Preben Munthe, Norwegian economist and politician, State Conciliator of Norway (died 2013)
- 1923 – Italo Calvino, Italian novelist, short story writer, and journalist (died 1985)
- 1923 – Antonio Fontán, Spanish journalist and politician (died 2010)
- 1923 – Eugene Patterson, American journalist and activist (died 2013)
- 1923 – Lindsay Thompson, Australian politician, 40th Premier of Victoria (died 2008)
- 1924 – Marguerite Andersen, German-Canadian author and educator (died 2022)
- 1924 – Lee Iacocca, American businessman and author (died 2019)
- 1924 – Warren Miller, American director and screenwriter (died 2018)
- 1925 – Mickey Baker, American-French guitarist (died 2012)
- 1925 – Aurora Bautista, Spanish actress (died 2012)
- 1925 – Tony Hart, English painter and television host (died 2009)
- 1926 – James E. Akins, American soldier and diplomat, United States Ambassador to Saudi Arabia (died 2010)
- 1926 – Agustín García Calvo, Spanish philosopher and poet (died 2012)
- 1926 – Michel Foucault, French historian and philosopher (died 1984)
- 1926 – Ed McBain, American author and screenwriter (died 2005)
- 1926 – Jean Peters, American actress (died 2000)
- 1926 – Karl Richter, German organist and conductor (died 1981)
- 1927 – B. S. Abdur Rahman, Indian businessman and philanthropist (died 2015)
- 1929 – Hubert Dreyfus, American philosopher best known for his critiques of AI (died 2017)
- 1929 – Will Insley, American painter and architect (died 2011)
- 1930 – FM-2030, Belgian-Iranian basketball player, philosopher and diplomat (died 2000)
- 1930 – Ned McWherter, American politician, 46th Governor of Tennessee (died 2011)
- 1931 – A. P. J. Abdul Kalam, Indian engineer, academic, and politician, 11th President of India (died 2015)
- 1931 – Freddy Cole, American jazz singer and pianist (died 2020)
- 1931 – Pauline Perry, Baroness Perry of Southwark, English academic and politician
- 1932 – Jaan Rääts, Estonian guitarist and composer (died 2020)
- 1933 – Nicky Barnes, American drug lord (died 2012)
- 1934 – Alan Elsdon, English trumpet player (died 2016)
- 1934 – N. Ramani, Indian flute player (died 2015)
- 1935 – Barry McGuire, American singer-songwriter and guitarist
- 1935 – Dick McTaggart, Scottish boxer (died 2025)
- 1935 – Bobby Morrow, American sprinter (died 2020)
- 1935 – Willie O'Ree, Canadian ice hockey player, first black player in the National Hockey League (NHL)
- 1936 – Michel Aumont, French actor (died 2019)
- 1936 – Robert Baden-Powell, 3rd Baron Baden-Powell, South African-English businessman (died 2019)
- 1937 – Linda Lavin, American actress and singer (died 2024)
- 1938 – Marv Johnson, American singer-songwriter and pianist (died 1993)
- 1938 – Fela Kuti, Nigerian musician and activist (died 1997)
- 1938 – Brice Marden, American painter (died 2023)
- 1938 – Robert Ward, American guitarist and songwriter (died 2008)
- 1940 – Tommy Bishop, English rugby league player and coach
- 1940 – Peter C. Doherty, Australian surgeon and immunologist, Nobel Prize laureate
- 1941 – Roy Masters, Australian rugby league coach, journalist, and author
- 1942 – Hilo Chen, Taiwanese-American painter
- 1942 – Harold W. Gehman, Jr., American admiral
- 1942 – Don Stevenson, American singer-songwriter and drummer
- 1943 – Stanley Fischer, American and Israeli economist (died 2025)
- 1943 – Penny Marshall, American actress, director, and producer (died 2018)
- 1944 – Sali Berisha, Albanian cardiologist and politician, 2nd President of Albania
- 1944 – A. Chandranehru, Sri Lankan Tamil merchant seaman and politician (died 2005)
- 1944 – Haim Saban, Israeli-American businessman, co-founded Saban Entertainment
- 1944 – David Trimble, Northern Irish lawyer and politician, 3rd First Minister of Northern Ireland, Nobel Prize laureate (died 2022)
- 1945 – Steve Camacho, Guyanese cricketer (died 2015)
- 1945 – Antonio Cañizares Llovera, Spanish cardinal
- 1945 – Neophyte of Bulgaria, Bulgarian patriarch (died 2024)
- 1945 – Jim Palmer, American baseball player and sportscaster
- 1946 – Victor Banerjee, Indian actor and director
- 1946 – Richard Carpenter, American singer-songwriter and pianist
- 1946 – Palle Danielsson, Swedish bassist and composer
- 1946 – Stewart Stevenson, Scottish engineer and politician, Minister for Environment and Climate Change
- 1947 – Hümeyra, Turkish singer-songwriter and actress
- 1947 – Jaroslav Erno Šedivý, Czech drummer
- 1948 – Renato Corona, Filipino lawyer and jurist, 23rd Chief Justice of the Supreme Court of the Philippines (died 2016)
- 1948 – Chris de Burgh, British-Irish singer-songwriter and pianist
- 1949 – Laurie McBain, American author
- 1949 – Prannoy Roy, Indian journalist, economist, and broadcaster, founded NDTV
- 1950 – Candida Royalle, American porn actress, director, and producer (died 2015)
- 1951 – Peter Richardson, English actor, director, and screenwriter
- 1951 – Roscoe Tanner, American tennis player
- 1951 – Rafael Vaganian, Armenian chess player
- 1953 – Betsy Clifford, Canadian skier
- 1953 – Tito Jackson, American singer-songwriter and guitarist (died 2024)
- 1953 – Larry Miller, American actor and comedian
- 1953 – Peter Phillips, English conductor and musicologist
- 1954 – Peter Bakowski, Australian poet and educator
- 1954 – Steve Bracks, Australian politician, 44th Premier of Victoria
- 1954 – Jere Burns, American actor
- 1954 – Julia Yeomans, English physicist and academic
- 1955 – Kulbir Bhaura, Indian field hockey player
- 1955 – Emma Chichester Clark, English author and illustrator
- 1955 – Tanya Roberts, American actress (died 2021)
- 1957 – Michael Caton-Jones, Scottish actor, director, and producer
- 1957 – Mira Nair, Indian-American actress, director, and producer
- 1957 – Stacy Peralta, American skateboarder, director, producer, and businessman, co-founded Powell Peralta
- 1958 – Stephen Clarke, English-French journalist and author
- 1959 – Emeril Lagasse, American chef and author
- 1959 – Alex Paterson, English keyboard player
- 1959 – Sarah Ferguson
- 1959 – Todd Solondz, American actor, director, and screenwriter
- 1961 – Vyacheslav Butusov, Russian singer-songwriter and guitarist
- 1963 – Stanley Menzo, Dutch footballer and manager
- 1964 – Roberto Vittori, Italian colonel, pilot, and astronaut
- 1965 – Nasser El Sonbaty, German bodybuilder and trainer (died 2013)
- 1966 – Eric Benét, American singer-songwriter
- 1966 – Jorge Campos, Mexican footballer and manager
- 1966 – Bill Charlap, American pianist and composer
- 1966 – Ilse Huizinga, Dutch singer
- 1966 – Dave Stead, English drummer
- 1967 – Dan Forest, American politician, 34th Lieutenant Governor of North Carolina
- 1967 – Götz Otto, German actor and screenwriter
- 1968 – Didier Deschamps, French footballer and manager
- 1968 – Vanessa Marcil, American actress
- 1968 – Rod Wishart, Australian rugby league player
- 1968 – Trent Zimmerman, Australian politician
- 1969 – Vítor Baía, Portuguese footballer
- 1969 – Dominic West, English actor and director
- 1970 – Ginuwine, American singer-songwriter, dancer, and actor
- 1970 – Pernilla Wiberg, Swedish skier
- 1971 – Andy Cole, English footballer and coach
- 1971 – Lauri Pilter, Estonian author and translator
- 1972 – Fred Hoiberg, American basketball player and coach
- 1972 – Michél Mazingu-Dinzey, German-Congolese footballer and manager
- 1973 – Aleksandr Filimonov, Russian footballer
- 1974 – Bianca Rinaldi, Brazilian actress
- 1976 – Elisa Aguilar, Spanish basketball player
- 1975 – Chukwudi Iwuji, Nigerian-British actor
- 1977 – Masato Kawabata, Japanese racing driver
- 1977 – Erin McKeown, American indie rock-folk musician and singer-songwriter
- 1977 – David Trezeguet, French footballer
- 1977 – Patricio Urrutia, Ecuadorian footballer
- 1978 – Wes Moore, American politician, author, nonprofit executive, and television producer, 63rd Governor of Maryland
- 1978 – Takeshi Morishima, Japanese wrestler
- 1979 – Bohemia, Pakistani-American rapper and producer
- 1979 – Paul Robinson, English footballer
- 1979 – Jaci Velasquez, American singer-songwriter and actress
- 1979 – Māris Verpakovskis, Latvian footballer
- 1980 – Tom Boonen, Belgian cyclist
- 1981 – Keyshia Cole, American singer-songwriter and producer
- 1981 – Elena Dementieva, Russian tennis player
- 1982 – Charline Labonté, French Canadian ice hockey goaltender (Canadian team)
- 1983 – Stephy Tang, Hong Kong singer
- 1983 – Bruno Senna, Brazilian race car driver
- 1984 – Izale McLeod, English footballer
- 1984 – Jessie Ware, English singer-songwriter
- 1985 – Arron Afflalo, American basketball player
- 1986 – Lee Donghae, South Korean singer-songwriter
- 1986 – Carlo Janka, Swiss skier
- 1986 – Nolito, Spanish footballer
- 1987 – Ott Tänak, Estonian racing driver
- 1988 – Dominique Jones, American basketball player
- 1988 – Mesut Özil, German footballer
- 1989 – Blaine Gabbert, American football player
- 1989 – Anthony Joshua, British professional boxer
- 1990 – Jeon Ji-yoon, South Korean singer-songwriter and dancer
- 1991 – Brock Nelson, American ice hockey player
- 1992 – Ncuti Gatwa, Rwandan-Scottish actor
- 1992 – Teoscar Hernández, Dominican baseball player
- 1992 – Vincent Martella, American actor
- 1993 – Richaun Holmes, American basketball player
- 1993 – Roh Tae-hyun, South Korean singer and dancer
- 1994 – Lil' Kleine, Dutch rapper
- 1994 – Babar Azam, Pakistani cricket player
- 1995 – Jack Flaherty, American baseball player
- 1995 – Jakob Pöltl, Austrian basketball player
- 1996 – Charly Musonda, Belgian footballer
- 1996 – Grace Van Dien, American actress
- 1996 – Zelo, South Korean rapper and dancer
- 1998 – Teuku Wariza Aris Munandar, Indonesian activist and politician
- 1999 – Bailee Madison, American-Canadian actress and singer
- 1999 – Ben Woodburn, Welsh footballer
- 2000 – Melki Sedek Huang, Indonesian activist and sex offender
- 2005 – Christian, Crown Prince of Denmark

== Deaths ==
=== Pre-1600 ===
- 55 BC – Lucretius, Roman poet and philosopher (born 98 BC)
- 412 – Theophilus, Patriarch of Alexandria
- 892 – Al-Mu'tamid, Abbasid caliph
- 898 – Lambert of Italy (born 880)
- 912 – Abdullah ibn Muhammad al-Umawi, Spanish emir (born 844)
- 925 – Rhazes, Persian polymath (born 864)
- 961 – Abd-al-Rahman III, caliph of Córdoba
- 1002 – Otto-Henry, Duke of Burgundy (born 946)
- 1080 – Rudolf of Rheinfelden (born 1025)
- 1173 – Petronilla of Aragon (born 1135)
- 1240 – Razia Sultana, sultan of Delhi (born 1205)
- 1243 – Hedwig of Silesia, Polish saint (born 1174)
- 1326 – Walter Stapledon, bishop and Lord High Treasurer of England, and his brother Sir Richard Stapledon, judge and politician.
- 1385 – Dionysius I, Metropolitan of Moscow
- 1389 – Pope Urban VI (born 1318)
- 1404 – Marie Valois, French princess (born 1344)
- 1496 – Gilbert, Count of Montpensier (born 1443)
- 1564 – Andreas Vesalius, Belgian-Greek anatomist, physician, and author (born 1514)

=== 1601–1900 ===
- 1674 – Robert Herrick, English poet (born 1591)
- 1684 – Géraud de Cordemoy, French historian, philosopher and lawyer (born 1626)
- 1690 – Juan de Valdés Leal, Spanish painter and illustrator (born 1622)
- 1715 – Humphry Ditton, English mathematician and philosopher (born 1675)
- 1788 – Samuel Greig, Scottish-Russian admiral (born 1735)
- 1810 – Alfred Moore, American captain and judge (born 1755)
- 1811 – Nathaniel Dance-Holland, English painter and politician (born 1735)
- 1817 – Tadeusz Kościuszko, Polish-Lithuanian general and engineer (born 1746)
- 1819 – Sergey Vyazmitinov, Russian general and politician, War Governor of Saint Petersburg (born 1744)
- 1820 – Karl Philipp, Prince of Schwarzenberg (born 1771)
- 1837 – Ivan Dmitriev, Russian poet and politician, Russian Minister of Justice (born 1760)
- 1838 – Letitia Elizabeth Landon, English poet and novelist (born 1802)
- 1891 – Gilbert Arthur à Beckett, English author and songwriter (born 1837)
- 1900 – Zdeněk Fibich, Czech pianist and composer (born 1850)

=== 1901–present ===
- 1910 – Stanley Ketchel, American boxer (born 1886)
- 1917 – Mata Hari, Dutch dancer and spy (born 1876)
- 1918 – Sai Baba of Shirdi, Indian guru and saint (born 1838)
- 1925 – Dolores Jiménez y Muro, Mexican revolutionary (born 1848?)
- 1930 – Herbert Henry Dow, Canadian-American businessman, founded the Dow Chemical Company (born 1866)
- 1934 – Raymond Poincaré, French lawyer and politician, 10th President of France (born 1860)
- 1940 – Lluís Companys, Catalan lawyer and politician, President of Catalonia (born 1882)
- 1945 – Pierre Laval, French lawyer and politician, 101st Prime Minister of France, convicted Vichy collaborator (born 1883)
- 1946 – Hermann Göring, German general and Nazi politician, convicted Nuremberg war criminal (born 1893)
- 1948 – Edythe Chapman, American actress (born 1863)
- 1955 – Fumio Hayasaka, Japanese composer (born 1914)
- 1958 – Asaf Halet Çelebi, Turkish poet and author (born 1907)
- 1958 – Elizabeth Alexander, British geologist, academic, and physicist (born 1908)
- 1959 – Stepan Bandera, Ukrainian soldier and politician (born 1909)
- 1959 – Lipót Fejér, Hungarian mathematician and academic (born 1880)
- 1960 – Clara Kimball Young, American actress and producer (born 1890)
- 1961 – Suryakant Tripathi 'Nirala', Indian poet and author (born 1896)
- 1963 – Horton Smith, American golfer and captain (born 1908)
- 1964 – Cole Porter, American composer and songwriter (born 1891)
- 1965 – Abraham Fraenkel, German-Israeli mathematician and academic (born 1891)
- 1966 – Frederick Montague, 1st Baron Amwell, English lieutenant and politician (born 1876)
- 1968 – Virginia Lee Burton, American author and illustrator (born 1909)
- 1976 – Carlo Gambino, Italian-American mob boss (born 1902)
- 1978 – W. Eugene Smith, American photojournalist (born 1918)
- 1978 – Rolf Stenersen, Norwegian businessman (born 1899)
- 1980 – Mikhail Lavrentyev, Russian physicist and mathematician (born 1900)
- 1980 – Apostolos Nikolaidis, Greek footballer and volleyball player (born 1896)
- 1983 – Pat O'Brien, American actor (born 1899)
- 1987 – Thomas Sankara, Burkinabe captain and politician, 5th President of Burkina Faso (born 1949)
- 1987 – Donald Wandrei, American author and poet (born 1908)
- 1988 – Kaikhosru Shapurji Sorabji, English composer, music critic, pianist and writer (born 1892)
- 1989 – Danilo Kiš, Serbian novelist, short story writer, essayist and translator. (born 1935)
- 1990 – Delphine Seyrig, French actress and director (born 1932)
- 1993 – Aydın Sayılı, Turkish historian and academic (born 1913)
- 1994 – Sarah Kofman, French philosopher and academic (born 1934)
- 1995 – Bengt Åkerblom, Swedish ice hockey player (born 1967)
- 1995 – Marco Campos, Brazilian racing driver, only driver ever killed in the International Formula 3000 series (born 1976)
- 1999 – Josef Locke, British-Irish soldier, policeman, tenor and actor (born 1917)
- 2000 – Konrad Emil Bloch, Polish-American biochemist and academic, Nobel Prize laureate (born 1912)
- 2000 – Vincent Canby, American journalist and critic (born 1924)
- 2001 – Zhang Xueliang, Chinese general and warlord (born 1901)
- 2003 – Ben Metcalfe, Canadian journalist and activist (born 1919)
- 2004 – Per Højholt, Danish poet (born 1928)
- 2005 – Jason Collier, American basketball player (born 1977)
- 2005 – Matti Wuori, Finnish lawyer and politician (born 1945)
- 2007 – Piet Boukema, Dutch jurist and politician (born 1933)
- 2008 – Edie Adams, American actress and singer (born 1927)
- 2008 – Fazıl Hüsnü Dağlarca, Turkish soldier and poet (born 1914)
- 2008 – Jack Narz, American game show host and announcer (born 1922)
- 2009 – Heinz Versteeg, Dutch-German footballer (born 1939)
- 2010 – Richard C. Miller, American photographer (born 1912)
- 2010 – Mildred Fay Jefferson, American physician and activist (born 1926)
- 2010 – Johnny Sheffield, American actor (born 1931)
- 2011 – Betty Driver, English actress, singer, and author (born 1920)
- 2012 – Claude Cheysson, French lieutenant and politician, French Minister of Foreign Affairs (born 1920)
- 2012 – Erol Günaydın, Turkish actor and screenwriter (born 1933)
- 2012 – Maria Petrou, Greek-English computer scientist and academic (born 1953)
- 2012 – Norodom Sihanouk, Cambodian politician, 1st Prime Minister of Cambodia (born 1922)
- 2013 – Donald Bailey, American drummer (born 1933)
- 2014 – Giovanni Reale, Italian philosopher and historian (born 1931)
- 2017 – Chinggoy Alonzo, Filipino theater, movie & television actor (born 1950)
- 2017 – Deng Ken, Chinese politician, younger brother of former Paramount leader of China Deng Xiaoping (born 1911)
- 2018 – Paul Allen, co-founder of Microsoft, philanthropist, owner of the Seattle Seahawks (born 1953)
- 2021 – David Amess, British politician, member of Parliament for Southend West (born 1952)
- 2024 – Mike Jackson, English general (born 1944)
- 2025 – Jim Bolger, New Zealand businessman and politician, 35th Prime Minister of New Zealand (born 1935)

== Holidays and observances ==
- Breast Health Day (Europe)
- Christian feast day:
  - Gundisalvus of Lagos
  - Magdalene of Nagasaki
  - Teresa of Ávila
  - Thecla of Kitzingen
  - October 15 (Eastern Orthodox liturgics)
- National Latino AIDS Awareness Day (United States)
- Shwmae Su'mae Day (Wales)
- White Cane Safety Day
- World Students' Day
