= Under and Tuglas Literature Centre =

Research institute of the Estonian Academy of Sciences

Under and Tuglas Literary Institute of the Estonian Academy of Sciences (Estonian: Eesti Teaduste Akadeemia Underi ja Tuglase Kirjandusinstituut, abbreviated UTL; known as the Under and Tuglas Literature Centre until 2025) is a research and development institution of the Estonian Academy of Sciences, located in the Academy's building at Kohtu Street 6 on Toompea, Tallinn, Estonia. The Institute is named after the Estonian poet Marie Under and the writer and literary historian Friedebert Tuglas.

The Institute's mission is to promote the understanding and appreciation of Estonian literature and the multilingual literary heritage of the Estonian area; to sustain and develop high-level humanities research discourse in Estonian; and to initiate and shape innovative research and development in written culture both locally and internationally. It conducts interdisciplinary basic research on Estonian-language and multilingual literature of the Estonian area from the Middle Ages to the present, placing it in the context of Baltic Sea region, European and world culture. The Institute leads Estonian and international research projects, participates in international research networks and organises scholarly events.

The Institute also owns and operates its museum building and garden at Väike-Illimari Street 12 in the Nõmme district of Tallinn. The house was the home of Marie Under and Artur Adson from 1933 to 1944, and of Elo and Friedebert Tuglas from 1944 to 1971. The museum preserves and studies the Institute's cultural collections and makes them available to researchers and the public. Since 1971, the Estonian Writers' Union, in cooperation with the Institute, has announced the two laureates of the annual Friedebert Tuglas short story award there each year on 2 March, Tuglas's birthday.

== History ==
The Institute of Language and Literature began work within the Academy of Sciences of the Estonian SSR on 1 January 1947. In 1970 the writer and academician Friedebert Tuglas bequeathed his property to the Academy of Sciences, wishing a research centre and museum to be established in his home. Tuglas had been a corresponding member of the Academy of Sciences since 1946 and remained so even during the harshest Stalinist years, when he was expelled from the Estonian Writers' Union he had helped to found, and lost the possibility of publishing his work. The Friedebert Tuglas House Museum, founded in 1971, opened to visitors on 2 March 1976.

In 1993 the house museum was renamed the Under and Tuglas Literature Centre, and in October of the same year the literature department of the Institute of Language and Literature merged with the Centre to form a new research institution, the Under and Tuglas Literature Centre of the Estonian Academy of Sciences. In 2025 it was renamed the Under and Tuglas Literary Institute. The Centre was headed by acting director Piret Kruuspere from 1993 to 1996, by Toomas Liiv from 1996 to 2001, and by the academician Jaan Undusk from 2000 to 2025.

== Governance and structure ==
The Institute is governed by a director and a scientific council, both elected for up to five years; it also has an international advisory board. Since 1 September 2025 the director has been Kristi Viiding.

The Institute consists of the Department of Early Literature, which studies the multilingual literature written in the Estonian area up to 1860 (in Latin, German, Estonian and other languages), and the Department of Modern and Contemporary Literature, whose main task is research on Estonian-language literature written since 1860 and the administration and study of the Institute's museum and cultural collections. From 2026 the Department of Early Literature is headed by Kaarel Vanamölder and the Department of Modern and Contemporary Literature by Merlin Kirikal.

== Collections ==
The Institute holds over 41,000 items of Tuglas's legacy — collections of his library, artworks, photographs and newspaper clippings, and memorabilia. The library of Under and Adson has been kept there since 1993. In 2007 the Estonian Cultural Fund in the United States donated its rare collection of exile art to the Institute, and in 2011 the Boston-based art and literary critic Paul Reets bequeathed his cultural-historical collection to it.

== Publications ==
The Institute publishes the research series Baltische Literarische Kultur (LIT Verlag — source publications, monographs and collected articles on the medieval and early modern literature of Estonia, Livonia and Courland), Collegium litterarum (literary-historical studies), oxymora (theoretical studies), the cultural-historical collections of the Under and Tuglas Literature Centre, the seminar series Moodsa eesti kirjanduse seminar (commented editions of key texts of Estonian literature), and Friedebert Tuglas's Collected Works (Kogutud teosed).

== See also ==
- Friedebert Tuglas short story award
