= Kalle Kurg =

Estonian writer, translator and editor

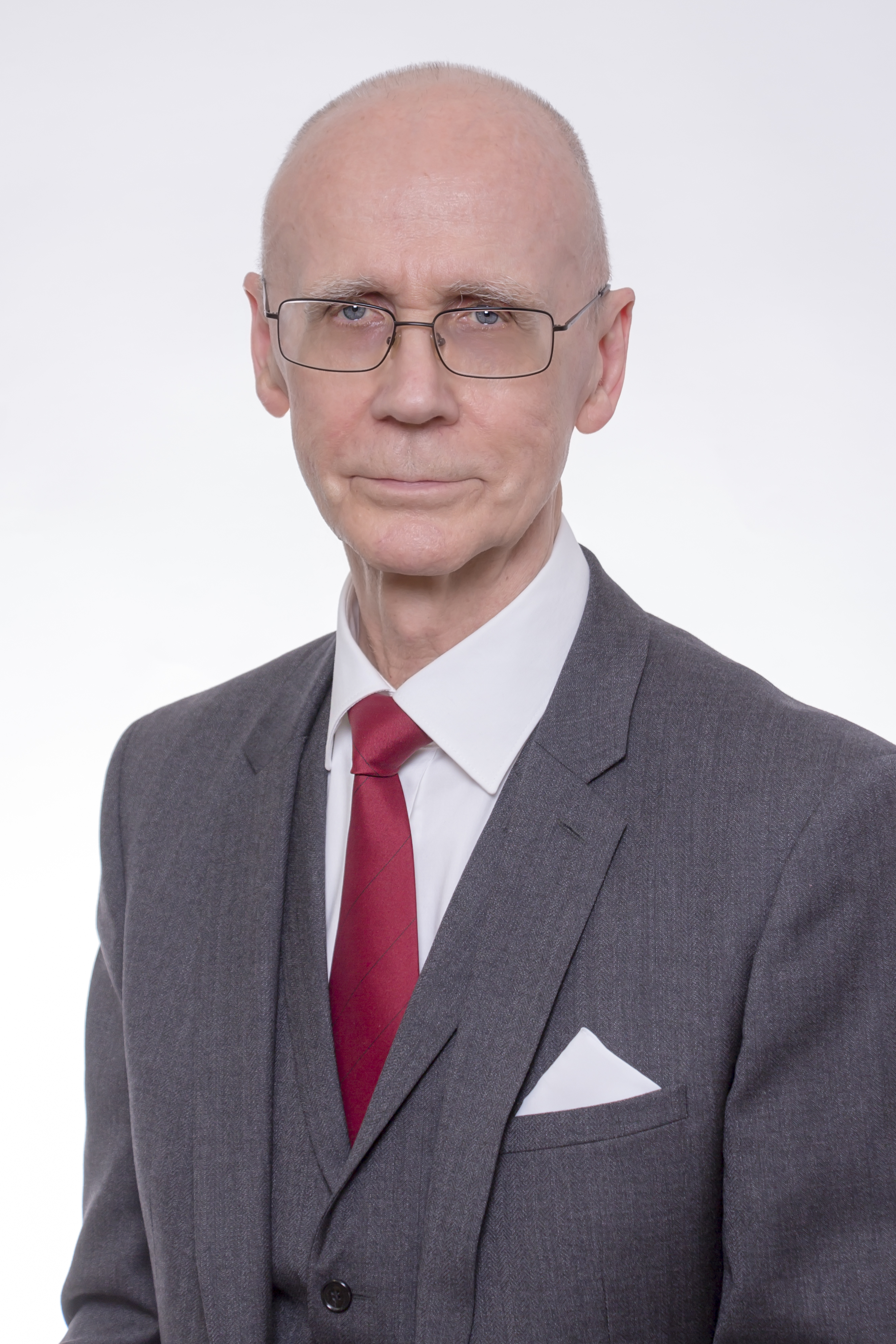
Kalle Kurg in 2017

Kalle Kurg (born 25 May 1942 in Tartu) is an Estonian poet, writer, critic, translator and editor. As a versatile figure in Estonian culture, he has also published caricatures and worked as a theatre director.

== Life ==
Kalle Kurg studied Estonian Philology at the University of Tartu (1961–1966) and soon became the Art Director of a nature publication called Eesti Loodus (Estonian Nature). Soon after he joined Eesti Televisioon (Estonian Television) as the Senior Director of art programs. In 1971 Kalle went on to work for a leading literary magazine first published in 1923 Looming (Creativity), of which he became Editor-in-Chief in May 1976. He remained in this position till January 1988. Kalle Kurg firmly stood by the magazine's democratic values and during the 70s and 80s Looming became the centre stage of expression for opposite elite; at the same time being enriched by various translations and essays from modern literature and science.

Kalle Kurg worked as the Executive Editor at the Estonian Association of Journalists between 1989 and 1991, and as the Director of the Department of Publishing at Eesti Televisioon between 1991 and 1992. In 1992 he founded a cultural magazine Sina ja Mina (You and Me), which was the first magazine that got published after Estonian Independence in 1991. Kalle was the CEO of several design agencies between 1992 and 1995, followed by the position of Director and Chief Editor of two publishing houses. He held these positions till 2000. Kalle Kurg is a member of the Estonian Writers' Union since 1975. In the 1960s and 1970s he was elected as the leader of Tartu and Tallinn Youth Writers Association. In the 1970s and 1980s he was also involved in broadening cultural exchanges between Estonia and foreign countries.

Since 2000 Kalle Kurg is a freelance writer and translator. As an essayist, Kalle has published several ecology related pieces in addition to literature, with initiative suggestions to change Estonia to a nature republic etc. Kalle Kurg also took part in shaping the citizens initiated Estonian Democracy Renewal (EDU or E-D-U) between 2005 and 2011.

== Works ==
In 1999, Kalle Kurg published a poetry compilation Colours of Darkness (Pimeduse värvid) which contains the mastery of poetry rooting to autobiography and documentaries. From one side it tells a person's story, from the other gives insights into the realities of Estonia from 1960 to 1990. The loss of freedom paved the way to tragic despair and hope of freedom, irony and dark humour, softened by the wait for freedom, human closeness and the subject of love as well as the problems of existence. From 1990 to 1993 and 2000 to 2005 Kalle Kurg wrote and broadcast original short stories at the Estonian Public Broadcasting stations, lastly with no breaks twice a month more than five years. The first seasons short stories covered the subjects of the atmosphere of a closed society, the second season covered the mental, ethical and spiritual problems of a newly independent state. These short stories have been broadcast as repeats series since.

As a literature critic, Kalle Kurg came out with a theory that differed from the official vision of literature in the 1970s. He highlighted the unity of the human motives in Estonian literature, but also showed that methods and forms of problem setting in Estonian literature can be divided between 4 centres. Presenting such a vision in 1973 went against the official theory of literature that emphasised the monolithicity of ideology and form. At the same time he has received several awards with his articles and essays.

In 1981 Kalle Kurg staged the first original modern dance-pantomime performance Mimeskid (Mimesques) in the history of the Estonian professional theatre. With its philosophical content and original presentation combined with innovative stage designs, the pantomime (original music by Sven Grünberg, Lepo Sumera) was awarded the highest prize at the International Pantomime Festival in Moscow in 1985. As an author of words staging, Kalle Kurg has stood out with experimental solutions in the way he handled classics.

Kalle Kurg has also translated poetry, novels, philosophical literature and informational literature from Finnish, English, German and Russian.

== Bibliography ==
- Kalle Kurg. Pimeduse värvid (Colours of Darkness) 1960–1990. Book design and graphics: Enno Ootsing. Publishing House: Virgela, Tallinn 1999. 254 p.
