= Jaan Undusk =

Estonian writer and literary scholar (born 1958)

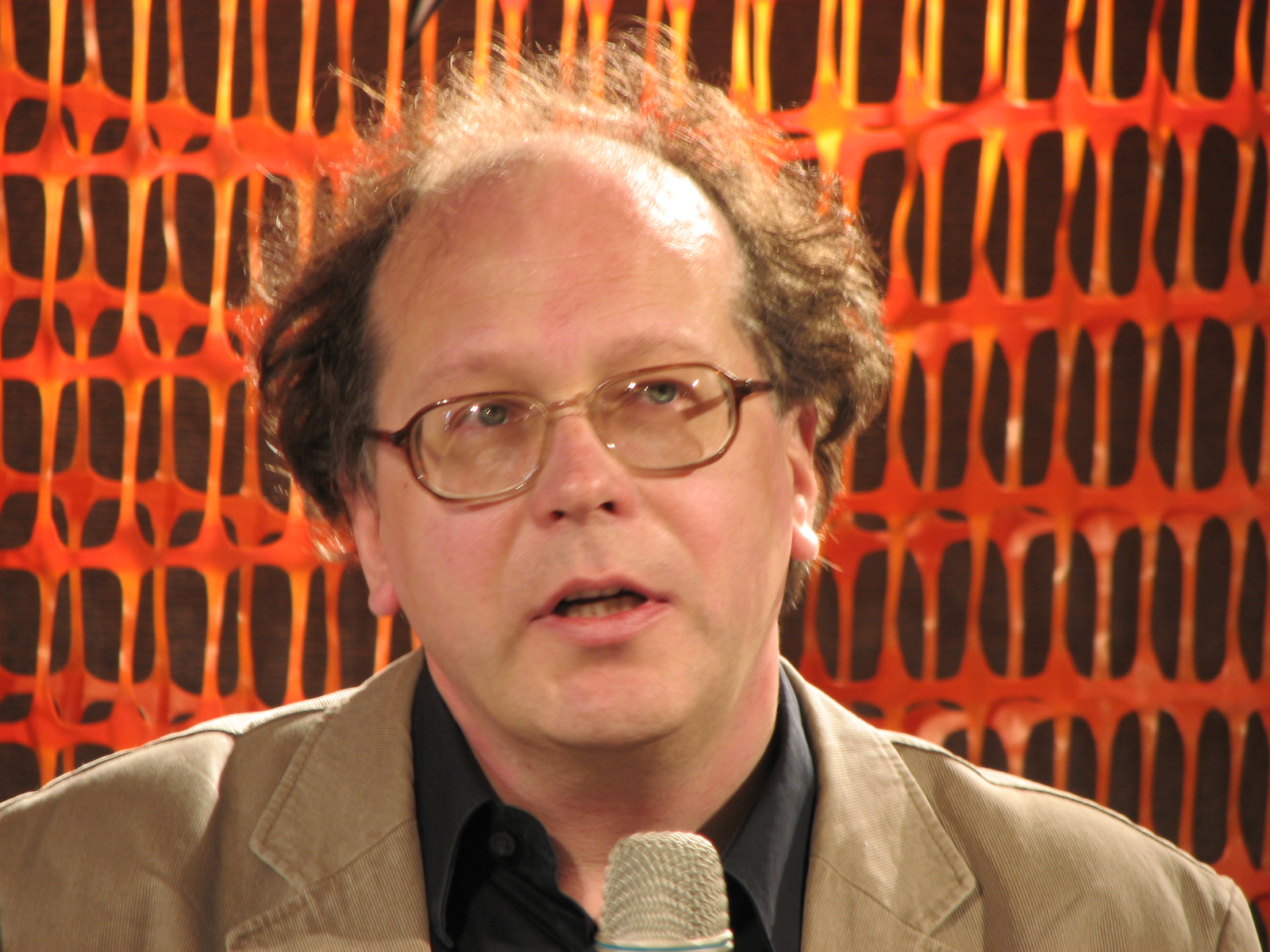
- Born: 14 November 1958 (age 67); Otepää, Valga County, then part of Estonian SSR, Soviet Union
- Occupations: Writer; playwright; literary scholar
- Writing career
- Notable awards: Friedebert Tuglas short story award (1987, 2003); Herder Prize (1995)

Jaan Undusk (born 14 November 1958) is an Estonian writer, playwright and literary scholar.

He has been the head of Under and Tuglas Literature Centre of the Estonian Academy of Sciences.

Since 1990, he is a member of Estonian Writers' Union. Since 2007, he is a member of Estonian Academy of Sciences.

== Awards ==
- 1986 and 2003 Friedebert Tuglas short story award (1986 and 2003)
- 1995 Herder Prize

== Works ==
- short story "Sina, Tuglas" (1987)
- novel "Kuum. Lugu noorest armastusest" (1990)
- play "Good-bye, Vienna" (1999)
- play "Quevedo" (2003)
- play "Boulgakoff" (2005)
