= Õpetajate Leht =

Estonian newspaper

- Publisher: Kultuurileht
- Founded: 1930
- Language: Estonian

Õpetajate Leht ('Educators' Newspaper') is an Estonian newspaper published by Kultuurileht. Before 2004, the newspaper was published by Perioodika.

First number was issued in 1930. During Estonian SSR, the newspaper was issued under the name "Nõukogude Õpetaja".
