= Täheke =

Estonian magazine

- First issue: 1960

Täheke is a children's magazine published in Tallinn, Estonia, by Kultuurileht SA.

Its first issue was published in January 1960. From 1960 to 2005, the magazine was published by Perioodika.
