= Ülo Mattheus =

Estonian writer, journalist, civil servant and editor (born 1956)

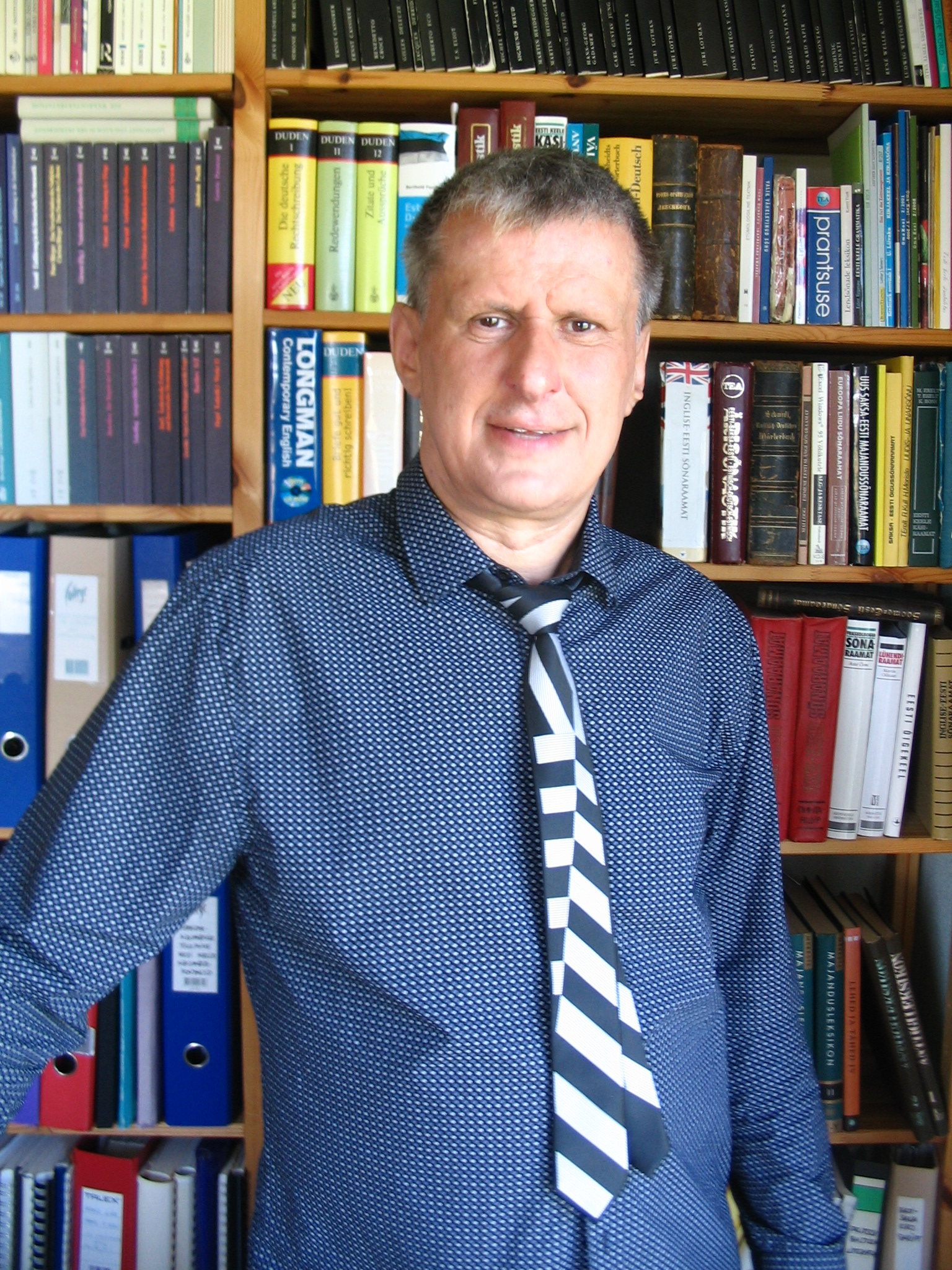
- Mattheus in 2013
- Born: 7 December 1956 (age 69) Tallinn, then part of Estonian SSR, Soviet Union
- Occupation: Writer; journalist; editor; civil servant
- Language: Estonian
- Notable works: Läheb ega peatu, India armastus

Ülo Mattheus (born 7 December 1956) is an Estonian writer, journalist, civil servant and editor.

== Early life and education ==
Mattheus was born 7 December 1956 in Tallinn. In 1975 he graduated from 32nd secondary school in Tallinn.

== Career ==
He has been transport worker, television lighting man, later also literary editor of the journal Sirp. From 2005 until 2013, he was a press consultant for the Riigikogu. Since 2014 he was the executive editor for TEA Encyclopedia.

Awards:

- 1985 and 1994: Friedebert Tuglas short story award
- 1996: Literature Endowment annual award

== Works ==
- 1989: novel "Kuma". Tallinn: Eesti Raamat, 1989. 164 pp.
- 1996: novel "Läheb ega peatu". Tallinn: Eesti Keele Instituut, 1996. 350 pp.
- 2006: novel "India armastus: fragmendid kirjadest". Tallinn: Eesti Keele Sihtasutus, 2006. 196 pp.
- 2013: novel "Tema salajane palve". Tallinn: Tuum, 2013. 208 pp.
