= Mari Saat =

Estonian writer

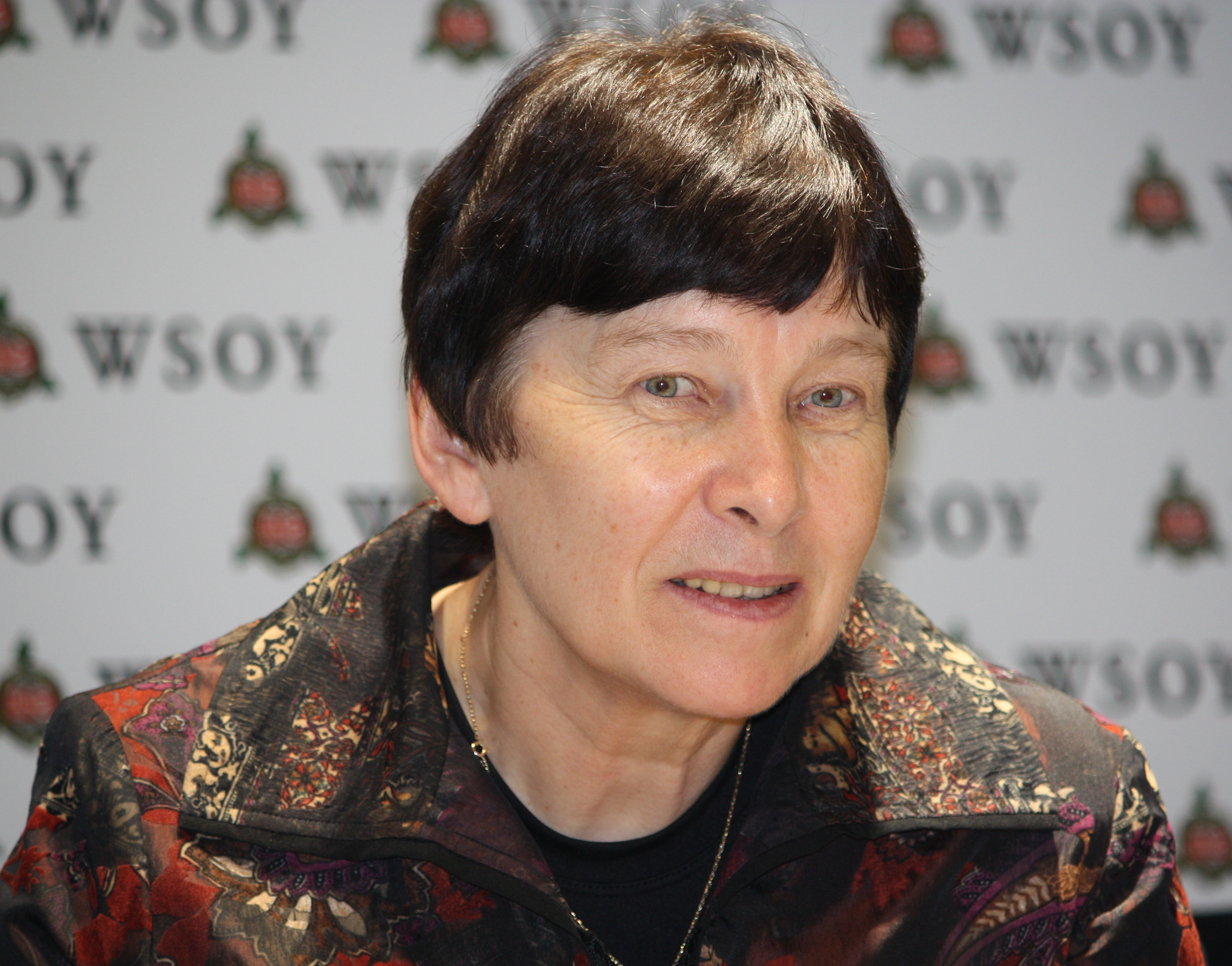
Mari Saat

Mari Saat (a.k.a. Mari Meel since 1975; born 27 September 1947 in Tallinn) is an Estonian writer.

In 1970, Saat graduated from the Tallinn Polytechnical Institute's faculty of economics. She holds a Doctorate in Economics.

Since 1976, she has been a member of the Estonian Writers' Union.

During the period of 1983–1993, she was a professional writer.

She is married to the artist Raul Meel.

She has served on the Press Council of Estonia (Pressinõukogu).

In 2024, she teaches Business Ethics at Tallinn University of Technology.

== Awards ==
- 1974 and 1985: Friedebert Tuglas short story award
- Estonian Cultural Endowment’s Prose Award in 1992, 1999 and 2008

== Works ==
- 1973: Katastroof
- 1978: What do we do about Mother?, 189 pp.
- 1980: novel Laanepüü. Tallinn: Eesti Raamat, 159 pp.
- 1985: Õun Valguses ja Varjus, 144pp.
- 1990: novel Võlu ja vaim. 1. raamat. Loomade ränded". Tallinn: Õllu, 140 pp.
- 2000: novel Sinikõrguste tuultes ... Tallinn: Varrak, 117 pp.
- 2008: novel Lasnamäe lunastaja. Tallinn: Tuum, 149 pp.
- 2009: Mina Ise, 42 pp.
- 2011: Päkapikuõpetus, 24 pp.
- 2014: Oakesed Kaunas (collection of short stories)
- 2015: Matused ja Laulupeod
