= Põldmäe =

Family name

Origin
- Language: Estonian
- Meaning: "mountain field"
- Region of origin: Estonia

Põldmäe is an Estonian surname derived the compound words põld ("field") and mäe ("hill/mountain").

As of 1 January 2022, 31 men and 30 women have the surname Põldmäe in Estonia. Põldmäe ranks 37,39th for men and 43,33rd for women in terms of surname distribution in the country. The surname Põldmäe is the most common in Lääne-Viru County, where 1.20 per 10,000 inhabitants of the county bear the surname. Notable people bearing the surname Põldmäe include:

- Alo Põldmäe (born 1945), composer, singer, music teacher, and researcher
- Asta Põldmäe (born 1944), writer and translator
- Jaak Põldmäe (1942–1979), literary scholar
- Mare Põldmäe (1955–2002), musicologist
- Rudolf Põldmäe (1908–1988), literary and folklore scholar
- Aino Põldmäe-Undla (1910–1992), literary historian
