= Tarmo Teder =

Estonian writer, poet and critic

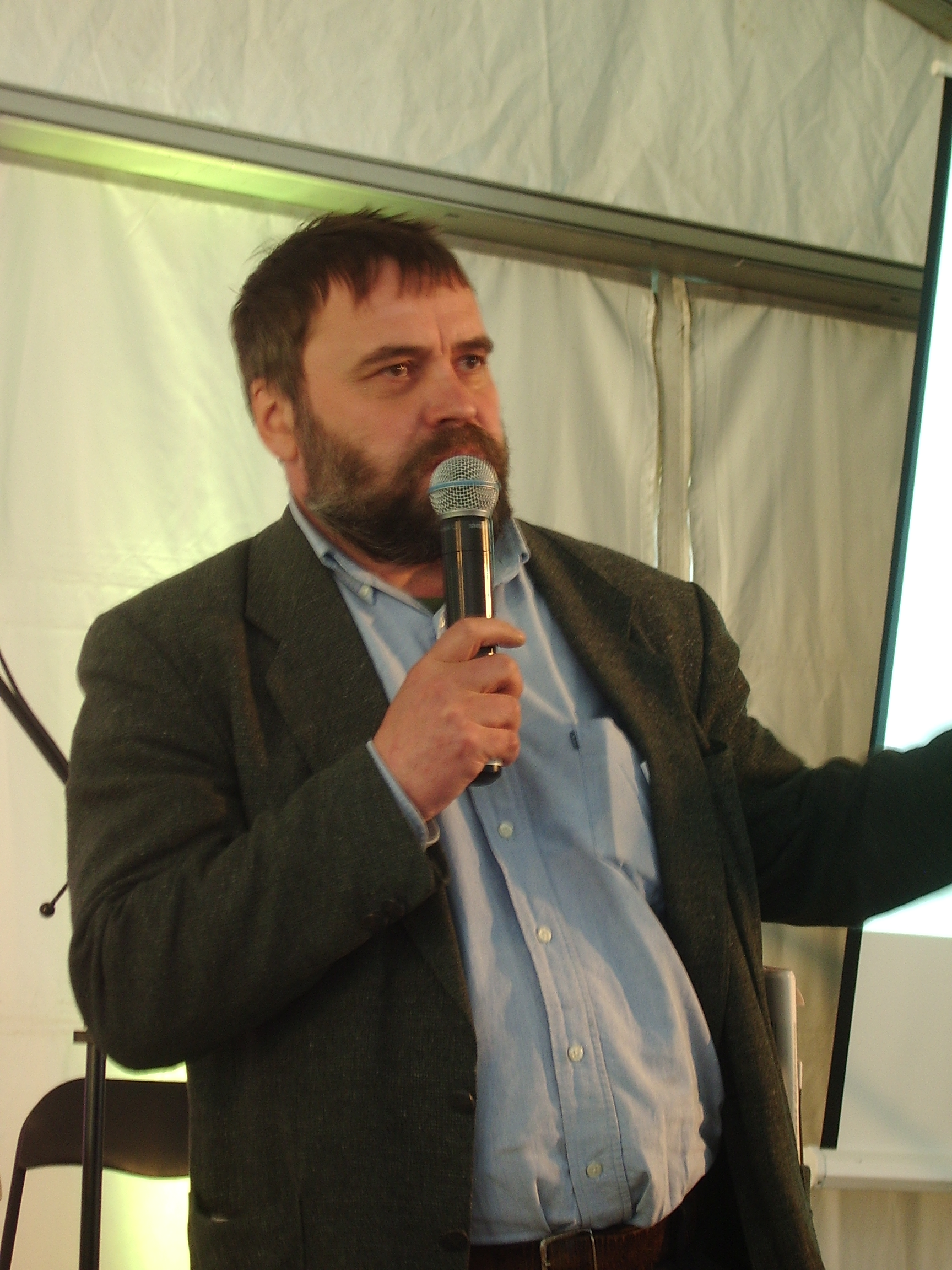
Tarmo Teder

Tarmo Teder (born 18 April 1958 in Kuressaare) is an Estonian writer, poet and critic.

Born on the island of Saaremaa, Teder studied from 1973–76 at the Tallinn Polytechnic and 1976–78 at Kingissepa, now Kuressaare. He began work in Tartu and Tallinn, as a boiler worker.

From 1994-95. Teder was the culture editor for Rahva Hääl (People's Voice) and from 1995–1998 as an editor at Eesti Päevaleht (Estonian Daily).

Teder is a member of the Estonian Writers Union.

Winner of the Friedebert Tuglas Award for his short story Viimase idealisti pildid (Pictures of the Last Idealist published in Looming no 6 2004).

== Works ==
- Onanistid ("The Onanists") (novel). Published by Tuum, 2006. pp. 223
- Pööningujutud ("Stories from the Attic") (short stories). Published by Eesti Keele Sihtasutus, 2002. pp. 256
- Kurat kargas pähe ("Bedevilled") (novel). Published by Eesti Raamat, 1995. pp. 180
- Tumedad jutud ("Dark Stories") (short stories). Published by Eesti Raamat, 1990. pp. 192
- Luurejutud ("Spy Stories") (short stories). Published by Eesti Keele Sihtasutus, 2004. pp. 184
- Jutte kambrist 27-1 ("Stories from the Chamber 27-1") (short stories). Published by Varrak, 2001. pp. 288
- Igemest ja abemest ("Of Gums and Beards") (essays). Self-published, 2008.
- Angerjapõõsa varjud ("Shadows of the Eel Bush") (poetry). Published by FC Boheem, 2001. pp. 70
