= Udo Uibo =

Estonian literary critic and linguist

Udo Uibo (born 5 May 1956 in Viljandi) is an Estonian literary critic, editor, translator and lexicographer.

From 1997 until 2005, he was the chief editor of Looming.

In 2001, he was awarded with Order of the White Star, V class.
