= August Jakobson =

Estonian writer and politician

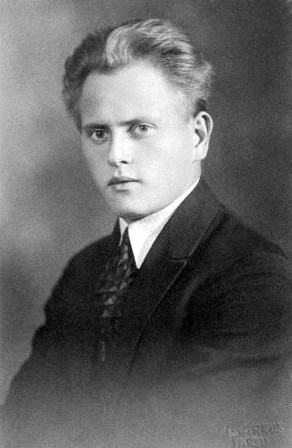
- Jakobson c. 1926
- Born: Augustin Jakobson; 2 September 1904; Pärnu, Estonia
- Died: 23 May 1963 (aged 58); Tallinn, then part of Estonian SSR, Soviet Union
- Occupations: Playwright, politician
- Years active: 1927 –1958

Signature
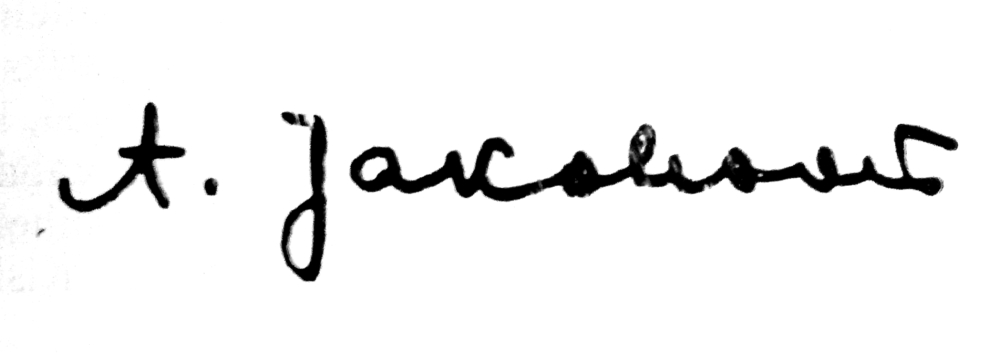

August Jakobson (2 September 1904 – 23 May 1963) was an Estonian writer and politician. He was one of the few Estonian playwright among his contemporaries whose plays were untouched by Soviet censorship and reached other Soviet states. He has been described as the leading Stalinist in Soviet Estonian drama. In the 1960s his work was described as "ideologically militant".

== Early life and education ==
Born Augustin Jakobson in Pärnu, he was the son of Mihkel Jakobson (1874–1951) and Maria Jakobson (née Moritson, 1876–1950). Jakobson graduated from school in 1926 in Pärnu, then studied economics at the University of Tartu from 1926 to 1929 and medicine from 1931 to 1935. However, he left school without acquiring a formal degree. His debut novel, Vaeste-patuste alev (1927), won the first place award in a literary competition sponsored by the publishing house Loodus.

== Career ==
He was the head of the Estonian Writers' Union from 1939 to 1940 and again from 1944 to 1946 (then known as the Writers' Union of the Estonian SSR).

From August 1940, Jakobson was a member of a Soviet censorship committee. From 1950 to 1958 he was the head of the Presidium of the Supreme Soviet of the Estonian Soviet Socialist Republic. Near the Endla Theatre in Pärnu stands a monument to Jakobson.

== Awards and recognitions ==
- 1950: Stalin Prize for literature
- 1951: Order of Lenin

== Bibliography ==
- Vaeste-patuste alev (1927) (novel)
- "Elu tsitadellis" (1946) (play)
- "Võitlus rindejooneta" (1947) (play)

== See also ==
- List of Chairmen of the Presidium of the Supreme Soviet of the Estonian Soviet Socialist Republic
