= Looming (magazine) =

Estonian magazine

Looming (English: Creation) is the oldest literary magazine in Estonia. The headquarters is in Tallinn.

== History ==
The magazine was established in 1923 by the Estonian writer Friedebert Tuglas. Its purpose was the publication and popularization of Estonian contemporary literature. Virtually all known Estonian authors have contributed to the journal.

During the Soviet occupation of Estonia, Looming was controlled by the Writers' Union of the Estonian Soviet Socialist Republic.

Currently, the publication of Looming is jointly funded by the Estonian Ministry of Culture, the State Kultuurkapital Foundation and the Estonian Writers' Union. The latter appoints the editor-in-chief of the magazine, who is responsible for the content. It is published monthly. The editorial office is based in Tallinn.

In the early years, the magazine's print run was around a thousand copies. In 1930, it was reduced from 1,500 to 1,200 copies. In 1933, the print run was 600 copies, but later began to increase and reached 5,500 copies by 1935. In 1955, this figure was 4,000, in 1977 – 19,000, in 1985 – 22,000. In the 1980s, when readers' demand for the magazine grew and the oppressive pressure of the authorities intensified, efforts were made to limit the influence of the free-spirited Looming with claims of insufficient printing capacity, which did not allow the magazine's circulation to increase. Looming was also removed from the international subscription list, so it could no longer be subscribed abroad, the justification being the claim that, in conditions of very high demand, there would be more readers of the magazine at home. In 1990, Looming had a print run of 35,500, 1992 – 6,000, 1995 – 2,400, 2000 – 2,100, 2004 – 1,700. Today, the print number is 1,600. The 1,000th issue of the magazine was published in December 2012.

== Editors-in-chief ==
The following persons have been editor-in-chief of the magazine:

- 1923–1926 Friedebert Tuglas
- 1927–1929 Jaan Kärner
- 1930–1940 Johannes Semper
- 1940–1941 Friedebert Tuglas
- 1941–1944 Journal not published due to World War II
- 1945–1946 Jaan Kärner
- 1946 Mart Raud
- 1946–1952 August Alle
- 1953–1957 Ilmar Sikemäe
- 1957–1960 Paul Kuusberg
- 1960–1968 Anton Vaarandi
- 1968–1976 Paul Kuusberg
- 1976–1987 Kalle Kurg
- 1988–1997 Andres Langemets
- 1997–2005 Udo Uibo
- 2005–2016 Mihkel Mutt
