= Puurmani manor =

Manor in Estonia

Coordinates: 58°34′30″N 26°17′23″E

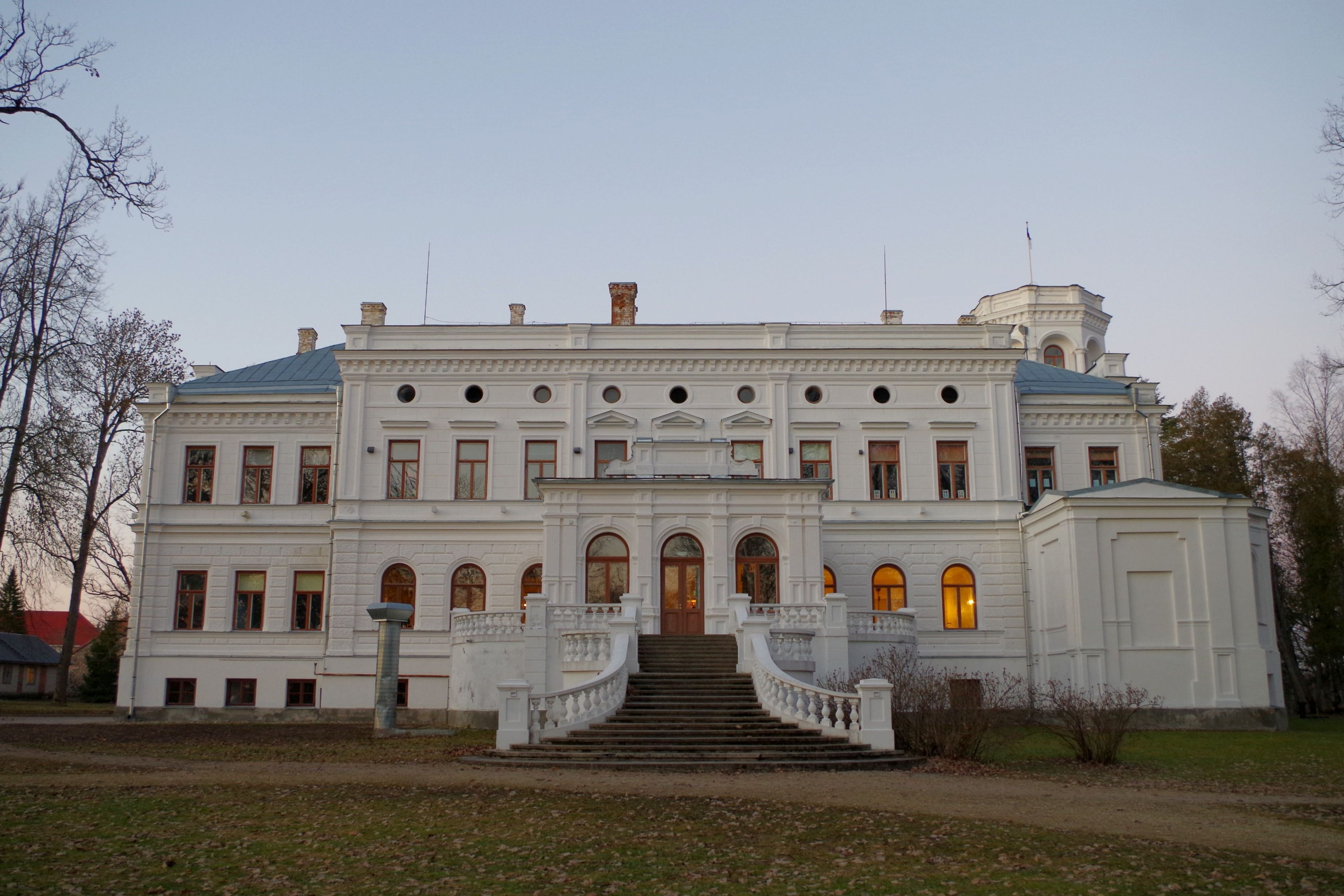
Main building of Puurmani manor

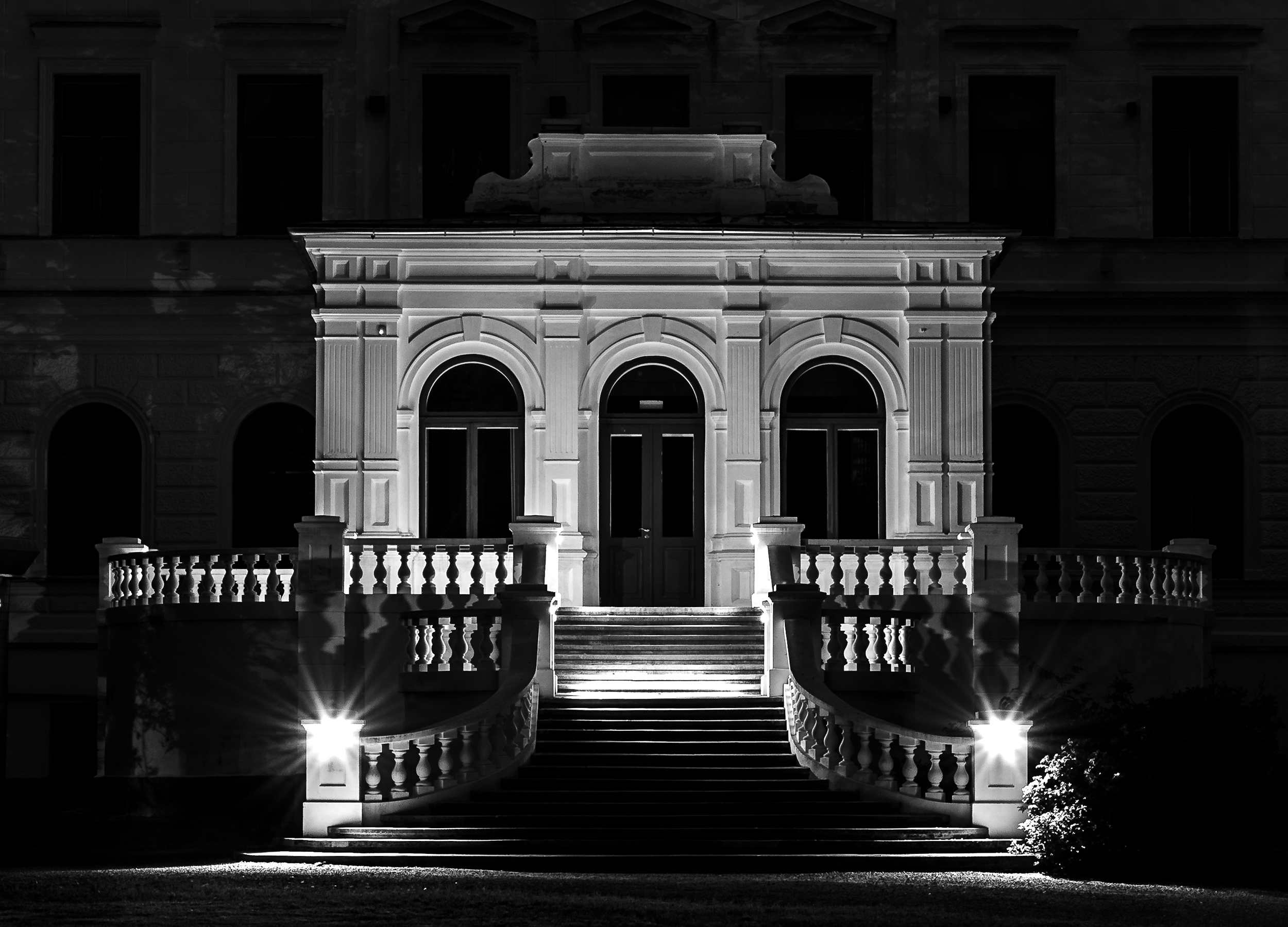
Puurmani manor at night

Puurmani manor (Estonian: Puurmani mõis) is a historical manor located in the village of Puurmani, Jõgeva County, Estonia. The manor is protected by the Estonian government as a cultural heritage object. The object was listed on 23 November 1999, and has the number 23988.

== History ==
The manor occupies the approximate place where a castle of the Teutonic Knights was located in the Middle Ages. The castle, known as Talkhof Castle (German: Schloss Talkhof) was built at the location where the road connecting Tallinn and Tartu crossed the Pedja River. The castle was in use between 1343 and 1560, after which it went into disrepair, and even the ruins were not preserved. In 1645, the estate where the castle was formerly located was given by Swedish Queen Christina to Buhrmeister family, hence the name of the locality.

The current building of the manor was constructed between 1877 and 1881 and is a palace in the Neo-Renaissance style. The main entrance to the estate was marked by the Tudor style gate. Around the manor, a landscape park is arranged, which is a combination of the French style symmetrically arranged park in front of the manor and the English style park at the back side.

In 1919, the manor, which at the time belonged to the von Manteuffel family, was nationalized, and since 1923 it hosts a school.

== See also ==
- List of palaces and manor houses in Estonia
