= Toomas Vint =

Estonian painter and writer

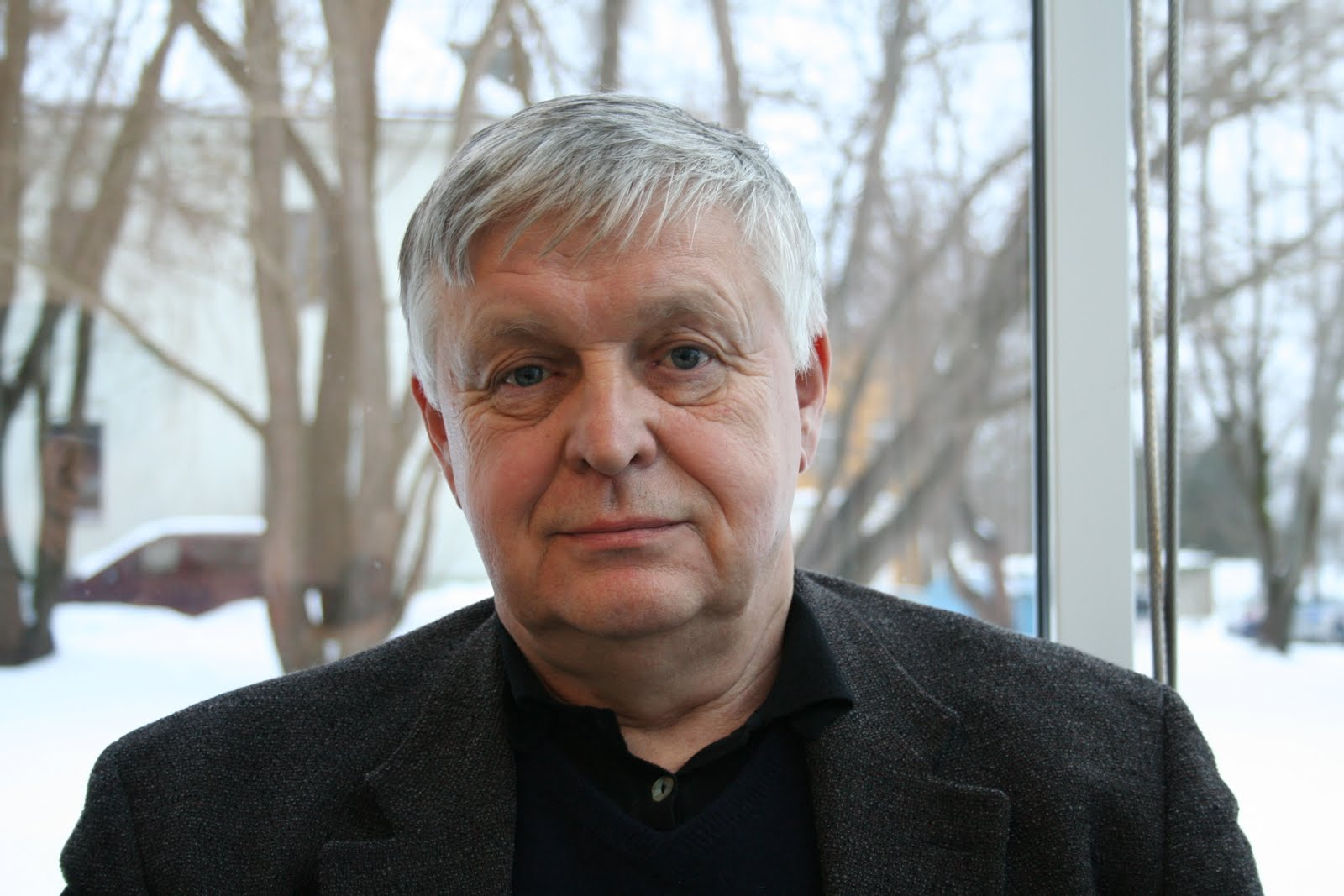
Toomas Vint

Toomas Vint (born 5 March 1944 in Tallinn) is an Estonian painter and writer. He has won the Friedebert Tuglas short story award twice, as well as the Estonian Prose Award.

== Awards ==
- 1986: Konrad Mägi Prize
- 2012: Order of the White Star, III class.

== Literary works ==
- Suitsupilvedes unistus [A dream in clouds of smoke] (poetry collection, 1968)
- Perekondlikud mängud [Family games] (short story, 1977)
- Kojamehe naine [Housekeeper's wife] (novel, 1990)
- Minu abielu prostituudiga [My marriage to a prostitute] (novel, 2003)
- Üüriline [Tenant] (novel, 2009)
- An Unending Landscape. Translated by Eric Dickens. Dalkey Archive Press, 2012. ISBN 978-1564787361
- The Sweepstakes of Love. Translated by Matthew Hyde. Dalkey Archive Press, 2016. ISBN 978-1564789471
