= Asta Põldmäe =

Estonian writer and translator

Asta Põldmäe (born 5 April 1944 in Puurmani, Tartu County) is an Estonian writer and translator.

She graduated from Tartu State University in journalism.

Since 1986 she has been the literary editor for the magazine Looming.

Since 1978 she has been a member of the Estonian Writers' Union.

Põldmäe made her earliest literary experiments in the early 1960s, publishing short stories, children's stories, and translations from Finnish and Russian. Her first book was the short story cycle "Me" published in 1977. Põldmäe's work, which includes both children's books and short stories aimed at adults, is dense in text and refined in form, with a lyrical-psychological undertone. Her works have been translated into Finnish, Swedish, Latvian, Lithuanian, Armenian, Kazakh, Chuvash, Tatar, Russian, Dutch, Spanish, German, and English.

Põldmäe received the Lifetime Achievement award for her "long-term short story writing" and her "legendary work in the magazine Looming" from the Cultural Endowment of Estonia.

== Awards ==
- 1979: Juhan Smuul Annual Literary Prize in the field of children's and youth literature
- 1983: Friedebert Tuglas Short Story Award
- 1995: Friedebert Tuglas Short Story Award
- 2021: Order of the White Star, Class V
- 2024: Lifetime Achievement Award in Literature from the Cultural Endowment of Estonia

== Works ==
- Me (Loomingu Raamatukogu, 1977, nr 1)
- Mitmekesi maateral (Eesti Raamat, Tallinn 1978)
- Linnadealune muld (Eesti Raamat, 1989)
- Sügisjooniku seeme (Eesti Raamat, 1989)
- Viini plika (Ilmamaa, Tartu 1999)
- Kirjad pääsukestele. Epistolaareleegia (Eesti Keele Sihtasutus, Tallinn 2009)
- Ja valguse armulise : kirjatöid aastaist 1975–2013 (Eesti Keele Sihtasutus, Tallinn, 2014)
