= Puurmani =

Village in Estonia

Coordinates: 58°35′N 26°17′E

- Small borough
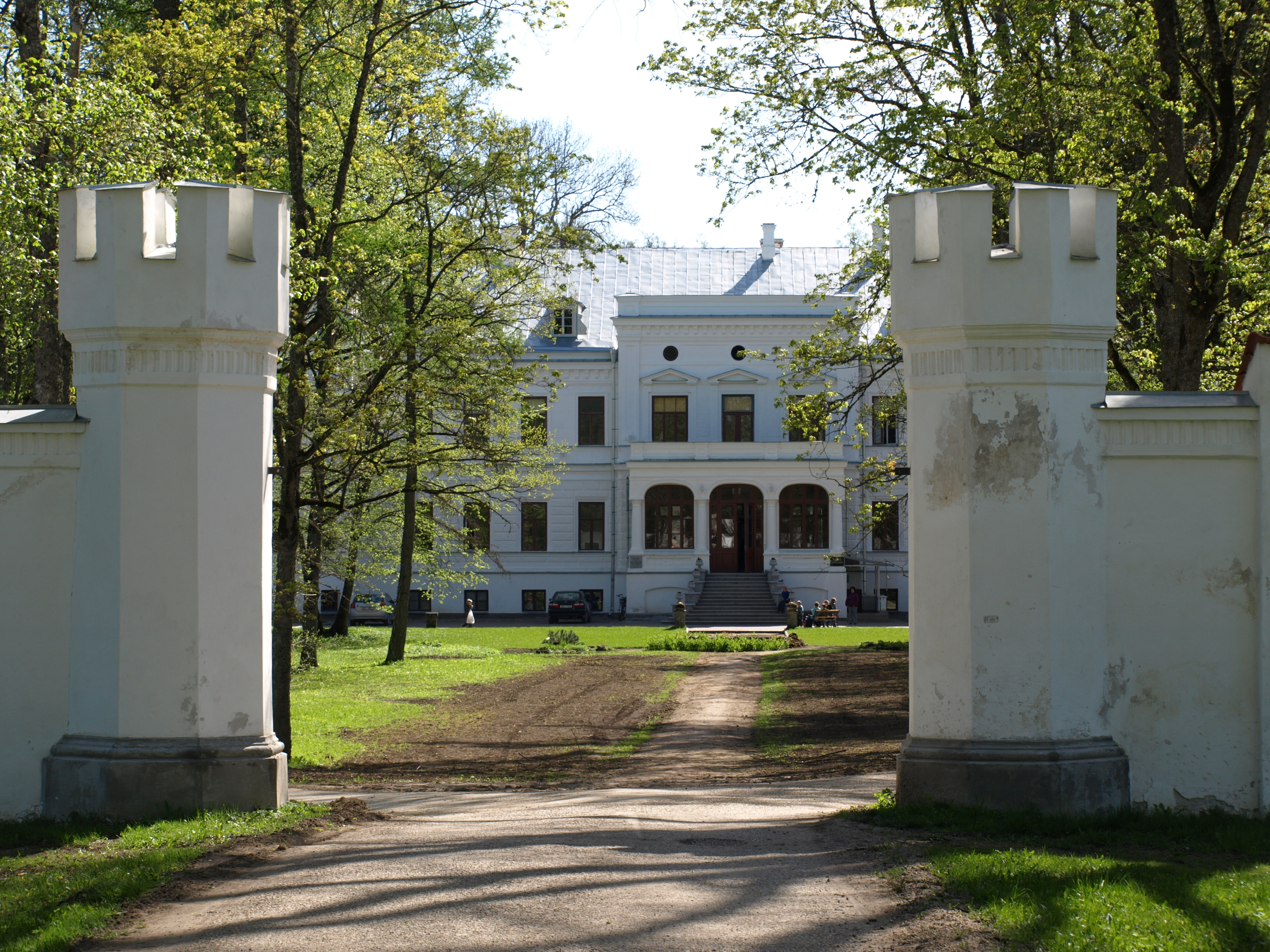
- Entrance and the main building of Puurmani Manor
- Interactive map of Puurmani
- Country: Estonia
- County: Jõgeva County
- Parish: Põltsamaa Parish

Population (2011 Census)
  - Total: 514
- Time zone: UTC+2 (EET)
  - Summer (DST): UTC+3 (EEST)

Puurmani is a small borough (Estonian: alevik) in Jõgeva County, Estonia, in Põltsamaa Parish. As of the 2011 census, the settlement's population was 514.

Some of Europe's last woolly mammoths inhabited the Puurmani area as recently as 10,000 BP.

Puurmani contains Puurmani manor, a historical manor recognized by the Estonian government as a cultural heritage object. It is currently occupied by a school.

== Notable people ==
- Asta Põldmäe (born 1944), writer and translator
