= Ilmar Sikemäe =

Estonian writer (1914–1998)

Ilmar Sikemäe (born as Helmut Bötker; 18 December 1914 Albu Parish, Järva County – 25 July 1998) was an Estonian writer.

1953–1957, he was the chief editor for the magazine Looming.

1945–1990, he was a member of CPSU.

His major work was the collection of sketches Kirjad Vargamäelt ('Letters from Vargamäe'), published in 1962.

== Works ==
- prose "Teekond jätkub". Tallinn: Eesti Riiklik Kirjastus, 1951
- prose "Näoga tuleviku poole". Tallinn: Eesti Riiklik Kirjastus, 1961
- collection of sketches "Kirjad Vargamäelt." Tallinn: Eesti Riiklik Kirjastus, 1962
- prose "Selged silmad". Tallinn: Eesti Raamat, 1967
- prose "Sada lugu". Tallinn: Eesti Raamat, 1969
- prose "Selged silmad". Tallinn: Eesti Raamat, 1984
- prose "Vasaku käe lood". Tallinn: Eesti Raamat, 1989
