= Ervin Õunapuu =

Estonian writer

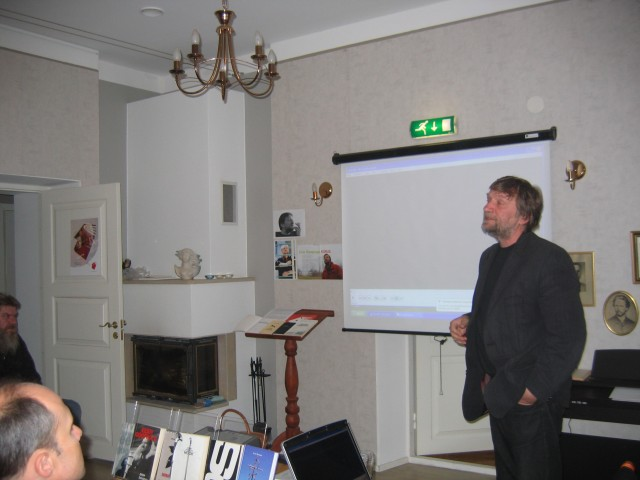
Ervin Õunapuu

Ervin Õunapuu (born 30 July 1956 in Käru, Rapla County) is an Estonian writer, playwright, stage designer and filmmaker.

1987–1990, he was the stage designer at Rakvere Theatre. Since 1990, he is a freelancer.

In 2000, he was awarded with Friedebert Tuglas short story award.

== Selected works ==
- novel "Olivia meistriklass" ('Olivia. Master Class'), FC Boheem 1996
- collection of short stories "Eesti gootika", Varrak 1999
- "Teie mälestuseks, kes iganes te olete ja kus asute", Umara 1999
- "Surmaminejad lasevad tervitada", Umara 2000
- "Väike palveraamat", Umara 2000
- "Mõõk", Umara 2002
- "Sinu teejuht ristiusku", Umara 2003
- "Eesti gootika II", Umara 2004
- "Öövöö", Sirp 2004
