= Andrei Hvostov =

Estonian journalist and writer

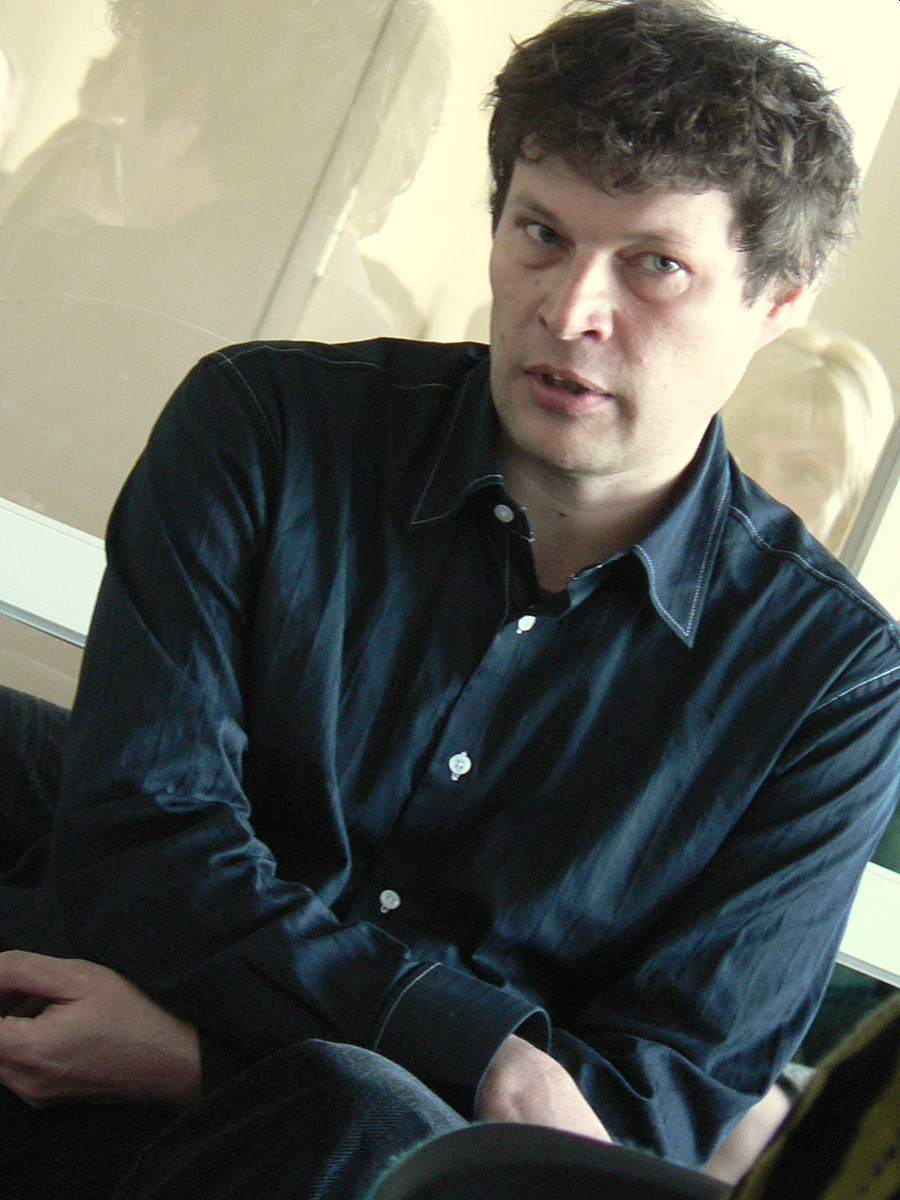
Andrei Hvostov (2008)

Andrei Hvostov (born 10 July 1963 in Jõhvi) is an Estonian journalist and writer.

In 1995 he graduated from University of Tartu, studied history.

As a journalist, he is worked mainly for Eesti Ekspress.

== Works ==
- 2004: novel "Lombakas Achilleus" ('Lame Achilles')
- 2011: novel "Sillamäe passioon" ('Sillamäe Passion')
- 2016: novel "Šokolaadist prints" ('The Chocolate Prince')
