= Paul Kuusberg =

Estonian writer (1916–2003)

Paul Kuusberg (30 April 1916 – 21 January 2003) was an Estonian writer and journalist. Novellas by him include "Roostetanud kastekann" (1971) and "Võõras või õige mees" (1978), which won an award in Estonia.

== Biography ==
Kuusberg was born in Reval, and during the period of Estonia's independence worked as a construction worker. He supported the 1940 Soviet occupation of Estonia and joined the Communist Party. He participated in the German-Soviet war, first in a Soviet Destruction battalion, later in the Red Army's 8th Estonian Rifle Corps. Kuusberg served as a politruk and journalist at the front.

After the war, he worked for the newspaper Rahva Hääl and was later the editor-in-chief of Looming. Kuusberg graduated from the Higher Party School in Moscow.

From 1976 to 1983 he was the secretary of the board of the Writers Union of the Estonian SSR. Although his first works of fiction (The Walls (1957)) closely follow the guidelines of socialist realism, he soon adopted a more multifaceted, undogmatic approach. He treated careerism in Soviet society (The Case of Andres Lapateus), the fate of the Estonian soldiers mobilized to the Red Army (Enn Kalmu kaks mina (1960–61)). Both of the novels were also adapted for film. Paul Kuusberg was a communist, but as a literary functionary, he tried to protect Estonian literature and literati from ideological suppression.

Paul Kuusberg died in 2003.
