= Mudlum =

Estonian writer (born 1966)

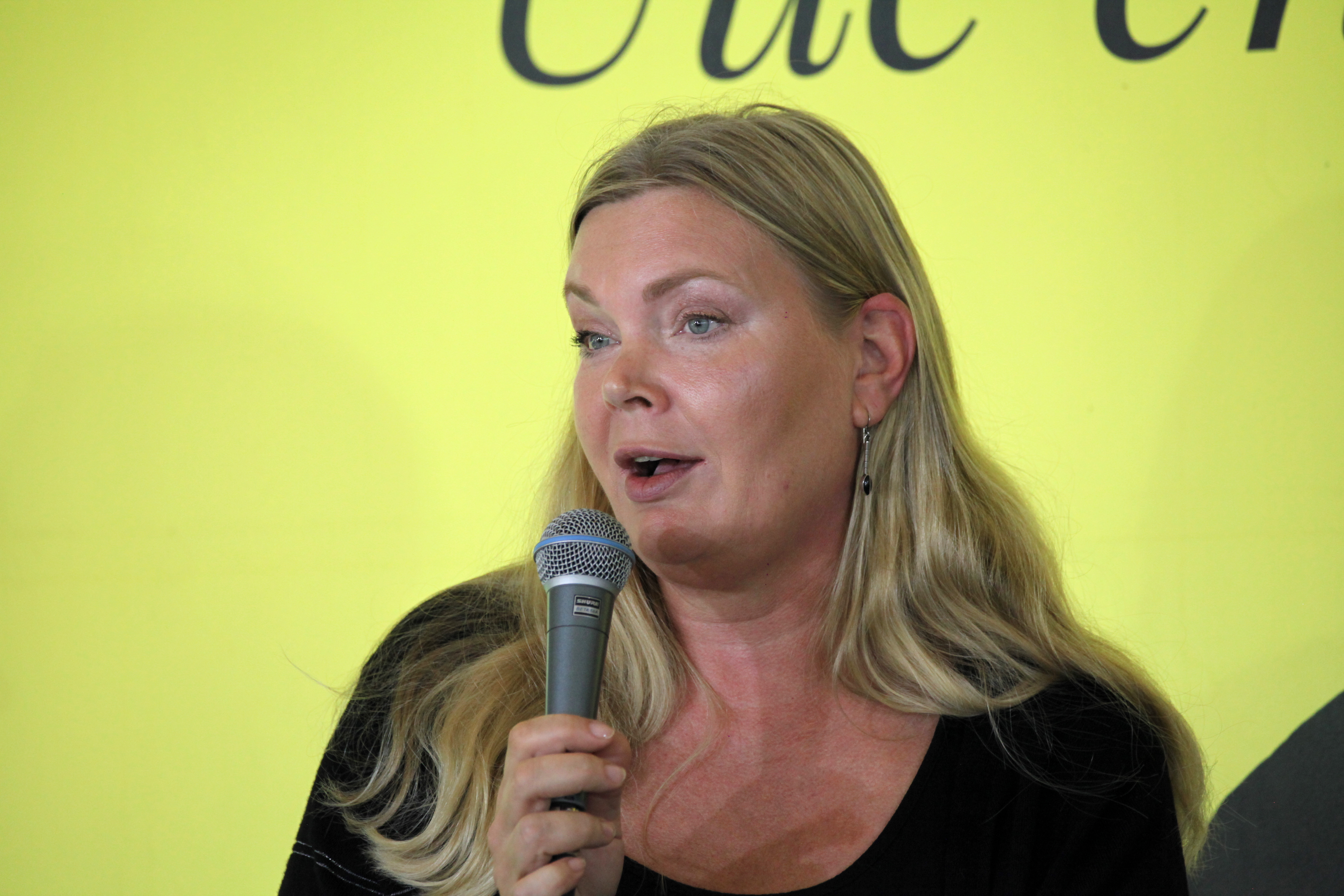
Mudlum at the Opinion Festival 2021 in Paide, Estonia

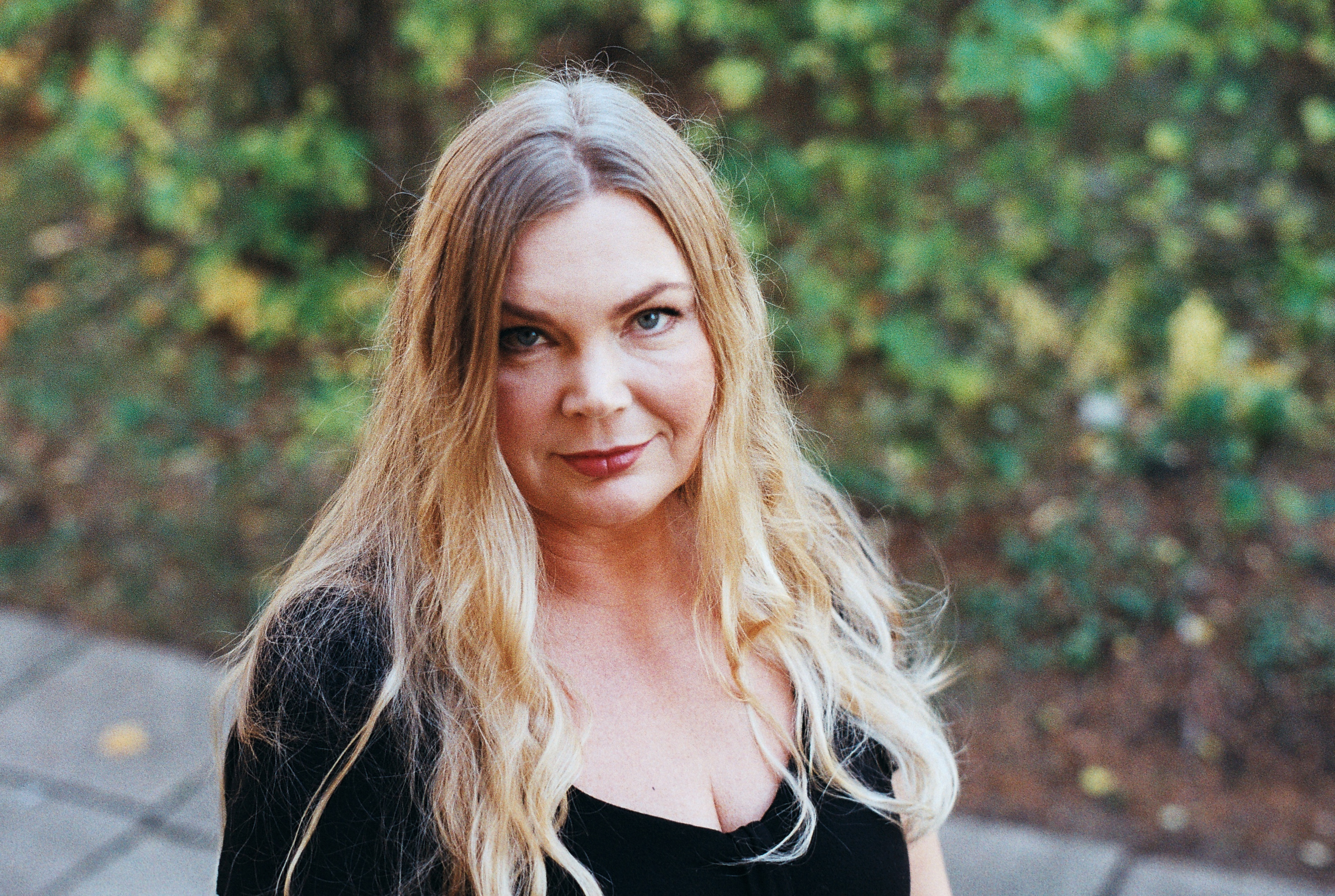
Mudlum

Mudlum (born Made Luiga; 31 July 1966) is an Estonian writer and literary critic.

She studied at the Estonian Humanitarian Institute (Eesti Humanitaarinstituut) and the Estonian Academy of Arts (Eesti Kunstiakadeemia).

She is also a well-known literary critic. Her essays have been published in the volume Ümberjutustaja (The Narrator, Elusamus, 2017). She was a member of the defunct cultural association ZA/UM. Several of her books are based on her memories placed at the Muhu island where her maternal ancestral home is situated. She is the first writer in history to receive the Estonian Cultural Endowment annual prose prize two years in a row.

== Selected works ==
- Mitte ainult minu tädi Ellen (Not Just My Aunt Ellen, Strata, 2020), which is centered on the late life and relations of Mudlum's aunt Ellen, the mentally ill partner of the Estonian communist writer Juhan Smuul.
- Poola poisid (Polish Boys), Strata, 2019 (winner of the EU Prize for Literature), the events depicted in the book are loosely based on the development of the ZA/UM cultural movement which later went on to publish the acclaimed computer RPG Disco Elysium.
- Linnu silmad (Bird Eyes, Eesti Keele Sihtasutus, Tallinn, 2016).
- Ilus Elviira: burleskne jutustus (Beautiful Elviira: A Burlesque Story, Eesti Keele Sihtasutus, Tallinn, 2015)
- Tõsine inimene (A Serious Person, ZA/UM, Tallinn, 2014)
