= P. I. Filimonov =

Russian-Estonian writer

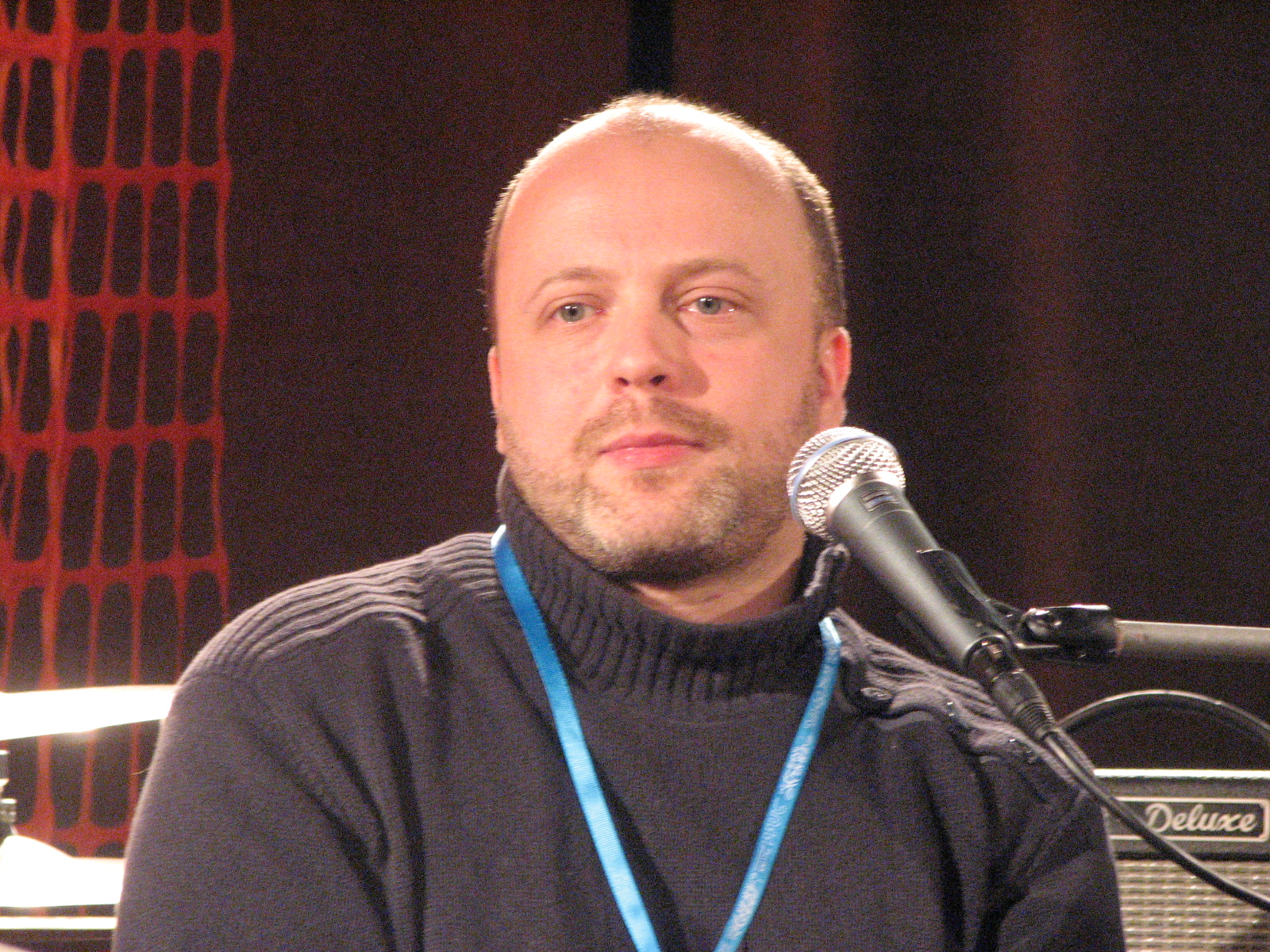
P. I. Filimonov

P. I. Filimonov (real name Roman Fokin; born on 4 March 1975) is a Russian-Estonian writer who lives in Estonia.

== Selected works ==
- 2010: novel "Mitteeukleidilise geomeetria tsoon"
- 2011: poetry collection "Väärastuste käsiraamat"
- 2013: novel "Thalassa, Thalassa!"
