= Shwmae Sumae Day =

Day of celebration for the Welsh language

Shwmae Sumae Day (Welsh: Diwrnod Shwmae Sumae) is a day marked each year in Wales to celebrate and promote the Welsh language. Shwmae and Sumae are informal greetings used in the south and the north respectively to start a conversation. The day is celebrated on 15 October each year in order to promote community use of the language and encourage non-Welsh speakers to consider learning the language.

== Development ==
The day was held for the first time in 2013, and has been held every year since. Shwmae Sumae Day events are organised at grassroots level by individuals, organisations and schools, and co-ordinated by civic Welsh language umbrella group Dathlu'r Gymraeg. The day is promoted through 'champions' appointed each year, many of whom have learned Welsh as adults themselves. Schools and other educational institutions play an active role in the day creating videos and promoting the day on social media.

== Philosophy ==
The aim of Shwmae Day is to encourage non-Welsh speakers to start every conversation in Welsh, using Shwmae, Sumae, or a local variation. It is also seen as a way of increasing awareness about the language among non-Welsh speakers, encouraging new people to start learning the language. A recurring theme is that the Welsh language belongs to all Welsh citizens and that everyone can contribute to its future vitality.
