= Lauri Pilter =

Estonian writer and literary scientist

Lauri Pilter (2016)

Lauri Pilter (also known as Larats Pilter; born 15 October 1971 in Tallinn) is an Estonian writer, translator and literary scientist.

Lauri Pilter won the Friedebert Tuglas award for literature in 2004 for his short story "The Double", and the Betti Alver award for the best first novel for his work Lohejas pilv (A Dragonish Cloud).

A PhD student at Tartu University, Pilter's Master's thesis, "Southern Gothic: The Development of the Depiction of Violence and Spiritual Degeneration in the Works of William Faulkner and Cormac McCarthy", was also at Tartu University in 2004.

His translations into Estonian include two novels by Philip Roth, The Border Trilogy by Cormac McCarthy, the chapter "Waiting for Glory" from the novel The Web and the Rock and the novella The Lost Boy by Thomas Wolfe, and Life on the Mississippi by Mark Twain.
