= Keel ja Kirjandus =

Estonian magazine

- Language: English

Publication details
- History: 1958–present
- Publisher: Kirjastus Periodika
- Frequency: Monthly

Standard abbreviations
- ISO 4: Keel Kirjand.

Indexing
- ISSN: 0131-1441
- LCCN: 61039299
- OCLC no.: 1084288018

Links
- Journal homepage

Keel ja Kirjandus (Language and Literature) is a journal published in Estonia by Kultuurileht SA. The journal is compiled by the Estonian Academy of Sciences and the Estonian Writers' Union.

The first issue was published in 1958. The journal is issued once per month.
