= Vikerkaar =

Estonian magazine

- Frequency: 12 per year
- First issue: 1986

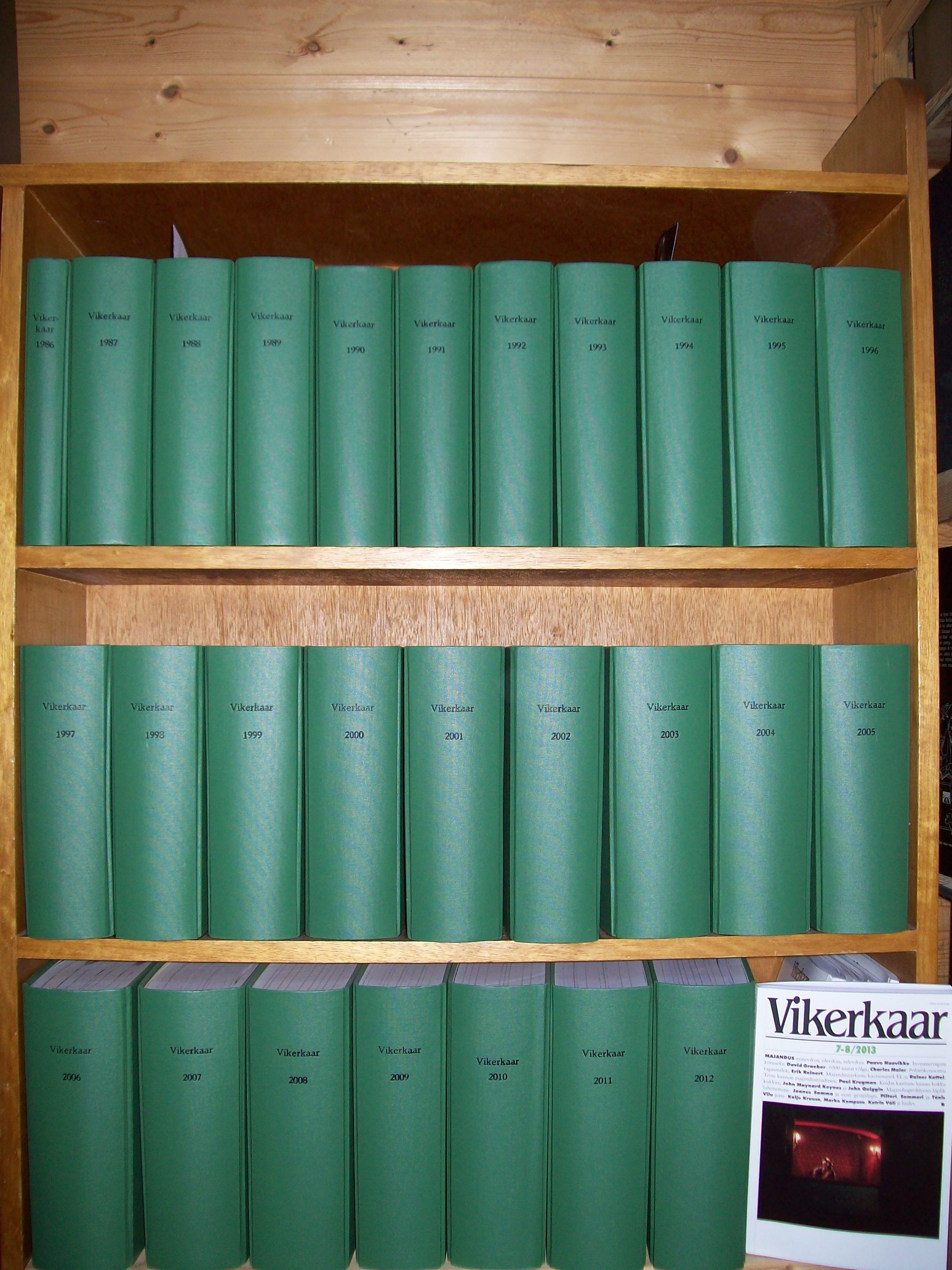
Annual sets of Vikerkaar (as of 2013)

Vikerkaar ('rainbow' in Estonian) is an Estonian magazine published in Tallinn, Estonia by Kultuurileht SA. The magazine focuses on Estonian literature.

First number was issued in 1986.

1986-2006 was also issued Russian version of Vikerkaar. The magazine was called Радуга.
