= Tiit Aleksejev =

Estonian novelist and playwright (born 1968)

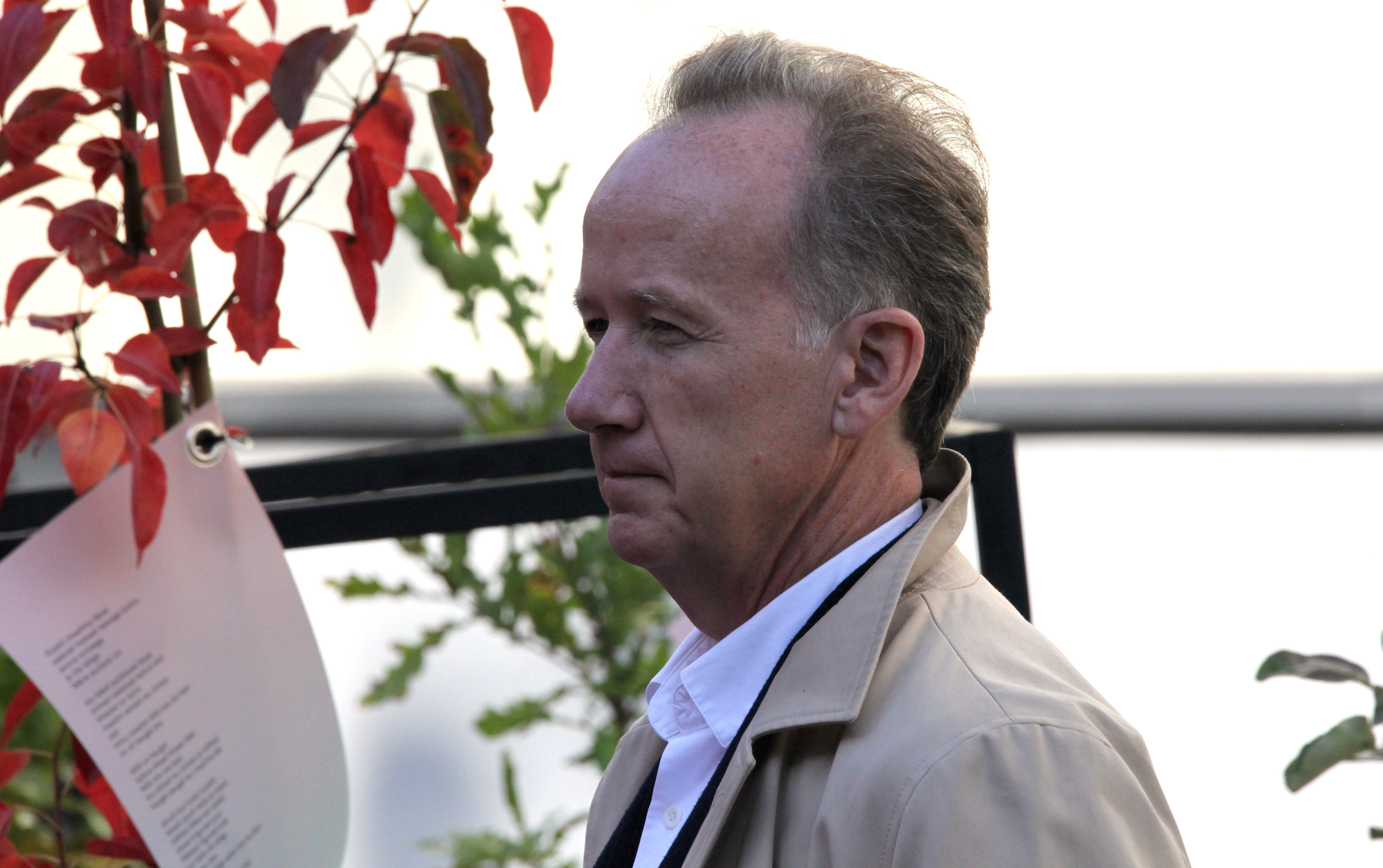
- Tiit Aleksejev at the annual Literary Street festival 2021 in Tallinn, Estonia
- Born: 6 July 1968 (age 58); Kohtla-Järve, Estonia
- Education: University of Tartu
- Occupations: novelist and playwright
- Notable work: Valge kuningriik (The White Kingdom), Palveränd (The Pilgrimage), Kindel linn (Stronghold)
- Awards: Betti Alver literary award, EU Prize for Literature, Virumaa Literary Award

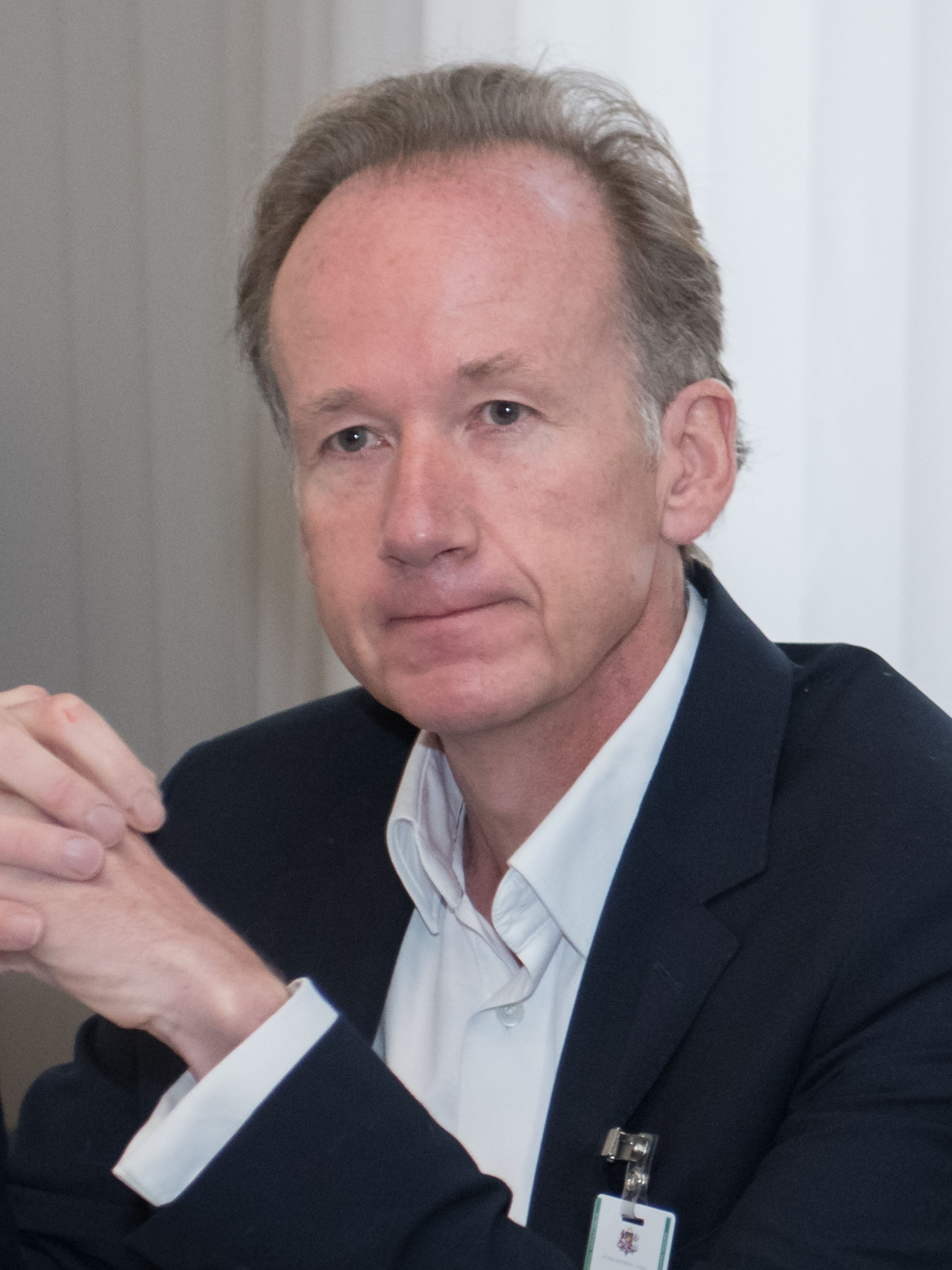
Tiit Aleksejev in 2018

Tiit Aleksejev (born 6 July 1968) is an Estonian novelist and playwright.

Aleksejev was born in Kohtla-Järve. He studied history at the University of Tartu, and served as a diplomat in France and Belgium.

His debut novel was a thriller called Valge kuningriik (The White Kingdom, 2006). It won the Betti Alver literary award for best first novel. His second novel was a work of historical fiction, set in the time of the First Crusade. This novel called Palveränd (The Pilgrimage, 2008) won the EU Prize for Literature and was translated into several languages subsequently (e.g. Italian, Hungarian, and Finnish). In 2011, he published a third novel Kindel linn (Stronghold). Palveränd and Kindel linn are the first and second part of what is to become a trilogy.

His first play Leegionärid (Legionaries), about the fallen soldiers of the Estonian Legion, appeared in 2010 and premiered in 2013 in Rakvere. It received the Virumaa Literary Award in 2011. Another historical play, Kuningad (Kings) was published in 2014 and is about the murder of the four Estonian kings during the St. George's Night Uprising (1343).

Aleksejev lives in Tallinn.
