= Sirp =

Estonian newspaper

- Editor-in-chief: Kaarel Tarand
- Language: Estonian
- Sister newspapers: Diplomaatia
- Website: www.sirp.ee

Sirp (lit. 'sickle'; formerly Sirp ja Vasar, 'sickle and hammer') is a newspaper published in Estonia. It mostly publishes articles on culture: art, literature, music, film, theatre, and architecture; also articles on sciences and social issues. From 1994 to 1997 the newspaper was issued under the name Kultuurileht (lit. 'cultural newspaper').

In 2006–2007 the paper carried an insert titled Kirp (lit. 'flea').
