= Estonian Writers' Union =

Organization based in Estonia

The Estonian Writers' Union (Estonian: Eesti Kirjanike Liit), abbreviated as EWU, is a professional association of Estonian writers and literary critics.

== History ==
The Estonian Writers' Union was founded on 8 October 1922 under the name Eesti Kirjanikkude Liit at the 3rd Congress of Estonian writers held at the Tallinn Town Hall. One of its founding members was the poet Anna Haava. On 27 April 1923, the union began the publication of the monthly magazine Looming (English: Creation), which is one of the most important literary magazines in Estonia. In 1927, the union expanded to Tartu with the opening of a branch there.

With the Soviet occupation of Estonia, the Estonian Writers' Union was dissolved on 19 October 1940. The occupation authorities launched the Estonian Soviet Writers' Union (Estonian: Eesti Nõukogude Kirjanike Liit), on 8th or 9 October 1943 in Moscow, Soviet Union. From 1958, it was called Writers' Union of the Estonian SSR (Estonian: Eesti NSV Kirjanike Liit) and was active until the end of the Soviet Union.

During the German occupation of Estonia during World War II from 1941 to 1944, the original Estonian Writers' Union unofficially continued its work. In 1945, the International Estonian Writers' Union (Estonian: Välismaine Eesti Kirjanike Liit) was founded in Stockholm, Sweden as the organization of exiled Estonian writers as a counter organization to the Estonian Soviet Writers' Union/Writers' Union of the Estonian SSR.

With the restoration of Estonian independence came the restoration of free expression and press freedom in Estonia, the association in Estonia was renamed Estonian Writers' Union in 1991. The International Estonian Writers' Union merged with the Estonian Writers' Union in October 2000.

Currently, the Estonian Writers' Union has 302 members (as of July 2007). Its headquarters is located in the Old Town of Tallinn and has a branch in Tartu. Estonian Writers' Union also has a summer house in Käsmu on the Baltic Sea, which is regularly made available for domestic and foreign writers.

== Chairmen ==
=== Estonian Writers' Union ===
- Friedebert Tuglas (1922–1923, 1925–1927, 1929–1930, 1937–1939)
- Karl Rumor (1923–1924)
- Eduard Hubel (1924–1925, 1930–1936)
- Henrik Visnapuu (1927–1929)
- August Jakobson (1939–1940)
- Albert Kivikas (1941–1943)
- Gustav Suits (1943–1944)
- Vladimir Beekman (1991–1995)
- Mati Sirkel (1995–2004)
- Jan Kaus (2004–2007)
- Karl Martin Sinijärv (2007–2016)
- Tiit Aleksejev (since 2016–2024)
- Maarja Kangro (2024–)

=== International Estonian Writers' Union ===
- August Mälk (1945–1982)
- Kalju Lepik (1982–1999)
- Enn Nõu (1999–2000)

=== Estonian Soviet Writers' Union/ Writers' Union of the Estonian SSR ===
- Johannes Vares-Barbarus (1943–1944)
- August Jakobson (1944–1946, 1950–1954)
- Johannes Semper (1946–1950)
- Juhan Smuul (1954–1971)
- Vladimir Beekman (1971–1976, 1983–1991)
- Paul Kuusberg (1976–1983)

== Literature ==
Ülo Tuulik (eds): Eesti Kirjanikkude Liit 75, Tallinn 1997 Katrin Raid: Loomise lugu. Eesti aeg. Eesti Kirjanikkude Liit 1922–1940. Tallinn 2002
