= Asko Künnap =

Estonian journalist and writer (born 1971)

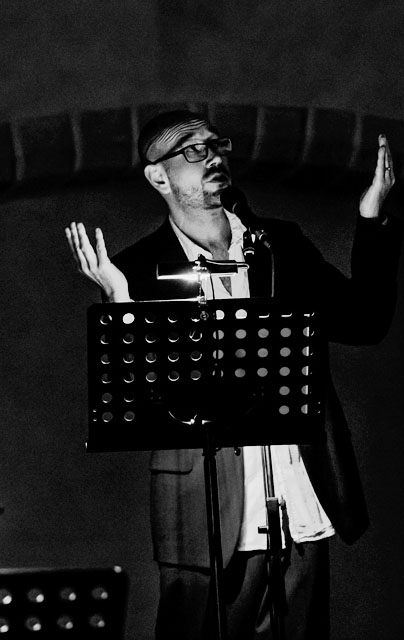
Asko Künnap performing at St. Nicholas’ Church in Tallinn, 25 February 2016

Asko Künnap (born 6 September 1971) is an Estonian designer, writer, and artist.

== Education ==
Asko Künnap attended Miina Härma Gymnasium (1978–1989) and the Tartu Children's Art School (1980–1984). He graduated from the Estonian Academy of Arts in product- and graphic design (1989–1995), and studied interior architecture at the Oslo National Academy of the Arts (1991–1992).

== Career ==
Künnap has worked as a freelance illustrator and designer (1992–1994) as well as creative director at the advertising agencies ZOOM Ogilvy (1994–2003) and Rakett (2003–2014). He has received numerous nominations and prizes in competitions including the Effie Awards and the Estonian Golden Egg Competition.

== Works ==
=== Design ===
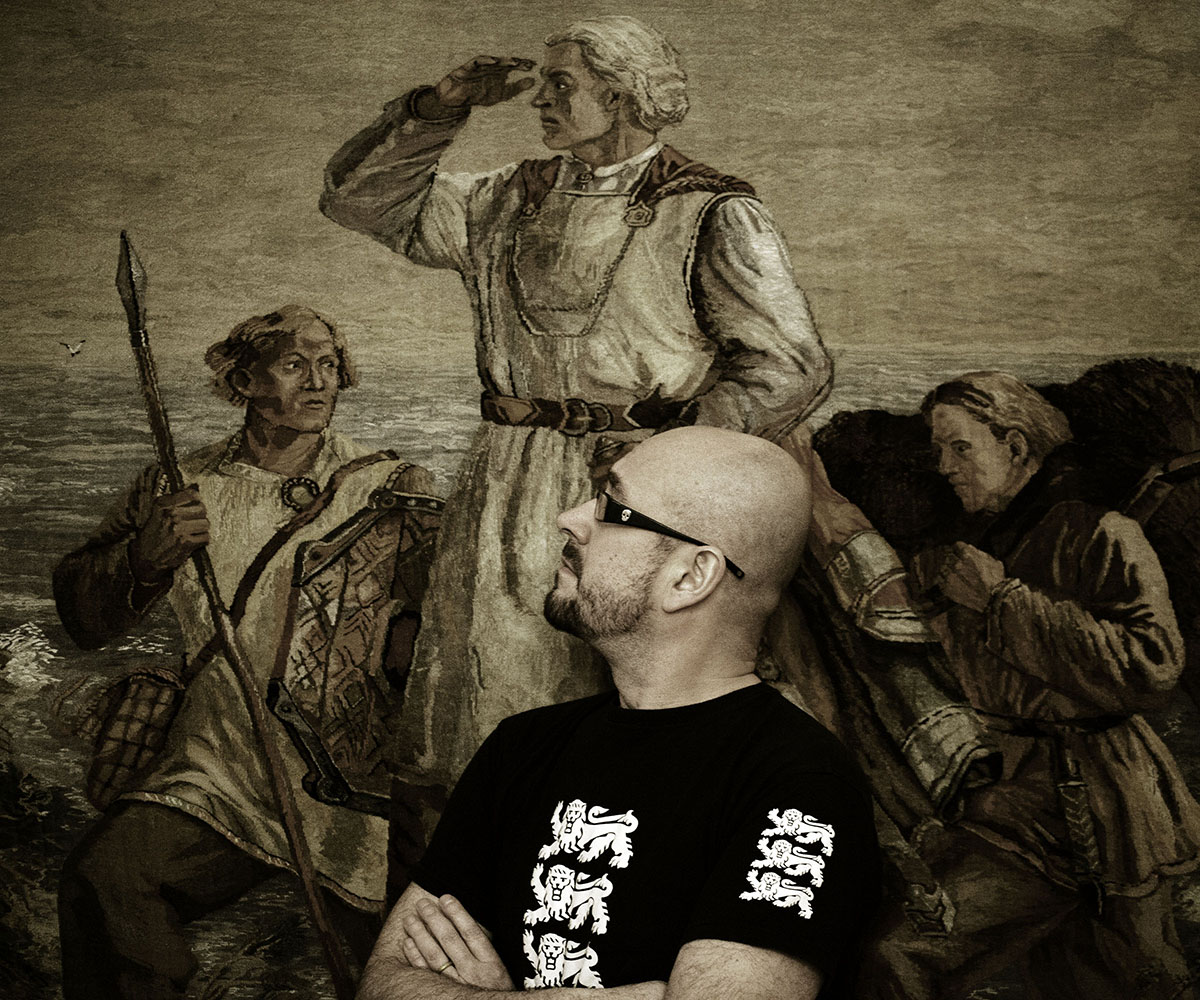
Asko Künnap wearing a T-shirt with his winning design for the standard logo now used by the Republic of Estonia and its government ministries. 22 February 2014

Künnap has designed logos and corporate identities for customers including the Republic of Estonia and all its national ministries (2013); the Estonian national parks of Lahemaa, Matsalu, Vilsandi, Soomaa, and Karula (2014); the online news portal Delfi (1999); the Estonian Literature Information Center (2002); the ABCD Baltic Defense Conference (2010); the National Library of Estonia (2016); Tallinn Science Park Tehnopol (2010), Hendrikson & Ko (2015); and others.

He has designed album covers for Dagö, Lauri Saatpalu, Tõnis Mägi, Villu Veski, Rein Rannap, The Johansons, Jaan Tätte, Tiit Kikas, Jäääär, JääBoiler, InBoil, Siim Aimla, Eepiline Eesti Orkester, Svjatra Vatra, Liisi Koikson, Sven Grünberg, Urmas Alender, Ruja, Bonzo, Kõrsikud, Aapo Ilves, Tõnu Timm and Jaanus Nõgisto, Concerto Contore, Pantokraator, Dynamite Vikings, and others.

In collaboration with Estonian writer and musician Jan Kaus, Künnap developed the concepts for Estonia's booths at the 2007 Gothenburg Book Fair and the 2011 Helsinki Book Fair. He has also designed theater sets with Iir Hermeliin and Heigo Ervin Seppel.

Künnap has designed and illustrated books for a wide range of publishers in Estonia (Tänapäev, Pegasus, Näo Kirik, Kite, Verb, Maarjamaa, Mustvalge, GO, Tallinn University Press, Kultuurileht, etc.), Finland (Arktinen Banaani, Robustos, and Savukeidas), as well as for the Firenze Contemporary Jewellery School Alchimia, the Italian Ministry of Foreign Affairs, and others. He has received close to a dozen prizes in the annual Best-Looking Estonian Book Awards and was awarded the Prize for Best-Looking Baltic Book at the Riga Book Fair.

He is a member of the Estonian Graphic Designers’ Association.

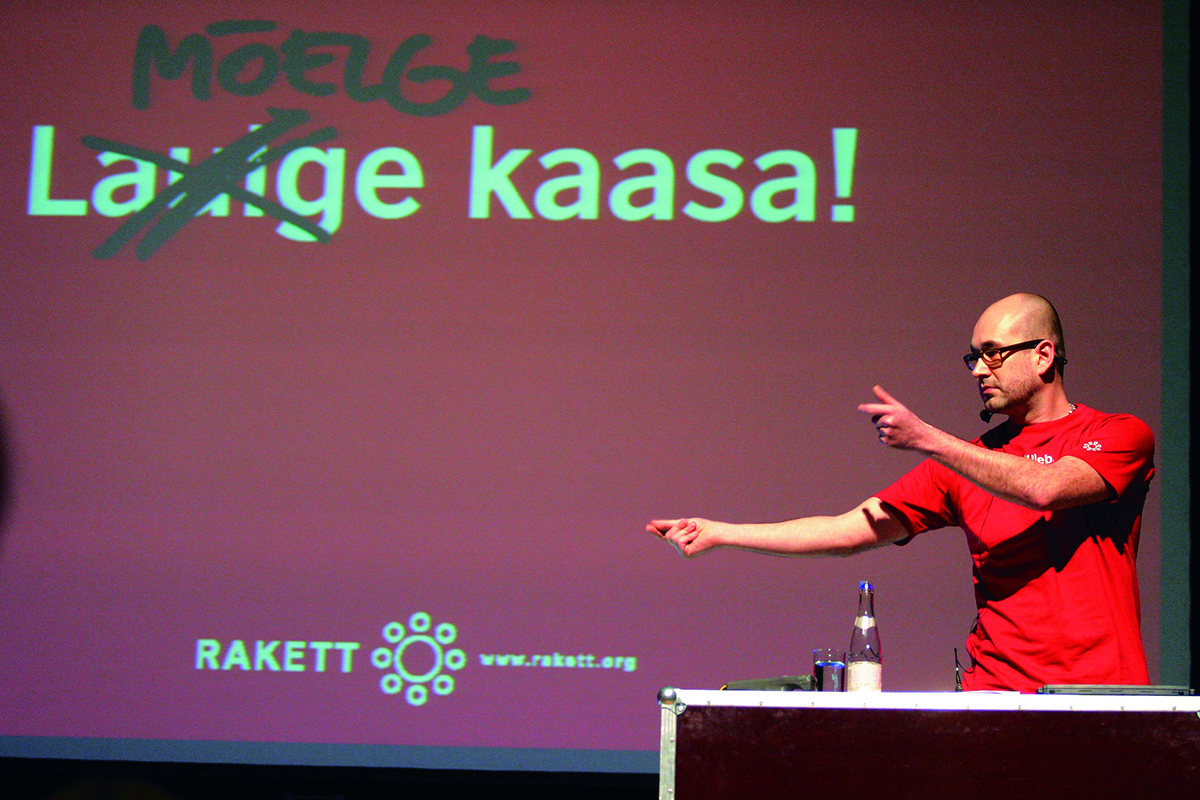
Asko Künnap presenting his ad campaign “Whoever Dies With the Most Toys Wins”. National EFFIE Award, 1995

=== Literature ===
Künnap has written, designed, and published poetry: Pimeduse vastu (Against the Darkness, 1999); Kokkusattumuste kaitseks (In Defence of Coincidences, 2000); Ja sisalikud vastasid (And the Lizards Replied, 2003); Kõige ilusam sõda (The Most Beautiful War, 2004); Su ööd on loetud (Your Nights Are Numbered, 2008); Mardikate määraja (A Field Guide to Beetles, 2011) and Mälestused (Memoirs, 2011). His poetry has also appeared in joint collections with Estonian poets Karl Martin Sinijärv, Jürgen Rooste, Triin Soomets, Jan Kaus, Maarja Kangro, and Elo Viiding. Künnap received the Cultural Endowment of Estonia's Annual Prize for Poetry in 2003, the Estonian National Culture Fund's Debut Prize in 2003, and the Looming Literary Magazine's Annual Prize in 2016. He is a member of the Estonian Writers' Union and the Estonian PEN Club.

Künnap's poetry has been translated into and published in English, German, French, Italian, Hungarian, Slovenian, Serbian, Romanian, Arabic, Dutch, Norwegian, Swedish, and Finnish. Examples include A Fine Line – New Poetry from Eastern & Central Europe (Arc Publications, UK 2004), Tra ansia e finitude – La Nuova Europa dei poeti (Istituto Italiano di Cultura di Budapest, HU/IT 2005), and New European Poets (Graywolf Press, US 2008). Hannu Oittinen received the 2015 Cultural Endowment of Estonia's Annual Prize for Translated Literature for his translation of Künnap's Su ööd on loetud into Finnish – Yösi ovat luetut (Nidottu, 2015).

Künnap has performed at a multitude of literary and music festivals, including the Edinburgh Festival (UK), the Cheltenham Festival (UK), the Ledbury Poetry Festival (UK), the Young Euro Classic (Berlin), Transpoesie (Brussels), Medana (SI), Vilenica (Ljubljana, SI), Baltoscandal (EE), HeadRead (EE), Prima Vista (EE), Jazzkaar (EE), and elsewhere. He has participated in poetry tournaments in the US, the UK, Germany, and Finland; and has performed at the Gothenburg, Helsinki, Turku, and London book fairs.

Künnap's publishing house Näo Kirik primarily prints contemporary Estonian poetry, including works by authors Hasso Krull, Karl Martin Sinijärv, Jürgen Rooste, Elo Viiding, Triin Soomets, Jan Kaus, Vahur Afanasjev, Veronika Kivisilla, Kaur Riismaa, Kristiina Ehin, Maarja Kangro, Lauri Saatpalu, Hannu Oittinen, and Liina Tammiste.

Künnap has written reviews on film, literature, and art for newspapers and cultural magazines.

He has translated poetry into Estonian from English, German, and Finnish, and was nominated for the Cultural Endowment of Estonia's Annual Prize for Translated Literature in 2012.

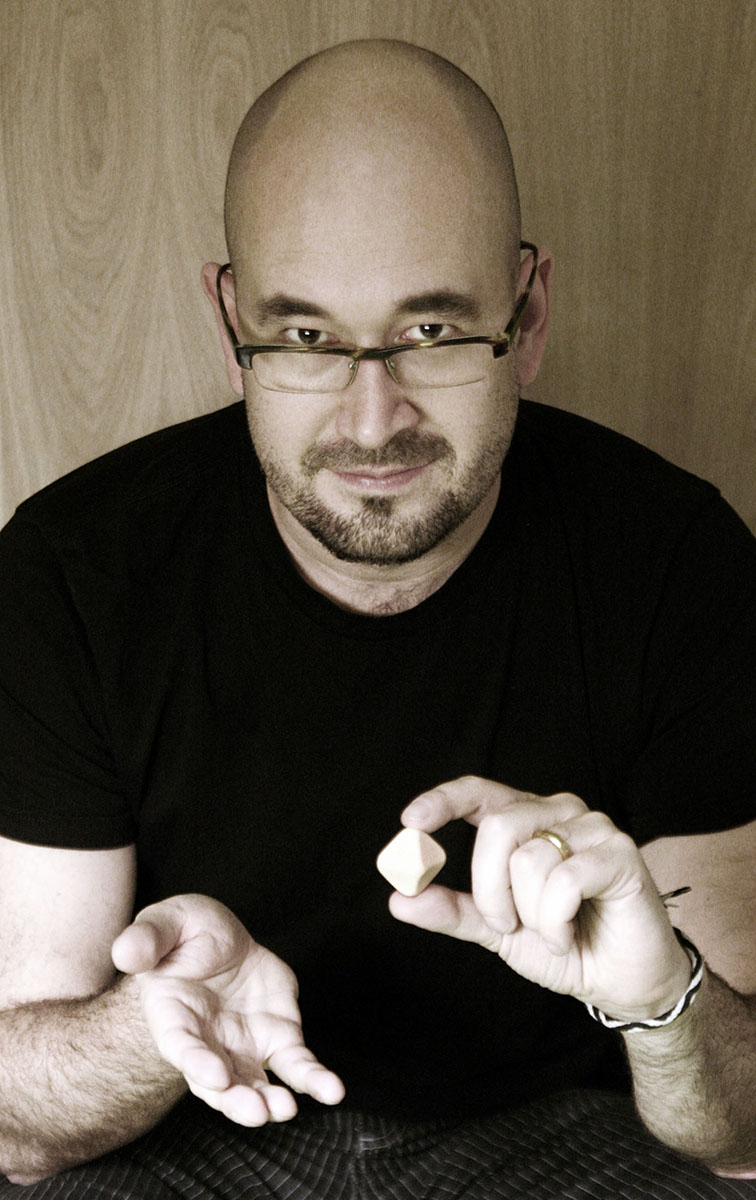
Asko Künnap. 2009

=== Visual Art ===
Künnap has done works of photography, video, oil painting, silk printing, pencil drawing, digital graphic art, and digital collage. His art has been displayed in the solo exhibitions “Pimeduse vastu” (“Against the Darkness”; Tartu, Tallinn; 1998); “Kokkusattumuste kaitseks” (“In Defence of Coincidences; Tallinn, Pärnu, EE; 1999); “Seni parimad” (“The Best So Far”; Riga, LV; 2000); “Sõnade ja sõnumite testimine” (“Testing Words and Messages”; Visby, SE; 2005); and “Su ööd on loetud” (“Your Nights are Numbered”; Tallinn, Tartu, EE; 2008).

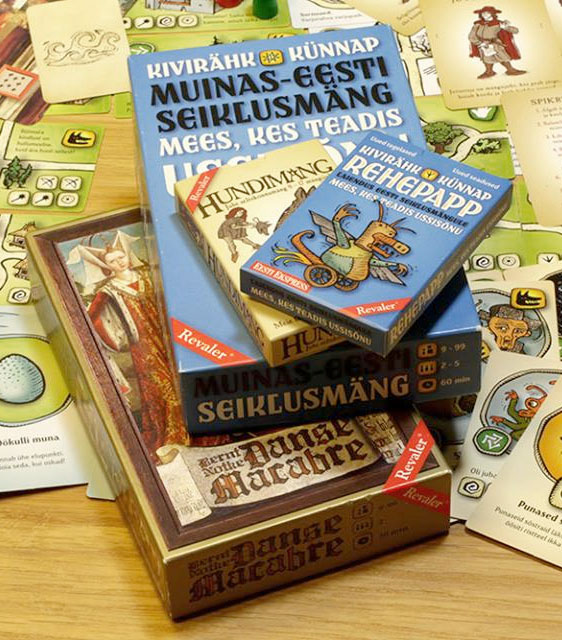
Board games published by Revaler with designs and illustrations by Asko Künnap.

=== Board games ===
Through Revaler Publishing and in collaboration with Priit Isok, Künnap has designed and released the board games Saaremaa, Farlander, Levi, Metsa Peremees, Surres kõige rohkem asju, Lotte lauamäng (with Heikki Ernits), Kalale, Ussisõnad (with Julia Maria Künnap), Danse Macabre, and Libahundid. Farlander was nominated for Game of the Year in Finland in 2005, and in Sweden in 2006. Ussisõnad was the highest-selling Estonian board game in 2009.

=== Comics and animation ===
Künnap wrote and drew the comic strip Kosmoserotid (Space Rats) for the Estonian weekly Eesti Ekspress in 1993; Ulg (Howl) and Kultuuriminister (The Minister of Culture) for Estonian cultural newspaper Sirp in 2004 and 2006–2007, respectively; and Monsieur Le Nez ja Herr Schnabel (Monsieur le Nez and Herr Schnabel) for Estonian wine magazine Vine. In collaboration with Kaspar Jancis, he was the co-writer as well as background- and character artist for the animated film See viimane sigaret (That Last Cigarette) and the 2007 DVD of animated films Must lagi (Black Ceiling).

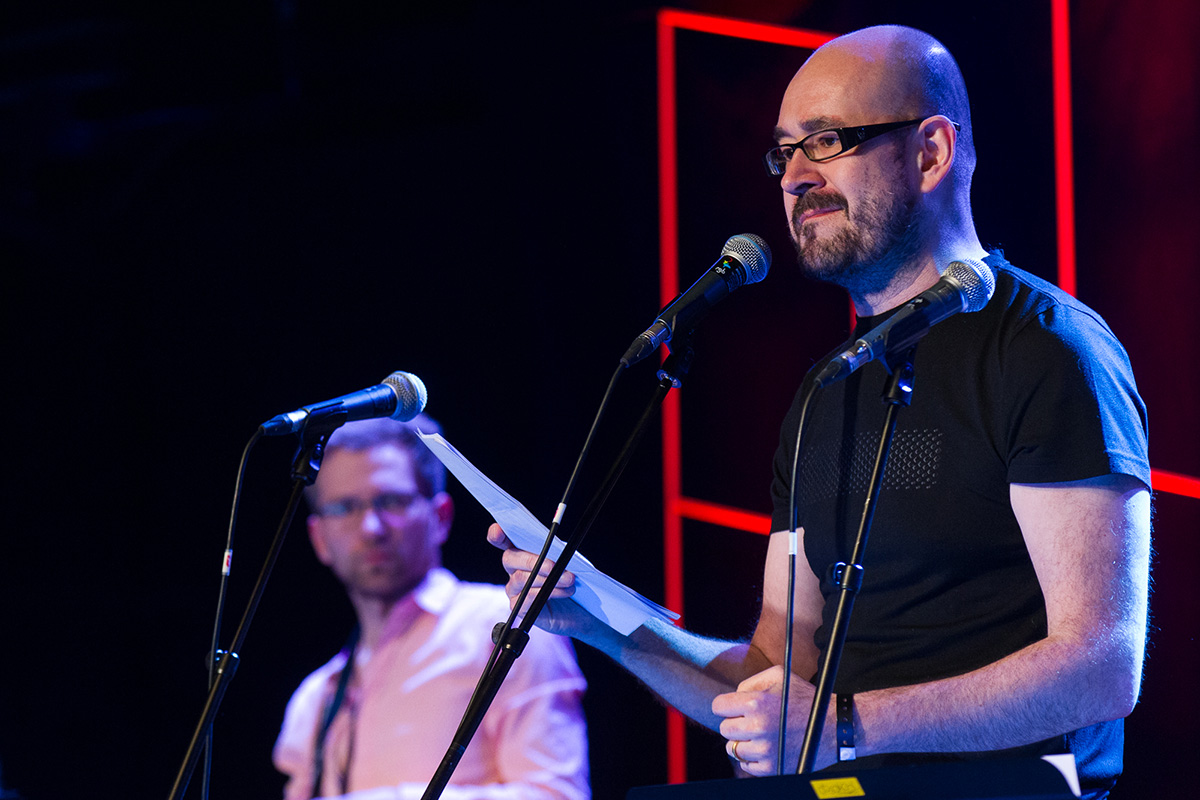
Asko Künnap performing with The Estonian Dream Big Band. Vaba Lava, Tallinn, Jazzkaar Festival. 18 April 2015

=== Music ===
Künnap has performed poetry together with a number of musicians and ensembles, including Estonian Dream Big Band, Eepiline Eesti Orkester, Siim Aimla, Paul Daniel, Heikki Kalle, Tõnu Timm, and others.

== Personal life ==
Künnap reads, walks, sketches labyrinths and coded messages, and watches dreams. He owns no television, reads no online commentaries, and belongs to no religious or political organizations.

== Books ==
- A Field Guide to Beetles, Näo Kirik 2011
- Memories, Näo Kirik 2011
- Your Nights are Numbered, Näo Kirik 2008
- The Most Beautiful War, Näo Kirik 2004
- And the Lizards Replied, Näo Kirik 2003
- In Defense of Convergences, Näo Kirik 2000
