= Pust budet vsjo =

1989 album by Ruja

Пусть будет все

Studio album by Ruja
- Released: 1989
- Recorded: 1987
- Genre: Progressive rock
- Label: Melodija

Ruja chronology
Kivi veereb (1987)	Пусть будет все (1989)	Must lind (1994)

Pust budet vsjo (Russian: Пусть будет все) is the fourth album by Estonian rock band Ruja.

The album contains Russian language versions of Ruja's songs. It's controversial for the band, because since there was Soviet occupation and russification in Estonia at that time, singing in Russian was against the band's principles.

The idea came from a manager, Yuri Altov, who saw Ruja's potential of having success outside Estonia. (The band had done concerts outside Estonia.)

== Track listing ==
=== A-side ===
1. "Будет свет" ("Budet svet" It Will Be Light) (Urmas Alender, Igor Garšnek, Jaanus Nõgisto/Alender; translation Ivan Makarov) - 3:30
2. "Белизна" ("Belizna" Whiteness) (Alender/Makarov) - 3:26
3. "Дети солнца" ("Deti solntsa" Children of the Sun) (Nõgisto; translation Makarov) - 4:01
4. "Гроза" ("Groza" Lightning) (Garšnek/Makarov) - 3:26
5. "Предчувствие зимы" ("Predchuvstvie zimy" Foreboding Winters) (Garšnek/Makarov) - 2:45
6. "Светлый край" ("Svetlyi krai" Bright Place) (Nõgisto/Doris Kareva; translation Makarov) - 2:17

=== B-side ===
1. "В чужом городе" ("V chuzhom gorode" In a Strange Town) (Toomas Rull/Makarov) - 3:13
2. "Сорванные цветы" ("Sorvannye tsvety" Broken Flowers) (Garšnek/Hando Runnel; translation Makarov) - 3:16
3. "Киногород" ("Kinogorod" Cinema City) (Garšnek/Makarov) - 3:06
4. "По ту сторону вод" ("Po tu storonu vod" Walk Along That Side) (Alender/Lehte Hainsalu) - 3:15
5. "Лебединая песня" ("Lebedinaja pesnja" Swan Song) (Garšnek/Makarov) - 4:00
6. "Пусть будет все" ("Pust budet vsjo" Let It Be All) (Alender/Makarov) - 3:10

== Personnel ==
- Urmas Alender (vocals, 12-string guitar)
- Indrek Patte (vocals in "Deti solntsa")
- Jaanus Nõgisto (guitar, backing vocals)
- Igor Garšnek (keyboards, backing vocals)
- Tiit Haagma (bass in "Budet svet", "Belizna", "Groza", "Predchuvstvije zimy", "V chuzhom gorode", "Po tu storonu vod")
- Vladislav Petšnikov a.k.a. S P Gulliver (bass in "Deti solntsa", "Svetlõi krai", "Sorvannye tsvety", "Kinogorod", "Lebedinaja pesnja")
- Toomas Rull (drums in "Budet svet", "Belizna", "Groza", "Predchuvstvije zimy", "V chuzhom gorode", "Po tu storonu vod")
- Arvo Urb (drums in "Deti solntsa", "Lebedinaja pesnja")
- Rein Joasoo (drums in "Svetlyi krai", "Sorvannye tsvety", "Kinogorod")
- Ivan Makarov (backing vocals in "Budet svet", "V chuzhom gorode")
