= Must lind =

1994 album by Ruja

Compilation album by Ruja
- Released: 1994
- Genre: Progressive rock

Ruja chronology
Пусть будет все (1989)	Must lind (1994)	Need ei vaata tagasi... Osa 1 (1999)

Must lind (Black bird) is a compilation album by Estonian rock band Ruja.

It was released after the tragedy of M/S Estonia, where the band's lead singer Urmas Alender died and is dedicated to him.

== Track listing ==
1. "Must lind" (Black bird) (Rein Rannap/Karl Eduard Sööt)
2. "Teisel pool vett" (On the other side of the water) (Urmas Alender)
3. "Mida teeksid siis" (What would you do then) (Alender, Igor Garšnek, Jaanus Nõgisto/Alender)
4. "Tulekell" (Fire clock) (Garšnek/Alender)
5. "Ei mullast..." (Not from the ground...) (Margus Kappel/Hando Runnel)
6. "Ajaloo õppetund" (A lesson in history) (Nõgisto/Juhan Viiding)
7. "Mida me räägime teistest" (What we talk about others) (Rannap/Ott Arder)
8. "Rävala rock" (Rannap/Arder)
9. "Omaette" (By itself) (Nõgisto/Viiding)
10. "Eleegia" (Elegy) (Alender)
11. "Üle müüri" (Over the wall) (Nõgisto/Viiding)
12. "Ha, ha, ha, ha" (Nõgisto/Viiding)
13. "Eile nägin ma Eestimaad" (Yesterday I saw Estonia) (Rannap/Arder)
14. "Murtud lilled" (Broken flowers) (Garšnek/Runnel)
15. "Veerev kivi" (Rolling stone) (Nõgisto/Vladislav Koržets)
16. "Vaiki kui võid" (Be silent if you may) (Alender)
17. "Läänemere lained" (Waves of the Baltic Sea) (Nõgisto/Juhan Liiv)
18. "Luigelaul" (Swan song) (Garšnek/Alender)
19. "Nii vaikseks kõik on jäänud" (It has become all so quiet) (Rannap/Ernst Enno)
