= Ago Soots =

Ago Soots (born 13 September 1984) is an Estonian actor.

In 2003, he graduated from Võru Kreutzwald Gymnasium and tried to enter the University of Tartu Viljandi Culture Academy's acting program, but was not accepted. He continued his studies at the Estonian University of Life Sciences (then EPMÜ) in the field of land construction.

From 2001 to 2003, he acted in the drama studio of Võru Theatre Studio, and from 2003 to 2004, in the Tartu Student Theatre.

From 2004 to 2008, he studied at the Estonian Academy of Music and Theatre and graduated from its 23rd class. Since 2008, he has been working as an actor at the VAT Theatre.

In addition to student films, he has appeared in the feature film "The Wish Tree", where he played the security guard Aivo.

== Awards ==
- Voldemar Panso Award (2007)
