= Peeter Jalakas =

Estonian director

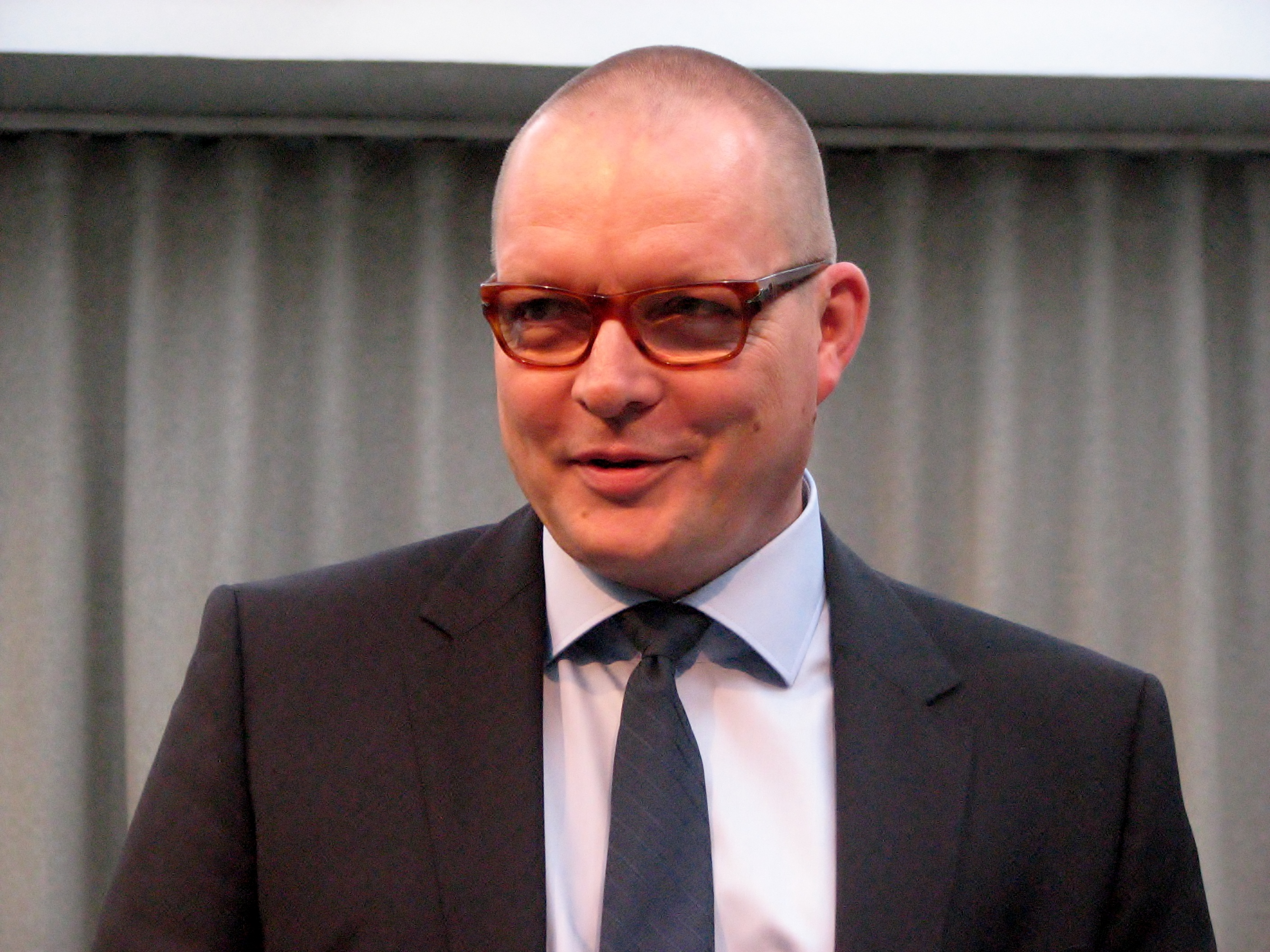
- Born: 5 January 1961 (age 65); Tallinn, then part of Estonian SSR, Soviet Union
- Occupations: Theatre director, producer, playwright, restaurateur
- Known for: Establishing VAT Theatre, Ruto Killakund, and Von Krahl Theatre
- Awards: Order of the White Star, IV class (2015)

Peeter Jalakas (born 5 January 1961 in Tallinn) is an Estonian theatre director, producer, playwright and restaurateur.

In 1987, he established Estonia's first independent theatre company: VAT Theatre. In 1989 he established the theatre group Ruto Killakund. He is also the founder of theatre festival Baltoscandal. In 1992 he established Von Krahl Theatre.

In 2015, he was awarded with Order of the White Star, IV class.
