= Künnap =

Family name

Origin
- Language: Estonian
- Meaning: "sinew"
- Region of origin: Estonia

Other names
- Variant forms: Künnapas, Künnapuu, Künnapu

Künnap is an Estonian surname derived from künnapuu ("European white elm"), often used to make agricultural ploughs. As of 1 January 2021, 118 men and 120 women have the surname Künnap in Estonia. In terms of the distribution of surnames, Künnap ranks 653rd for men and 724th for women. The surname is most commonly found in Pärnu County, where 6.81 per 10,000 inhabitants of the county bear the name.

Notable people bearing the surname Künnap include:

- Ago Künnap (born 1941), linguist
- Asko Künnap (born 1971), artist, graphic designer, and writer
- Jaan Künnap (born 1948), mountaineer, photographer, and sports coach
- Mait Künnap (born 1982), tennis player
