= Propeller (band) =

Estonian musical group

- Origin: Tallinn, Estonia
- Genres: Punk rock
- Years active: 1978–1980, 1995–present
- Label: Fugata
- Members: Peeter Volkonski; Peeter Malkov; Peeter Määrits; Ain Varts; Priit Kuulberg; Aneta Varts (2013-); Albert Trapeež
- Past members: Urmas Alender; Ivo Varts (-2013); Riho Sibul

Propeller is an Estonian punk band formed in 1978.

Propeller were one of the first punk rock bands formed in the Estonian Soviet Socialist Republic, which was still subordinate to the Soviet Union. The band achieved a deal of notoriety on 22 September 1980, when they were invited by workers from Eesti Rahvusringhääling to perform a concert at halftime at Kadriorg Stadium in Tallinn during a football match and after the game. After performing to a crowd of approximately 7,000 people during the halftime show, Soviet authorities then forbid the band from playing their post-show concert, instigating a riot that soon swept through Tallinn. As the band was blamed for being the catalyst that sparked the riots, authorities forced Propeller to disband shortly afterward and all recordings held by Eesti Raadio were destroyed. Band members, however, had kept the original 1980 recordings and in 1995, their self-titled, only full-length album was released by Fugata Ltd.

== Line-up (other bands where played) ==
- Urmas Alender (Varjud, Andromeeda, Teravik, Data, Kaseke, Aatomitriikraud, Ruja) – vocals
- Prince Peeter Volkonski (Rosta Aknad, Hõim, Ruja) – vocals
- Peeter Malkov (Nemo, Dr. Friedrich, Ultima Thule, Kaseke, Haak) – vocals, flute
- Peeter Määrits (Kaseke) – vocals
- Ain Varts (T-Klaas, Kaseke, In Spe, Avicenna, Dr. Friedrich, Kala, Haak) – guitar
- Riho Sibul (Kaseke, E=mc 2, In Spe, Muusik Seif, VSP Projekt, Kobrin Blues Band, Ultima Thule, Was Is´t Das, Radar, Lainer, Magnetic Band, Haak) – guitar
- Priit Kuulberg (Toomapojad, Magnetic Band, Ruja, In Spe, Haak, Kaseke, T-Klaas, HZ Bigband, Micis Bigband, Levimo) – bass guitar
- Ivo Varts (Nemo, Dr. Friedrich, In Spe, Kaseke, Mahavok, Ruja, Haak, Compromise Blue) – percussion
- Albert Trapeež – poetry
