= Rakvere =

Town in Estonia

- City
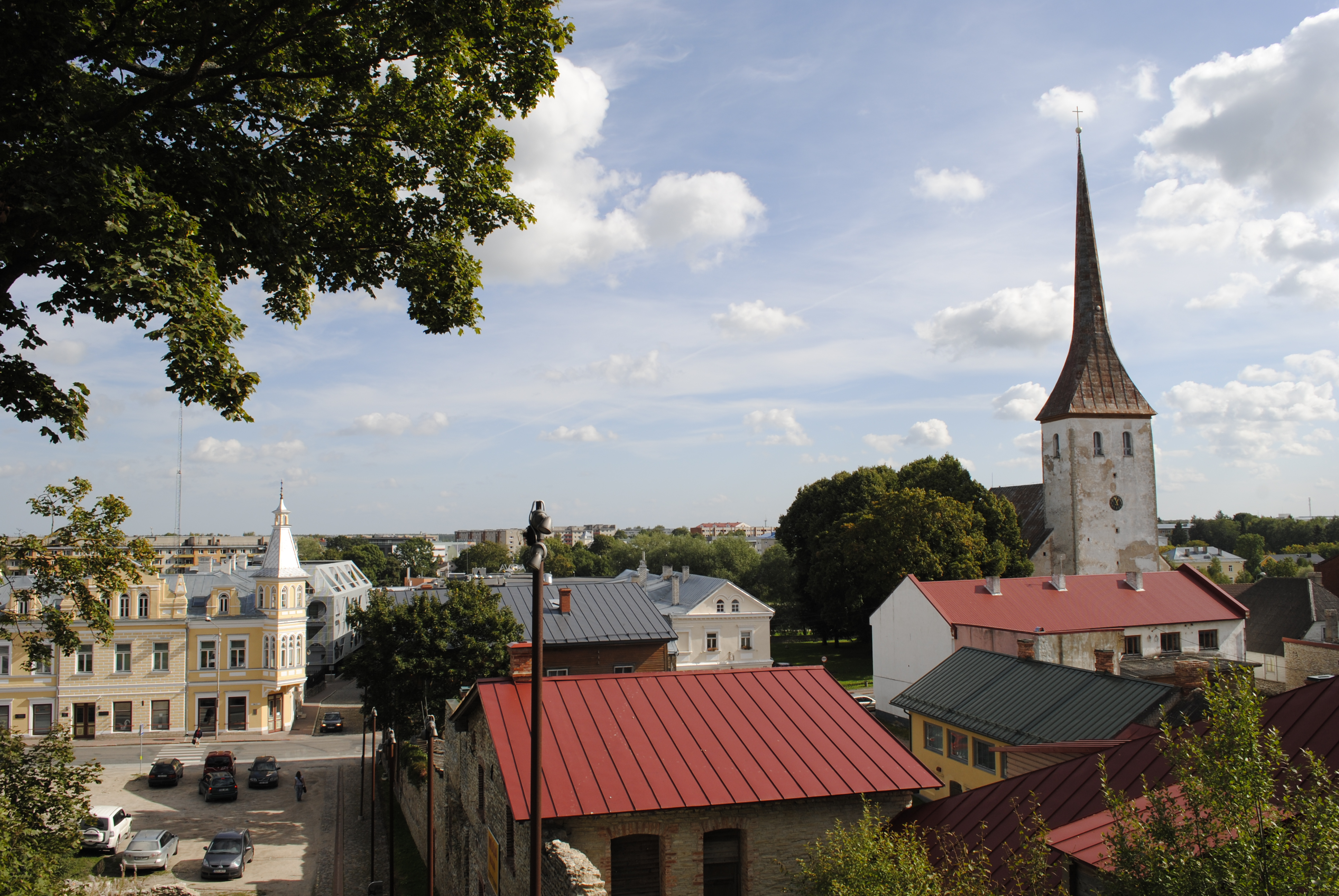
- View over Rakvere

- Flag Coat of arms
- Motto: Väge täis (Full of might)
- Location in Estonia Rakvere (Baltic Sea)
- Coordinates: 59°21′N 26°21′E
- Country: Estonia
- County: Lääne-Viru County

Government
  - Mayor: Triin Varek (Isamaa)

Area
  - Total: 10.75 km^{2} (4.15 sq mi)
- Elevation: 82 m (269 ft)

Population (2024)
  - Total: 15,516
  - Rank: 8th
  - Density: 1,443/km^{2} (3,738/sq mi)

Ethnicity
  - Estonians: 88%
  - Russians: 9%
  - other: 3%
- Time zone: UTC+2 (EET)
  - Summer (DST): UTC+3 (EEST)
- Postal code: 44306
- Area code: (+372) 032
- ISO 3166 code: EE-663
- Vehicle registration: R
- Website: www.rakvere.ee

Rakvere is the administrative center, or county seat, of Lääne-Viru County in northern Estonia, about 100 km southeast of Tallinn and 20 km south of the Gulf of Finland and the Baltic Sea. In 2026, like in 2023, Rakvere received a Green Destinations Gold Award after having been selected in 2021 as part of the Top 100 Destination Sustainability Stories. In 2022, Rakvere was one of 10 ACES European Towns of Sport.

Rakvere boasts a distinctive architectural feature: the Rakvere door. Reflecting German baroque cabinets of the 17th and 18th centuries and the expressionist style of the 1920s, the wooden Rakvere door has a pointed, raised rectangle in the center. In 2023, there were 15 Rakvere doors on 13 houses.

== Name ==
A settlement called Tarvanpea, which means the 'head of an aurochs', was first mentioned in 1226 in the Livonian Chronicle of Henry. This Danish stronghold was first recorded as Wesenbergh, the Middle Low German adaptation of Tarvanpea, in 1252, and, up until the early 20th century, the town was widely known as Wesenberg. The name Rakovor appears in 1268 in the Russian Novgorod First Chronicle, and present-day Rakvere is associated with Rägavere, in which vere in Estonian refers to a topographical feature. Rakvere has also been referred to as Tarvanpää.

== History ==
The earliest signs of a human settlement, dating back to the 3rd, 4th, and 5th centuries AD, have been found on Rakvere's Theatre Hill (Teatrimägi). Probably to protect this settlement, a wooden stronghold was built on another hill, or mound, (Vallimägi) nearby, Rakvere's highest point.

After the Kingdom of Denmark conquered northern Estonia, it started to erect stone buildings in 1220. The Battle of Wesenberg, with the Danish and Teutonic knights and local militia on one side and the forces of Novgorod and Pskov on the other, occurred near Rakvere on 18 February 1268. The Danish King Erik VI Menved granted Rakvere Lübeck rights on 12 June 1302. After the king sold Danish Estonia to the Livonian Order in 1346, a large stone castle was built on top of the stronghold on Vallimägi. The Ordensburg was protected by towers and courtyards.

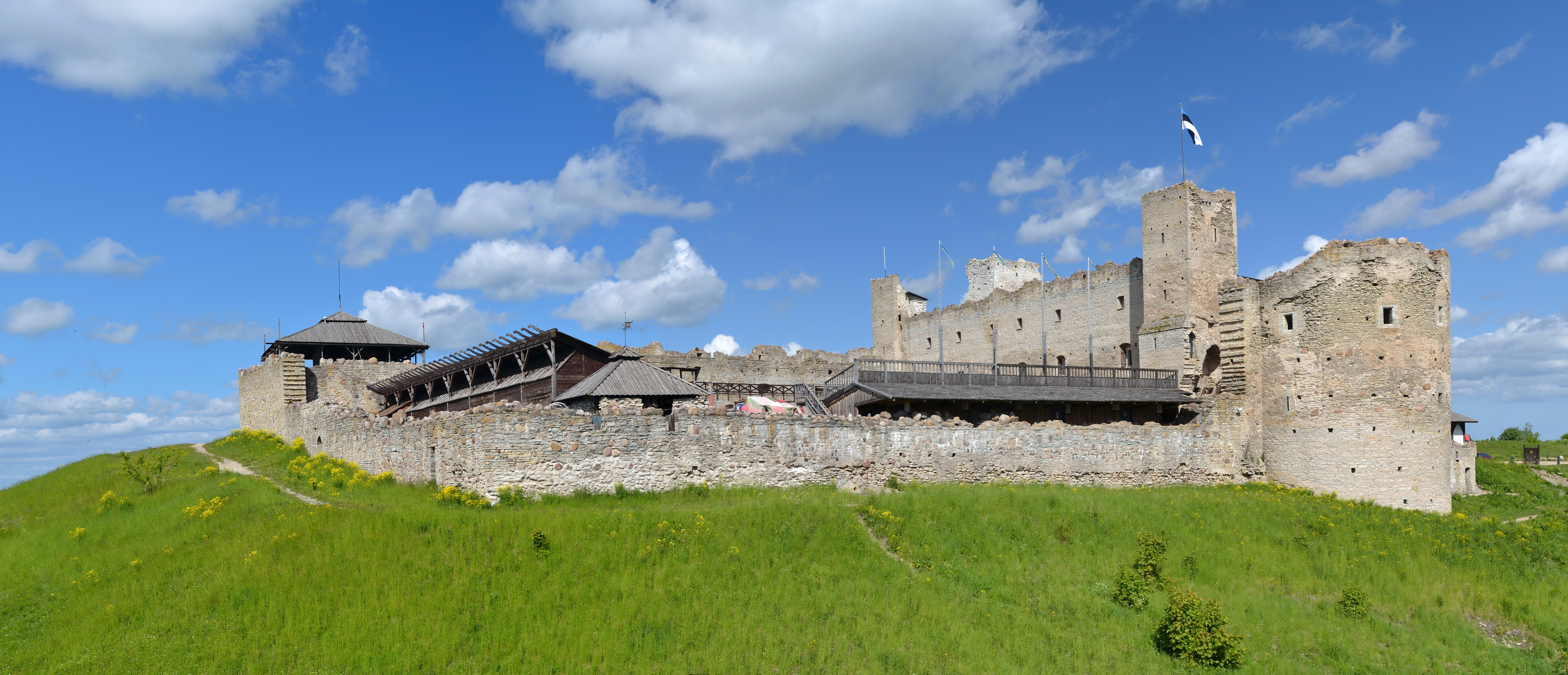
Rakvere Castle

In 1502, in the Battle of Smolino, the Catholic Teutonic Order defeated Russian forces and promised Michael the Archangel that they would build monasteries in Livonia. One of them was the Franciscan monastery built on Rakvere's Theatre Hill in 1506 or 1508. In 1517, as the Protestant Reformation began, the books from Rakvere's monastery were moved to the Oleviste Church Library, founded in 1552, in Tallinn and, eventually, to the Center for Old and Rare Books at the Tallinn University Academic Library, founded in 1946.

In 1558, during the first year of the Livonian War, Russian troops captured Rakvere, and, in 1574, Sweden heavily damaged the town after the disastrous Siege of Wesenberg. In 1581, Sweden captured Rakvere and passed it to the Polish–Lithuanian Commonwealth in 1602; Polish troops destroyed the castle in 1605. After Rakvere returned to Swedish control that same year, a mansion was built on the ruins of the monastery. In 1703, during the Great Northern War, Rakvere was burned down. With the capitulation of Estonia and Livonia in 1710 and the subsequent Treaty of Nystad in 1721, Russia became part of the Russian Empire for the next 200 years.

On 28 November 1918, the 6th Rifle Division (Soviet Union) attacked the Estonian border town of Narva, marking the beginning of the Estonian War of Independence. The Red Army captured Rakvere on 16 December, and the city was in their hands until 12 January 1919, when Estonian and Finnish troops ran them out. During that time, the "Bolshevik terrorists" murdered 82 innocent people in Rakvere's Palermo forest. Excavations on 17 and 18 January 1919 found bodies with bullet wounds, bayonet wounds, and strangulation marks. In the Treaty of Tartu (Estonia-Russia), signed 2 February 1920, Russia recognized the independence and sovereignty of Estonia.

Between 1918 until 1940, Estonia completed its first railway, and Rakvere was at the heart of the crucial Tallinn-Rakvere-Narva-St. Petersburg trade route. Telephone lines had been installed in 1898, and nearly the entire city had electric lights in 1918. Many prominent buildings were built, too, in Rakvere, during this period, including the market building, the old bank building (today, SEB Pank), and Rakvere Secondary School (since 2022, Rakvere Freedom School). Local newspapers emerged, including the county paper Virumaa Teataja in 1925. The idea of a professional theatre in Rakvere started to take shape as well. In 1930, during the administration of Mayor Heinrich Aviksoo, the town stadium opened. Later, Anton Soans developed a new master plan from which emerged a private German-language school and a public Estonian-language high school.

With Estonia in World War II, the Soviet Red Army invaded and occupied the country in June 1940. On 14 June 1941, hundreds of Rakvere's residents were deported to Russia. From 7 August 1941 to 19 September 1944, the city was occupied by Germany. In the autumn of 1941, the Dulag 102 prisoner-of-war camp was relocated from Šiauliai to Rakvere, and was later moved to Volosovo. On 19 September 1944, the Soviets bombed the city, killing at least 20 civilians, including two children. The next day the city was reoccupied by the Soviets.

Rakvere reverted to its status as a self-governing municipality on 24 January 1991. The Estonian Restoration of Independence was on 20 August 1991.

On 15 July 2000, a high-end F2/T5 tornado hit Rakvere, killing one person and injuring one other. The tornado damaged 110 homes and destroyed 120 garage buildings. One car was seen airborne.

== Transport ==
The T5 highway to Pärnu starts near Rakvere, and the T1 Tallinn-Narva highway, part of European route E20, is just to the north of the city. Narva is 114 km to the east of Rakvere. The Tallinn-Narva railway passes through the city, and passenger trains between Tallinn and Narva, operated by Elron (rail transit), stop at Rakvere several times a day. Daily busses connect Rakvere to Tallinn and Narva, too, as well as to many small towns throughout Lääne-Viru County, including Tapa and Kunda.

== Geography ==
Rakvere has a total area of 10.75 square kilometres. Although about 15% of Rakvere is covered by forests and parks, it is Estonia's third most densely populated urban area.

=== Administrative divisions ===
There are 19 districts, or neighborhoods, in Rakvere:

- Kondivalu
- Kukeküla
- Kurikaküla
- Lennuvälja
- Lepiku
- Lilleküla
- Linnuriik
- Moonaküla
- Mõisavälja
- Paemurru
- Palermo
- Roodevälja
- Seminari
- Südalinn
- Taaravainu
- Tammiku
- Vallimäe
- Vanalinn
- Õpetaja Heinamaa

== Demographics ==
=== Ethnicity ===
Historic Population Proportions in Rakvere
Ethnicity	Year	Population & Percentage
Estonians	1922	6,885 (89.9%)
Estonians	1934	9,108 (90.8%)
Estonians	1941	8,099 (95.7%)
Estonians	1959	11,168 (78.1%)
Estonians	1970	13,292 (74.3%)
Estonians	1979	14,550 (76.5%)
Estonians	1989	14,902 (75.2%)
Estonians	2000	14,496 (84.8%)
Estonians	2011	13,445 (88.1%)
Estonians	2021	13,386 (88.4%)
Russians	1922	304 (4.0%)
Russians	1934	355 (3.5%)
Russians	1941	163 (1.9%)
Russians	1970	3,441 (19.2%)
Russians	1979	3,326 (17.5%)
Russians	1989	3,545 (17.9%)
Russians	2000	1,845 (10.8%)
Russians	2011	1,371 (9.0%)
Russians	2021	1,155 (7.6%)
Ukrainians	1970	410 (2.3%)
Ukrainians	1979	355 (1.9%)
Ukrainians	1989	507 (2.6%)
Ukrainians	2000	218 (1.3%)
Ukrainians	2011	150 (1.0%)
Ukrainians	2021	193 (1.3%)
Others (Belarusians, Finns, Jews, Latvians, Germans, Tatars, Poles, Lithuanians, unknown)	1922	470 (6.1%)
Others (Belarusians, Finns, Jews, Latvians, Germans, Tatars, Poles, Lithuanians, unknown)	1934	564 (5.6%)
Others (Belarusians, Finns, Jews, Latvians, Germans, Tatars, Poles, Lithuanians, unknown)	1941	204 (2.4%)
Others (Belarusians, Finns, Jews, Latvians, Germans, Tatars, Poles, Lithuanians, unknown)	1959	3,128 (21.9%)
Others (Belarusians, Finns, Jews, Latvians, Germans, Tatars, Poles, Lithuanians, unknown)	1970	748 (4.2%)
Others (Belarusians, Finns, Jews, Latvians, Germans, Tatars, Poles, Lithuanians, unknown)	1979	780 (4.1%)
Others (Belarusians, Finns, Jews, Latvians, Germans, Tatars, Poles, Lithuanians, unknown)	1989	868 (4.4%)
Others (Belarusians, Finns, Jews, Latvians, Germans, Tatars, Poles, Lithuanians, unknown)	2000	538 (3.1%)
Others (Belarusians, Finns, Jews, Latvians, Germans, Tatars, Poles, Lithuanians, unknown)	2011	298 (1.9%)
Others (Belarusians, Finns, Jews, Latvians, Germans, Tatars, Poles, Lithuanians, unknown)	2021	406 (2.7%)

The demographic profile of Rakvere has shifted over the course of the 20th century. Early data points, such as the 1922, 1934, and 1941 censuses, were compiled by the Riigi Statistika Keskbüroo (Central Statistical Bureau of Estonia). Modern census data from 2000, 2011, and 2021 is managed by Statistics Estonia (Statistikaamet). In the pre-war period, the municipality maintained a high degree of ethnic homogeneity, with Estonians accounting for 89.9 percent of inhabitants in 1922. and 95.7 percent by 1941. Following the incorporation of Estonia into the Soviet Union, the proportion of ethnic Estonians decreased to a historical low of 74.3 percent in 1970. This shift was driven by an increase in minority populations, particularly ethnic Russians, whose share of the population peaked at 17.9 percent in 1989. The Russian population shows a distinct upward trend during the post-war era, growing from less than two percent in 1941 to a peak of 19.2 percent in 1970. followed by a steady decline in subsequent decades. Minor ethnic groups, including Ukrainians, Belarusians, and Finns, increase in population from 1970 onwards. Following the restoration of Estonian independence, the demographic trend reversed. The proportion of Estonians rose to 84.8 percent in 2000. and reached 88.4 percent by 2021.

=== Religion ===
Religion in Rakvere City (2021).
1. Unaffiliated (83.2%)
2. Lutheran (8.50%)
3. Orthodox (4.00%)
4. Other Christians (1.80%)
5. Other religions or unknown (2.50%)

The religious demographic profile of Rakvere, according to the 2021 Estonian census, is secular, with the majority of residents identifying as religiously unaffiliated. Specifically, unaffiliated individuals constitute 83.2 percent of the city's population, making them the largest demographic group. Among those who do practice a faith, Christianity represents the primary religion, led by Lutherans at 8.5 percent and Orthodox Christians at 4.0 percent. Other Christian denominations comprise a minor share of 1.8 percent, while individuals belonging to other faiths or those with unknown religious statuses account for the remaining 2.5 percent of the local population.

== Landmarks ==
=== Rakvere Castle (Linnus) ===
The oldest known archeological traces of the ancient fortress on Rakvere's Vallimägi hill date from the 5th and 6th centuries. Throughout the ages, Rakvere Castle has belonged to Danish kings, knight-monks of the Livonian Order, and the Swedish and Polish states. During the Polish-Swedish War of 1600-1629, the castle was partly blown up by Polish troops in 1605 and later by the Swedish army. The castle has lain in ruins ever since.

Today, permanent exhibitions and seasonal programs and activities in the castle explain everyday life in the 16th century. Visitors can dress as medieval knights and walk through the castle's rooms, including a torture chamber, an alchemist's workshop, and a room of historical artifacts.

=== Rakvere Trinity Church (Kolmainu Kirik) ===
Trinity Church, Rakvere's Lutheran church, originally called St. Michael Church and dedicated to St. Michael the Archangel, dates from the 15th century. It was designed to also be a stronghold in times of trouble. The tower, the masonry stairway, the sharp edges of the windows, and some pillars have been preserved. The church was severely damaged during the Livonian War and during Polish-Swedish conflicts in the 17th century. It was reconstructed from 1684 to 1693, becoming a three-nave chamber from which the name Trinity Church came. In 1703 and 1708, during the Great Northern War, the church was damaged again. It was reconstructed from 1727 to 1730; a Renaissance-style tower was completed in 1752, which was replaced by a neo-Gothic tower in 1852. The church's interior displays fine craftsmanship, including a Baroque pulpit from 1690 made by Christian Ackermann and the altar wall from 1730 by Johann Valentin Rabe. A statute of an egg and a cock that was on the top of the tower is now in the Rakvere Museum

=== Long Street (Pikk Tänav) ===
Long, or Pikk, Street is the oldest street in Rakvere. Most Estonian cities have a Pikk Street, which is like a High Street in the United Kingdom or a Main Street in the United States. In the 19th century and first half of the 20th century, Pikk Street was Rakveres's main shopping street with banks, shops, restaurants, and guesthouses as well as the residences of the town's wealthiest businessmen. In 2016, during the celebration of the 100th Anniversary of the Estonian Republic (Estonian: Eesti Vabariik 100), Rakvere was one of 15 municipalities that won the "Good [sometimes translated as Great] Public Space" competition and received financing from the European Union Regional Development Fund and Enterprise Estonia to reconstruct approximately 700 meters of Pikk Street as a pedestrian-friendly, historical thoroughfare reminiscent of the 19th and early 20th centuries. The National Heritage Board of Estonia (Estonian: Muinsuskaitseamet) recognized Rakvere's project with its 2020 New Building in a Historical Environment award, and, in 2021, Estonia showcased it at Venice's 17th Biennale of Architecture. A sculpture of eight-year-old Estonian: Edith Kotka-Nyman (1932-2017) by G.S. Hansen is at 22 Pikk Street, and, behind her, are the so-called Carrot Stairs (Estonian: Porganditrepp) that lead up to Vallimägi and Rakvere Castle with wider steps at the top and narrower ones at the bottom.

=== Rakvere Theatre and Manor House (Teater ja mõis) ===
Rakvere is reportedly Europe's smallest town with its own professional theatre.

The roots of Rakvere Theatre date back to 1882. Following independence, Estonian Land Reform of 1919 gave Rakvere's originally Swedish manor house (mõis) to the local government. On 4 May 1920, Mayor Jakob Liiv created the Rakvere Community Center Society (Rahvamaja Selts) to manage the formerly private building. Liiv's leadership helped create Rakvere Theatre. Construction of the theatre building - an addition to the manor house turned community center now cultural center (kultuurikeskus) - was completed at the end of the 1930s. Its festive opening was on 24 February 1940. The theatre survived World War II, and it was renovated in 2005. A cinema was built along a wall of the manor's carriage stable in 2016.

Today, Rakvere Theatre presents 10 new productions each season. The theatre has given Estonia many renowned actors, including Volli Käro, Üllar Saaremäe, Indrek Saar, Ülle Lichtfeldt, and Aarne Üksküla. Since 1990, it has organized the biannual event Baltoscandal, which hosts avant-garde plays and groups from all over the world.

=== Rakvere Central Square (Keskväljak) ===
In 2004, Rakvere's central, or town, square got a new, modern look with architects' Otto Kadarik, Mihkel Tüür, and Villem Tomiste's five yellow domes (that also look like umbrellas or chanterelle mushrooms or medieval turret tops) hanging from white semi-arches on cobbled hills. In 2010, the sculpture A Young Man on Bicycle Listening to Music was dedicated to Estonian composer Arvo Pärt, a former resident of Rakvere, in honor of his 75th birthday The sculptors are Aivar Simson and Paul Mänd. Surrounding the young man and the square is Rakvere's central business district, including a historical market building and the SEB Pank building, one of the most representative bank buildings in Estonia designed by Ferdinand Gustav Adoff.

=== St. Paul's Church (Pauluse Kirik) and Ukuaru Concert Hall (Muusikamaja) ===
Estonian architect and Rakvere native Alar Kotli designed St. Paul's (Freedom) Church in 1935 to celebrate the 20th anniversary of Estonian independence. Construction started in 1937 but stopped in 1940 due to World War II. Lutheran Bishop Johann Kõpp consecrated the church on June 16, 1940, just as the Soviet Red Army invaded Estonia.

In 1951, the church was in the hands of the Soviets. The main hall was used for playing basketball and volleyball. Some rooms served as a weightlifting gym, others as youth facilities, right up until 2016.

In the early 1990s, after Estonia had regained its independence, the Tower Bar (Torni Baar) operated in one of the church towers. With only a couple of tables, it became a place where young athletes and the local underground crowd spent time together listening to punk and rock music as well as the blues. Photographs of the bar reportedly exist but only in private family albums.

Although St. Paul's was one of the few churches in Estonia with two towers, it was never completed, and the towers were never crowned with its spires. However, in 2009, Rakvere's local government launched an international architectural competition for designs that would transform Kotli's church building into a multifunctional music center and concert hall in honor of Arvo Pärt, who lived in Rakvere with his mother from 1938 until at least 1965. Rakvere selected Estonian architects Kristiina Aasvee, Kristiina Hussar, and Anne Kose, working together as Stuudio KAH OÜ, and their 20-million-euro design for what became known as the Ukuaru Concert Hall (Ukuaru Muusikamaja). On March 27, 2025, 85 years late, a spire was rested atop the northwest tower of Kotli's church. A spire for the east tower followed on April 29. The brass flag on the tower has the year 2025, and the one on the east tower has 1940.

== Notable buildings ==
=== Rakvere Freedom School (Vabaduse Kool) ===
The building of Rakvere Freedom School (Estonian: Rakvere Vabaduse Kool), designed by alumnus Alar Kotli, is a significant example of Functionalism. A key characteristic of Functionalism (architecture) in school architecture is an open building plan that incorporates plain white wall surfaces and round windows. Opened in 1938 or 1939, Freedom School was one of the first schools to have a separate gymnasium and assembly hall. It housed one of the most expensive pianos, purchased from an English company, used in any Estonian school. Today, local singers and musicians contend that Freedom School's assembly hall has the best acoustics of any school in Lääne Viru County.

From 1940 to 1944, the Ministry of Education of the Estonian Soviet Socialist Republic operated Rakvere I and Rakvere II Secondary Schools in two shifts in the Freedom School building. In 1944, the two schools consolidated under the name Rakvere Secondary School. In 1946, it was the Rakvere Estonian Secondary School, and in 1950, Rakvere I Secondary School.

From 1994 to 2022, Freedom School was Rakvere Secondary School (gümnaasium). In 2022, the Estonian Ministry of Education and Research opened a state, or national, high school (Estonian: Rakvere Riigigümnaasium) in a new 4,100-square-meter building, and Freedom School became an elementary school and middle school.

Harald Estonian: Henno Jänes, an Estonian patriot, was the director of the school during a period of significant growth - from 1936 until he was dismissed and replaced in August 1940. Jänes fled to Sweden to escape persecution by the Soviet Union. Jänes's son established a scholarship fund in 1993 in his father's name. In 1943, Ado Pajo graduated from the school and fought against Soviet forces in Finland as well as Estonia. Pajo returned to the school in 1950 to teach mathematics for more than 30 years. Established in 2006, the Pajo Memorial Medal recognizes the best mathematics student in each year's graduating class. In 1954, composer Arvo Pärt graduated from the school. Across the street from Freedom School the Municipality of Rakvere is converting St. Paul's Church, also designed by Kotli, into a multipurpose music center in honor of Pärt. In 1970, entrepreneur Estonian: Oleg Gross graduated from the school. Established in 2004, the Oleg Gross Award recognizes graduates who are active in their communities.

== Public sculptures ==
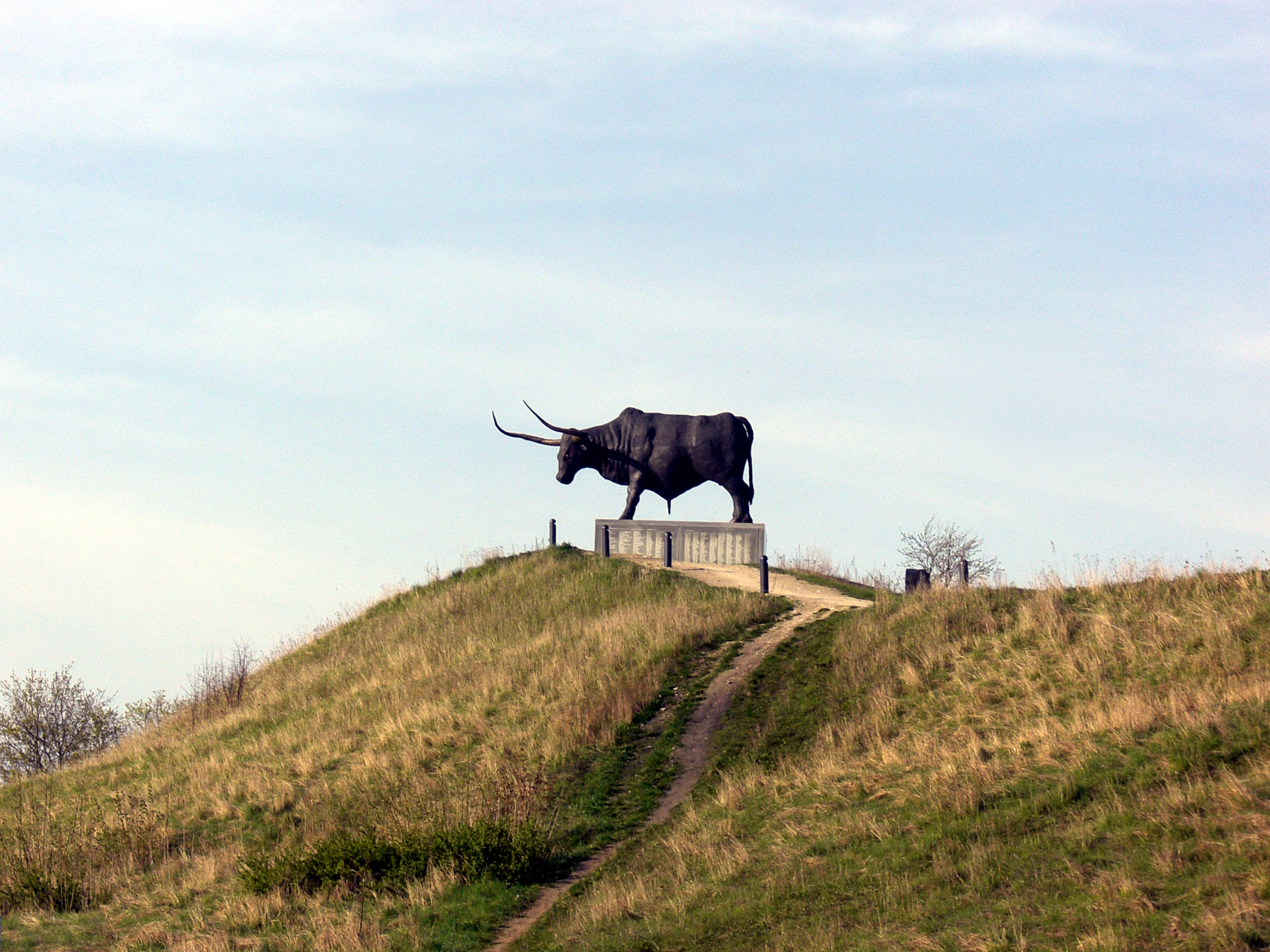
Tarvas sculpture

=== Aurochs Sculpture (Skulptuur Tarvas) ===
Rakvere's Tarvas statue of an aurochs, by Estonian sculptor Tauno Kangro, is considered the largest animal statue in the Baltic region. Along with its granite pedestal, the bronze sculpture is seven meters long and five meters high and weighs about seven tons. According to archeological excavations, animals like the aurochs once lived around Rakvere.

Unveiled on June 15, 2002, on the edge of Vallimägi in celebration of Rakvere's 700th anniversary, Tarvas paid homage to the town's historical name Tarvanpää and symbolizes the town's motto Väge täis (Full of Strength). The individuals and companies who financed the sculpture are engraved into the granite block.

According to an urban myth, a woman will have a happy marriage and a large family if, before her wedding ceremony, she comes to Tarvas, spreads jam on its testicles, and licks the jam off.

=== A Young Man on a Bicycle Listening to Music (Noormees jalgrattal muusikat kuulamas) ===
In 1949, in order to enjoy symphony broadcasts on Estonian radio, played over the loudspeakers in Rakvere's town square, Arvo Pärt rode his bike around the square. On September 11, 2010, the Young Man on a Bicycle sculpture, created by Aivar Simson and Paul Mänd, was unveiled on the square in honor of Pärt's 75th birthday.

== Public parks ==
=== Rakvere Oak Grove Preserve (Estonian: Tammiku maastikukaitseala) ===
The Oak Grove Preserve, created in 1999 but in existence since to 1939, has hiking trails over 24.5 hectares with information boards along the paths that introduce individuals to trees up to 240-years-old as well as a variety of lichens and birds. The park surrounds a World War II German military cemetery.

=== Rakvere Manor House Park (Mõisapark) ===
The park behind Rakvere Theatre was originally a garden for the 16th-century monastery and then a park for the 17th-century manor house. It is also known as the Theatre Park.

== Sports ==
=== Athletic facilities ===
- Rakvere Sports Hall (Rakvere Spordikeskus) (opened in 2004)
- Rakvere Municipal Stadium (Rakvere Linnastaadion) (renovated in 2005)
- Artificial turf football field (built in 2007, renovated in 2016) - adjacent ropes course (2024) and basketball courts
- Rahu Hall - an indoor basketball/volleyball court
- Aqua Tennis Center (2016) with outdoor courts (2021) by reservation and Rakvere People's Park Outdoor Tennis Courts
- Palermo Fitness and Adventure Trails - 2 km and 3 km trails with a children's playground
- Rakvere Disc Golf Park (Discgolfi park) (2018) - 18 baskets, par 3 or 4, over 1,770 meters in a forest
- Skateboard Park (2016) - within walking distance of the artificial turf football field
- Rakvere Indoor Football Field - the 80,000 square meter project of the Estonian Football Union is scheduled to open in January 2026.

=== Sports clubs ===
- Basketball
  - Rakvere Tarvas – a men's basketball team, Estonian second best basketball club in season 2009/2010. In season 2019/2020 they were 4th. The club takes part in Paf Estonian Latvian basketball league. This is the best basketball league in Estonia. The home ground is Kastani Arena.
- Volleyball
  - BMF/Rakvere VK (Võrkpalliklub) – a men's volleyball team in the Men's First (Premier) League (Meeste I Liiga) of the Estonian Volleyball Union (Eesti Võrkpalli Liit) (2024-2025). Their home court is the Rakvere Sports Hall (Rakvere Spordihall).
  - Rakvere VK – a men's volleyball team that was a multiple Estonian Champion and Cup winner, which took part in Esiliiga, the second best volleyball league in Estonia.
- Football
  - Rakvere JK Tarvas – an amateur football club established in 2004. The club plays in Estonian II liiga (fourth tier in Estonian football). In 2016 they played in Estonian premium league. The home ground is Rakvere linnastaadion.

=== Sporting events ===
- Night Run Estonia
- Amateur Sumo World Championships 2008
- U19 EURO2012

== Twin towns / sister cities ==
Rakvere is twinned with:

- Cēsis, Latvia
- Lappeenranta, Finland
- Lapua, Finland
- Lütjenburg, Germany
- Sigtuna, Sweden
- Panevėžys, Lithuania
- Senaki, Georgia
- Szolnok, Hungary
- Vyshhorod, Ukraine

== Gallery ==
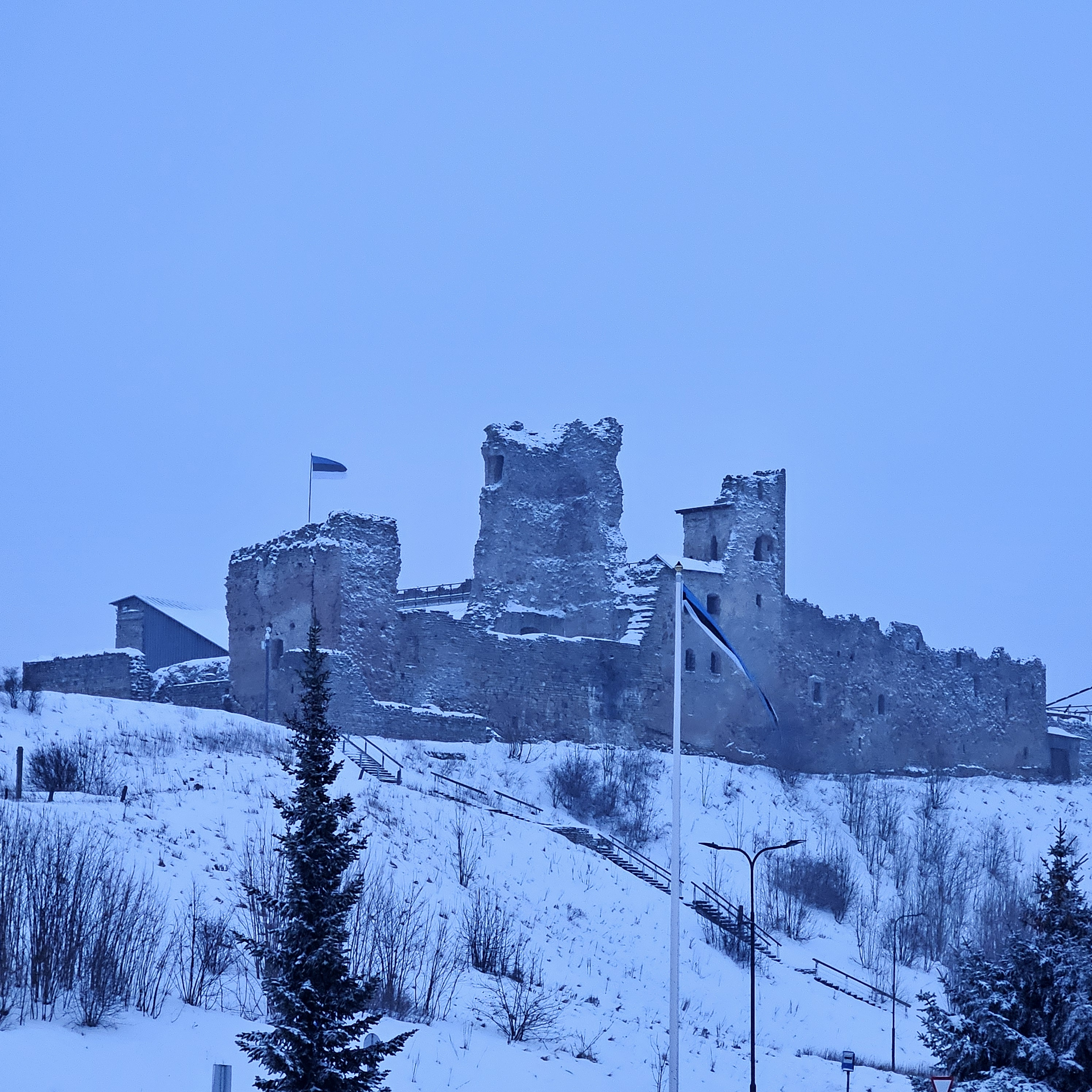
Rakvere Castle Winter 2024

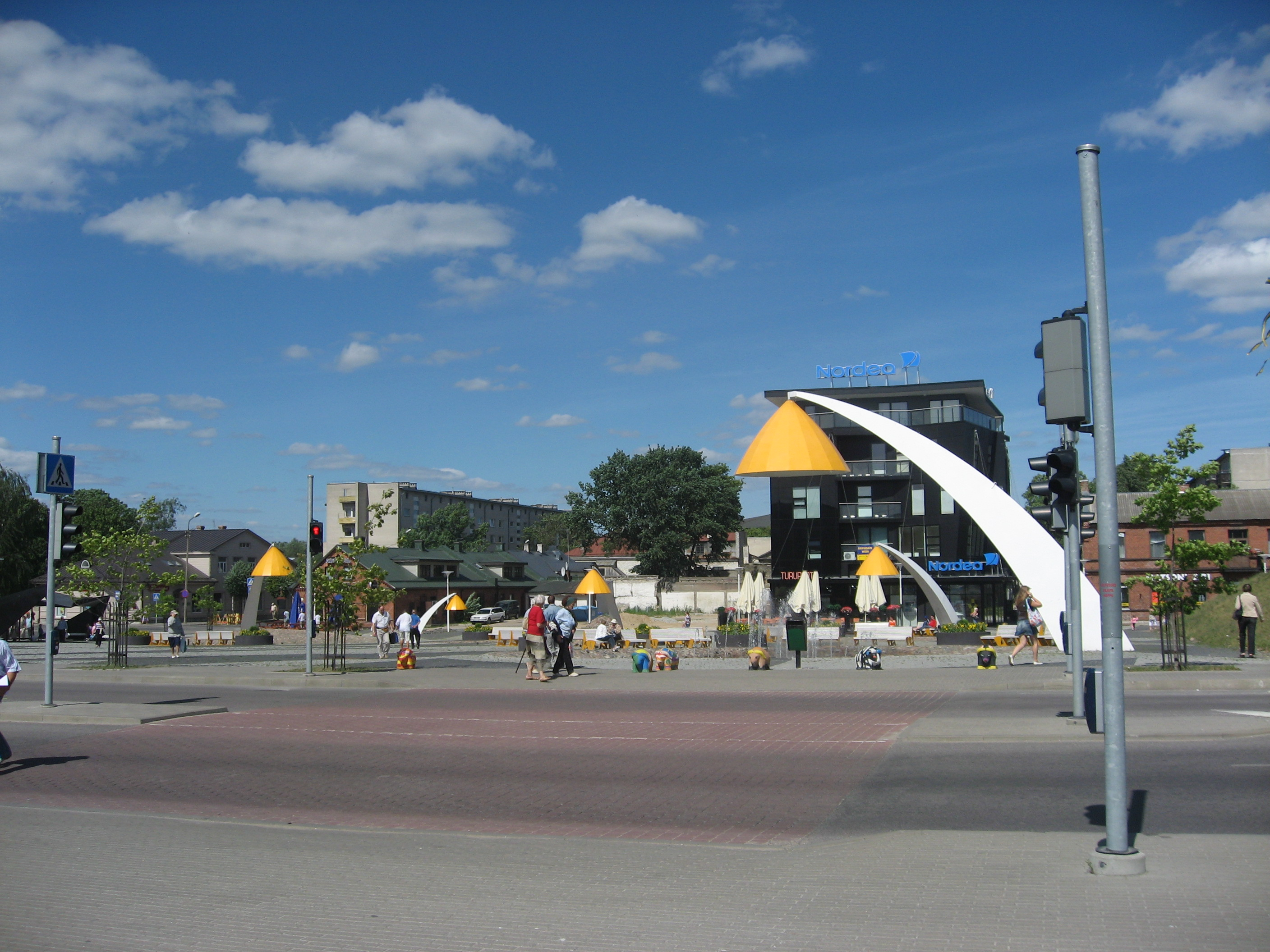
Rakvere central square

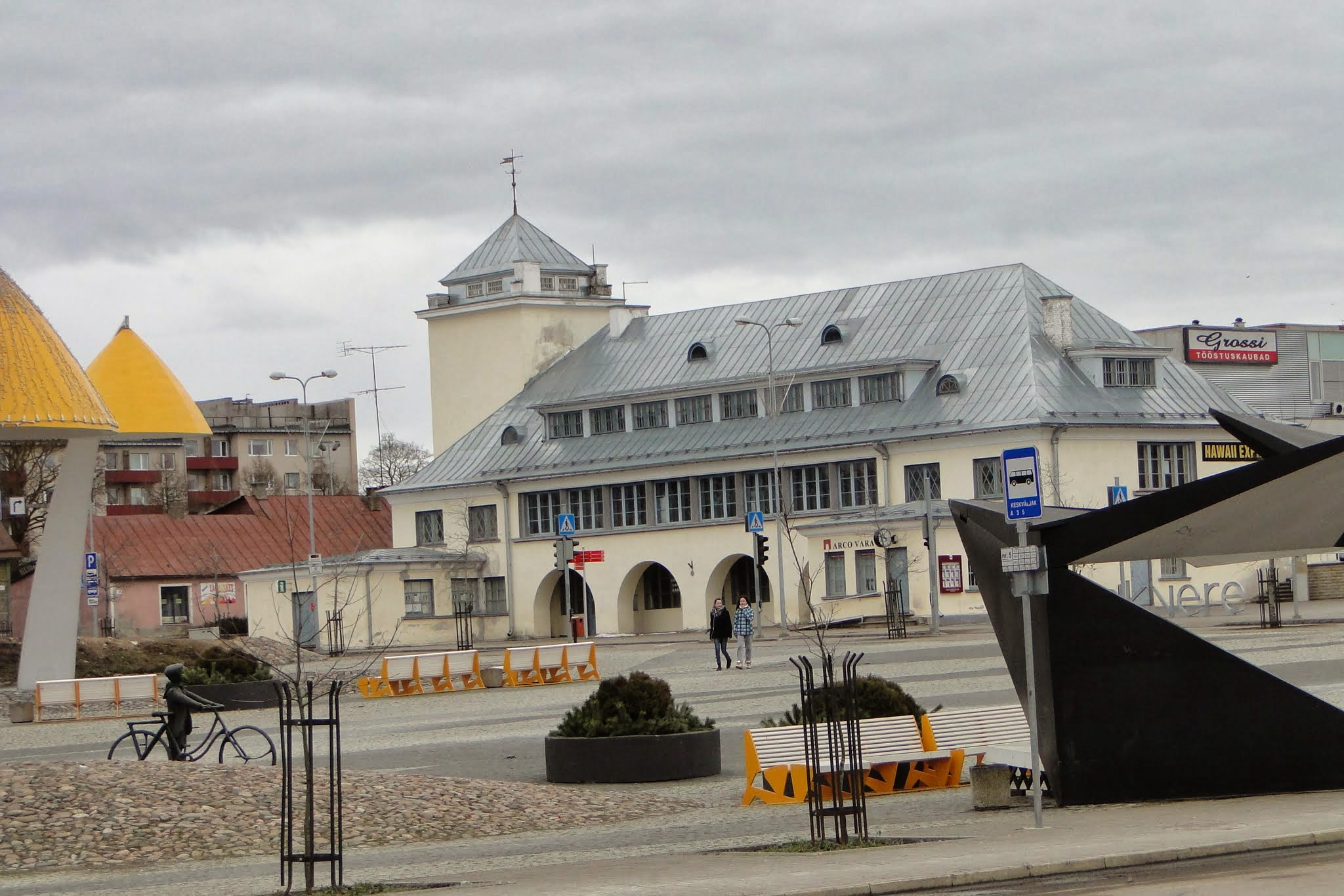
Rakvere central square with market building

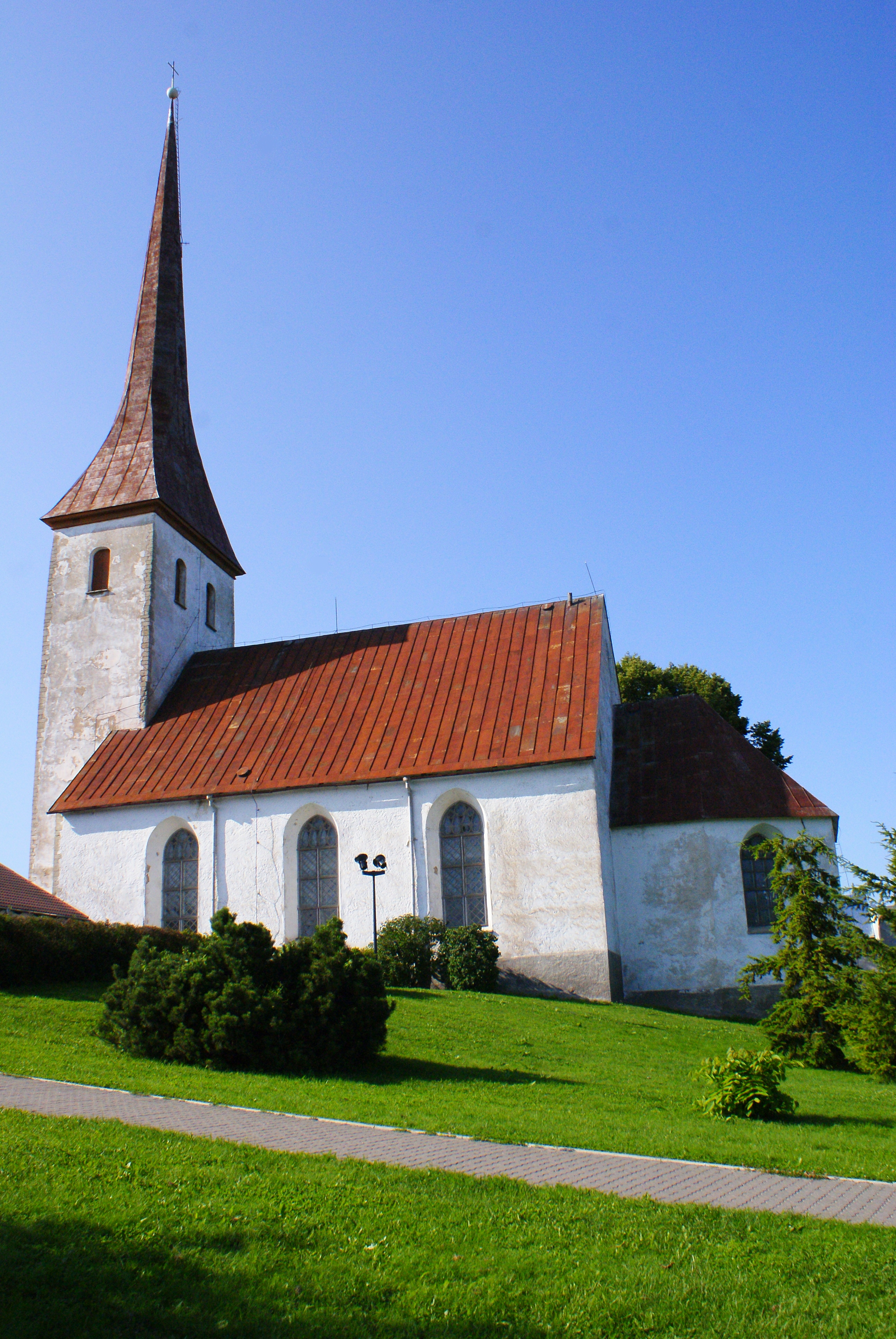
Rakvere Trinity Church

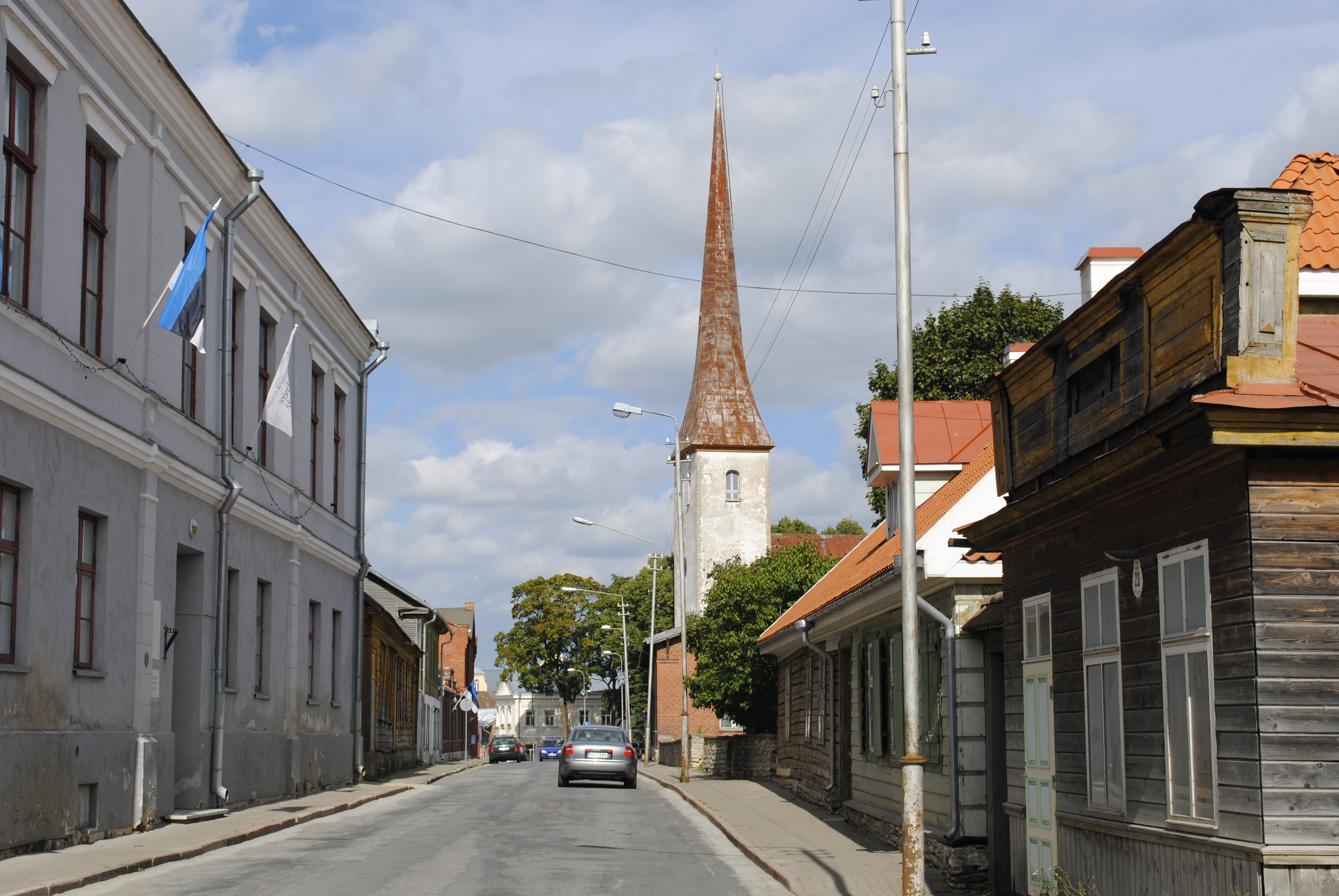
Pikk Street with Trinity Church

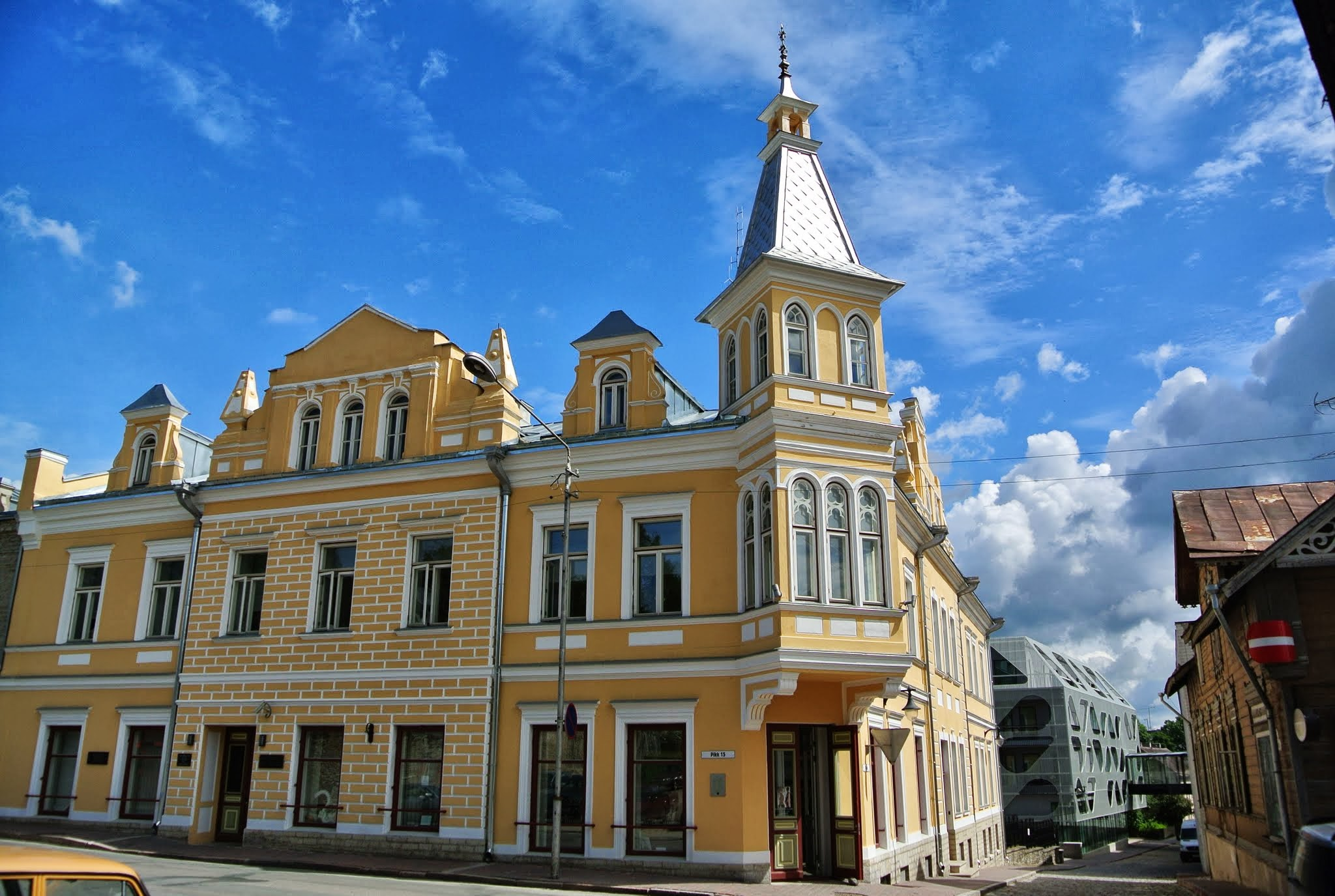
Buildings on Pikk Street

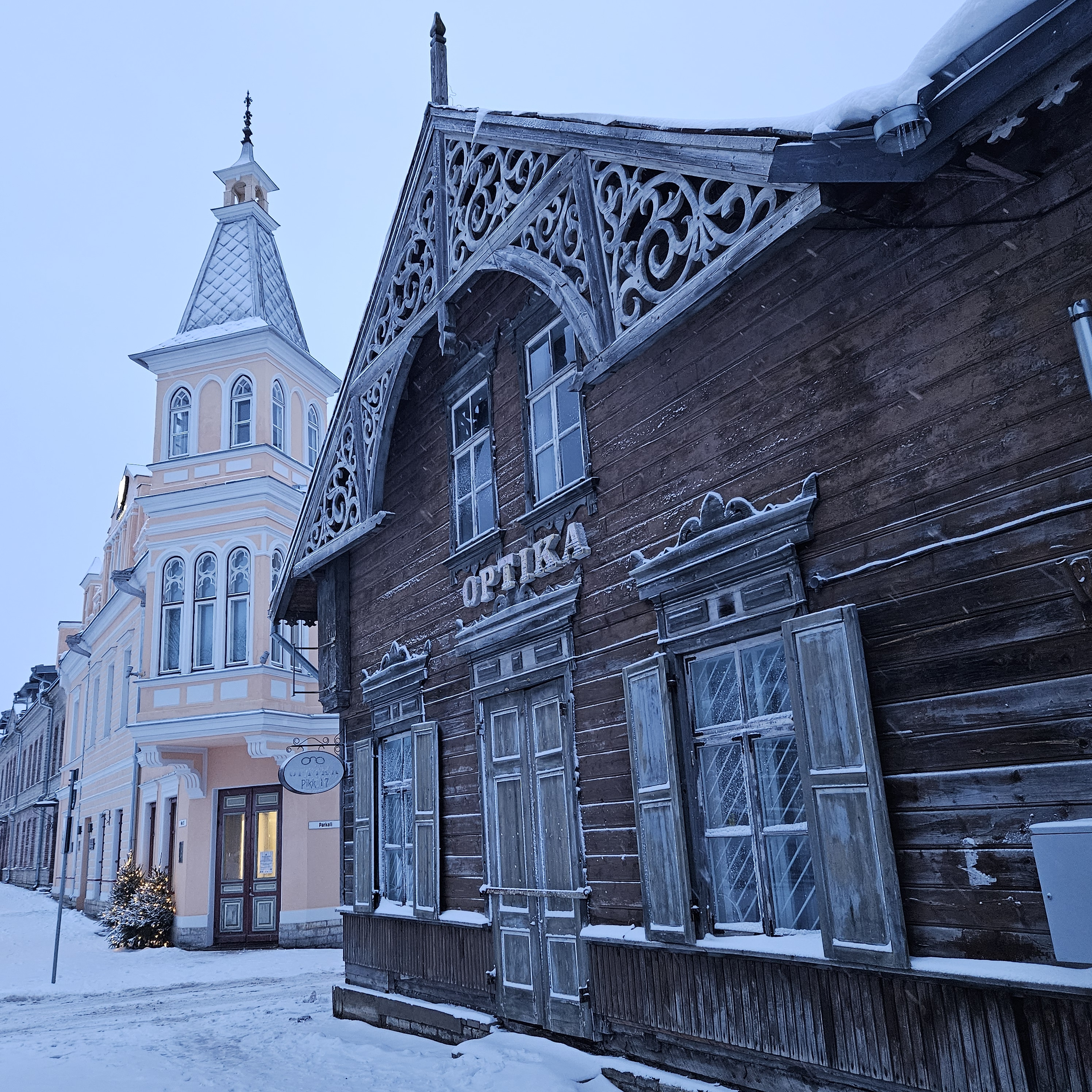
Pikk Street Winter 2024

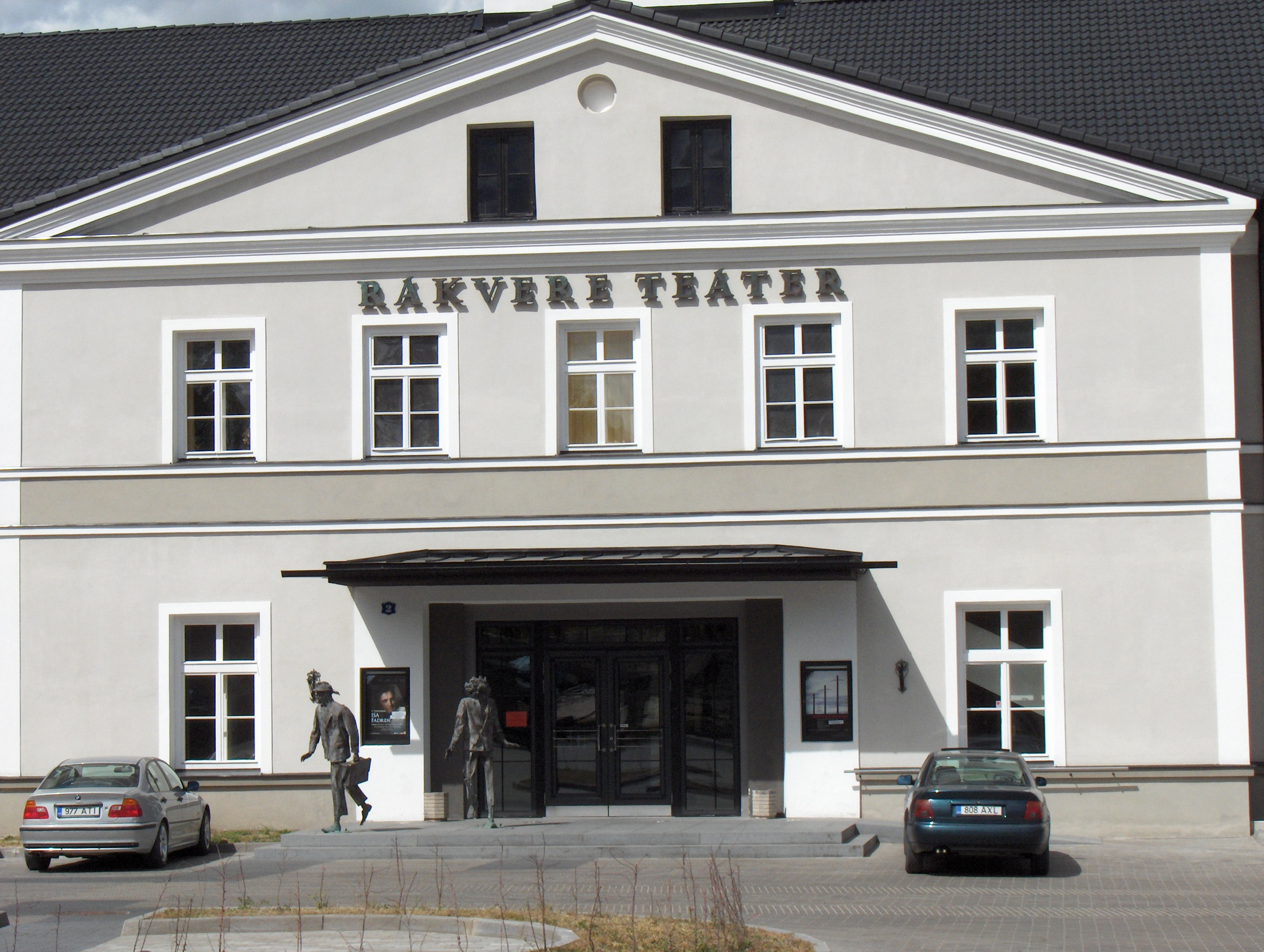
Rakvere Theatre

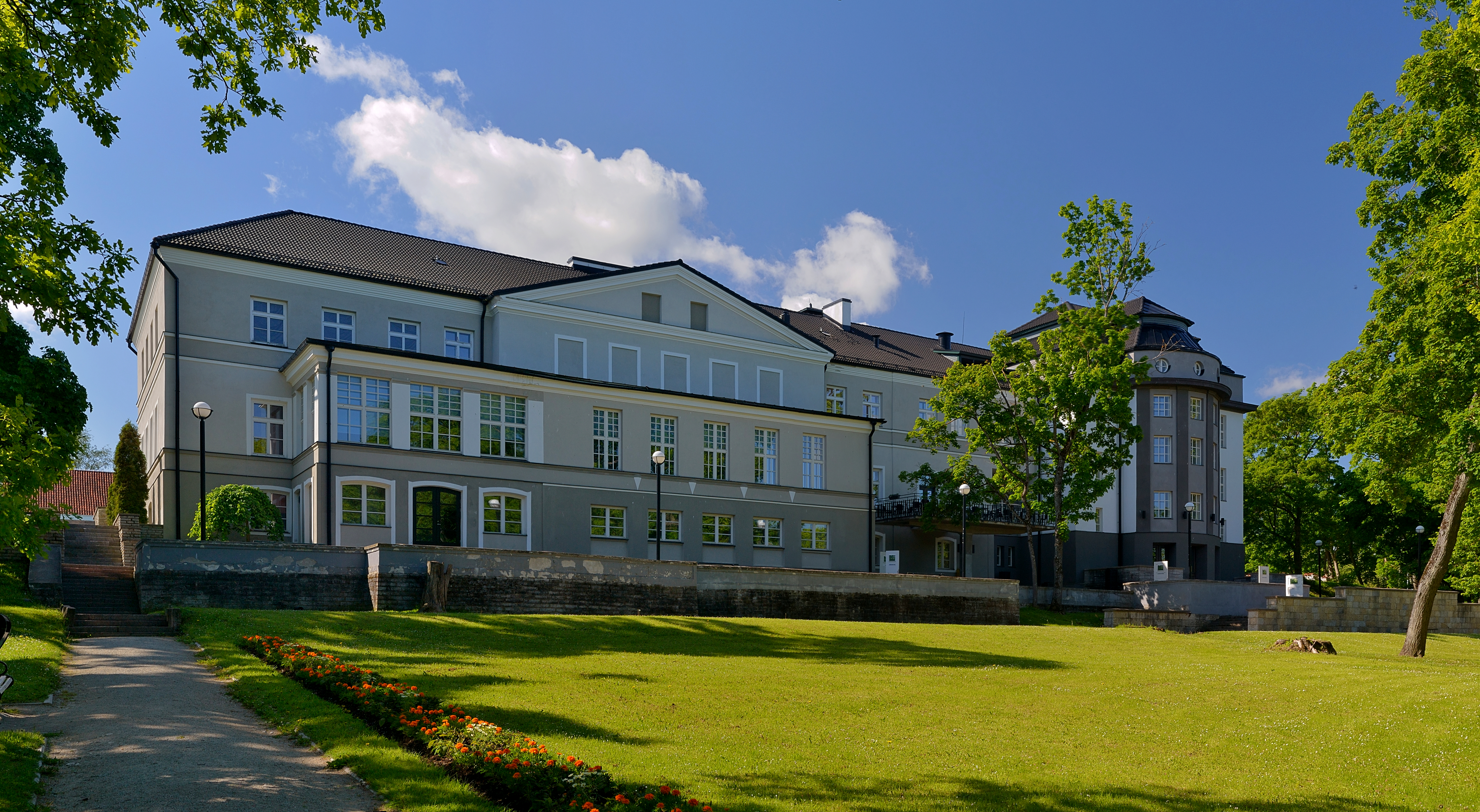
Rakvere Manorhouse and Theatre

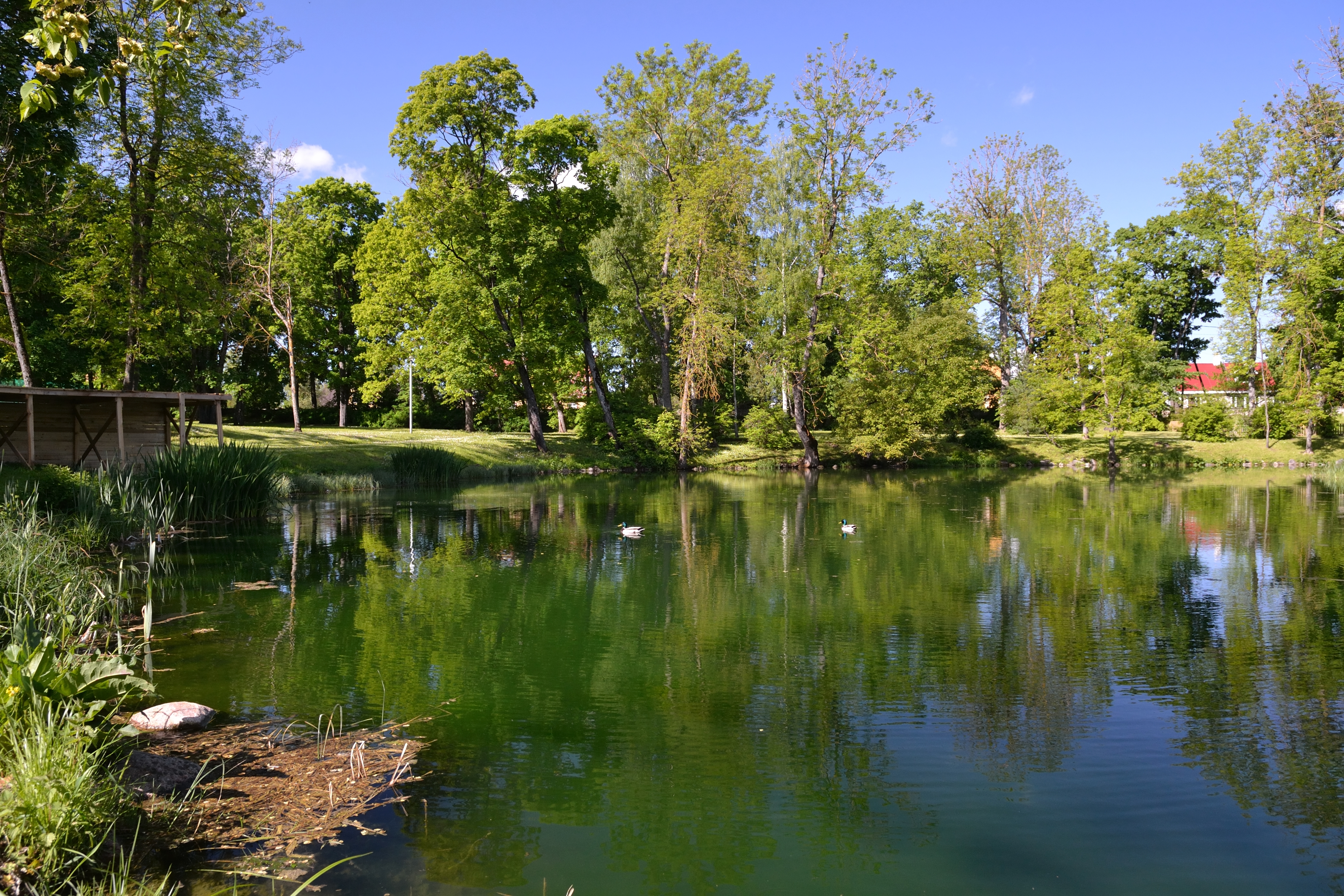
Rakvere Manorhouse Park

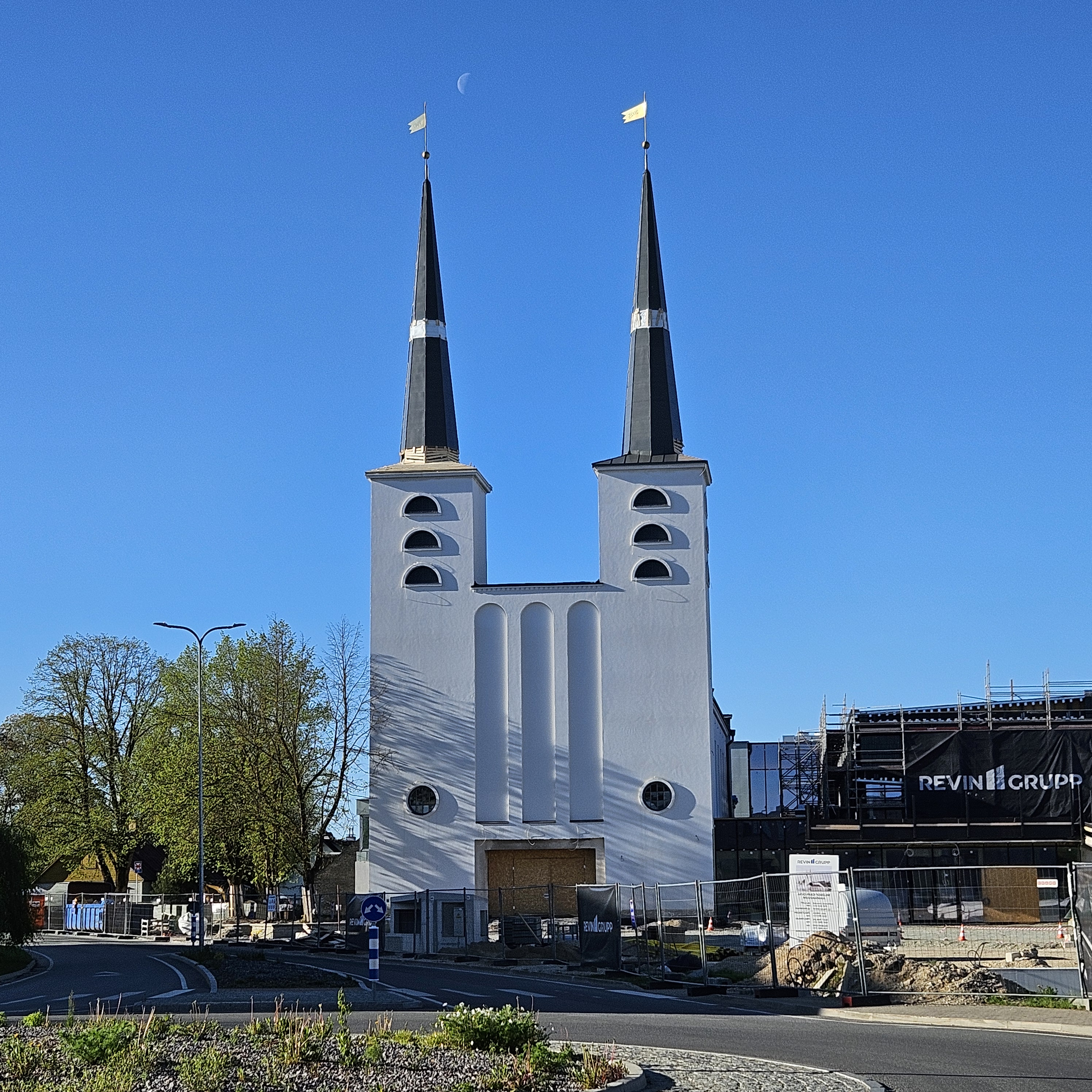
St. Paul's Church with Two Spires (April 2025)

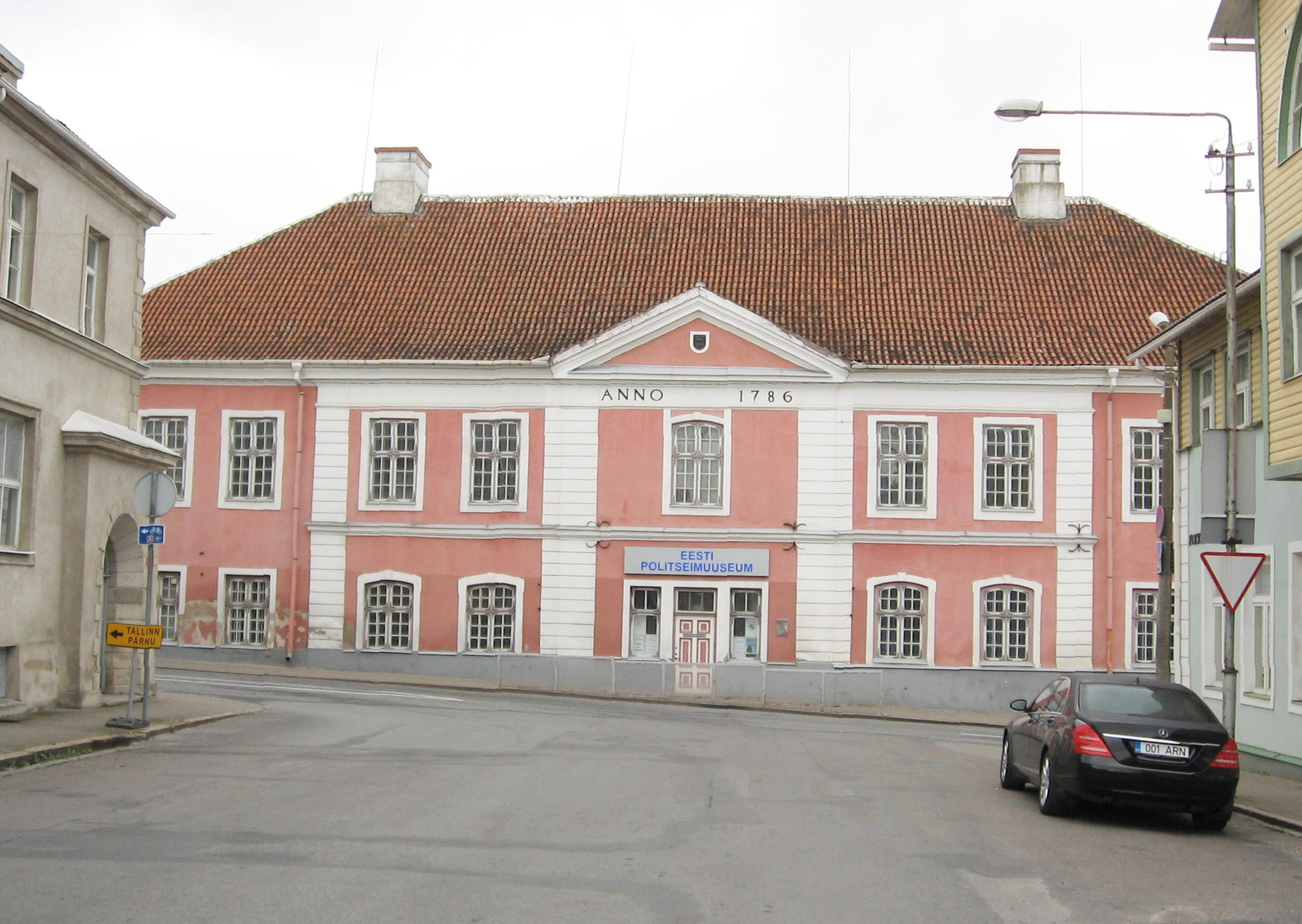
Estonian Police Museum

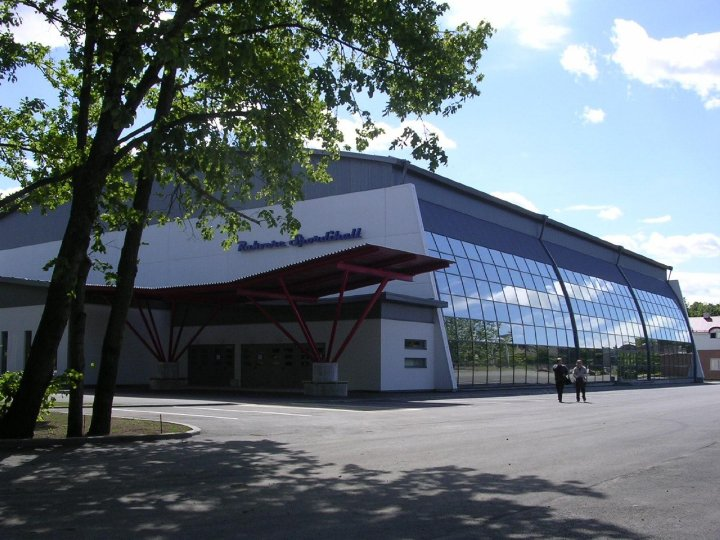
Rakvere Sports Hall

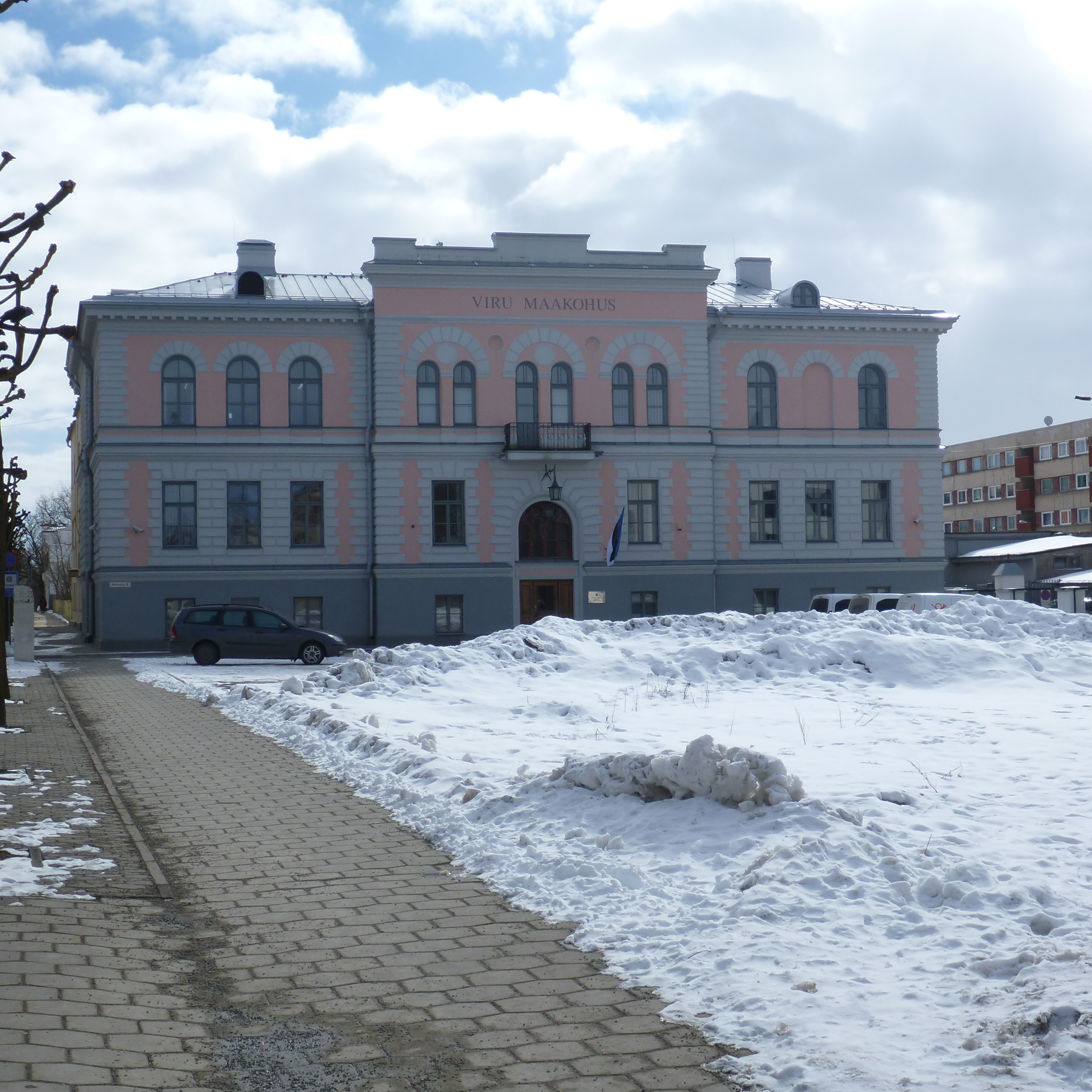
Rakvere County Courthouse
