= Armastuse ämblik =

2003 album by Urmas Alender

Compilation album by Urmas Alender
- Released: 29 December 2003
- Genre: Folk rock
- Length: 54:14
- Label: hyper.records
- Producer: Yoko Alender-Leht

Urmas Alender chronology
Kohtumine Albertiga (2003)	Armastuse ämblik (2003)

Armastuse ämblik (Love spider) is a compilation album by Estonian rock musician Urmas Alender, coupled with Kohtumine Albertiga. It was previously released with Kohtumine Albertiga on the box set Kohtumine Albertiga.

The album is by tracks 7–18 a re-release of Hingelind, plus there are various other songs added.

== Track listing ==
1. "Paaria" (Pariah) (Urmas Alender/Heiti Talvik) – 1:12
2. "Laupäev naisega" (Saturday with the woman) (Urmas Alender/Jüri Üdi) – 3:14
3. "Sina pikajuukseline!" (You long-haired!) (Urmas Alender/Rudolf Rimmel) – 1:35
4. "Kevade" (Spring) (Urmas Alender/Marje Teslon) – 2:58
5. "Kui kaua veel" (How much longer) (Urmas Alender/Urmas Alender) – 3:34
6. "Öine vahetus" (Night shift) (Urmas Alender/Ott Arder) – 3:06
7. "On kui kevad" (As it's spring) (Urmas Alender/Virve Osila) – 2:54
8. "Sa ütlesid: näkku ei lööda" (You said: no hitting in the face) (Urmas Alender/Virve Osila) – 2:16
9. "Solaarne" (untranslatable) (Urmas Alender/Virve Osila) – 3:03
10. "Suvenukrus" (Summer sadness) (Urmas Alender/Virve Osila) – 2:17
11. "Kohtumine" (Meeting) (Urmas Alender/Virve Osila) – 2:25
12. "Mereigatsus" (Sea yearning) (Urmas Alender/Virve Osila) – 2:46
13. "Unenägu" (A dream) (Urmas Alender/Virve Osila) – 1:15
14. "Vihmane ja talvekauge" (Rainy and winter distant) (Urmas Alender/Virve Osila) – 5:25
15. "Neoonist silmad külmas kivilinnas" (Neon eyes in a cold stone city) (Urmas Alender/Virve Osila) – 2:11
16. "Lummus" (Enchanted) (Urmas Alender/Virve Osila) – 3:00
17. "Lootuses" (In hope) (Urmas Alender/Virve Osila) – 2:21
18. "Elame veel" (We live more) (Urmas Alender/Virve Osila) – 2:36
19. "Mõtisklus" (Contemplation) (Gennadi Podelski/Heldur Karmo) – 1:45
20. "Metsluiged (Vennad luiged)" (Wild swans (Brothers swans)) (Rene Eespere/Leelo Tungal) – 3:29
