= Yoko Alender =

Estonian architect and politician (born 1979)

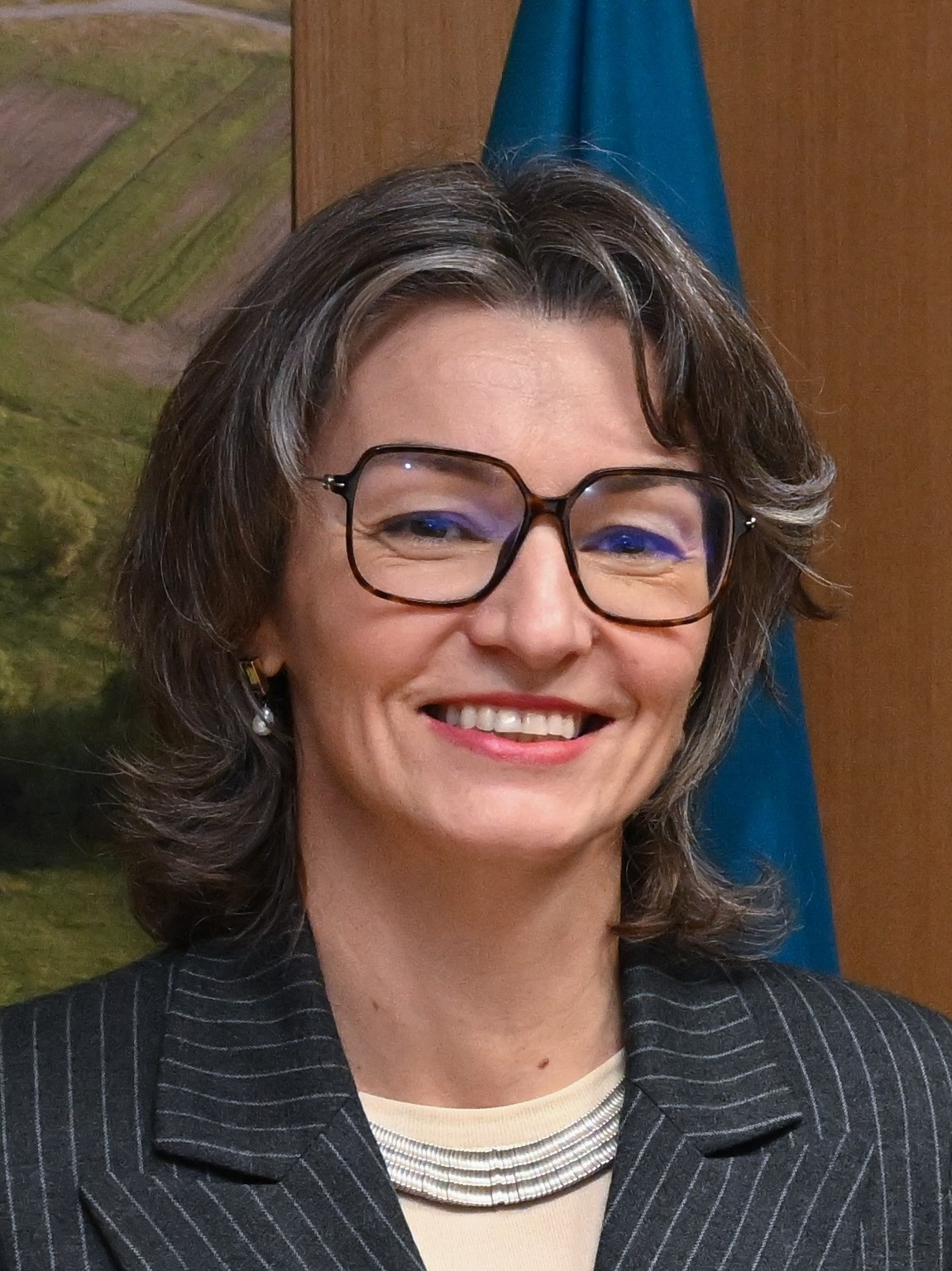
- Alender in 2024

Minister of Climate
- In office 23 July 2024 – 25 March 2025
- Prime Minister: Kristen Michal
- Preceded by: Kristen Michal
- Succeeded by: Andres Sutt

Member of the Riigikogu
- Incumbent
- Assumed office 30 March 2015

Member of the Tallinn City Council
- In office 15 October 2017 – 3 March 2018
- In office 20 October 2013 – 30 March 2015

Personal details
- Born: Yoko Alender; 13 June 1979 (age 47) Tallinn, then part of Estonian SSR, Soviet Union
- Party: Estonian Reform Party (2014–present)
- Other political affiliations: Isamaa (2013–2014)
- Spouse: Priit Juurmann
- Children: 4
- Parent: Urmas Alender (father)
- Education: Estonian Academy of Arts
- Occupation: Architect • Politician

Yoko Alender (born 13 June 1979) is an Estonian architect and politician, member of the XIII, XIV and XV Riigikogu, publisher, educator. Yoko Alender is standing as a candidate in the June 2024 European Parliament elections on the Reform Party list.

== Biography ==
Yoko Alender studied at Tallinn 7th Secondary School 1986–1989, Estonian School in Stockholm 1989–1995, Södra Latin Gymnasium in 1995–1999. From 1999–2010 she studied at the Estonian Academy of Arts in the Department of Architecture and Urban Planning, graduating as a Master of Architecture, and from 2022 she continues her doctoral studies in alternative identities of architects.

In 2001–2004 she was a founding member and member of the board of the production company Kultorg OÜ; in 2005–2006 she was a founding member and member of the board of the architecture and production company ZiZi & YoYo OÜ, architect-project manager; in 2006–2007 she was the architect-project manager of Urbanmark OÜ.

From 2008 to 2012, she worked at the Tallinn Cultural Heritage Authority as the head of the Department of Heritage Protection and Milieu Areas. From 2012 to 2014, she was an architectural and design advisor at the Ministry of Culture.

Since 2012, she has been a member of the board of Yoko Oma OÜ.

She has also been a member of the boards of AS Riigi Kinnisvara and the National Library of Estonia and the State Forest Management Centre, and since 2021 she has been a member of the board of the Estonian-Swedish Cooperation Fund.

== Political activity ==
Yoko Alender has been a member of the Reform Party since 2014, and is a member of the XIII, XIV and XV Riigikogu callings. She was a member of the Culture Committee in the 13th Riigikogu and Vice-Chair and Chair of the Environment Committee in the 14th. Since April 2023, Yoko Alender has been Vice-Chair of the Reform Party faction and member of the Environment Committee.

She was a member of Tallinn City Council in 2013-2015 and 2017-2018. As a member of the Isamaa and Res Publica Union, she was also in 2013 Vice-Chair of the Tallinn City Council, member of the board of the North Tallinn Department, member of the Administrative board of the North Tallinn District and member of the board of the Tallinn Region.

In the 2015 Riigikogu elections, she stood as a candidate in electoral district №. 4 on the list of the Estonian Reform Party. She received 2,715 votes, was elected and was a member of the 13th Riigikogu. In 2019, he was also the Vice-Chairman of the Culture Committee of the Riigikogu. She was a member of the 4th Riigikogu in 2015.

In the 2019 Riigikogu elections, she stood in electoral district №. 5, received 997 votes and was elected. From 2019 to 2021, she was Vice-Chairman of the Environment Committee of the Riigikogu, and since 2021 she has been its Chairman. She was also the Deputy Chairman of the Environment Committee of the Riigikogu.

In the 2023 Riigikogu elections, she won 2051 votes in electoral district №. 10 (Tartu) and was elected with a constituency mandate.

In the 2014 European Parliament elections in Estonia, Yoko Alender received 1,633 votes, and in the 2019 European Parliament elections in Estonia, she received 1,739 votes.

== Other activities ==
Yoko Alender has worked as an event and creative project organiser, project manager and spokesperson, publisher and trainer. Yoko Alender has treasured the creative legacy of her father Urmas Alender, published his works (CDs, poetry collections and DVDs, the biographical book "ALENDER" (2020), the poetry collections "Truu Nailonkuu" (2020) and "Elu-sina_mina" (2023) ), organised Urmas Alender's anniversary concerts in 2000. Among others, she was the author of the book "Roostevaba raamat. Ruja" (1999) and the book "ALENDER" (2020). She is also the author of Jan Gehl's "Cities for People" (2015 and 2017) and "How to Study Life in Public Space" (2023), David Sim's "The Soft City" (2022), and Gaia Vince's "The Century of Nomads".

She was one of the founders and a member of the board of the Estonian Institute of Buddhism, established in 2001. She has also worked on Buddhism, yoga, mindfulness and personal development, and conducts trainings.

In 2015, she completed a higher course in national defence.

As of 2019, she is a trainer for the Alliance of Her, an empowerment programme for women politicians of European Liberalism and Democracy of ALDE.

== Personal life ==
She is the daughter of rock singer Urmas Alender. She was named after Yoko Ono, John Lennon's wife, because Urmas admired Lennon. Together with her father, she was a co-writer and singer of the song "My Childhood Hero" (a cover of the Finnish band Miljoonasade's song "Lapsuuden sankarille"), recorded by the band Vanemõde. She is married to Priit Juurmann, aka DJ P. Julm. Yoko's children are Kaarel Bo, Herta Ing, Uma Chantal and Dag Ferdinand.

Together with her husband, Yoko has helped to establish Tallinn venues FHoone, Frank, Frank Underground, Tabac and Fono.
