= VAT Theatre =

Theatre in Tallinn, Estonia

VAT Theatre (Estonian: VAT Teater) is an Estonian theatre which is located in Tallinn, Estonia.

The theatre was established on 1 October 1987. At that time, the theatre was unique in Estonian SSR, because all other theatres were nationalized. There are several explanations for the acronym VAT, e.g. in Estonian these are: Väike Aga Tubli, Väga Akadeemiline Tallinna Teater, Volli, Aare ja Teised, Vängete Aumärkidega Tunnustamata, Väga Armas Teater. The first head of the theatre was Peeter Jalakas.
