= Tiit Haagma =

Estonian sailor and musician (1954–2021)

Tiit Haagma (5 April 1954 – 27 May 2021) was an Estonian sailor and musician.

He was born in Tallinn.

He started his sailing exercising in 1961, coached by Enn Metsar, and Peeter Leola. In 1984 he won World Championships in Ice Sailing (DN-class). He was 8-times Estonian champion: 1 time (1986) in ice sailing, and 7 times (1988–2004) in open sea sailing.

In 1984 he was named as Estonian Athlete of the Year.

He was also a musician. 1972–1986 he played bass guitar at the musical groups Varjud, and Ruja.
