= Veronika Kivisilla =

Estonian poet (born 1978)

- Veronika Kivisilla at HeadRead in 2018
- Born: Tallinn, Estonia
- Education: Tallinn University
- Notable work: Kallis kalender (2011); Cantus Firmus (2015); Kuni armastus peale tuleb (2018); and Salutatio (2019)

Veronika Kivisilla (née Savi; born 21 December 1978) is an Estonian poet and literary critic, possibly best known for her publications Kallis kalender (2011), Cantus Firmus (2015), Kuni armastus peale tuleb (2018), and Salutatio (2019).

== Early life and education ==
Veronika Kivisilla was born Veronika Savi in Tallinn, where she attended primary and secondary schools. After graduating secondary school in 1997, she enrolled at Tallinn University, majoring in Estonian language and literature, graduating in 2001. Afterwards, she worked as a schoolteacher in Rocca al Mare and Laagri for several years.

Kivisilla, Veronika.IMG 7158

== Career ==
Kivisilla's first poems were published in Looming, Estonia's oldest literary magazine. Her first volume of poetry, Kallis kalender (Dear Calendar) was published in 2011. This was followed in 2012, by the publication of Veronica officinalis. Kivisilla's poetry has been described as keen elaborations of everyday observations and meaningfulness of small and practical affairs that are close to compact prose.

Kivisilla is also an active literary critic and has published essays on Ellen Niit and Kalju Kruusa, among others. She has also written textbooks. She has a special interest in Estonian music culture.

In 2006, she was awarded a Literary Prize by the Cultural Endowment of Estonia. She has been a member of the Estonian Writers Union since 2012, and has acted as the organization's association's project manager, and has been is responsible for literary events and conferences.

== Bibliography ==
=== Books of poetry ===
- Kallis kalender (luuletusi 2009-2010) (2011)
- Veronica officinalis: kirjutatud Ärapääskülas, Valgesoos, elektrirongis ning nr 10 ja 18 bussis (2012)
- Cantus Firmus (2015)
- Salutatio! (2019)
- Kolm sõlme (2020, with Adam Cullen and Øyvind Rangøy)

=== Short prose ===
- Kuni armastus peale tuleb (2018)
- Kuni armastus peale tuleb 2.0 (2020)

=== Varia ===
- Raeapteegi taimelood (2019)
