= Ruja =

Estonian musical group

- Origin: Tallinn, Estonian Soviet Socialist Republic, (Now Tallinn, Estonia)
- Genres: Progressive rock, psychedelic rock, hard rock, folk rock, rockabilly, pop rock
- Years active: 1971–1988; 1994
- Labels: Melodiya
- Past members: Urmas Alender; Jaanus Nõgisto; Tiit Haagma; Rein Rannap; Andrus Vaht; Toomas Veenre; Andres Põldroo; Priit Kuulberg; Margus Kappel; Ivo Varts; Jaan Karp; Indrek Patte; Igor Garšnek; Toomas Rull; Rein Joasoo; Arvo Urb; S.P. Gulliver; Nevil Blumberg; Raul Jaanson

Ruja was one of the foremost Estonian rock bands of the 1970s and 1980s. The name of the band comes from a neologism "ruja", for science fiction, though there are people who believe that "ruja" is actually made up of the first letters of the band's important members (R – Rein Rannap, U – Urmas Alender, J – Jaanus Nõgisto and A – Andrus Vaht). The band released their first and self-titled album in 1979. Many of the original melodies of Ruja were composed by Rein Rannap.

The band was created by Rein Rannap in 1971 while in the 11th grade. Ruja's 3 first members were Rein Rannap, Urmas Alender and Andrus Vaht.

On September 28, 1994, the band's lead singer, Urmas Alender, died in the sinking of passenger ferry M/S Estonia. After Alender's funeral concert a couple of days later, the remaining members of the band decided never to perform under the name of "Ruja" again.

== Members ==
=== 1971–1975 ===
- Urmas Alender (vocals)
- Jaanus Nõgisto (guitar)
- Tiit Haagma (bass)
- Rein Rannap (keyboards)
- Andrus Vaht (drums)
- Toomas Veenre (guitar)
- Andres Põldroo (guitar)

=== 1975–1978 ===
- Urmas Alender (vocals)
- Jaanus Nõgisto (guitar)
- Tiit Haagma (bass)
- Priit Kuulberg (bass 1978–1980)
- Margus Kappel (keyboards, 12-string guitar)
- Andrus Vaht (drums)
- Ivo Varts (drums 1978–1980)

=== 1980–1983 ===
- Urmas Alender (vocals)
- Jaanus Nõgisto (guitar)
- Tiit Haagma (bass)
- Rein Rannap (keyboards)
- Jaan Karp (drums)

=== 1985–1988 ===
- Urmas Alender (vocals)
- Indrek Patte (vocals 1987)
- Jaanus Nõgisto (guitar)
- Tiit Haagma (bass 1985–1986)
- Igor Garšnek (keyboards)
- Toomas Rull (drums, vocals 1985–1986)
- Rein Joasoo (drums, 1986–1986)
- Arvo Urb (drums 1987–1988)
- S.P. Gulliver (bass 1987–1988)
- Nevil Blumberg (guitar 1988)
- Raul Jaanson (guitar 1988)

== Discography ==
- Ruja (EP) (1979)
- Ruja (LP) (1982)
- Kivi veereb (1987)
- Pust budet vsjo (1989)
- Must lind (1994)
- Need ei vaata tagasi... Osa 1 (1999)
- Need ei vaata tagasi... Osa 2 (1999)

=== Videos ===
- "Rujavisioon" (1999). Video cassette (VHS)
