= Baltoscandal =

Theatre festival in Estonia

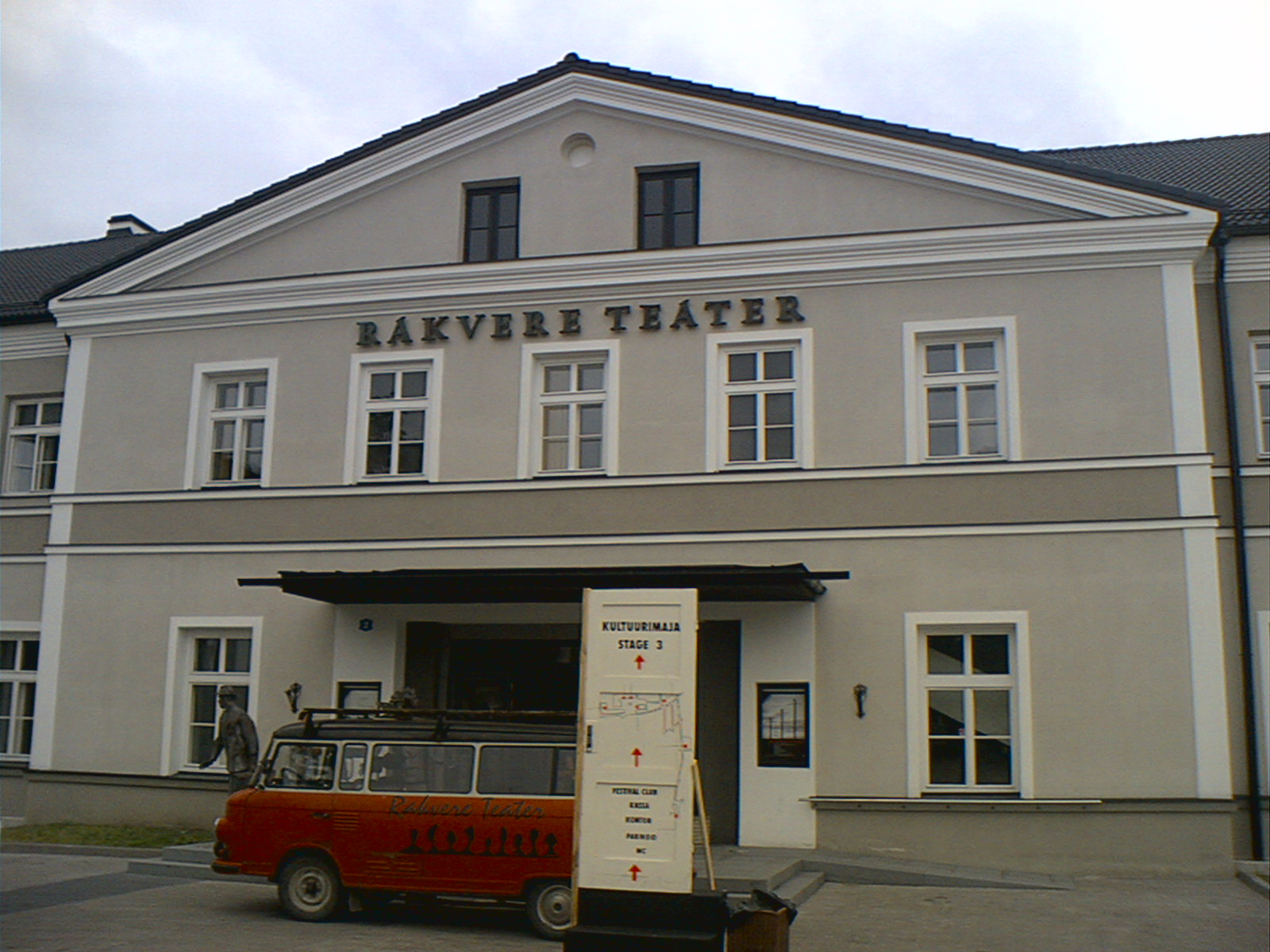
Rakvere Theatre at the moment of Baltoscandal (2006)

Baltoscandal is an international theatre festival, which takes place every two years in Estonia. The first two festivals took place in 1990 and 1992 in Pärnu. Since 1994, the festival has taken place in Rakvere in June or July.

The festival was founded by Von Krahl Theatre and Rakvere Theatre. It is the biggest international theatre festival in Estonia and the oldest in the three Baltic countries.

The main purpose of Baltoscandal is to introduce different, unconventional, and innovative theatre to Estonian audiences. The festival showcases innovative and non-mainstream theatrical forms that also set trends for the performing arts more broadly.

In 2024, Baltoscandal celebrated its 30th anniversary in Rakvere. Performers represented 10 different countries plus Estonia. They were:

- Johhan Rosenberg / Von Krahli Teater - Post-summer Choir (Järelsuve Koor) (Estonia)
- Marta Aliide Jakovski / Von Krahli Teater - Fundamentalist (Estonia)
- Miet Warlop - After All Springville (Belgium)
- Susie Wang - Burnt Toast (Norway)
- Wauhaus - The Companion (Finland)
- Ivo Dimchev - Selfie Concert (Bulgaria)
- Robert Henke - CBM 8032 AV (Germany)
- Täpp / Paiste / Kuusk / Kala / Bartels / Seppik / - In Sickness and Health (Estonia)
- Branko Jordan / Katarina Stegnar / Primož Bezjak / Mart Kangro / Juhan Ulfsak / Eero Epner - Fun Fact (Estonia, Slovenia)
- Florian Malzacher - The Art of Assembly: Political Theatre Today (book) (Germany)
- Back to Back Theatre - Shadow (film) (Australia)
- Lawrence Malstaf - Shrink (Belgium)
- Laura Kutkaitė / Leedu Rahvusteater - The Silence of the Sirens (Lithuania)
- Andrea Salustri - Materia (Italy)
- Philippe Quesne / Vivarium Studio - Farma Fatale (France)
