= Jaanus Nõgisto =

Estonian guitarist

Jaanus Nõgisto (born 21 January 1956 in Tallinn) is an Estonian director, producer, composer and guitarist.

Since 1982, he worked at Eesti Televisioon as the director of music and entertainment programs. In 2000, he created his own production company Reklaamirebased.

He has been a member of several bands:

- Aatomitriikraud (1972–1973)
- Ruja (1973–1988)
- In Spe (1980–1982)
- Con Amores B (1985)
- Led R (2003)
- Jaanus Nõgisto ja Tõnu Timm.

In 2012, he was awarded by the Order of the White Star, V Class.
