= Urmas Alender =

Estonian singer and musician (1953–1994)

- Born: Urmas Alender; 22 November 1953; Tallinn, then part of Estonian SSR, Soviet Union
- Died: 28 September 1994 (aged 40) Baltic Sea
- Genres: Rock; Progressive rock Folk rock Punk rock
- Occupations: Vocalist
- Instruments: Vocals
- Years active: 1969–1994
- Formerly of: Shades (1969–1970); Andromeeda (1971–1974); Teravik (1973–1976); Data (1988–1989); Propeller (1979–1980); Ruja (1971–1988); Kaseke (1983)

Urmas Alender (22 November 1953 – 28 September 1994) was an Estonian singer and musician, the vocalist of popular Estonian bands Ruja and Propeller.

Born in Tallinn, Estonian Soviet Socialist Republic (see Occupation of the Baltic states), Alender began his musical career in the rock band Shades in 1969 but left the following year to become the vocalist for Andromeeda.

In 1971, Alender fronted the progressive rock band Ruja with pianist Rein Rannap. The band was influenced by Western acts such as Genesis, Yes, Emerson, Lake & Palmer and King Crimson, and often incorporated the poetry of Estonian writers Juhan Viiding and Ott Arder into the lyrics. The band was nationally commercially successful. Alender would remain with the band until its demise in 1988.

From 1979 until 1980, Urmas Alender also fronted the Estonian punk rock band Propeller. Other bands Alender performed with were Teravik (1973–1976), and Data (1988–1989), and in 1983, he briefly played in an outfit called Kaseke.

In 1987, Alender appeared in the Estonian rockumentary Pingul keel (Tightened String) alongside popular Estonian musicians Tõnis Mägi, Ivo Linna and Anne Veski.

After years of being harassed by the Soviet KGB and other local authorities, Alender temporarily emigrated to Sweden in 1989.

On 28 September 1994, while en route from Tallinn to Stockholm, Sweden, Urmas Alender died when the cruiseferry Estonia sank in the Baltic Sea. He was survived by a daughter, Yoko Alender, and a son, Ion Alender.

In 2003, Liia Sakkos made a documentary about Alender, titled Teisel pool vett (English: On the Other Side of the Water, also a title of a song by Ruja).

== Discography (solo) ==
- Vana kloun (1992)
- Hingelind (1994)
- Kogutud teosed. 1968-1980. Esimene osa. (2000)
- Kogutud teosed. 1981-1993. Teine osa. (2000)
- Kui mind enam ei ole (2001)
- Kohtumine Albertiga (2-CD, 2003)
- Kohtumine Albertiga (2003)
- Armastuse ämblik (2003)
