= Eesti Kullafond =

Estonian series of albums

Eesti Kullafond ('Estonian Gold Foundation') is a series of albums of Estonian classic artists. The albums are recorded by Hitivabrik.

== Albums ==
- Tõnis Mägi (2000, 2CD, HFCD024)
- Tarmo Pihlap (2000, 3CD, HFCD030)
- Mati Nuude (2001, 3CD, HFCD034)
- Ivo Linna (2001, 3CD, HFCD036)
- Vello Orumets (2001, 3CD, HFCD044)
- Gunnar Graps (2002, 3CD, HFCD053)
- Kuldne Trio (2002, 3CD, HFCD055)
- Silvi Vrait (2002, 3CD, HFCD066)
- Joel Friedrich Steinfeldt (2003, 3CD, HFCD074)
- Arne Oit (2003, 2CD, HFCD075)
- Raimond Valgre (2003, 2CD, HFCD082)
- Alo Mattiisen (2004, 3CD, HFCD093)
- Georg Ots (2004, 2CD, HFCD095)
- Karl Madis (2004, 3CD, HFCD096)
- Mait Maltis (2004, 3CD, HFCD098)
- Heli Lääts (2004, 3CD, HFCD101)
- Singer Vinger (2005, 2CD+DVD, HFCD105)
- Anne Veski (2006, 3CD, HFCD107)
- Helgi Sallo (2006, 2CD, HFCD111)
- Kukerpillid (2007, 3CD, HFCD112)
- Olav Ehala (2007, 2CD, HFCD113)
- Kustas Kikerpuu (2007, 2CD, HFCD115)
- Heidy Tamme (2008, 3CD, HFCD119)
- Horoskoop (2008, 3CD, HFCD121)
- Albert Uustulnd (2008, CD+DVD, HFCD122)
- Apelsin (2009, 3CD)
- Artur Rinne (2009, 3CD)
- Jam (2009, 3CD)
- Eino Baskin (2009, 3CD)
- Kalmer Tennosaar (2010, 3CD)
- Eesti Filmimuusika (2010, 2CD)
- Onu Bella (2011, 2CD+DVD)
- Lindpriid (2011, 3CD)
- Lastelaulud (2012, 2CD)
- Folkmill (2012, 3CD)
- Voldemar Kuslap (2012, 2CD)
- Riho Sibul (2012, 3CD)
- Karavan (2013, 3CD)
- Lastele, muinasjutud (2013, 3CD)
- Kihnu Virve (2014, 3CD)
- Polyphon & Consilium (2014, 2CD+DVD)
- Boris Lehtlaan (2014, 3CD)
- Lastele (2015, 3CD)
- Henry Laks (2015, 3CD)
- Untsakad (2015, 3CD)
- Marju Länik (2017, 3CD)
- Rein Rannap (2018, 3CD)

Year	ID	Title	
2000	HFCD024	Tõnis Mägi	2CD
2000	HFCD030	Tarmo Pihlap	3CD
2001	HFCD034	Mati Nuude	3CD
2001	HFCD036	Ivo Linna	3CD
2001	HFCD044	Vello Orumets	3CD
2002	HFCD053	Gunnar Graps	3CD
2002	HFCD055	Kuldne Trio	3CD
2002	HFCD066	Silvi Vrait	3CD
2003	HFCD074	Joel Friedrich Steinfeldt	3CD
2003	HFCD075	Arne Oit	2CD
2003	HFCD082	Raimond Valgre	2CD
2004	HFCD093	Alo Mattiisen	3CD
2004	HFCD095	Georg Ots	2CD
2004	HFCD096	Karl Madis	3CD
2004	HFCD098	Mait Maltis	3CD
2004	HFCD101	Heli Lääts	3CD
2005	HFCD105	Singer Vinger	2CD+DVD
2006	HFCD107	Anne Veski	3CD
2006	HFCD111	Helgi Sallo	2CD
2007	HFCD112	Kukerpillid	3CD
2007	HFCD113	Olav Ehala	2CD
2007	HFCD115	Kustas Kikerpuu	2CD
2008	HFCD119	Heidy Tamme	3CD
2008	HFCD121	Horoskoop	3CD
2008	HFCD122	Albert Uustulnd	CD+DVD
2009	HFCD123	Artur Rinne	3CD
2009	HFCD124	Jam	3CD
2009	HFCD122	Apelsin	3CD
2009	HFCD124	Eino Baskin	3CD
2010	HFCD126	Kalmer Tennosaar	3CD
2010	HFCD130	Eesti filmimuusika	2CD
2011	HFCD133	Onu Bella	2CD+DVD
2011	HFCD135	Lindpriid	3CD
2018	HFCD0181	Rein Rannap	3CD
