= Apelsin =

Estonian band

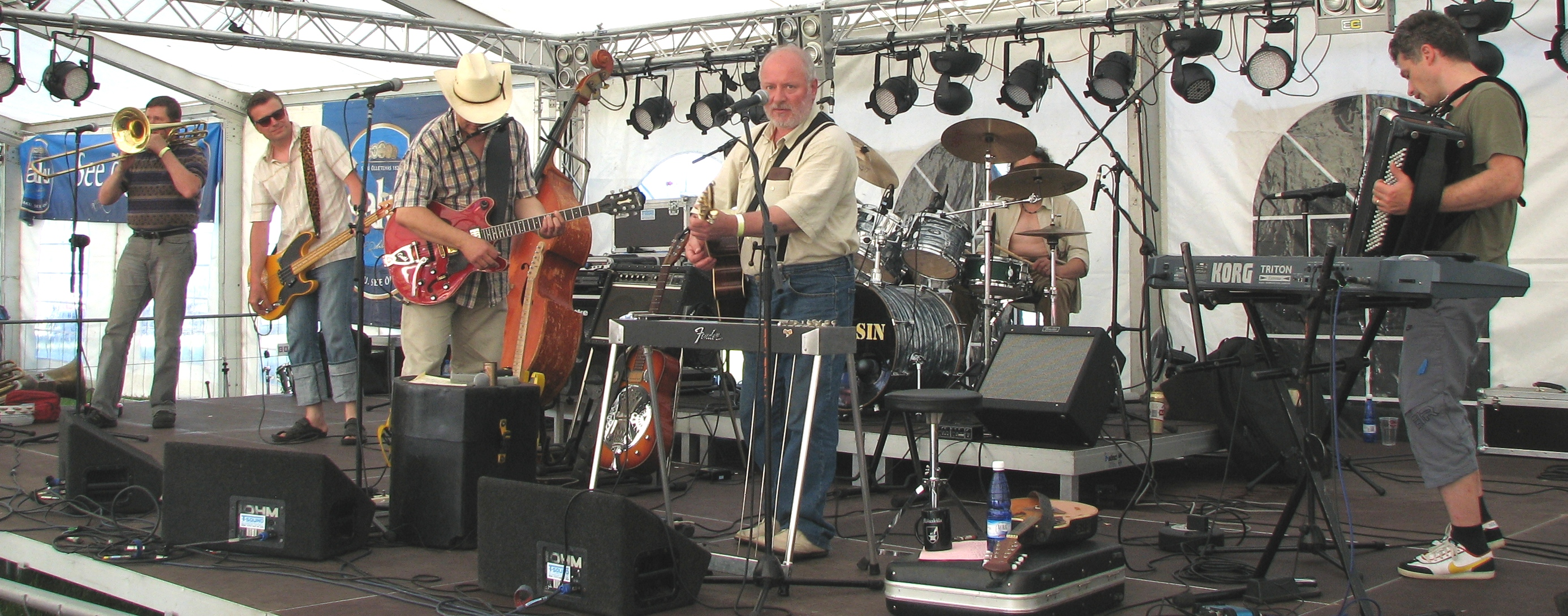
- Band Apelsin live concert in Õlletoober, 2010

Background information
- Origin: Tallinn
- Genre: rock/country/parody
- Years active: 1974–present
- Members: Ants Nuut; Allan Jakobi; Hillar King
- Past members: Tõnu Aare (deceased); Aleksander Vilipere (deceased); Harry Kõrvits; Gunnar Kriik; Ivo Linna; Mati Nuude (deceased); Jaan Arder (deceased)

Apelsin (Estonian for orange) was an Estonian band created in 1974. Their lyrics are in Estonian and Russian. During the Soviet era, their LP albums were issued by the Soviet music monopoly Melodiya. The Russian name of the band was Апельсин. In both Estonian and Russian, the band's name means orange. Many songs and much of the music of the band are satirical. The band's combining music with humor (both onstage and offstage) was one of the reasons the band had become one of the most popular Estonian bands of all time.

In 2016, a book about the band, Tsepeliini triumf: Eesti rock 1970. aastatel (Zeppelin's Triumph: Estonian Rock in the 1970s), was published.

== Members ==
The original lineup consisted of Tõnu Aare, Ants Nuut, Harry Kõrvits and Jaan Arder. In 1975, Gunnar Kriik, Ivo Linna and Mati Nuude joined. During 1989–1999 the band was at its smallest, and three of the founding members, Tõnu, Ants, and Jaan, rarely played together. Jaan had joined the historical music band, Hortus Musicus and Ivo and Harry had joined the band, Rock Hotel.

Other musicians that played with the band: Taago Daniel, Indrek Hiibus, Allan Jakobi, Vello Jurtom, Mart Jürisalu, Hillar King, Meelis Laido, Marek Lillemägi, Viljo Tamm, Andres Loigom, Priit Pihlap, Tarmo Pihlap, Argo Toomel, Vello Toomemets, Igor Trunin, Ivo Varts, Aleksander Vilipere, Ülari Kirsipuu.

== Recent line-up ==
(As of 2006)

- Tõnu Aare – vocal, acoustic & electric guitar, harmonica, bouzouki
- Jaan Arder – vocal, acoustic guitar, mandolin, steel guitar
- Ants Nuut – trombone, tuba, vocal
- Aleksander Vilipere – percussion, vocal
- Allan Jakobi – accordion, keyboard.
- Hillar King – bass

== Apelsin to Jos ==
A Swedish manufacturer of juice, Brämhults Juice, launched an advertising campaign in November 2009 called "Apelsin to Jos", which means literally "Orange to Juice" in Swedish. The slogan is a pun, and the campaign consists of the stunt of sending the band to a Nigerian town called Jos.

== Discography ==
The band released 4 LPs and several CDs.

- Apelsin XX, a 1994 CD released for the 20th anniversary of the band.
- Apelsin Boogie, a 1999 CD released for the 25th anniversary of the band.
- Apelsin № 1, a 2003 CD of 1974 songs. Label: Opus Est
- Apelsin 30, a 30th anniversary CD (2004) Label: Records 2000/Global Music Group

Note that Estonian LPs produced during Soviet rule were customarily credited in parallel in Estonian and in Russian.

=== Apelsin 1980 LP ===
Catalog#: C60-07809

Lineup

- Bass, piano – Gunnar Kriik
- Drums – Harry Kõrvits
- Guitar – Ivo Linna
- Guitar, harmonica – Tõnu Aare
- Trombone, vocals – Ants Nuut
- Violin, vocals – Jaan Arder
- Vocals – Mati Nuude

Side A

- Western (В стиле вестерна) (Tõnu Aare)
- Jambalaya (Джамбалайя) (Hank Williams, Estonian lyrics: Reet Linna)
- Capri saarel (На острове Капри) (melody: Wilhelm Grosz, lyrics: Jimmy Kennedy, Estonian lyrics: Artur Ranne)
- Roosi (Роози) (Folk song – Tõnu Aare)
- Rahvamatk (Туристы в походе) (Tõnu Aare)
- Purjed (Паруса) (Tõnu Aare)

Side B

- Suupillilugu (Губная гармошка) (Tõnu Aare)
- Tuukri Laul (Песня водолаза) (Tõnu Aare – Ott Arder)
- Hommik Keskturul (Утро на рынке) (Tõnu Aare)
- Hop-hopp (Хоп-хоп) (Tõnu Aare – Ott Arder)
- Armurõõm (Восторг любви) (melody: J. Martini, arranged by Jaan Arder, lyrics: unknown)
- Kaks punast huult (Пунцовые уста), tango (Вилольдо)
- Igatsus (Тоска) (Tõnu Aare)
- Suvepäeva rock (Летний рок-н-ролл) (Tõnu Aare)

=== Apelsin 1981 LP ===
Catalog#: C60-15353 / 15978

Side A

- Illusioon (Иллюзия) (Tõnu Aare – Ott Arder)
- See viis (Этот напев) (José Feliciano – Henno Käo)
- Raamid (Рамы) (Gunnar Kriik – Ott Arder)
- Shakespeare (Шекспир) (G. Kajanus – Estonian lyrics Ott Arder)
- Leierkast (Шарманка) (Music & lyrics: Gunnar Kriik)

Side B

- Peeglid (Зеркала) (Gunnar Kriik – Ott Arder)
- Viis viimast (В числе пяти последних) (Joe Dolan /"16 Brothers"/ – Estonial lyrics: Priit Aimla)
- Saatuse laev (Корабль судьбы) (Merle Haggard – Henno Käo)
- Aeg ei peatu (Время не останавливается) (Tõnu Aare – Ott Arder)

=== Apelsin 1988 LP ===
Catalog#: C60-26527-007

Side A

- Matkalaul
- Tartu levi!
- Miks nii kiiresti kõik muutub
- Roolivelled
- Jaaniöö, imede öö

Side B

- Orange blues
- Autoservice
- Keskea rõõmud
- Amorada
- Etüüd Nr. 17
- Popurrii

=== Apelsin 1989 LP ===
Catalog#: С60 29169 009

Lineup

- Виновата бабушка (Granny is to blame) (Mati Nuude – А. Вишневецкий)
- Наступило время (Time has come) (R. Rudolf – Henno Käo)
- Кенгуру (Kangaroo) (И. Трунин – М. Райкин)
- Тико-тико (Tiko-tiko) (Ф. Абреу)
- Болота лени (Marshes of laziness) (Tõnu Aare – В. Сауткин)
- Весёлые соседи (Merry neighbours) (Tõnu Aare – М. Райкин)
- Музыкальный идол (Musical idol) (С. Касторский – Ю. Марцинкевич)
- Кантри (Country) (Ч. Бланк – У. Ванн)
- Эстонский танец (Estonian dance) (Tõnu Aare)
- Песенка туриста (Tourist's song) (Tõnu Aare – Б. Балясный)
- Навстречу ветру (To meet the wind) (Priit Pihlap – Ott Arder)
- Кошачьи заботы (Cat's troubles) (Tõnu Aare – М. Райкин)

=== Krugozor #11, 1978 ===
Catalog#: Г92-07048/1-1 Krugozor was a musical magazine with flexi-discs issued by Melodiya. The issue contained three songs performed by Apelsin:

- Himaalaja, (a cover of Ramaya)
- Western
- Karulaul (English: Bear's song) (a cover of Oh By Jingo!)
