= Arder =

Family name

Arder is an Estonian surname. Notable people with the surname include:

- Jaan Arder (1952–2014), Estonian singer
- Ott Arder (1950–2004), Estonian poet, writer, and translator

== See also ==
- Arden (name)
