= Tuulik =

Tuulik is an Estonian surname meaning windmill. Notable people with the surname include:

- Jüri Tuulik (1940–2014), Estonian writer
- Ülo Tuulik (born 1940), Estonian writer
