= Vahase =

Island in Estonia

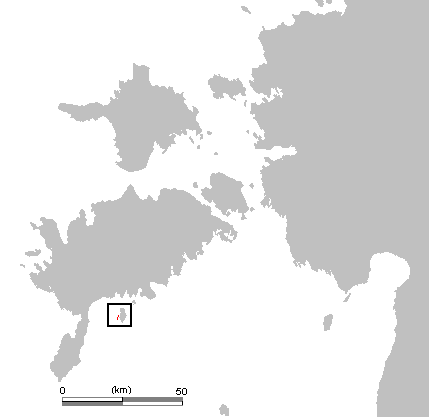
- Vahase in the West Estonian archipelago.

Geography
- Location: Gulf of Riga
- Coordinates: 58°08′N 22°28′E
- Area: 65.52 ha (161.9 acres)
- Coastline: 6.5 km (4.04 mi)
- Highest elevation: 4.3 m (14.1 ft)

Administration
- Estonia
- County: Saare County
- Municipality: Lääne-Saare Parish
- Settlement: Abruka village

Vahase is a 65.52 ha (161.9 acres) Estonian islet in the Gulf of Riga. It is located about 200 m (660 ft) west of the island of Abruka. Administratively Vahase belongs to the Abruka village in Lääne-Saare Parish, Saare County.

Vahase arose from the sea about thousand years ago. The island has a tiny forest with junipers, oaks, and pines.

Because of shallow water Vahase is accessible from Abruka by foot. There is only one farmstead on the island.

Writer Albert Uustulnd has described Vahase in his novel Tuulte tallermaa.

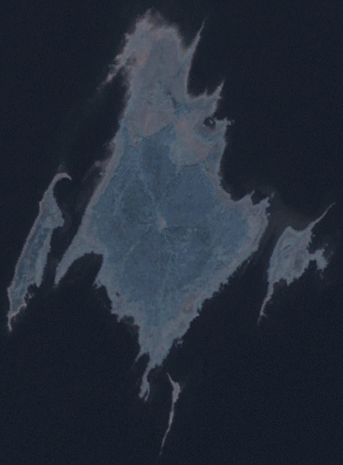
Vahase (left) on the satellite image with neighbouring islands.

== See also ==
- List of islands of Estonia
