= List of number-one hits of 1976 (Italy) =

This is a list of the number-one hits of 1976 on Italian Hit Parade Singles Chart.

Issue date	Song	Artist
January 3	"La tartaruga"	Bruno Lauzi
January 10	"La tartaruga"	Bruno Lauzi
January 17	"La tartaruga"	Bruno Lauzi
January 24	"La tartaruga"	Bruno Lauzi
January 31	"La tartaruga"	Bruno Lauzi
February 7	"La tartaruga"	Bruno Lauzi
February 14	"Sandokan"	Oliver Onions
February 21	"Sandokan"	Oliver Onions
February 28	"Sandokan"	Oliver Onions
March 6	"Sandokan"	Oliver Onions
March 13	"Sandokan"	Oliver Onions
March 20	"Sandokan"	Oliver Onions
March 27	"Sandokan"	Oliver Onions
April 3	"Ancora tu"	Lucio Battisti
April 10	"Ancora tu"	Lucio Battisti
April 17	"Ancora tu"	Lucio Battisti
April 24	"Ancora tu"	Lucio Battisti
May 1	"Ancora tu"	Lucio Battisti
May 8	"Ancora tu"	Lucio Battisti
May 15	"Ancora tu"	Lucio Battisti
May 22	"Ancora tu"	Lucio Battisti
May 29	"Ancora tu"	Lucio Battisti
June 5	"Ancora tu"	Lucio Battisti
June 12	"Ancora tu"	Lucio Battisti
June 19	"Ancora tu"	Lucio Battisti
June 26	"Ramaya"	Afric Simone
July 3	"Ramaya"	Afric Simone
July 10	"Non si può morire dentro"	Gianni Bella
July 17	"Non si può morire dentro"	Gianni Bella
July 24	"Non si può morire dentro"	Gianni Bella
July 31	"Non si può morire dentro"	Gianni Bella
August 7	"Non si può morire dentro"	Gianni Bella
August 14	"Non si può morire dentro"	Gianni Bella
August 21	"Non si può morire dentro"	Gianni Bella
August 28	"Non si può morire dentro"	Gianni Bella
September 4	"Non si può morire dentro"	Gianni Bella
September 11	"Non si può morire dentro"	Gianni Bella
September 18	"Margherita"	Riccardo Cocciante
September 25	"Margherita"	Riccardo Cocciante
October 2	"Margherita"	Riccardo Cocciante
October 9	"Margherita"	Riccardo Cocciante
October 16	"Margherita"	Riccardo Cocciante
October 23	"Margherita"	Riccardo Cocciante
October 30	"Margherita"	Riccardo Cocciante
November 6	"Margherita"	Riccardo Cocciante
November 13	"Margherita"	Riccardo Cocciante
November 20	"Margherita"	Riccardo Cocciante
November 27	"Linda"	Pooh
December 4	"Sei forte papà"	Gianni Morandi
December 11	"Sei forte papà"	Gianni Morandi
December 18	"Sei forte papà"	Gianni Morandi
December 25	"Sei forte papà"	Gianni Morandi

== Number-one artists ==
Position	Artist	Weeks #1
1	Lucio Battisti	12
2	Gianni Bella	10
2	Riccardo Cocciante	10
3	Oliver Onions	7
4	Bruno Lauzi	6
5	Gianni Morandi	4
6	Afric Simone	2
7	Pooh	1

== See also ==
- 1976 in music
