= Allikalahe =

Village in Estonia

Coordinates: 58°27′27″N 23°03′42″E

- Village
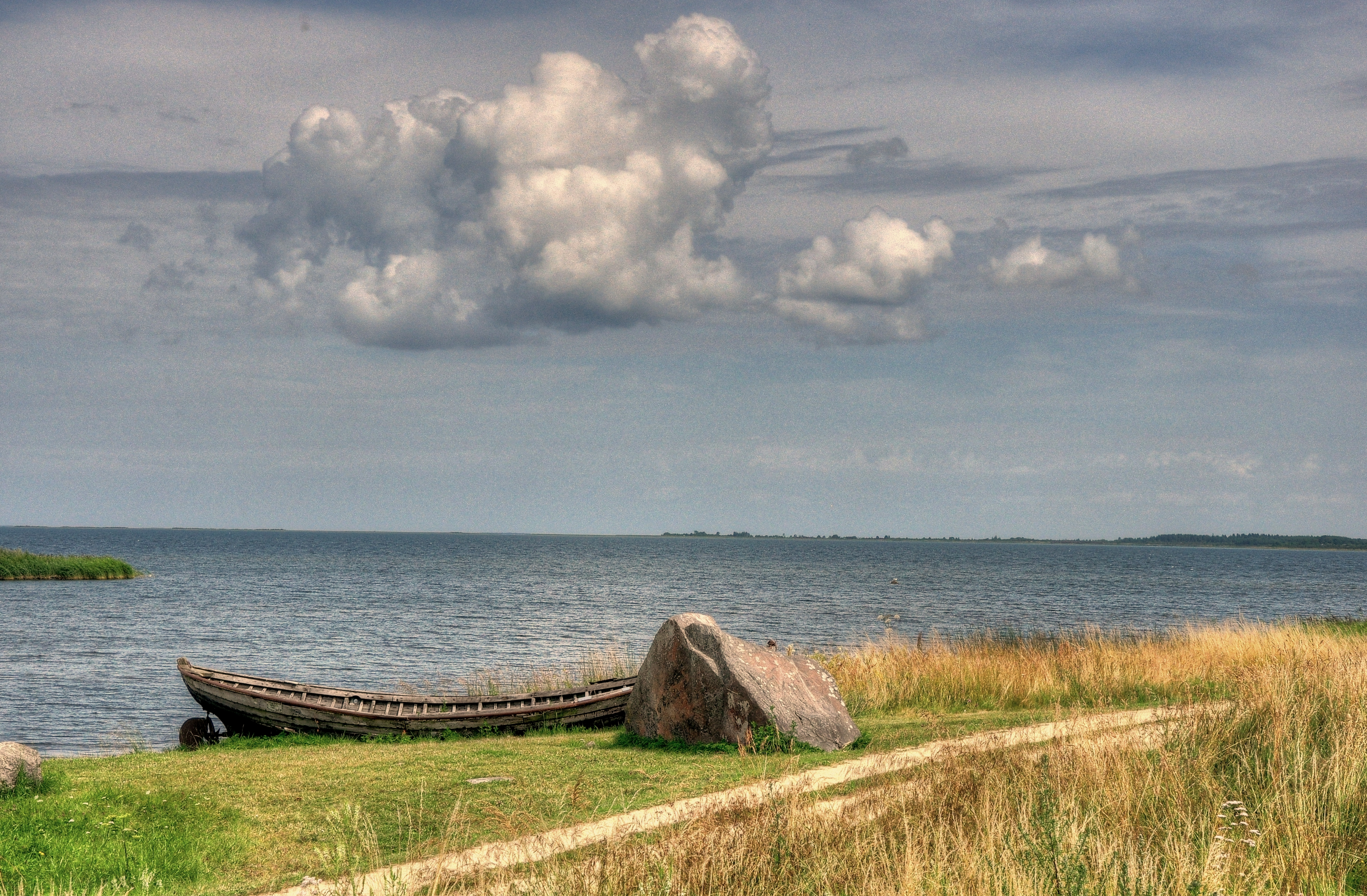
- Interactive map of Allikalahe
- Country: Estonia
- County: Saare County
- Parish: Saaremaa Parish
- Time zone: UTC+2 (EET)
  - Summer (DST): UTC+3 (EEST)

Allikalahe (Laheküla until 2017) is a village in Saaremaa Parish, Saare County in western Estonia.

Before the administrative reform in 2017, the village was in Laimjala Parish.

Children's writer, book illustrator, poet, and musician Henno Käo (1942–2004) was born in Allikalahe.
