= Linnusitamaa =

Island in Estonia

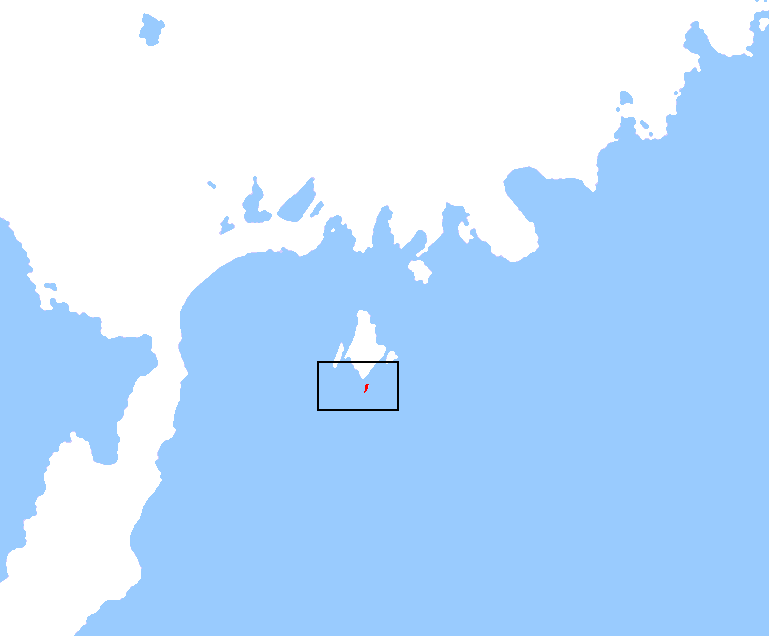
- Linnusitamaa in the northwestern part of Gulf of Riga

Geography
- Location: Gulf of Riga
- Coordinates: 58°07′07″N 22°30′37″E
- Area: 5.07 ha (12.5 acres)
- Coastline: 2.1 km (1.3 mi)

Administration
- Estonia
- County: Saare County
- Municipality: Saaremaa Parish
- Settlement: Abruka

Demographics
- Population: 0

Linnusitamaa (also known as Linnusita saar) is a 5.07 ha (12.5-acre) uninhabited Estonian islet in the Gulf of Riga. It is located about 300 m (980 ft) south of the island of Abruka. Administratively Linnusitamaa belongs to the village of Abruka in Saaremaa Parish, Saare County. The island is part of the Abruka Nature Reserve.

The name is a curiosity, literally meaning 'bird shit land' in Estonian. However, as the Estonian word does not have as offensive connotations as the English equivalent, it would more properly be translated as 'guano island'.

The New York Times reported that, during the 1905 Russian Revolution against Czarist Russia, Linnusitamaa, like other Baltic islands, declared itself an independent republic.

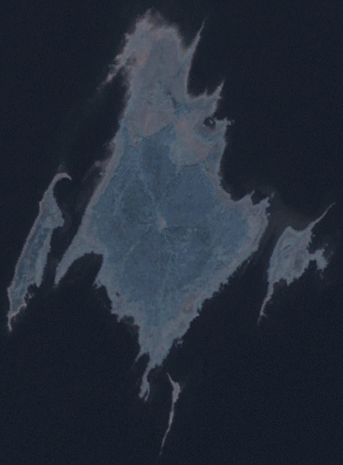
Linnusitamaa (bottom) on the satellite image with neighbouring islands

== See also ==
- List of islands of Estonia
