= Kustas Kikerpuu =

Estonian composer (1937–2008)

Kustas Kikerpuu (19 October 1937, Tallinn – 20 October 2008, Tallinn) was an Estonian composer, jazz musician and conductor.

== Life and career ==
In 1961, he graduated from Tallinn Music School (nowadays known as Georg Ots Tallinn Music College) in choral conducting.

In 1965–1976, he worked at Estonian Television as a conductor of ensemble and music editor. In 1976–1985, he was a music director for the advertisement office Eesti Reklaamfilm.

In 1983-2008, he was a member of Estonian Composers' Union.

== Awards ==
- 1983 - Estonian SSR annual prize for music
- 2006 - Annual Prize of the Endowment for Music of the Cultural Endowment of Estonia
- 2001 - Order of the White Star, IV class

== Songs and arrangements ==
- "Horoskoop"
- "Langevate lehtede aegu"
- "Meie kaks"
- "Suudluse ma saan"
- "Mul meeles veel"
- "Kannikesed emale"
- "Sulle kõik nüüd ütlen"
- "Väike neiu"
- "Lõppenud on päevad"
- "Korraks vaid"
- "Pilvevatimees"
- "See kaunis maa"
