= Laine (band) =

Estonian musical group

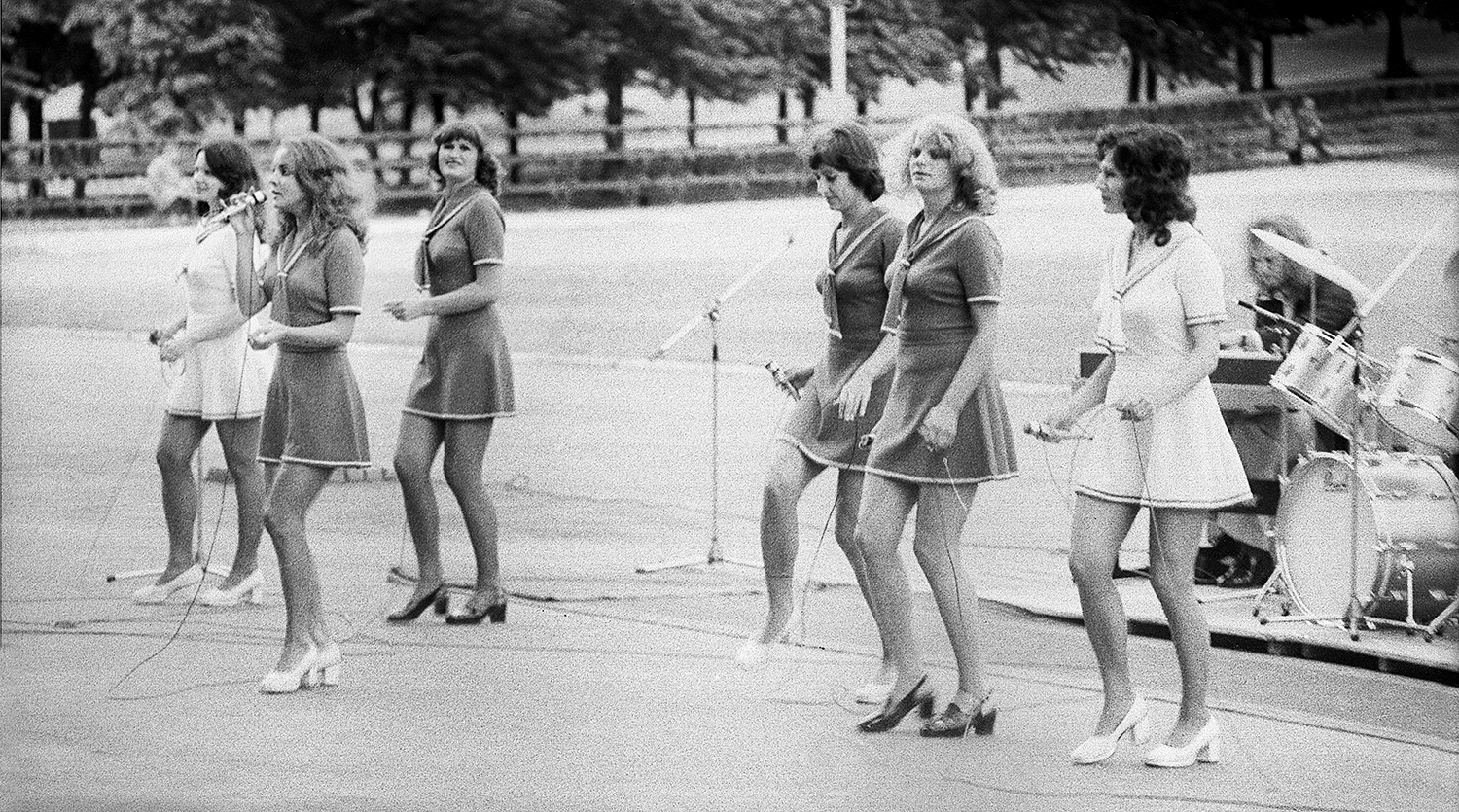
Laine in 1975

Laine is an Estonian band which was established in 1960 being a part of Estonian SSR State Philharmonic (nowadays Eesti Kontsert).

During Soviet era, the band was almost only one who introduced Estonian pop music to other Soviet republics and also outside Soviet Union.

== Members ==
During its long existence, many notable vocalists have sung in this band. Notable members:

- Vello Orumets
- Tarmo Pihlap
- Tõnis Mägi
- Heidy Tamme

Since 1970s, the band has had also special dancers group, supporting the vocalists.
