= Kukerpillid =

Estonian musical group

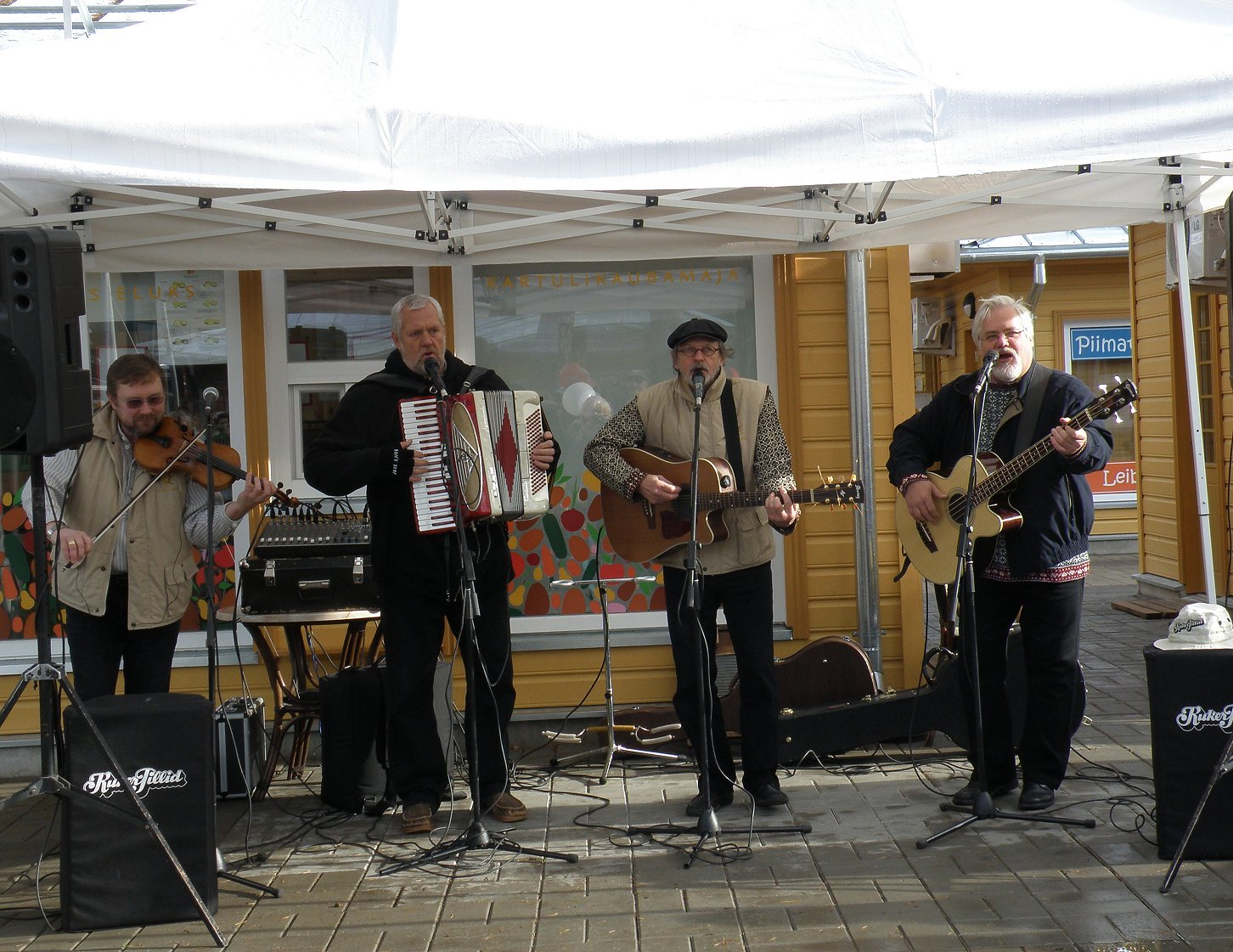

Background information
- Origin: Estonia
- Genres: folk music
- Years active: 1972‒present
- Members: Toomas Kõrvits – vocals, guitar, percussion; Ike Volkov – vocals, bass; Arne Haasma– vocals, accordion; Heiki Vahar – violin, mandolin
- Past members: Taivo Linna; Vello Salumets; Tiit Kõrvits; Tõnu Raadik; Kaarel Kilvet; Indrek Kalda; Jaan Arder; Vello Toomemets

Kukerpillid is an Estonian folk music ensemble established in 1972. It plays folk music of Estonia, as well as of other places of the world.

== Discography ==
- Rahvalikke laule, 1976 (EP)
- Kukerpillid Kanadas, 1976
- Ansambel "Kukerpillid" (1980), 1980
- 10 aastat Kukerpille, 1982
- Ansambel "Kukerpillid" (1987), 1987
- 15 aastat sõprade seltsis 1987
- Merel sündinud, 1988
- YLEN Kansanmusiikkia, 1990
- Simmaniduo & Kukerpillid 1992
- 20 aastat, 1992
- Kukerpillid, 1994
- Kui tore on see, 1996
- Veel kord CD1, CD2; 1997
- Tahan lennata, 1998
- Pojad on mul õige naksid CD1, CD2; 2002
- Eesti lastelaulud, 2003
- Šoti laulud Šoti klubis, 2003
- Meren juhlaa – Mere pidu, 2006
- Kukerpillid: 72 parimat laulu CD1, CD2, CD3; 2007
