= Afric Simone =

Mozambican musician (born 1939)

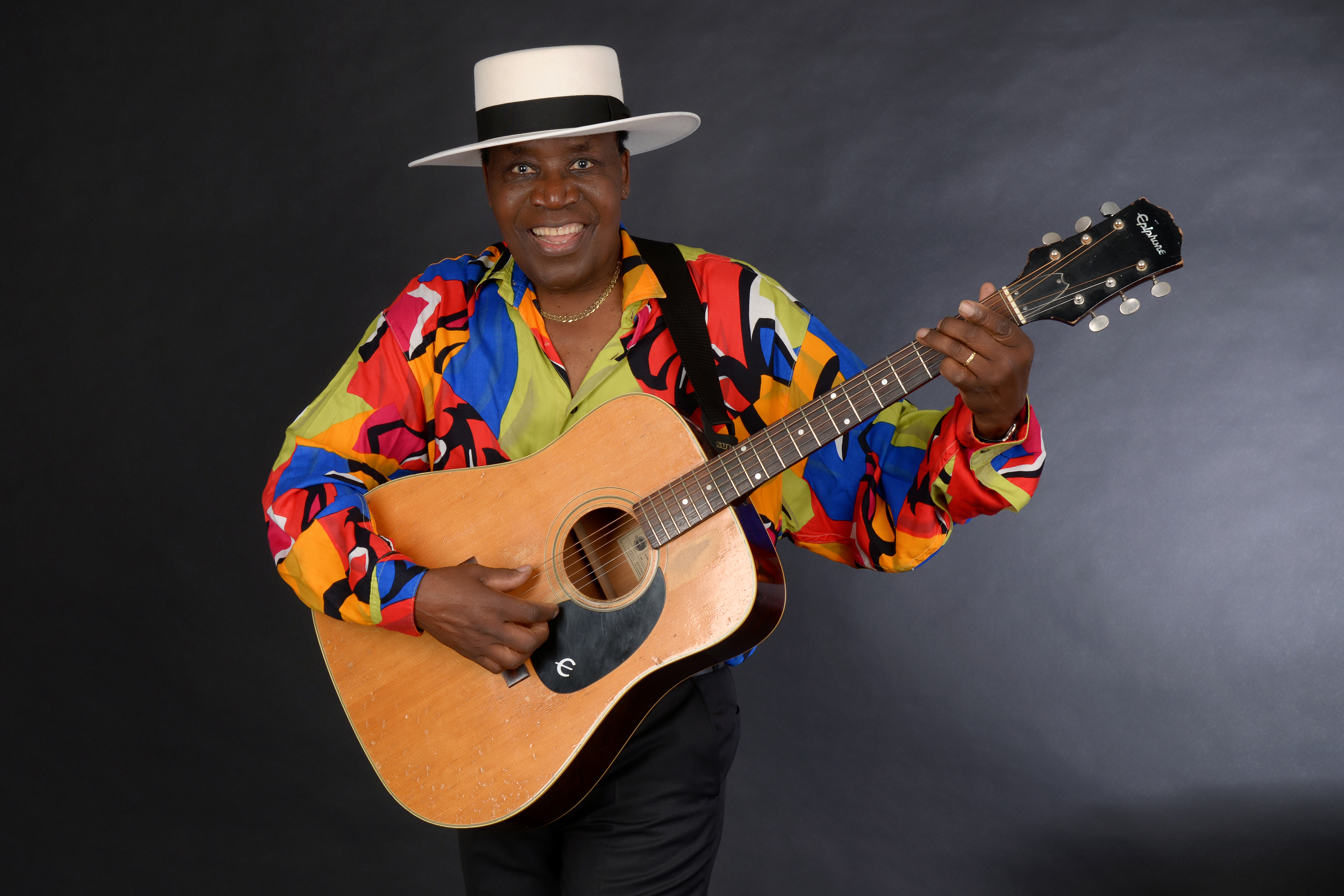
- Simone in 2016

Background information
- Also known as: Kid-kid; Monsieur Afrique; Simón el Africano
- Born: Henrique Joaquim Simone; 10 October 1939 (age 86); Inhambane, Portuguese Mozambique
- Occupations: Singer; musician; entertainer
- Years active: 1961–present
- Label: BASF
- Spouse: Ludmila
- Website: afric-simone.com

Henrique Joaquim Simone (born October 10, 1939), known professionally as Afric Simone, is a Mozambican vocalist, musician, performance artist, multi-instrumentalist, dancer, and entertainer. He entered the European charts with his first hit "Ramaya" in 1975, followed by another well-known song, "Hafanana", which was released later the same year.

Simone reached the peak of his popularity between 1975 and 1980 on both sides of the Iron Curtain, hence he toured the USSR, Poland, the GDR and Czechoslovakia in the Eastern Bloc, and retains that popularity even today throughout Europe.

Simone is one of the most prominent African musicians, being one of the few musicians of Mozambican ethnicity who sold-out shows at major international venues including L'Olympia, The Royal Albert Hall and the Carnegie Hall.

== Early life ==
Simone was born in Inhambane to a Brazilian father and Mozambican mother. Soon after his birth the family moved to Brazil, but at the age of 9 (after his father's death) Afric and his mother had to move to back to Mozambique.

Simone had to leave school and to start working, to help his mother and sisters. He was doing baby-sitting in the family of local doctor – and was constantly singing for the baby. At the age of 15 Simone and his friend moved to the capital of Mozambique, Maputo, and started their studies as masons / brick-layers. After completing his lessons Simone and his friend, to earn some money, performed at the city streets: played guitar, sang and danced. Since 1961 his artistic name was "Kid-kid" and many fans from Mozambique still remember the artist under that stage name.

A manager of one of Maputo’s hotels noticed two talented young provincials, and invited them to perform in the hotel restaurant. At that time Simone had three jobs simultaneously: on the weekend he played guitar and sang in the hotel, and during the working week he worked as a mason during the day and performed on the street in the evenings.

This lasted for a few years, and slowly Simone gained the local popularity; people started to recognize him on the street, and even the local newspaper wrote about him. Then the young musician was noticed by a professional music manager from South Africa.

== Professional career ==
Between 1965 and 1971, Simone released 5 singles under the artistic name Monsieur Afrique: Black Dynamite in 1965 on Ariola, El Matador (with Mosquito, Simone's first self-composed song, on side B) in 1969 on Teldec, Washboard man in 1970 on Polydor Records and Ich bin der grösste Lacher also in 1970 on Telefunken; and Feuer Feuer Feuer in 1971 at Hansa Records. Simone has been a member of GEMA (German organization) since 1970.

In 1972 the single Barracuda was released in South America under the artistic name Simón el Africano, and it brought Simone to #1 in the charts of many South American countries. After that Simone has started to spend more time performing in South America, especially in Brazil, than in Africa.

In 1973 Simone's manager suggested they should move to Europe. With first steps in show business in London, both the artist and manager have gathered new experiences and made connections in european show-business. In 1974, the single Barracuda was re-released in Europe - now under artistic name Afric Simone. Though the expected break-through did not happen, Simone continued doing gigs all over Europe.

In 1974 Eddie Barclay, French record producer and record label owner, went to see his show in Paris. They immediately signed a recording contract. In June 1975 the single Ramaya was released by Barclay (record label). The song became a summer hit, reaching Top 10 in many European countries and becoming #2 in Netherlands, #3 in Belgium and #5 in Sweden. In France the single Ramaya sold more than 300,000 copies, and Afric Simone was awarded the golden record, which he received on French television from Charles Aznavour.

Later in 1975, the single Hafanana (written by Simone together with Czech musician Stanislav Regal) was released.

Simone is also said to have pioneered the arts of breakdancing and beatboxing as can be seen in his live performances, such as the televised performance of his song Playa Blanca in 1976.

Afric Simone has been appearing in TV shows in France, Italy, Germany. In July 1977 Afric Simone performed Hafanana at the television show "Ein Kessel Buntes" in East Berlin. This TV-show was broadcast in all the countries of Eastern Europe, and made Afric Simone very popular on that side of the Iron Curtain.

In 1978 Simone's album was released in former Czechoslovakia, and as a result he was invited a few times to perform for Czech television in a program moderated by Karel Gott. There he surprised the spectators with fire tricks while performing Curare. In 1979 Simone has recorded a duo with Czech star Helena Vondráčková.

In February 1982 Simone performed in Budapest, Hungary, at the opening of a Budapest Sportcsarnok sports arena. In 1996 in Yakutsk, Russia Simone has been invited to visit the local shaman after the concert. That shaman made some ritual that would, presumably, help Afric to live healthy till the age of 100.

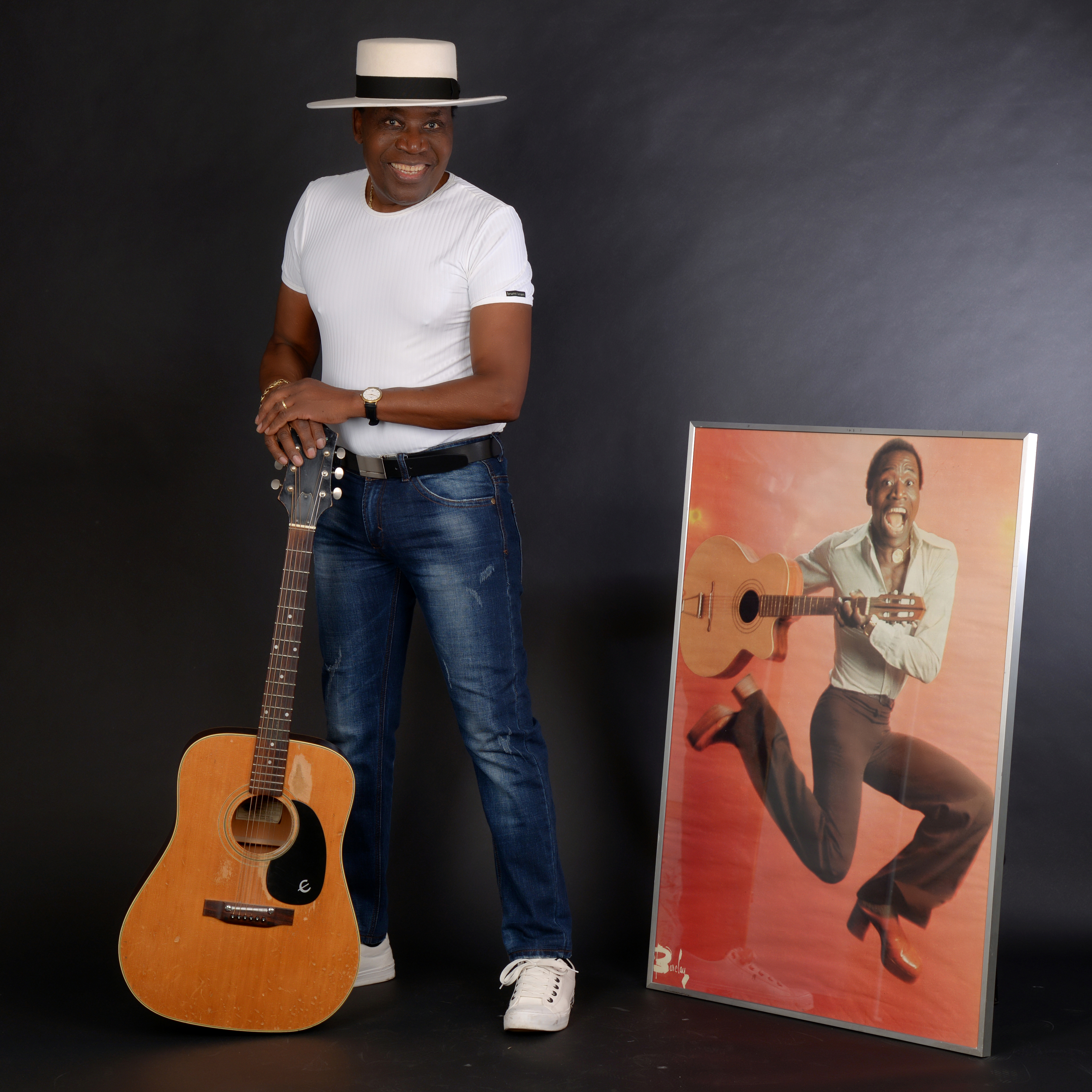
Afric Simone, 2016

In 1999 Afric Simone took part in the festival Tavria games in Ukraine. He still remembers the charter plane that the festival organizers hired to bring the artists from Kyiv to the festival ground near Kakhovka. Simone thought that "this aircraft was ready to fall apart in the air" – and refused to fly back, insisting on driving back to Kyiv (approx. 500 kilometers).

In 2003 Afric Simone took part in the second festival "Discoteka 80s", organized by the Moscow-based radiostation “AvtoRadio”. The festival took place at Luzhniki Palace of Sports, and has been broadcast by the first channel of Russian television on New Year's Eve.

In 2005 Afric Simone took part in a project "Melodies and rhythms from Europe in State Kremlin Palace». During this project Russian artists have performed the songs from international participants, and vice versa. Simone has performed – together with a Russian singer Evgeny Osin – the song called “Our neighbor", originally recorded by a polish singer Edita Piekha in 1968.

In 2012 Afric Simone has taken part in the festival "Legends of Retro FM", that took place in Olympic Stadium (Moscow) (maximum capacity 35.000 spectators).

The collaboration with the "Retro FM" radiostation has continued: in October 2014 Afric Simone has celebrated his 75th birthday on board of cruise ship Liberty of the Seas, during a "Retro FM" cruise – together with Joy and María Mendiola's Baccara.

In October 2017 Afric Simone - together with Joy and María Mendiola's Baccara - performed in Mogilev, in Belarus, at the festival "Golden Schlager". Next to the cultural palace of Mogilev he has planted a maple, that became part of the “Alley of stars”.

In March 2018 Simone has for the first time performed in Chișinău, in Moldova, at the festival "Retro Legends" (part of the 10-days Mărțișor festival) - together with such artists as Ottawan and Ricchi e Poveri.

In February 2019 Afric Simone has performed – along with many European and Russian artists from 80s and 90s – at "Discoteka Avtoradio" festivals, that took place in Berlin (Velodrom) and Düsseldorf (ISS Dome).

In 2020 Afric Simone received a badge of honour from German Author's Rights Society GEMA (German organization), marking his 50-years long active membership.

In July 2022 Afric Simone performed at the festival in Cluj-Napoca, in Romania. In October 2023 Afric Simone has performed at the festival "Arena Retro Party" in Budapest, Hungary, and on 31 December 2023 – in Tbilisi, in Georgia (country).

== Cover-versions ==
Afric Simone’s songs have been covered in many languages, in many different countries.

In Netherlands, the following cover-versions of Simone's hit Ramaya have been released: Rammen maar by André van Duin in Dutch, De soup is burnt by Anja Yelles in Dutch, in 1994; Just a cheerful song by DJ Dennis in English, in 1996. In Germany, “Saragossa band” released a song Moonlight and dancing in English, in 1984 (originally Playa Blanca by Simone). In Estonia, the band “Apelsin” released the song Himaalaja in Estonian language in 1979 (originally Ramaya by Simone).

In Czech Republic, the singer Daniel Nekonečný released Simone's Hafanana under the title Sexy Hafanana. In Finland, the singer Frederik has covered two hits of Simone - Ramaya in 1976 and “Hafanana” in 1989. Later another finnish singer, Tapani Kansa, also released his cover-version of Hafanana.

In Japan, Hiro Nagasawa's band "Hero" covered Afric Simone’s song China girl. That version was used as the title song for the Japanese release of the movie Fistful Spirit, starring Jackie Chan. In Slovakia, the band “Maduar” released their cover-versions of Hafanana in 1996 and of Ramaya in 1997.

== Private life ==
Afric Simone speaks German, English, Portuguese, French, Spanish, and various African languages; however his songs are written in the mixture of Swahili and few words from other languages.

His cousin is the Mozambique-born Portuguese football player Eusébio.

In 1978, Simone settled in Berlin, Germany. Afric Simone has been married three times. From his second marriage he has a son, Fabio. Simone's third wife, Ludmila, is Russian. They met in Berlin in 2003.

In 2021, Simone took part in a vaccination promotion campaign, organized by the Slovak Ministry of Interior.

== Discography ==
=== Albums ===
- 1974 – Mr. Barracuda (BASF, 2021932)
- 1975 – Ramaya (Barclay, 70024)
- 1976 – Aloha Playa Blanca (CNR)
- 1978 – Boogie Baby (RCA)
- 1978 – Jambo Jambo (Epic)
- 1981 – Marria Sexy Bomba De Paris (Epic)
- 1990 – Afro Lambada (Multisonic)

=== CD ===
- 1989 – Best of Afric Simone (re-edition 2002 with bonus tracks)

=== Singles ===
- 1965 - "Black Dynamit" / "Monsieur Afriquc" (Ariola)
- 1969 - "El Matador" / "Mosquito" (Teldec)
- 1970 - "Washboard Man" / "Harana" (Polydor)
- 1970 - "Ich bin der grösste Lacher" / "Mr. Watussi" (Telefunken)
- 1971 - "Feuer Feuer Feuer" / "Salt-Lake-City Train" (Hansa)
- 1972 – "Barracuda" / "Hey Safari" (BASF)
- 1974 – "Barracuda" / "Hûmbala" (Ariola 1974)
- 1975 – "Ramaya" / "Piranha" (Barclay, BRCNP 40066)
- 1976 – "Hafanana" / "Sahara" (Barclay, BRCNP 40072)
- 1976 – "Aloha-Wamayeh" / "Al Capone" (Hansa, 17 586 AT)
- 1977 – "Maria Madalena" / "Aloha" (Barclay)
- 1977 – "Playa Blanca" / "Que Pasa Mombasa" (Musart, MI 30387)
- 1978 – "Playa Blanca" / Marabu (Barclay)
- 1980 – "China Girl" / "Salomé" (Barclay)
