= Heidy Tamme =

Estonian singer

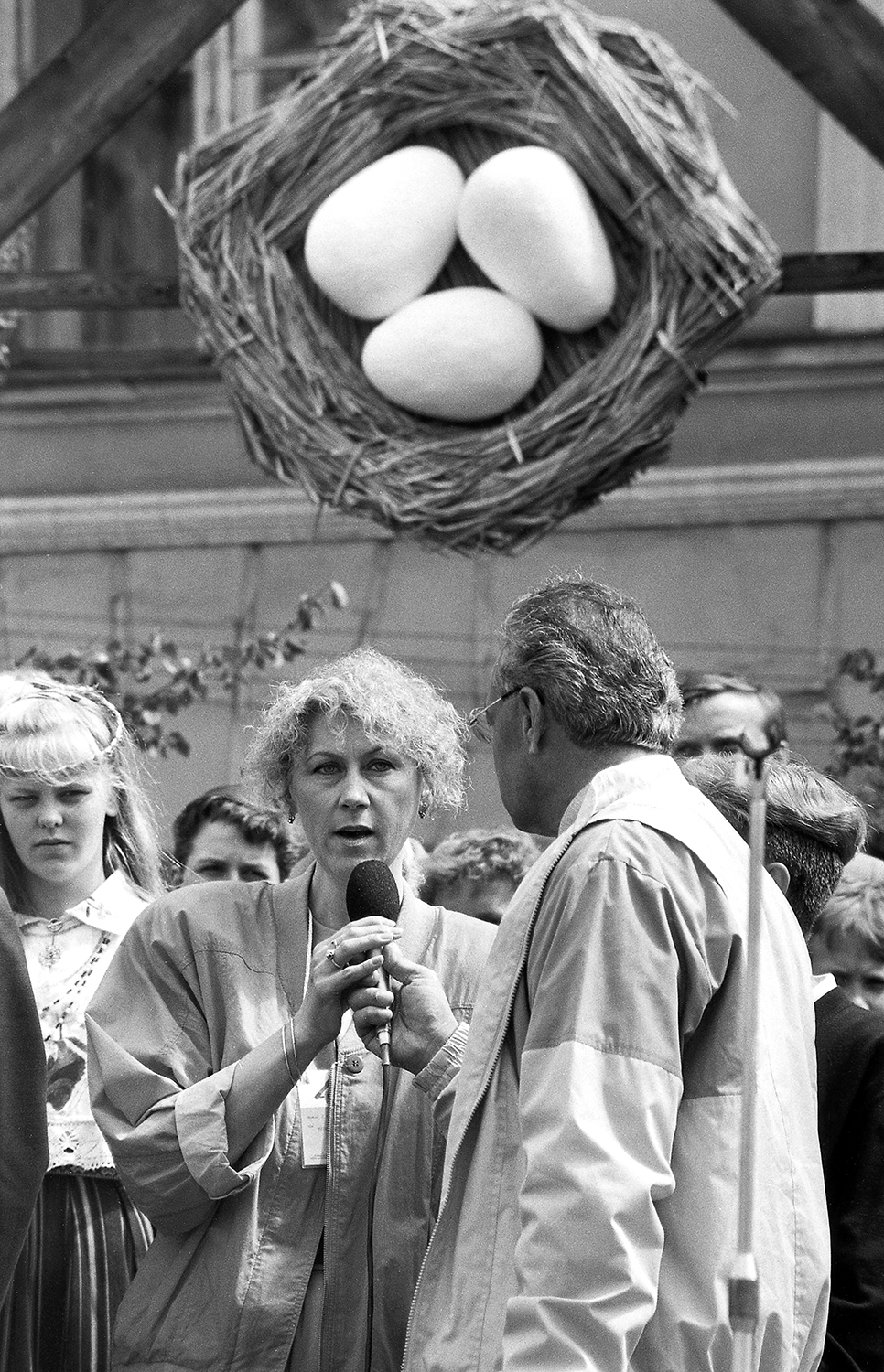
Heidy Tamme in 1989.

Heidy Tamme (also known as Heidi Tamme, née Heidy Laanemäe; born on 5 April 1943) is an Estonian estrada, chamber and pop singer whose career began in the early 1960s.

Tamme was born in Ulyanovsk, Russia to Estonian parents. The family returned to Estonia when she was young. She attended primary and secondary schools in Tallinn. In 1964, she graduated from the Tallinn Music School with a degree in choir and orchestra conducting and from the Tallinn Conservatory in 1966, studying music under tutelage of Uno Naissoo.

From 1967 to 1983, she was a soloist for the Estonian Philharmonic. From 1967 to 1969, she was a singer with the ensemble Laine.

== Selected filmography ==
- 1969 Uksed (acted as presenter)
- 1970 Ahvatluste tund (acted as singer)
- 1974 Sillerdav päev (acted as presenter)
- 1981 Nukitsamees
