= Abruka =

Island village in Estonia

- village
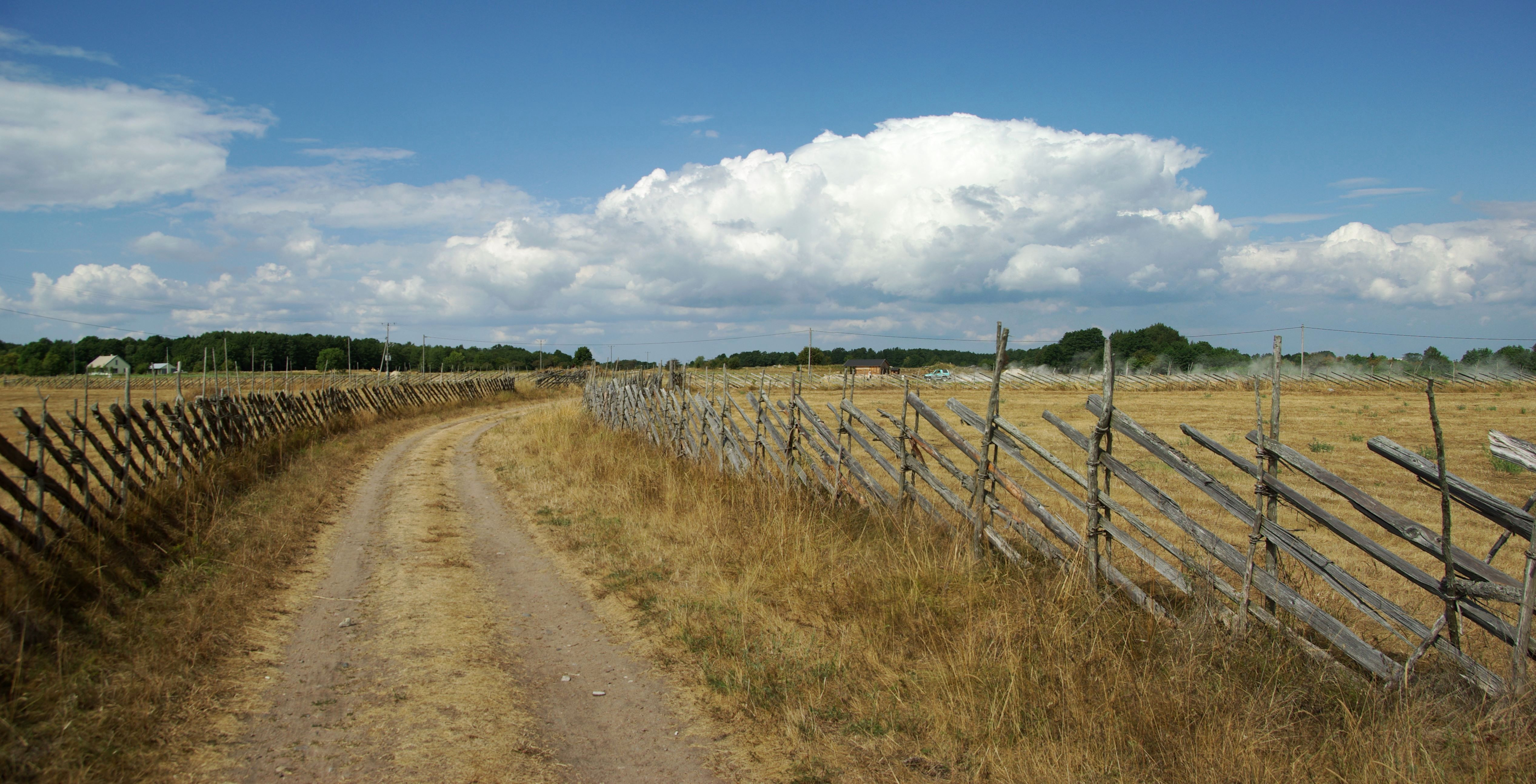
- Village road on Abruka island

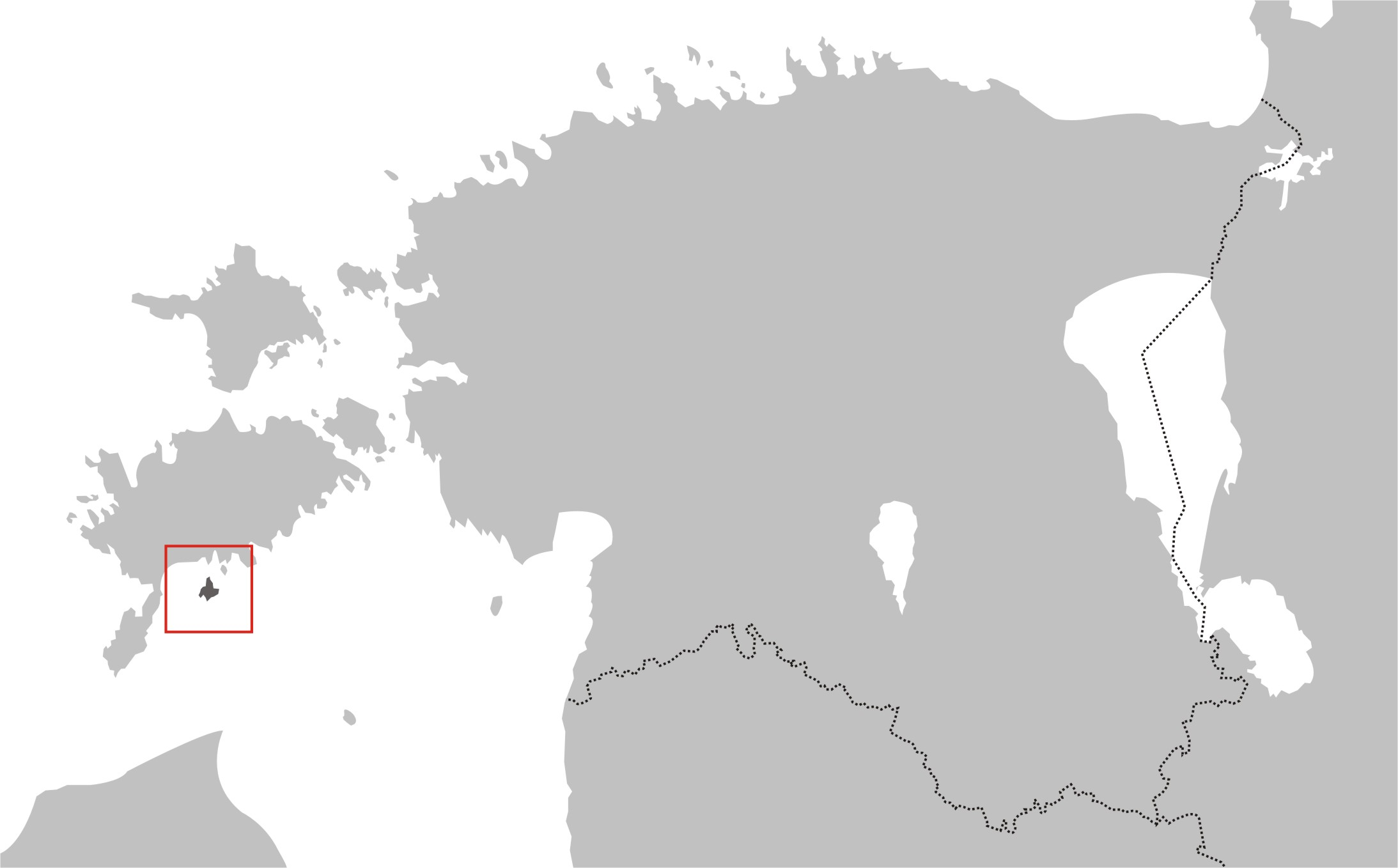
- Location of Abruka in Estonia.
- Coordinates: 58°09′50″N 22°30′14″E
- Country: Estonia
- County: Saare County
- Municipality: Saaremaa Parish

Area^{(Area of village)}
  - Total: 10.1 km^{2} (3.9 sq mi)

Population (01.01.2011)
  - Total: 33
  - Density: 3.3/km^{2} (8.5/sq mi)

Abruka (Low German: Abro) is a village in Estonia, primarily composed of the 8.78 km^{2} (3.39 sq mi) island of Abruka in the Gulf of Riga, 4 km south of the island of Saaremaa. The village includes the smaller adjacent islands of Vahase, Kasselaid, Linnusitamaa and Kirjurahu, resulting in a total area of 10.1 km^{2} (3.9 sq mi).

Abruka is part of Kaarma district (osavald) of Saaremaa Parish, Saare County. The village has a population of 33 (as of 1 January 2011).

The first records about the population on Abruka originate from the Middle Ages, when the area was ruled by the Prussian State of the Teutonic Order; the Bishop of Ösel-Wiek founded a horse breeding manor on the largest island, named Abro in the Teutonic Order's Low German language. Permanent population developed in the 18th century. From 1881–1972, an elementary school operated on Abruka.

Abruka is the site of a Central European-type broadleaf forest, which is rare in the region. To protect this a nature reserve was created in 1937.

There is a library (located in the harbour building) and a museum which is located on the side of the former manor park in the oldest building on Abruka (the Abruka House of the Abruka Manor).

Abruka can be reached by postboat Heili from Roomassaare harbour in Kuressaare.

The twin writers Jüri Tuulik and Ülo Tuulik (born 1940) were born on Abruka.

== Gallery ==
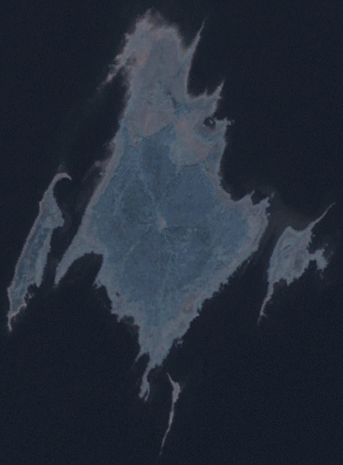
Satellite image of Abruka.

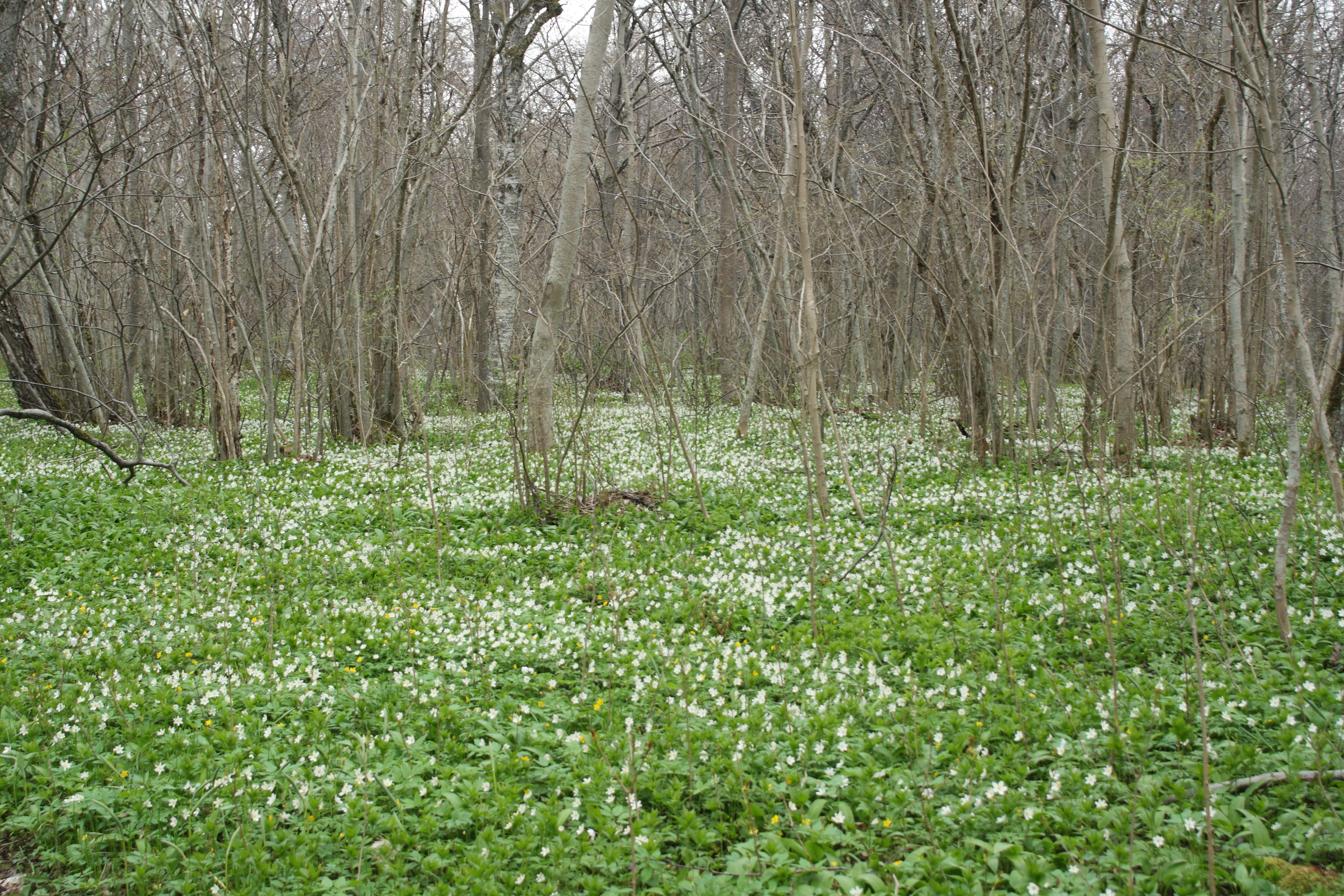
Grove forest in spring.

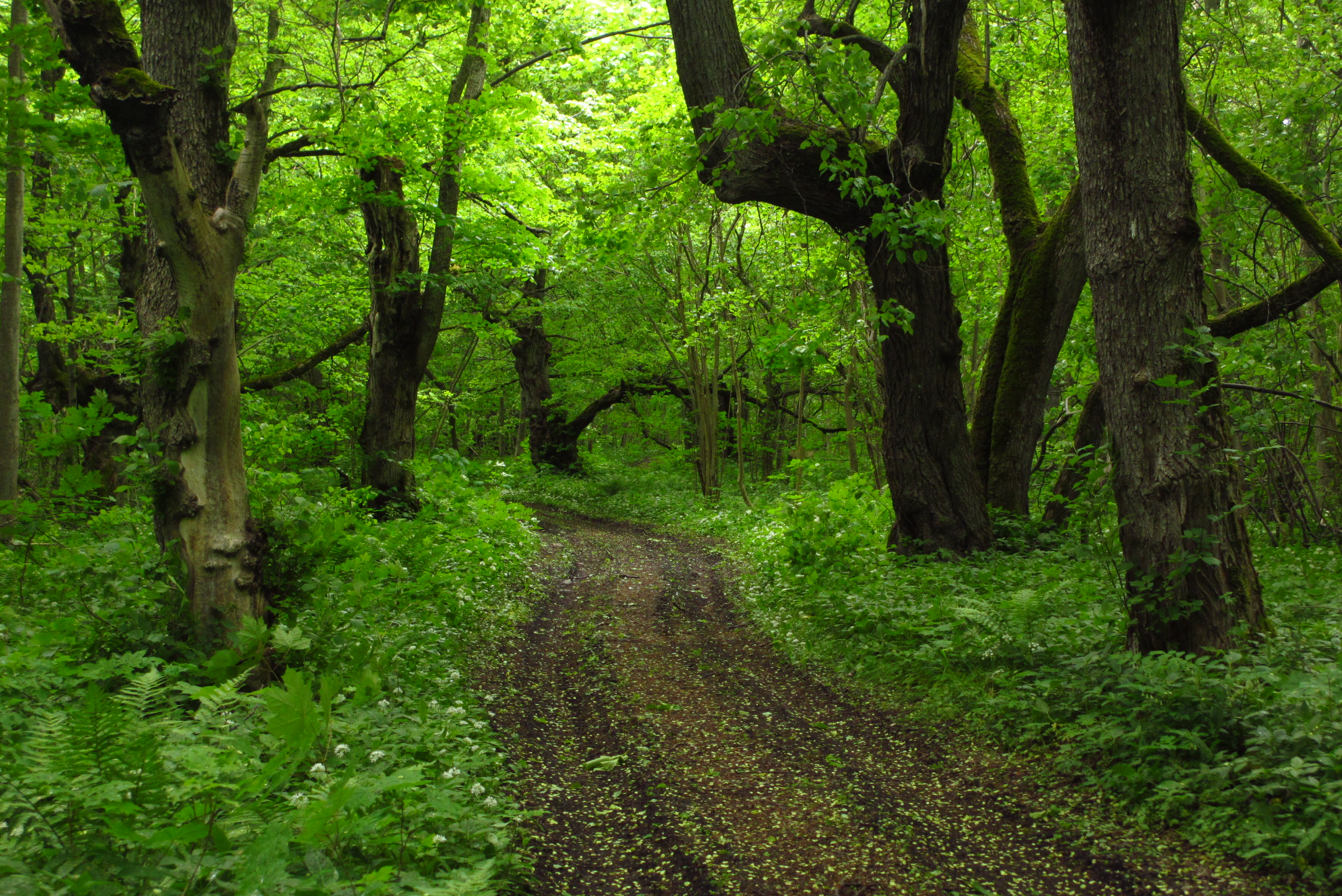
Grove forest in June.

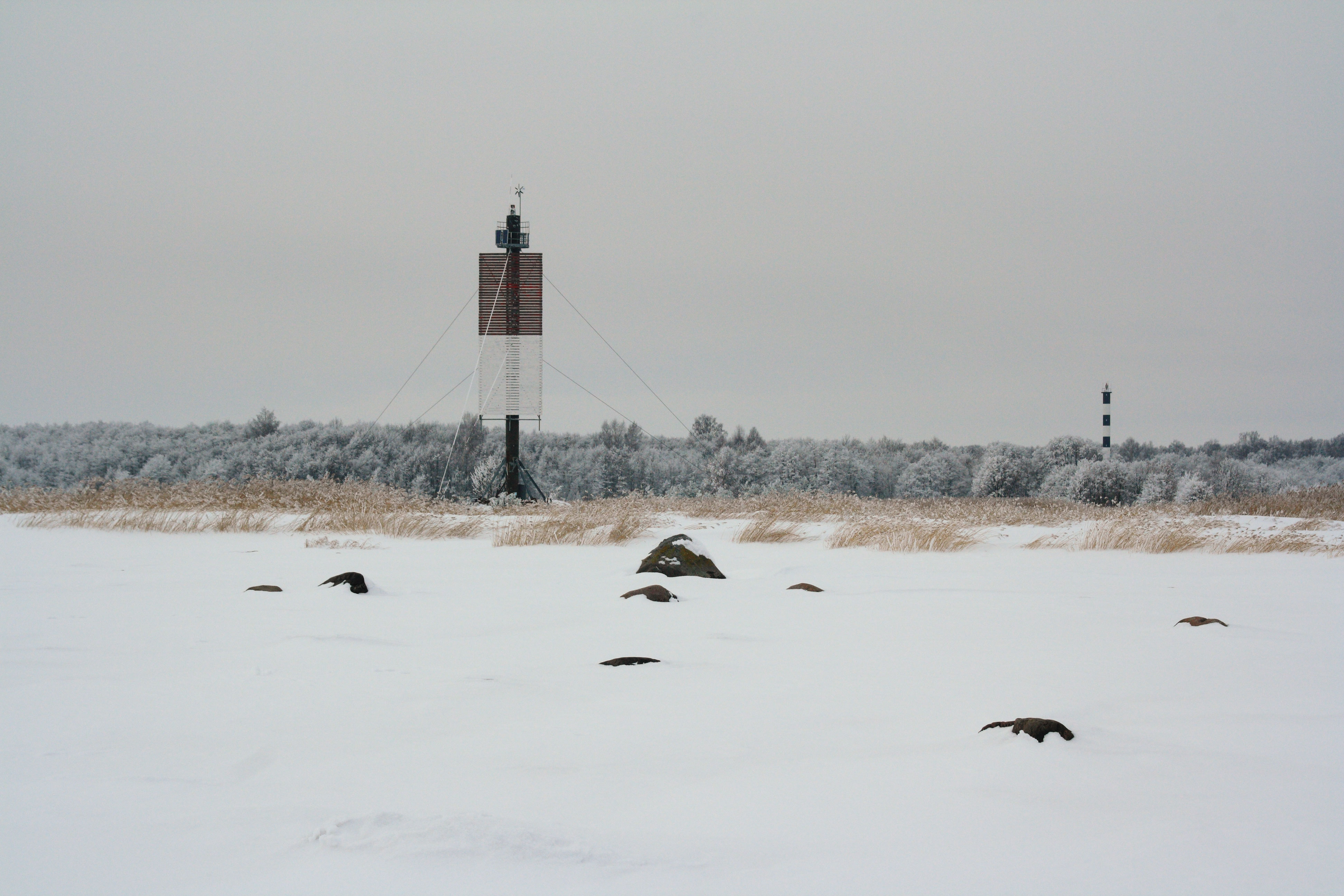
Lighthouses of Abruka.

== See also ==
- Abruka Nature Reserve
- Kasselaid
