= Abruka Nature Reserve =

Protected area in Estonia

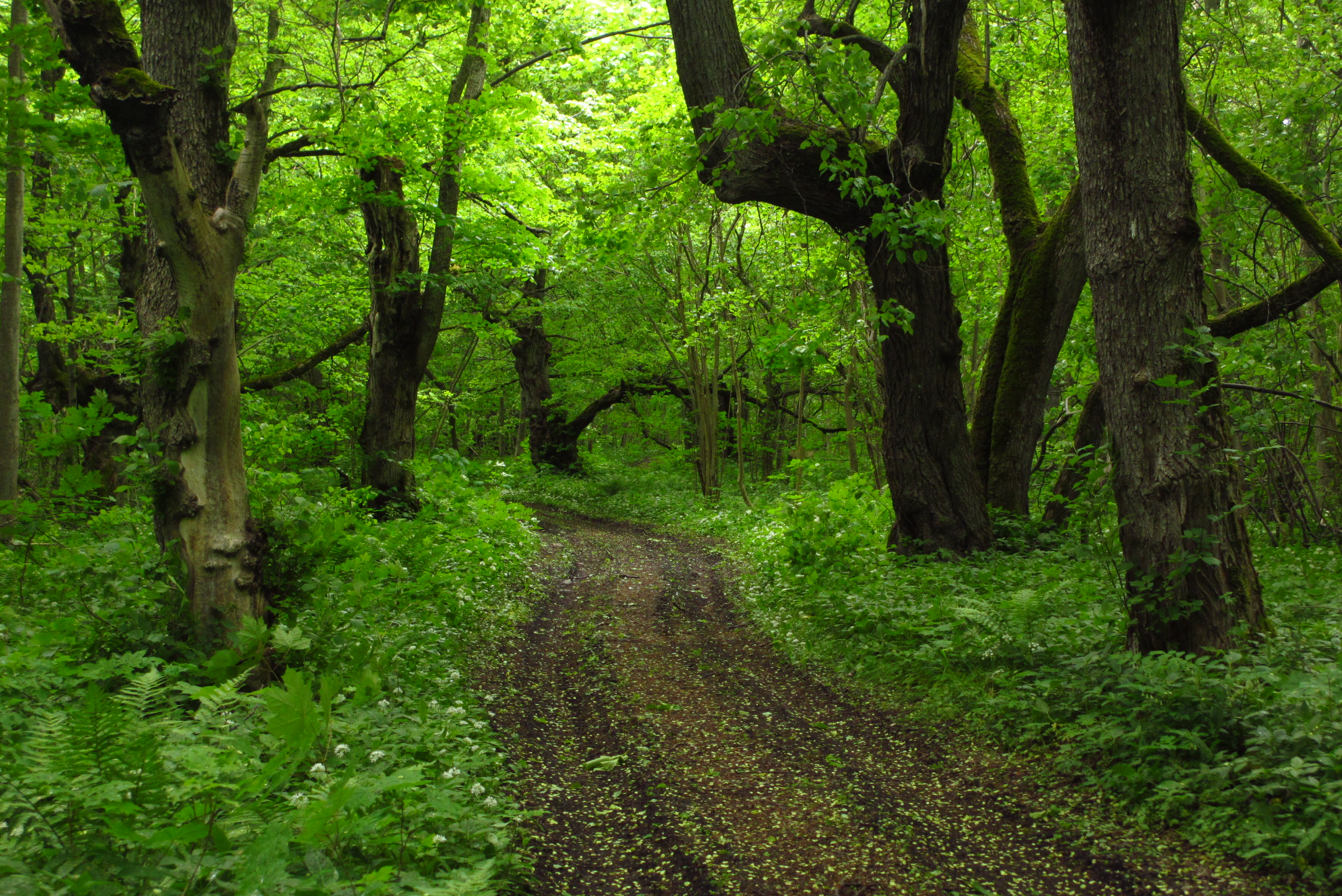
- Interactive map of Abruka Nature Reserve
- Location: Estonia
- Coordinates: 58.1464°N 22.5072°E
- Area: 414 ha (1,020 acres)
- Established: 1937 (2007)

Abruka Nature Reserve is a nature reserve which is located in Saare County, Estonia. It covers the islands of Abruka, Kasselaid and Linnusitamaa.

The area of the nature reserve is 414 ha.

The protected area was founded in 1937 to protect forests in Abruka. In 2007 the protected area was designated to the nature reserve.
