= Kasselaid =

Island in Estonia

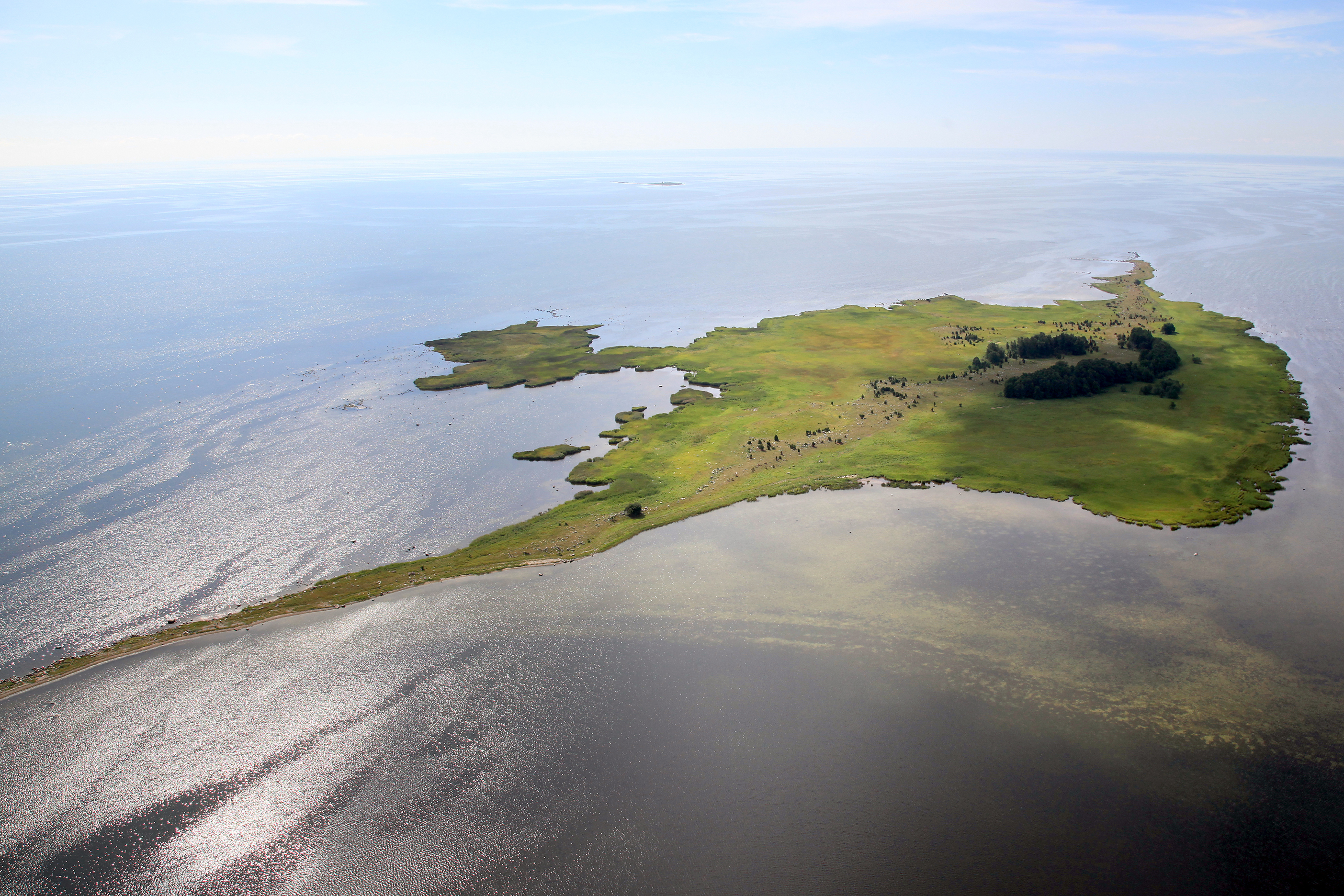
- Interactive map of Kasselaid

Geography
- Location: Gulf of Riga
- Coordinates: 58°8′33″N 22°32′33″E
- Area: 49.92 ha (123.4 acres)
- Coastline: 7.4 km (4.6 mi)

Administration
- Estonia
- County: Saare County
- Municipality: Saaremaa Parish
- Settlement: Abruka village

Demographics
- Population: 0

Kasselaid is a 49.92 ha (123.4 acres) uninhabited Estonian islet in the Gulf of Riga, about 300 m (980 ft) east of the island of Abruka. Administratively, it belongs to the Abruka village in Saaremaa Parish, Saare County. The island is part of the Abruka Nature Reserve.

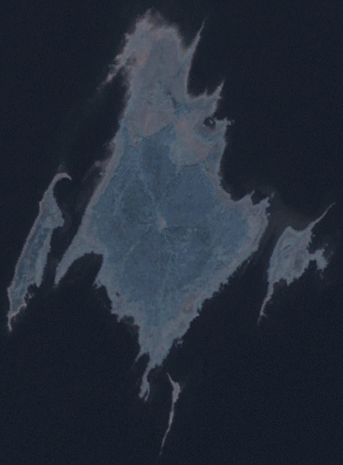
Kasselaid (right) on the satellite image with neighbouring islands

== See also ==
- List of islands of Estonia
