= Tõnu Raadik =

Estonian actor, composer, and violinist (born 1957)

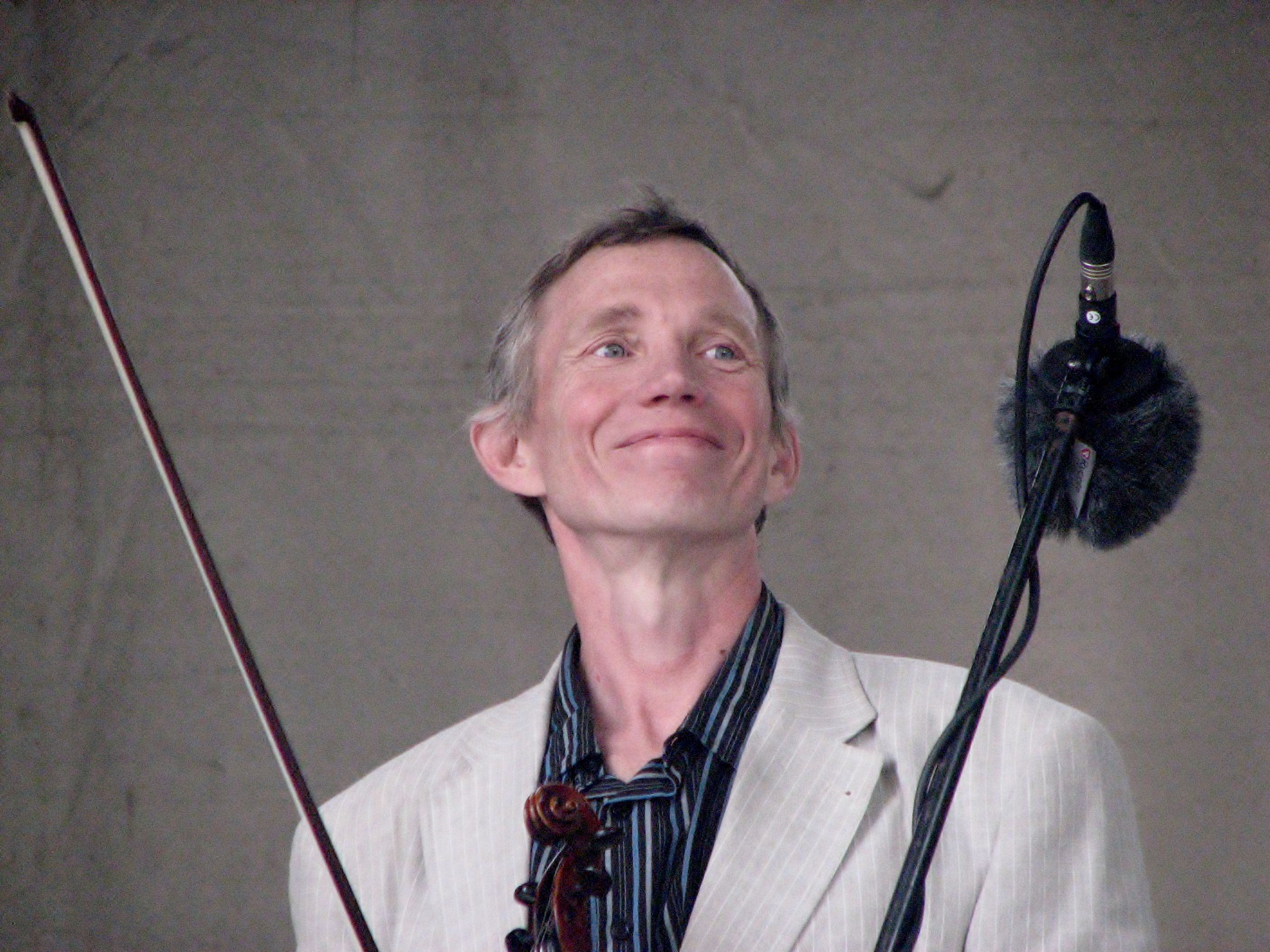
- Raadik in 2013
- Born: 15 December 1957 (age 68); Jõhvi, then part of Estonian SSR, Soviet Union
- Education: Tallinn State Conservatory
- Occupations: Actor; composer; violinist
- Years active: 1980–present

Tõnu Raadik (born 15 December 1957) is an Estonian actor, composer and violinist.

== Early life and education ==
Raadik was born 15 December 1957 in Jõhvi.

In 1980 he graduated from Tallinn State Conservatory's Performing Arts Department, and in 1992 the same institution in composition speciality.

== Career ==
From 1980 until 1986, he played at Estonian Puppet Theatre, and from 1986 until 1992, at the Estonian Youth Theatre. Since 1993 he is a freelancer. Besides theatre roles he has played also in several films.

He has written chamber, theatre, and film music. He has been a member of music groups, e.g. in Kukerpillid (1976–1986 and 1997–1998).

== Filmography ==
- 1983: Suletud ring (feature film; role: Roland Ern)
- 1989: Inimene, keda polnud (feature film; composer and in role: Hans Brandt)
- 1994: Ameerika mäed (feature film; composer)
- 2021: Kaka ja kevad (animated film; composer)
