= Jüri Tuulik =

Estonian writer and playwright

Jüri Tuulik (22 February 1940 Abruka island, Saare County – 3 June 2014 Kuressaare) was an Estonian writer and playwright.

In 1963, he graduated from Tartu State University in Estonian philology. After graduating, he worked at the newspapers Edasi, Noorte Hääl and the journal Vesikaar. Since 1969, he was a professional writer.

His twin brother was the writer Ülo Tuulik and his cousin was writer Juhan Smuul. Since 1972, he was a member of Estonian Writers' Union.

== Awards ==
- 1977: Eduard Vilde Literature Prize
- 1979: Juhan Smuul Literature Annual Award
- 1981: Juhan Smuul Annual Literature Prize
- 1986: Meritorious Writer of the Estonian SSR
- 1998: August Mälk Short Story Award
- 1999: August Mälk Short Story Award
- 2000: August Mälk short story award
- 2005: Oskar Luts Humor Award
- 2005: Hendrik Krumm Cultural Scholarship
- 2009: Friedebert Tuglas Short Story Award

== Works ==
- 1966: short prose "Tund enne väljasõitu: jutte ja laaste 1962-1964". Tallinn: Eesti Raamat, 104 pp.
- 1972: short prose "Vana loss: Abruka lood". Tallinn: Eesti Raamat, 192 pp.
- 1979: novel "Vares". Tallinn: Perioodika (Loomingu Raamatukogu)
