= Ramaya =

1975 song by Afric Simone

- Cover for the Italian release

Single by Afric Simone

from the album Ramaya
- B-side: "Piranha"
- Released: 1975
- Length: 3:10
- Label: Barclay Records
- Songwriters: Afric Simone; Stan Regal
- Producer: Jörg Schmeier

Afric Simone singles chronology
"Ramaya" (1975)	"Hafanana" (1975)

"Ramaya" is a song by Mozambican recording artist Afric Simone in 1975, sung in a mix of African languages – the words have no coherent meaning, and contrary to common belief they are not in Swahili.

== Weekly charts ==
Chart (1975–1976)	Peak position
Belgium (Ultratop 50 Flanders)	3
Italy (FIMI)	1
Netherlands (Dutch Top 40)	2
Netherlands (Single Top 100)	2
Sweden (Sverigetopplistan)	5

Chart (1999)	Peak position
France (SNEP)	59

== Year-end charts ==
Chart (1975)	Position
Belgium (Ultratop 50 Flanders)	35
France (IFOP)	16
Netherlands (Dutch Top 40)	22
Netherlands (Single Top 100)	8

Chart (1976)	Position
Italy (FIMI)	5

== See also ==
- List of number-one hits of 1976 (Italy)
