= Tarmo Pihlap =

Estonian singer and guitarist

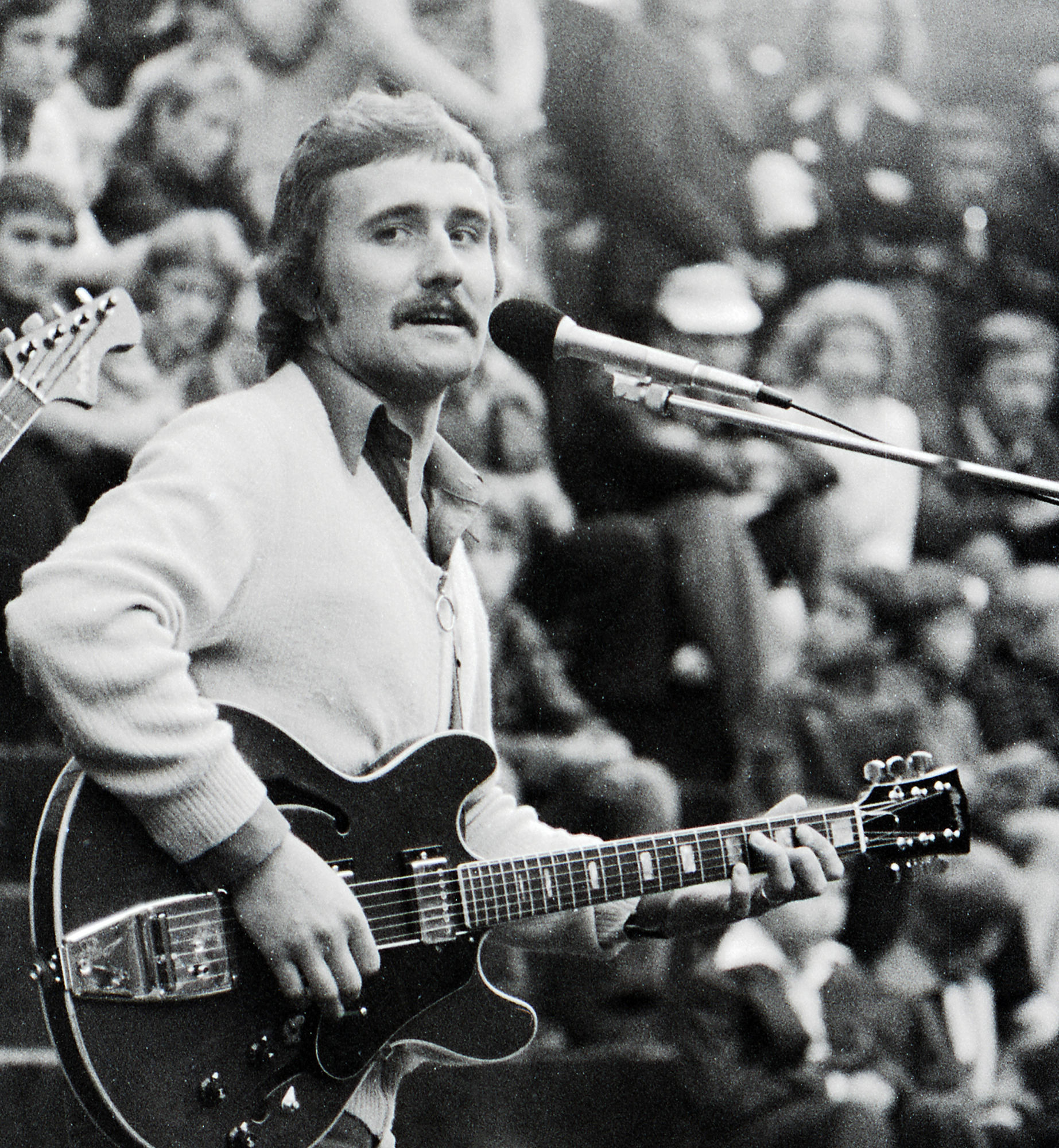
- Tarmo Pihlap in 1978

Background information
- Born: 21 April 1952; Abja-Paluoja, then part of Estonian SSR, Soviet Union
- Died: 3 August 1999 (aged 47) Tallinn, Estonia
- Genres: Pop, rock, schlager
- Occupations: Singer, guitarist
- Years active: 1965–1999

Tarmo Pihlap (21 April 1952 – 3 August 1999) was an Estonian singer and guitarist.

Pihlap studied violin at the Heino Eller Music School. From 1970 until 1972, he studied percussion at the Tallinn Music School. In 1986 he graduated from Georg Ots Tallinn Music College with a degree in singing.

He was a member of several musical groups, e.g. 1965–1970 in the bands Varjud, Fix, Meloodika, and Hanuri; 1970–1971 in the band Baltika. 1971–1980 he was a soloist at Estonian State Philharmonic (including 1971–1974 in Laine and 1975–1980 in Palderjan). Since 1980 he was a freelance singer.

Pihlap died in 1999 from diabetic ketoacidosis, aged 47.

== Albums ==
- 1981 "Tarmo Pihlap (1981)" (Meloodia, 7" LP)
- 1985 "Tarmo Pihlap (1985)" (Meloodia, 7" LP)
- 1993 "Tarmo Pihlap (1993)" (Arlim, MC)
- 1994 "Sillad" (Valindo, CD, MC)
- 1995 "Valged roosid" (Valindo, MC)
- 1997 "Aeg kaob, rõõmud jäävad" Kutse tantsule nr.5 (Aidem Pot, CD, MC)
- 1998 "Jõhvikad" (Hitivabrik, CD, MC)
- 1999 "Valged roosid" (Hitivabrik, CD)
- 2000 "Tarmo Pihlap - 70 parimat laulu" Eesti kullafond (Hitivabrik, 3CD, 2MC)
- 2001 "Parimad" (Records 2000, CD)
- 2008 "Classics" (Records 2000, CD)
