= Mati Nuude =

Estonian weightlifter and singer (1941-2001)

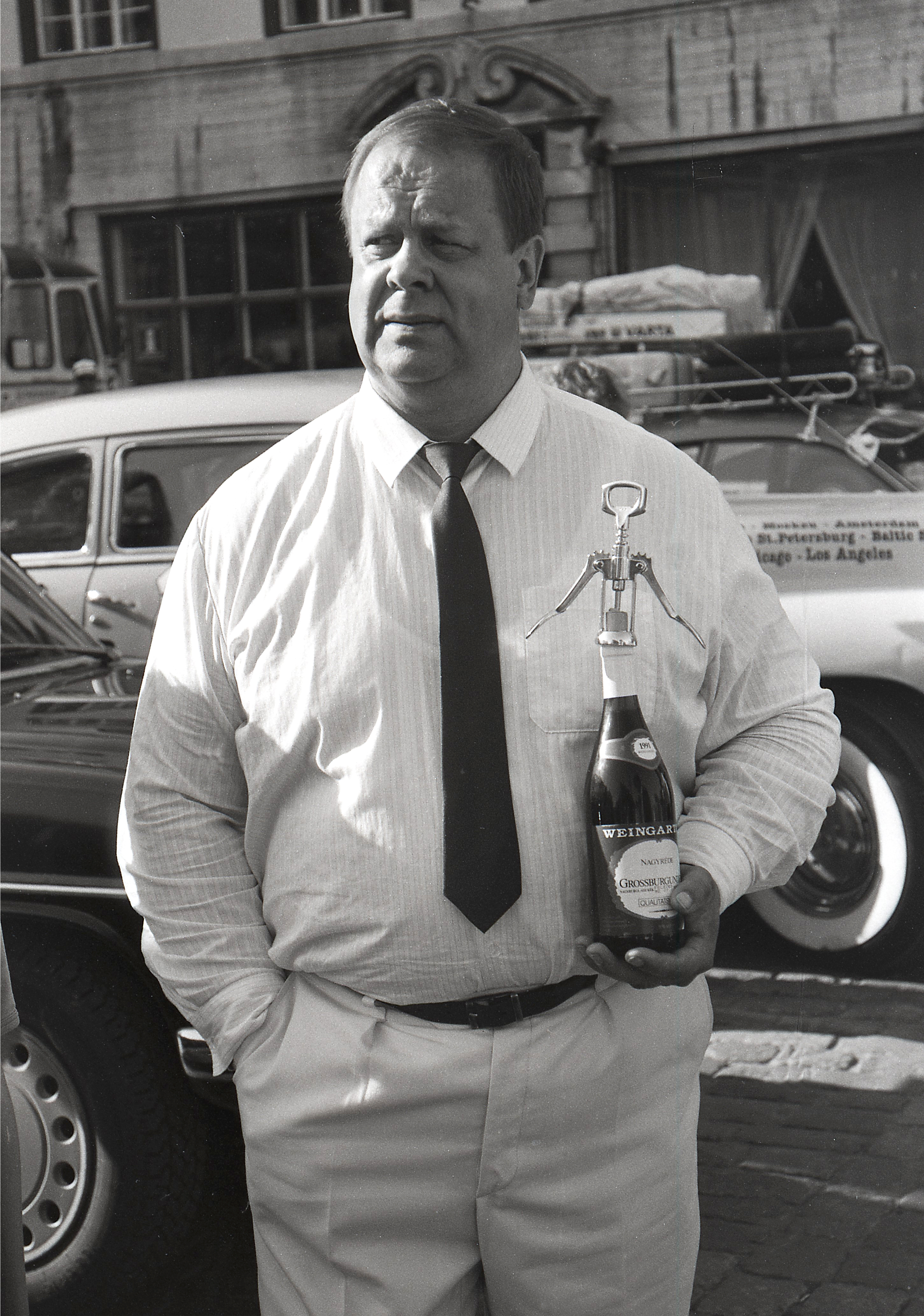
- Nuude in 1992
- Born: 18 February 1941; Tallinn
- Died: 10 March 2001 (aged 60); Tallinn
- Occupations: weightlifter and singer
- Parent: Lieutenant Albert Nuude

Mati Nuude (18 February 1941 – 10 March 2001) was an Estonian weightlifter and singer.

Nuude was born in Tallinn to a family of an Estonian officer, Lieutenant Albert Nuude, who was arrested by the NKVD and died in a Soviet prison camp. In 1949, Nuude, his mother, grandmother and brother were deported to Northern Kazakhstan. They were allowed to return to Estonia in 1958. His uncle was actor Rudolf Nuude.

His coach in weightlifting was Alfred Neuland. During 1965–1975, he was 7 times champion of Estonia in weightlifting, and at his peak, he was the eighth strongest man in the world.

During 1975–1989, he was a singer in the band Apelsin. Later, he was a solo singer.

Mati Nuude died in Tallinn and is interred in the Metsakalmistu cemetery, Tallinn.
