= Ülo Tuulik =

Estonian writer (born 1940)

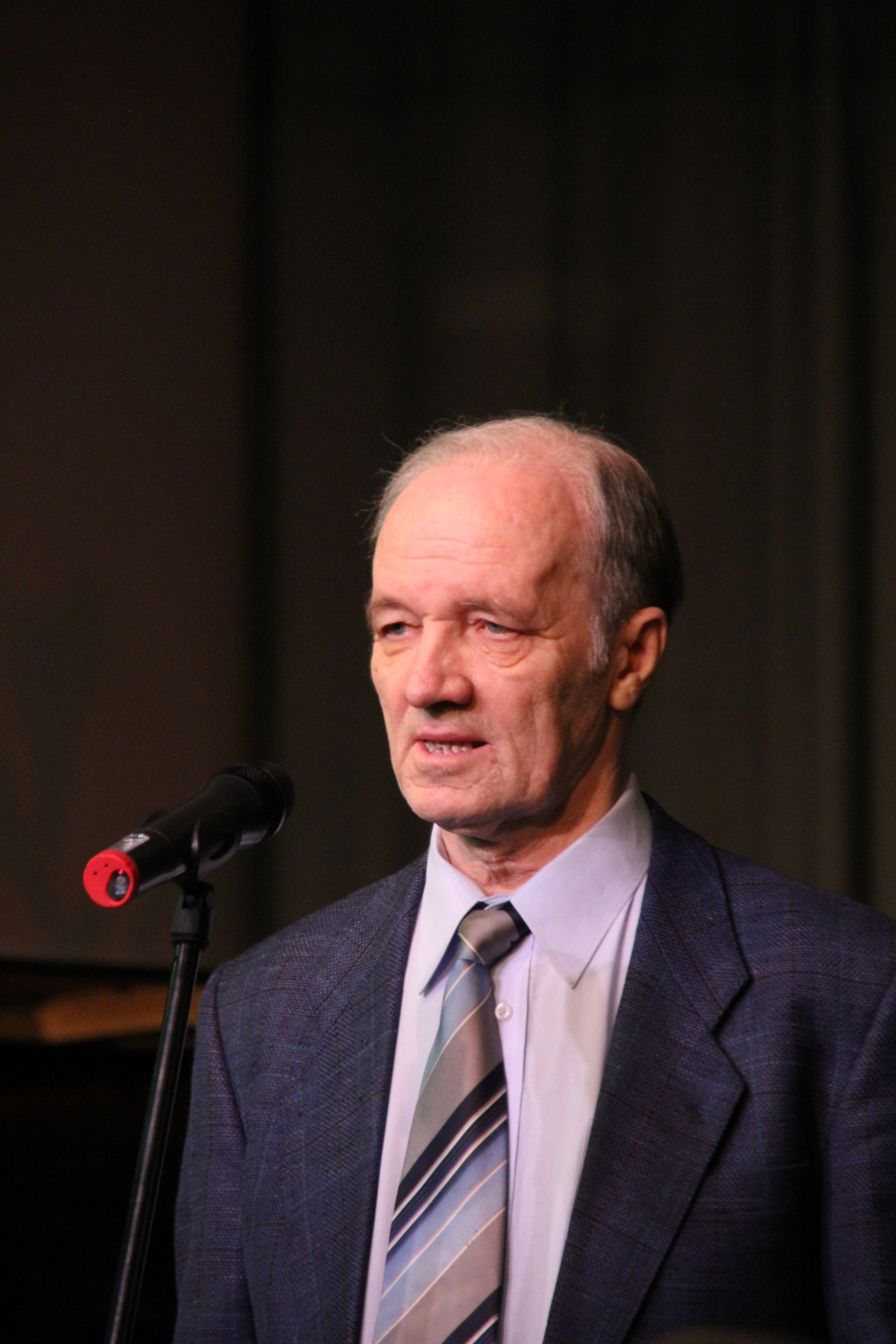
Ülo Tuulik in 2011

Ülo Tuulik (born 22 February 1940, in Abruka Island, Saare County) is an Estonian writer.

In 1963, he graduated from Tartu State University in philology. From 1964-1966, he was the chairman of Young Authors' Association in Tallinn. Since 1974, he was a member of Estonian Writers' Union.

His twin brother was writer Jüri Tuulik (1940-2014) and his cousin was writer Juhan Smuul.

== Selected works ==
- 1972: prose collection Vihm Gibraltaris
- 1974: novel Sõja jalus ('In the Way of War')
- 1979: prose collection Atlandi kirjad: jutustused
