= Vello Orumets =

Estonian singer

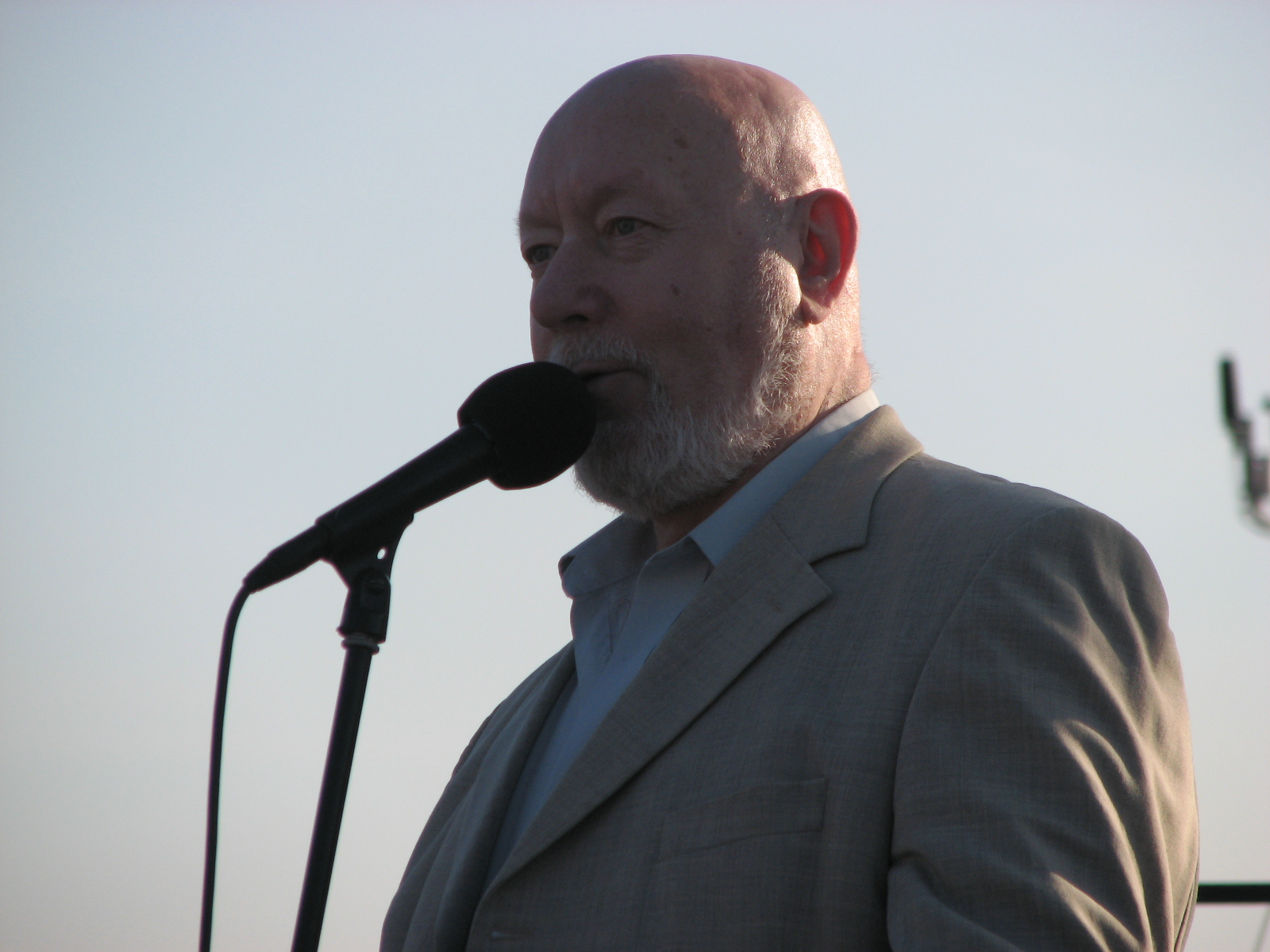
Vello Orumets in 2011

Vello Orumets (28 June 1941 Viljandi – 26 May 2012 Tartu) was an Estonian singer.

In 1960 he graduated from Estonian SSR State Philharmonic's stage studio. From In 1959–1962 he studied music pedagogy at the Tallinn Pedagogical Institute. From 1960 until 1977, he was a soloist for the band Laine, and 1978-1988 for the band Erfia.

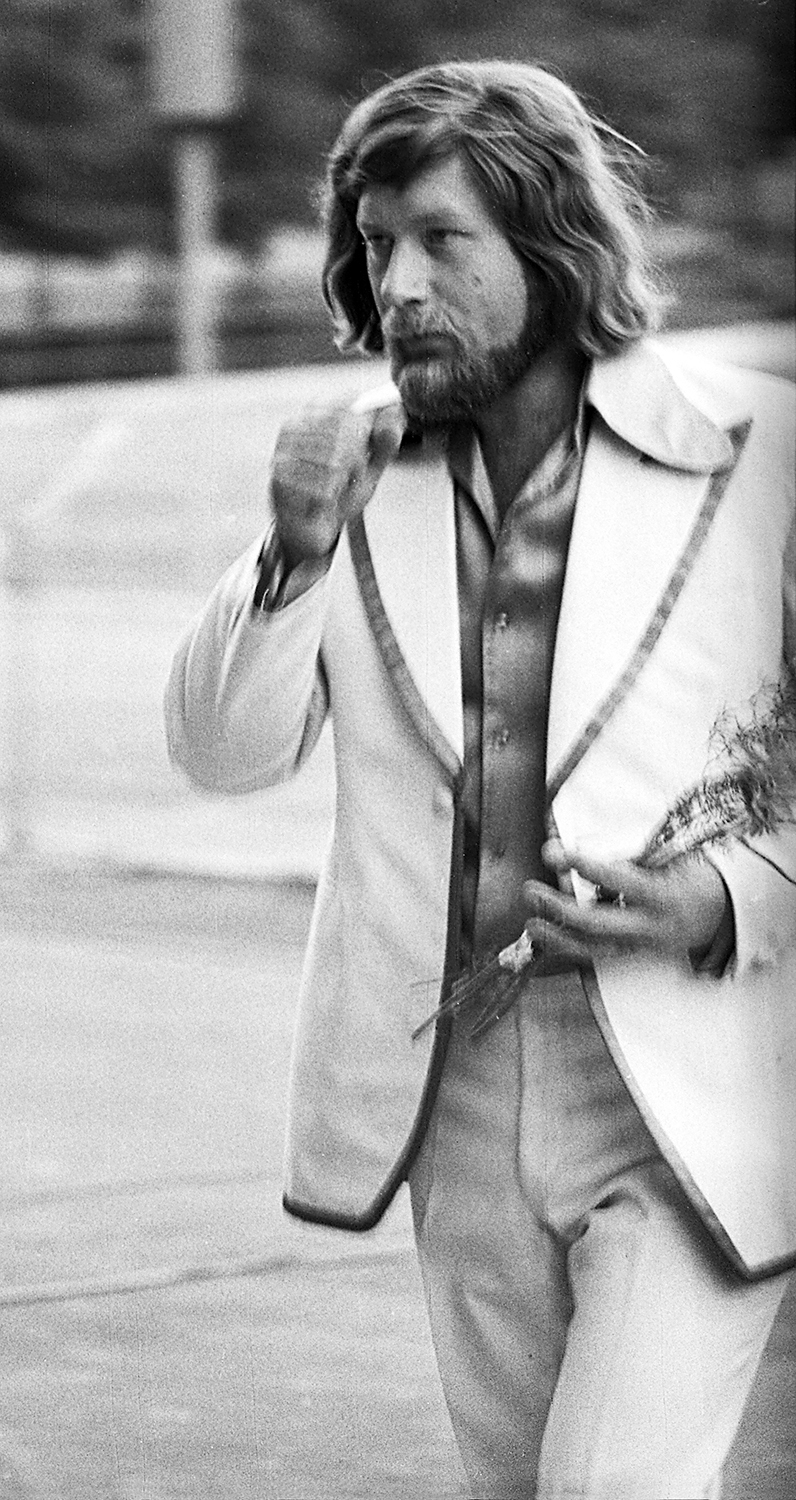
Vello Orumets in 1975

In total, he recorded eight solo albums.

== Songs ==
- "Miniseelik"
- "Rannapiiga"
- "Kui kõnnib mannekeen"
- "Las mööduvad aastad"
- "Kolm kaunist sõna"

== Albums ==
- 1982: "Vello Orumets"
- 1996: "Kolm Kaunist Sõna"
- 1999: "Vello Orumets
- 2000: "Valged Jõulud"
- 2002: "Sõbrale"
- 2009: "Igatsus on armastus"
