= Henno Käo =

Estonian writer, illustrator and musician

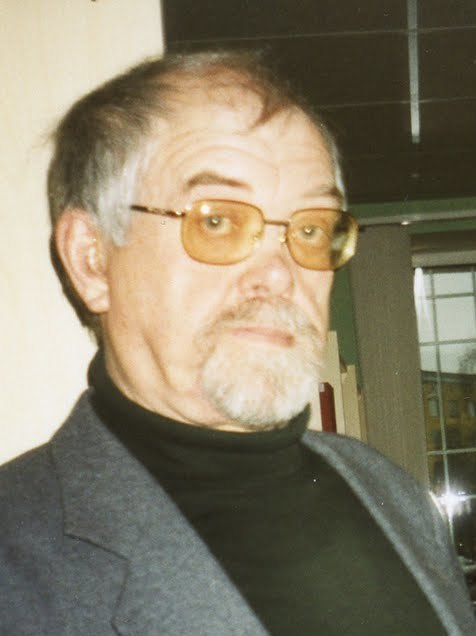
Henno Käo'

Henno Käo (10 January 1942 – 2 July 2004) was an Estonian children's writer, book illustrator, poet, and musician.

== Biography ==
He was born in the village of Allikalahe in Saare County. In 1964 he graduated from Tartu Art School in decorative art. From 1975 to 1978 he studied at Villu Toots' school of calligraphy. From 1963 to 1968 he worked for Tallinnfilm, being an artist on puppet films. From 1969 to 1982, he was an artist at Directorate of Recreational Parks of Tallinn.

From 1991 he was a member of Estonian Writers' Union.

He was one of the founders of the folk-rock group Peoleo.

== Selected works ==
All his books are illustrated by himself.

- 1985: children's book Suure Kivi lood ('Stories of the Great Stone')
- 1989: children's book Oliüks ('Onceupon')
- 1999: children's book Kaheksajalgade planeet ('Planet of the Octopuses')
