= Arne Oit =

Estonian composer and accordionist

Arne Oit (3 December 1928 Tallinn – 28 November 1975 Tallinn) was an Estonian composer and accordionist. He was focused on writing pop music.

In 1956, he graduated from Tallinn State Conservatory majoring in composition.

1955–1974, he played the accordion for Estonian Radio Instrumental Ensemble.

On the initiative of Oit, the song contest "Tippmeloodia" was organized.

Since 1958, he was a member of Estonian Composers' Union.

== Awards ==
- 1972 Estonian SSR Merited Worker of Art
- 1973 Estonian Music Annual Award

== Works ==
Selected songs

- "Kevadine lugu" (1957)
- "Meie Mall" (1959)
- "Lõke preerias" (1963)
- "Jamaika hällilaul" (1961)
- "Me pole enam väikesed" (1970)
