= Jaan Arder =

Estonian singer

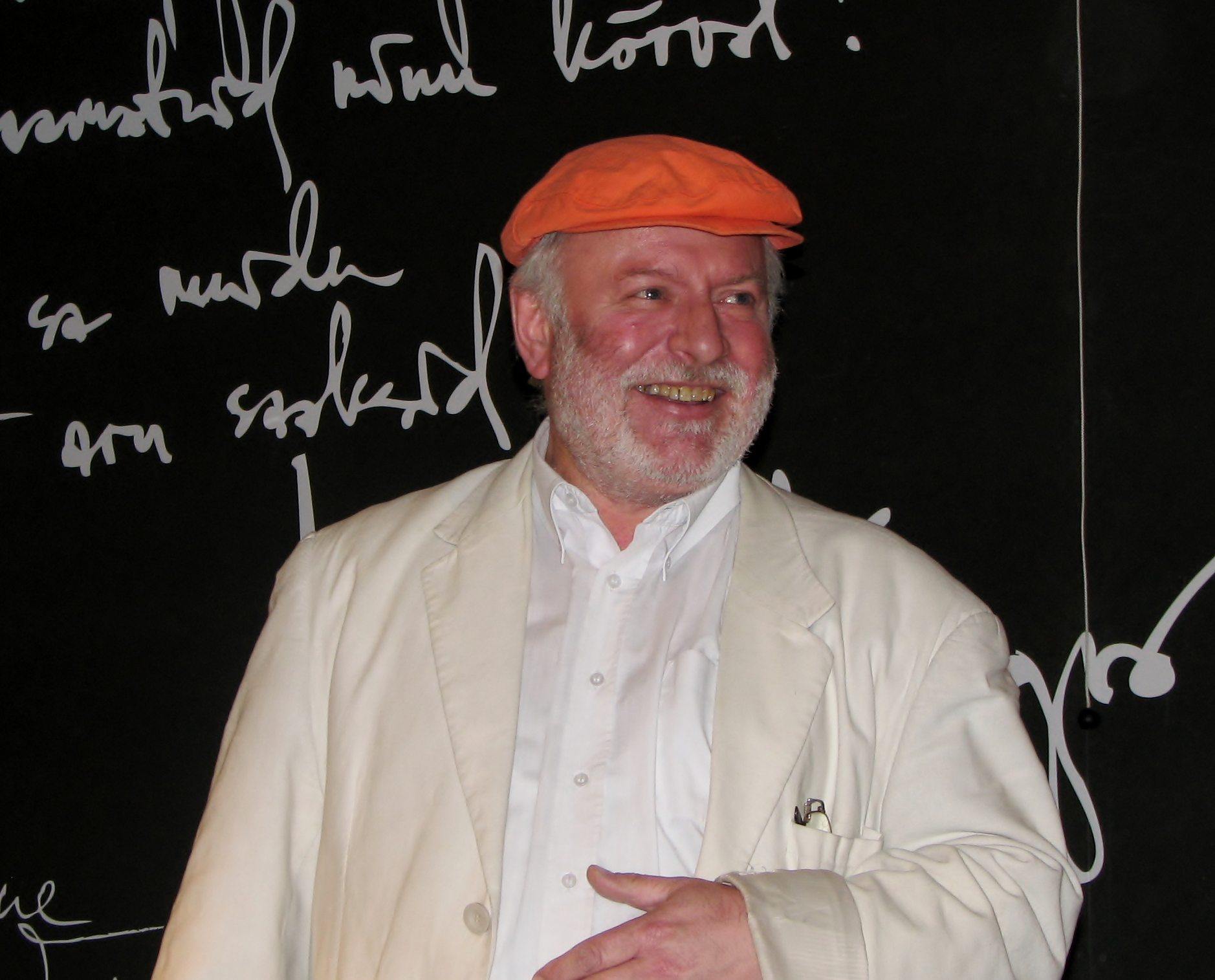
Jaan Arder in 2012.

Jaan Arder (born 26 February 1952, in Tallinn – 24 July 2014) was an Estonian singer. He was a member of the rock band Apelsin and the early music ensemble Hortus Musicus.

His older brother Ott Arder was a poet, children's writer and translator. He is interred at the Alexander Nevsky Cemetery, Tallinn.
