= Ott Arder =

Estonian writer

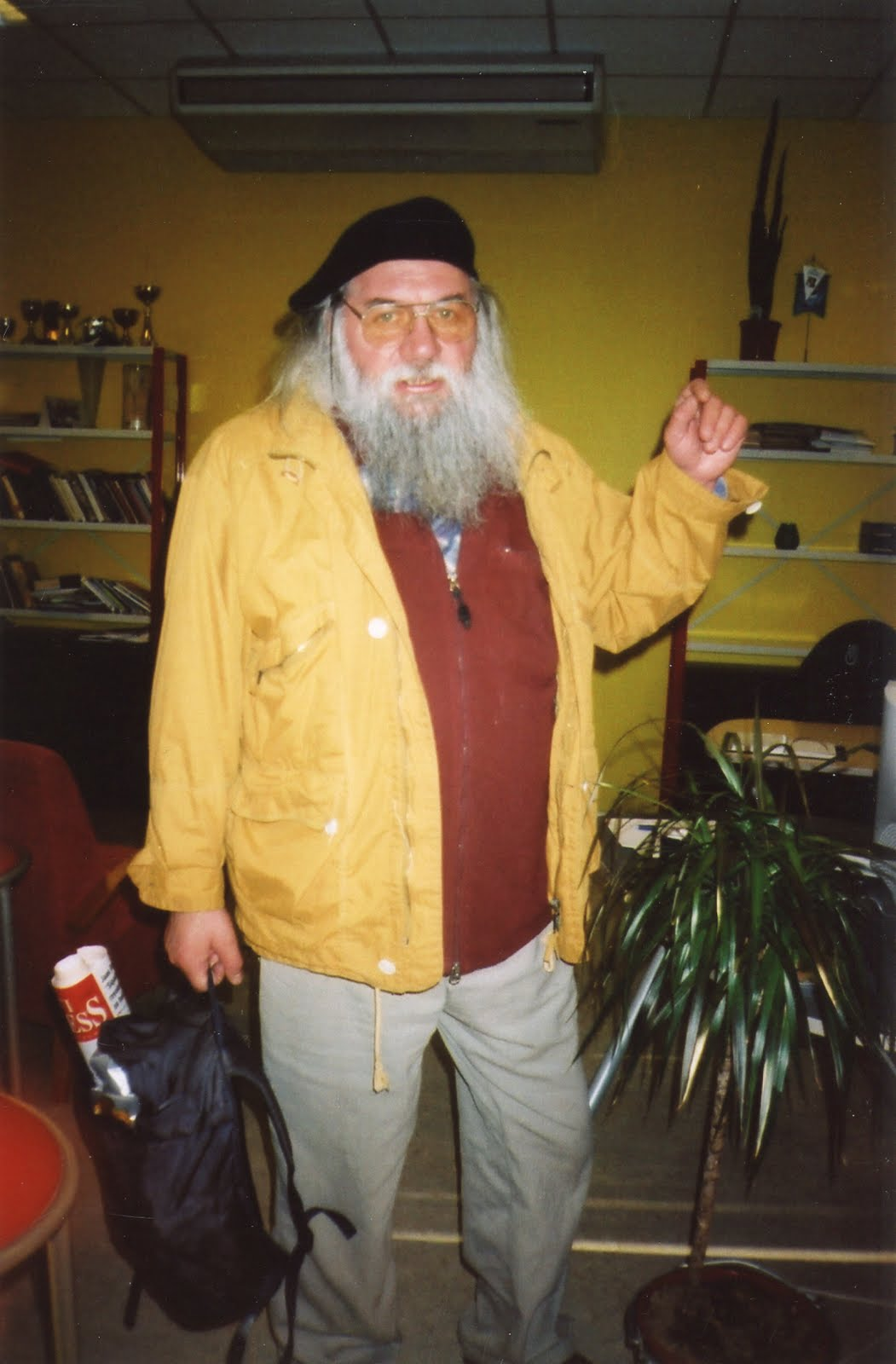
Ott Arder (2004)

Ott Arder (26 February 1950 in Tallinn – 26 June 2004 in Kassari) was an Estonian poet, children's writer and translator. He was also the author of several popular songs and written texts.

From 1990, he was a member of the Estonian Writers' Union. His younger brother, Jaan Arder was a musician.

Arder was found dead on 26 June 2004 on a beach in Kassari near his summer home. The cause of death was an accidental drowning. He was interred at the Siselinna Cemetery in Tallinn.
