= Albert Uustulnd =

Estonian writer

Albert Uustulnd (6 November 1925 in Suure-Rootsi – 9 August 1997 Kuressaare) was an Estonian writer and playwright.

In 1954, he graduated from Tallinn University of Technology in economics. After graduating he worked as a fisherman, later also as a building site foreman.

He died in 1997 and he is buried at Kudjape Cemetery, near Kuressaare.

== Works ==
- novel "Meri põleb" (1969)
- novel "Avali väraval" (1977)
- novel "Meri, mehed ja jumalad" (1980)
- novel "Tuulte tallermaa" I part (1985); II part (1990)
- novel "Lambeti graafik" (1987)
- novel "Acheroni kaldal" (1991)
- novel "Lummav meri" (1994)
- novel "Rajud ei rauge" (1994)
- novel "Kui jumalad nutsid" (1995)
- novel "Hullunud meri" (1996)
- novel "Tormid ei taltu" (1996)
- novel "Rannavälja" (1997)
- novel "Ohtlikud hoovused" (1998)
