= Georg Ots Tallinn Music College =

Music school in Tallinn, Estonia

Georg Ots Music School of Tallinn
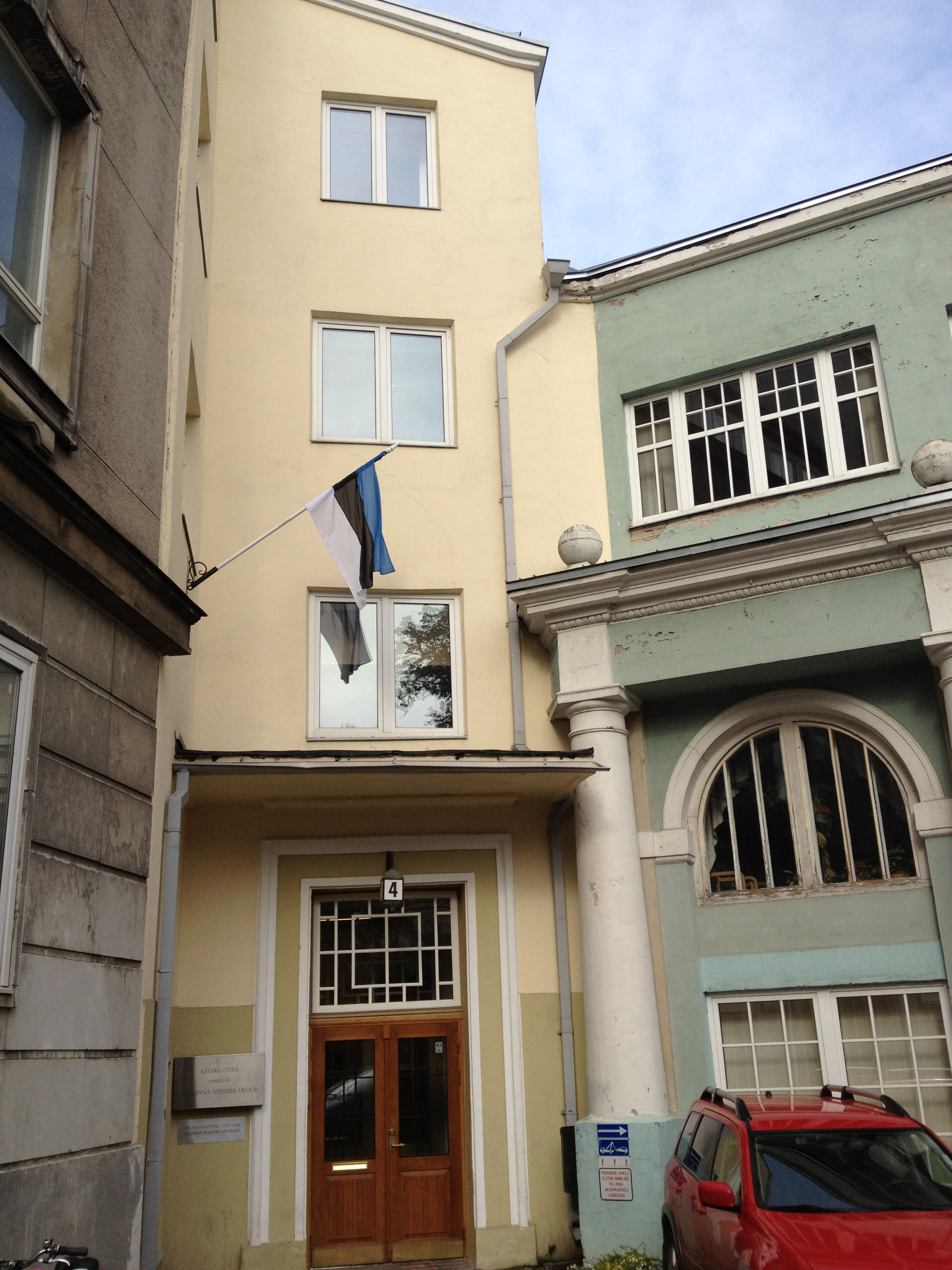
- School building (September 2012)
- Type: Public
- Established: 1944
- Location: Vabaduse väljak 4, 10142 Tallinn, Estonia, Tallinn, Estonia; 59°26′05″N 24°44′44″E
- Campus: Urban
- Website: otsakool.edu.ee

Georg Ots Music School of Tallinn (Estonian: Georg Otsa nimeline Tallinna Muusikakool) was a music school in Tallinn, Estonia.

The school was formed 1944 from Tallinn Higher Music School (founded in 1919). In 2019, the school celebrated its 100th anniversary. Georg Ots Music School of Tallinn was closed in spring 2022; since September 2022, similar education is provided by Tallinn School of Music and Ballet which was formed by merger of TMHS, Georg Ots Music School of Tallinn, and Tallinn Ballet School.

== Names of the school ==
- 1944–1949 State Music School of Tallinn
- 1949–1975 Music School of Tallinn
- 1975–2022 Georg Ots Music School of Tallinn

== Alumni ==
See: Category:Tallinn Georg Ots Music School alumni
