= Aegviidu =

Borough in Harju County, Estonia

Aegviidu Charlottenhof
- Borough
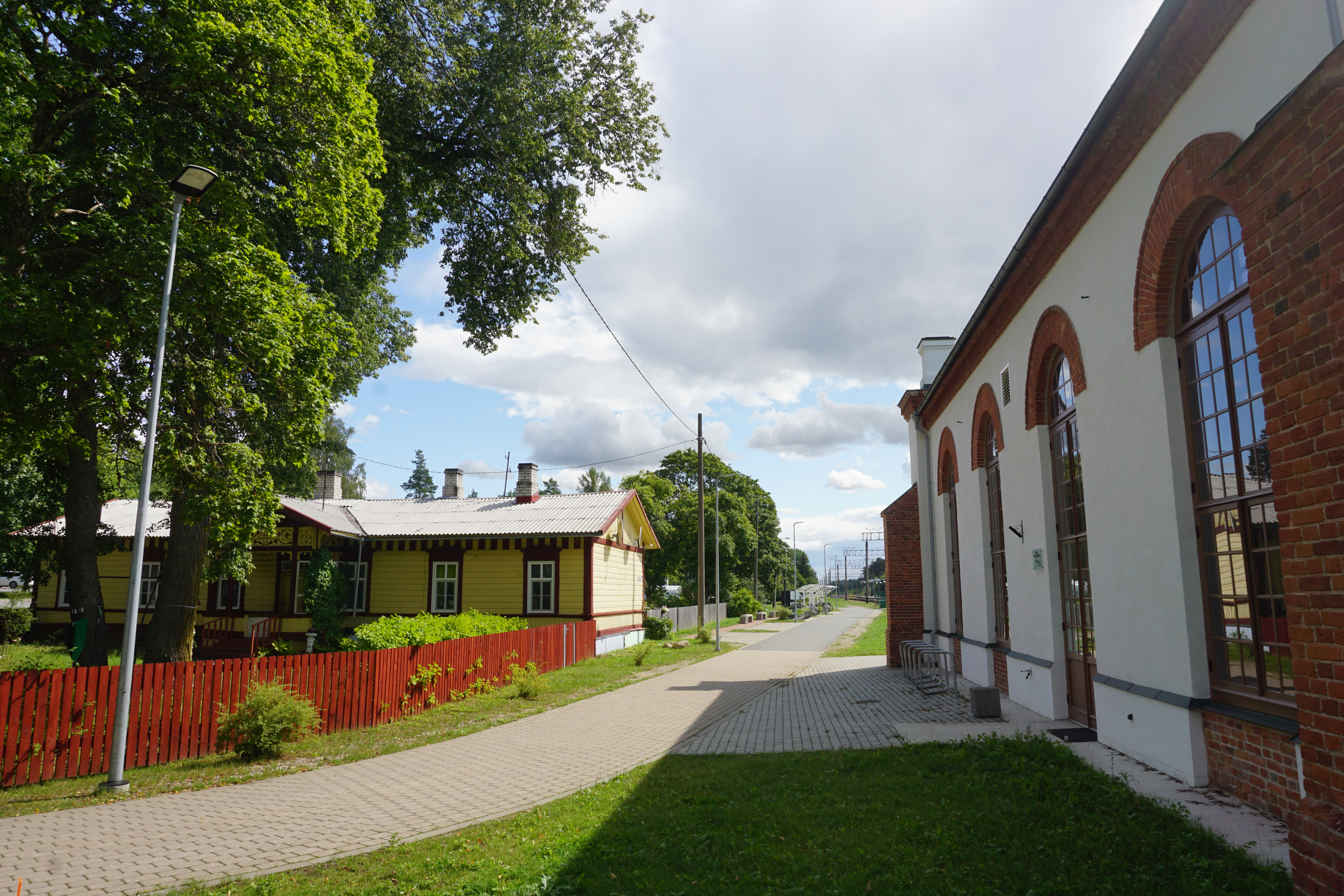
- Aegviidu railway station
- Nickname: The Hiking Capital
- Location in Estonia
- Coordinates: 59°17′11″N 25°36′36″E
- Country: Estonia
- County: Harju County
- Municipality: Anija Parish
- First historical record: 1522
- Borough rights: 1945

Area
  - Total: 11.97 km^{2} (4.62 sq mi)
- Highest elevation: 84.5 m (277 ft)
- Lowest elevation: 64.0 m (210.0 ft)

Population (22.11.2022)
  - Total: 695
  - Density: 58.1/km^{2} (150/sq mi)

Ethnicity (2021)
  - Estonians: 89.7%
  - other: 10.3%
- Postal Codes: 74501, 74594

Drone video of Aegviidu blue springs

Drone video of Aegviidu water tower

Aegviidu is a borough in Anija Parish, Harju County, Estonia, most known for its picturesque surroundings and hiking trails.

The borough is situated along the Tallinn-Narva railway and Piibe road, housing both the Aegviidu TV Mast (107m) and the terminus of the Tallinn-Aegviidu railway line.

As of November 22, 2022, the borough had a population of 695.

== Etymology ==
Aegviidu was first mentioned in the will of Baron Johan von Bremen of Lehtse in 1522 as Agevidt farm. Before 1796, the area had also been referred to as Aykeuyte, Aykwit, Aigkewit, Aigwido, and Aegwiid. In 1796, Count Ludwig August Mellin referred to the settlement as Aegwiid on his topographic map of the Tallinn Kreis, as part of The Livonian Atlas.

On the 1805 topographic map of the Governorate of Estonia, the settlement was referred to as Charlottenhof (Russian: Шарлоттенгофъ), on the 1840 topographic map of the Gulf of Finland as both Aigvitu (Russian: Аигвиту) and Charlotenhof (Russian: Шарлотенгофъ), and on the 1844 topographic map of the Governorate of Estonia as Charlottenberg. The prefix of Charlotte- is likely a reference to Charlotte Dorothea von Friesell, wife of Lord Alexander Georg von Hoyningen-Huene of Lehtse. The new name stuck around until Estonia first became independent and place names were estonianized.

Some sources claim that the name Aegviidu first appeared in the 18th century, when the Piibe road was being built through the local bogs, or in the 19th century, when the Tallinn-Narva railway was being built, which took lots of time (Aeg (English: time) + viidu (English: spend)). These theories are disproven by the fact that the first written record of the name being used is from the 16th century.

Another theory claims that the name Aegviidu comes from the name of Saint Aegidius, which seems unlikely, as there are no surviving records of him being worshipped in Estonia.

== History ==
=== Early history ===
It is speculated that during the antiquity a winter road passed through the area of Aegviidu that connected Kehra and Jäneda. The ancient Jäneda hillfort is located just a few kilometers southeast of current Aegviidu, on the coast of Kalijärv. The hillfort was likely in use between the 11th and 13th centuries.

Kosenõmme (Cosgenomne), which is located in the northern part of modern Aegviidu, was given to Lehtse manor in 1379. In 1467, the Kosenõmme mill had been referred to as Kossgen-Nomme. By 1510, the mill had seemingly disappeared, when Kossenem only referred to a regular farm. In 1511, the farm had been referred to as Kaszenum.

Aegviidu was first mentioned in the will of Baron Johan von Bremen of Lehtse in 1522 as Agevidt farm. The section of Piibe road, that passes through current Aegviidu was likely first built sometime during the 17th century. At the beginning of the 18th century there are reports of an inn operating in the vicinity of Aegviidu. In 1714, there are records of Aigwido Mart from Koseneme, while in 1755 there are records of Aegwidi Jaan from Aegwiid, suggesting that what would eventually become Aegviidu was initially part of Kosenõmme. In 1796, Count Ludwig August Mellin referred to Aegviidu as Aegwiid on his topographic map of the Tallinn Kreis, as part of The Livonian Atlas.

=== Manor ===
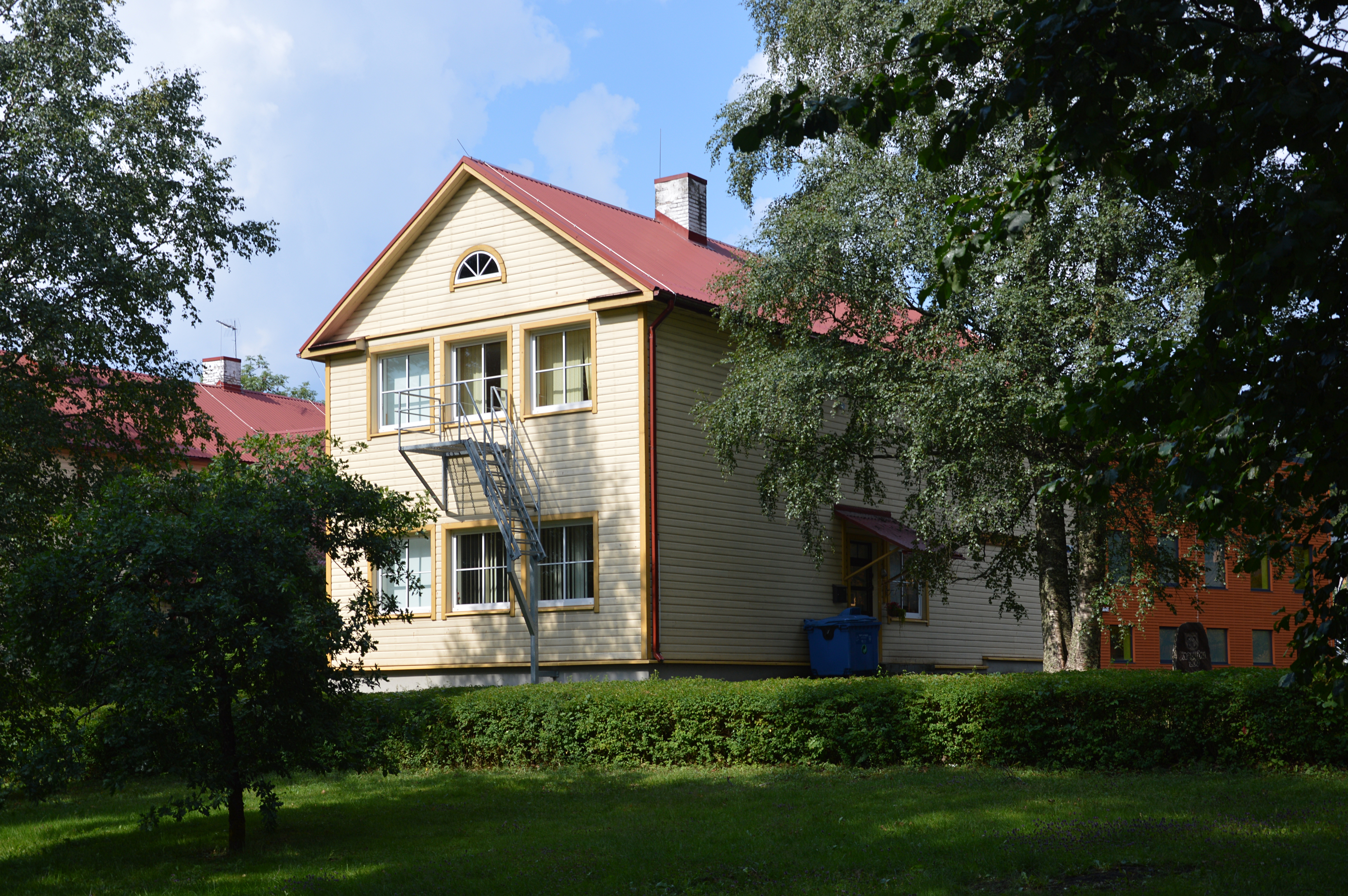
Aegviidu school

On the 1805 topographic map of the Governorate of Estonia, the settlement was referred to as Charlottenhof, likely a reference to Charlotte Dorothea von Friesell, wife of the then Lord of Lehtse. In 1820, there are records of a coaching inn and a hunting lodge in the settlement. At approximately the same time, Chartlottenhof cattle manor (German: Hoflage, Estonian: Karjamõis) is also mentioned, being located near the current Piibe road railway crossing point and belonging to the Lehtse manor. By the beginning of the 20th century, a post office, a pharmacy, and a general store had been built in the settlement. In 1917, the Lord of Lehtse gifted the Aegviidu hunting lodge to a local educational society and a school started operating there. Since the hunting lodge was not fit to be a schoolhouse, the educational society acquired the coaching inn from the Lord in 1919, and the school has operated there ever since. The hunting lodge is currently used as a community center.

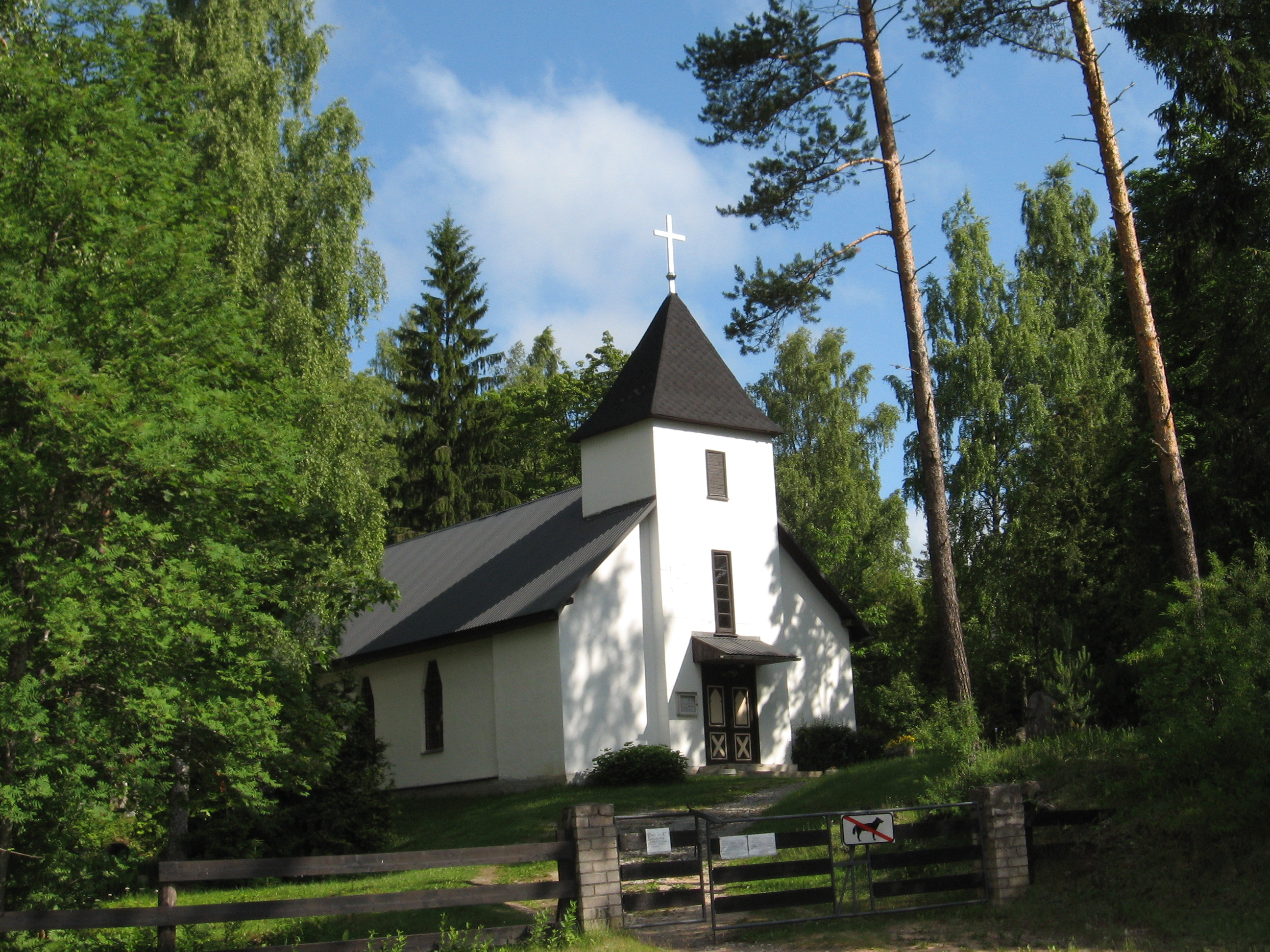
Aegviidu Alexander church

On December 6, 1896, the Alexandra chapel of Aegviidu was solemnly consecrated, being later renamed to Alexander chapel of Aegviidu. The current tower of the chapel was built in 1940. The chapel was badly damaged in the March bombings of 1944. The insides of the chapel were thoroughly renovated in the 1970s. Lehtse manor, along its subsidiaries, was nationalized in 1919.

=== Railway ===
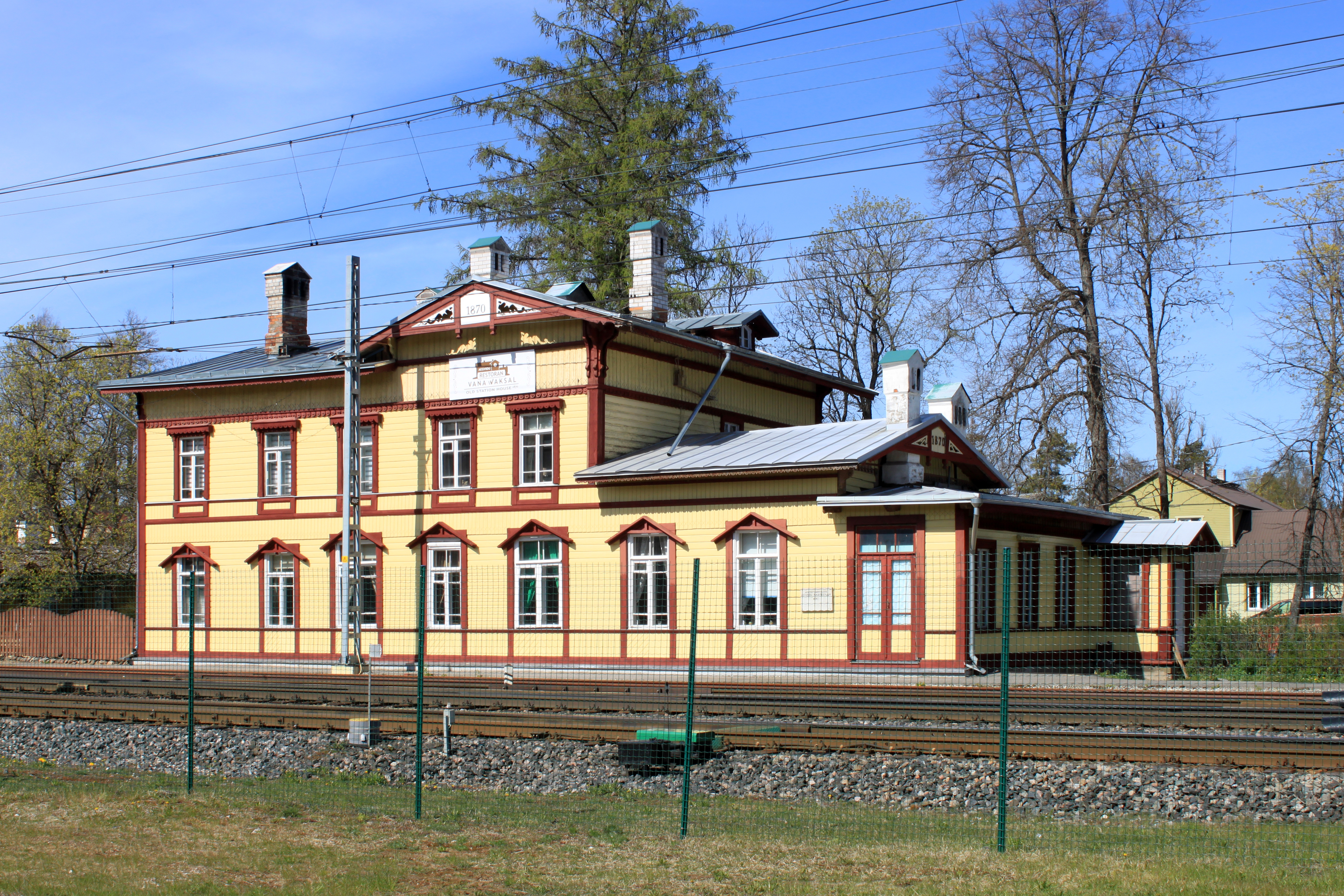
Aegviidu railway station building

In 1870, the St. Petersburg-Tallinn-Paldiski railway commenced operations, with Aegviidu serving as a class III station. The station's two-story historistic wooden building features an asymmetric facade and a low, multisectional gable roof, similar to buildings in Keila and Paldiski. The railway, along with the construction of a water tower and a locomotive depot, greatly accelerated the growth of Aegviidu, which was previously sparsely populated.

Just before the Estonian War of Independence, Konstantin Päts assigned Eduard Piibemann to organize the Aegviidu self-defense force. On the night of February 24, 1918, the force detained a Russian detachment near the railroad in Aegviidu and confiscated their weapons. Although the Soviets briefly captured Aegviidu on January 1, 1919, the Estonians recaptured it by railway on January 5, 1919, a day after the decisive Battle of Kehra.

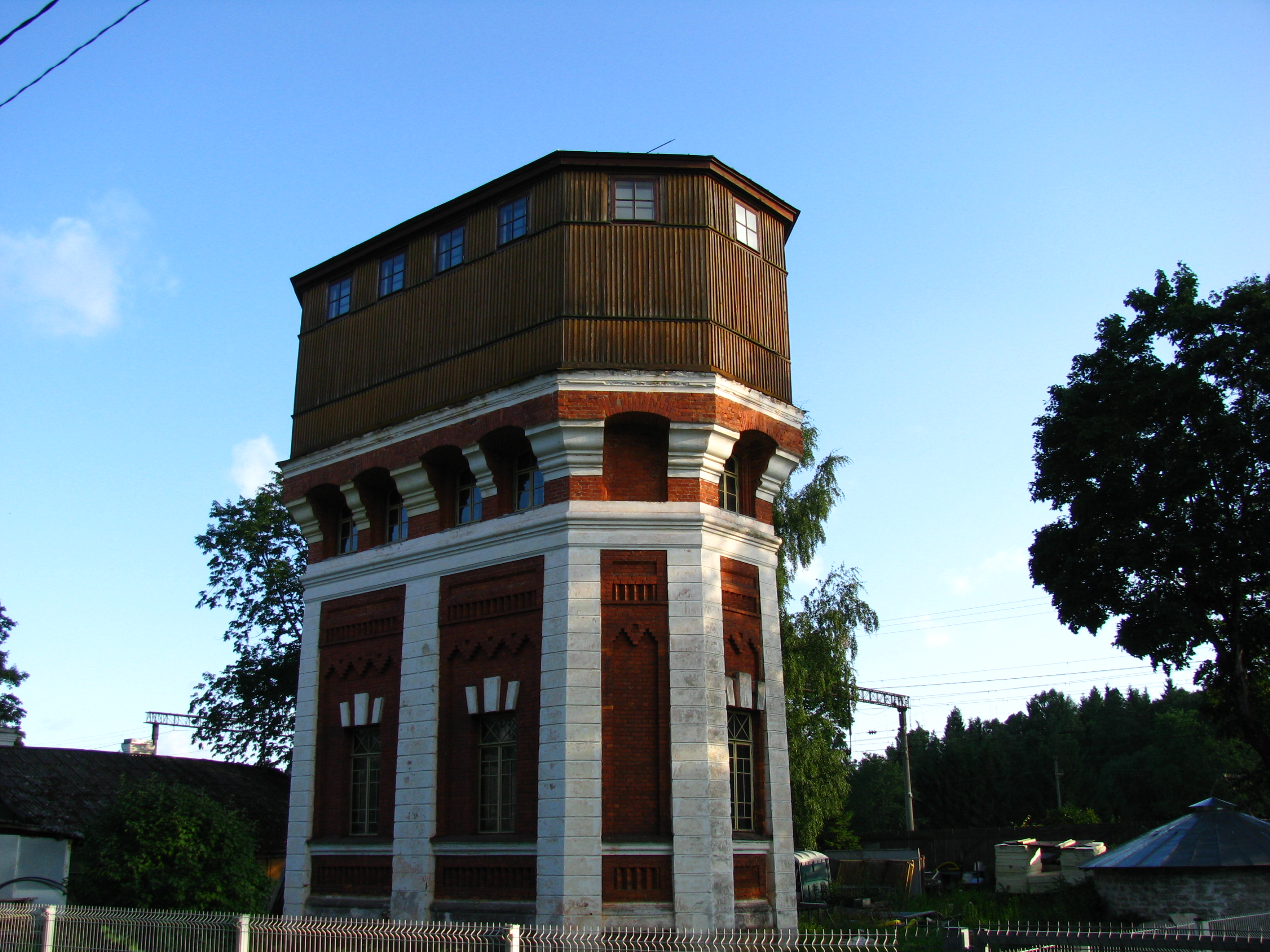
Aegviidu water tower

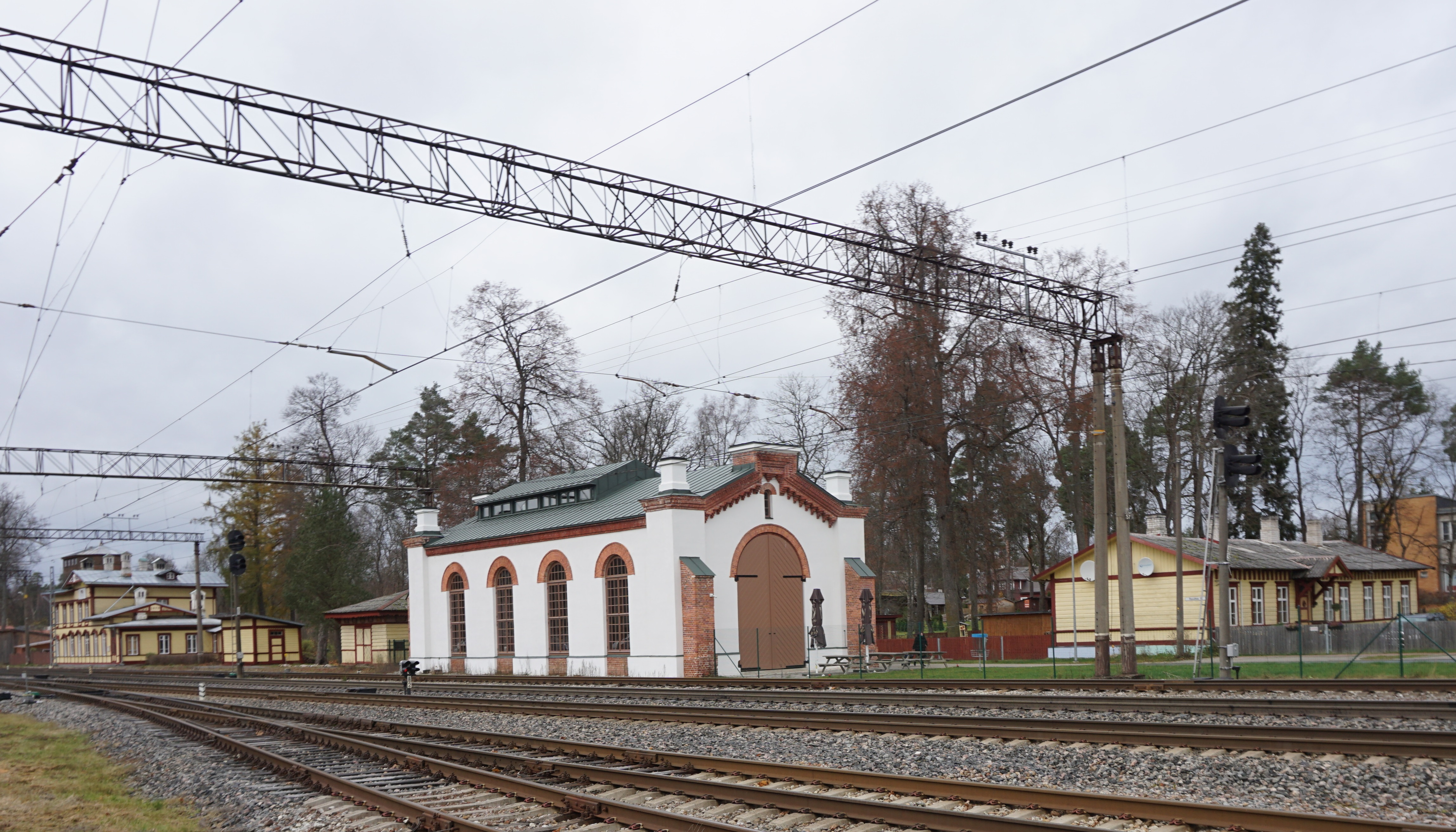
Aegviidu locomotive depot

The Tallinn-Aegviidu railway line saw further development, with the first electrified train between Kehra and Aegviidu running on August 3, 1978, and the second pair of rails from Aegviidu to Kehra and Lehtse laid in 1987 and 1991, respectively. The electrified part of the Tallinn-Tapa railway terminates roughly halfway between Aegviidu and Nelijärve railway stations. The new Stadler FLIRT trains began servicing the Tallinn-Aegviidu line on July 1, 2013.

The Nelijärve railway station was opened in the early 1940s to provide convenient access to the Nelijärve recreation center, which was built in 1938 on the shore of Purgatsi lake. The development of Aegviidu slowed down after the second world war.

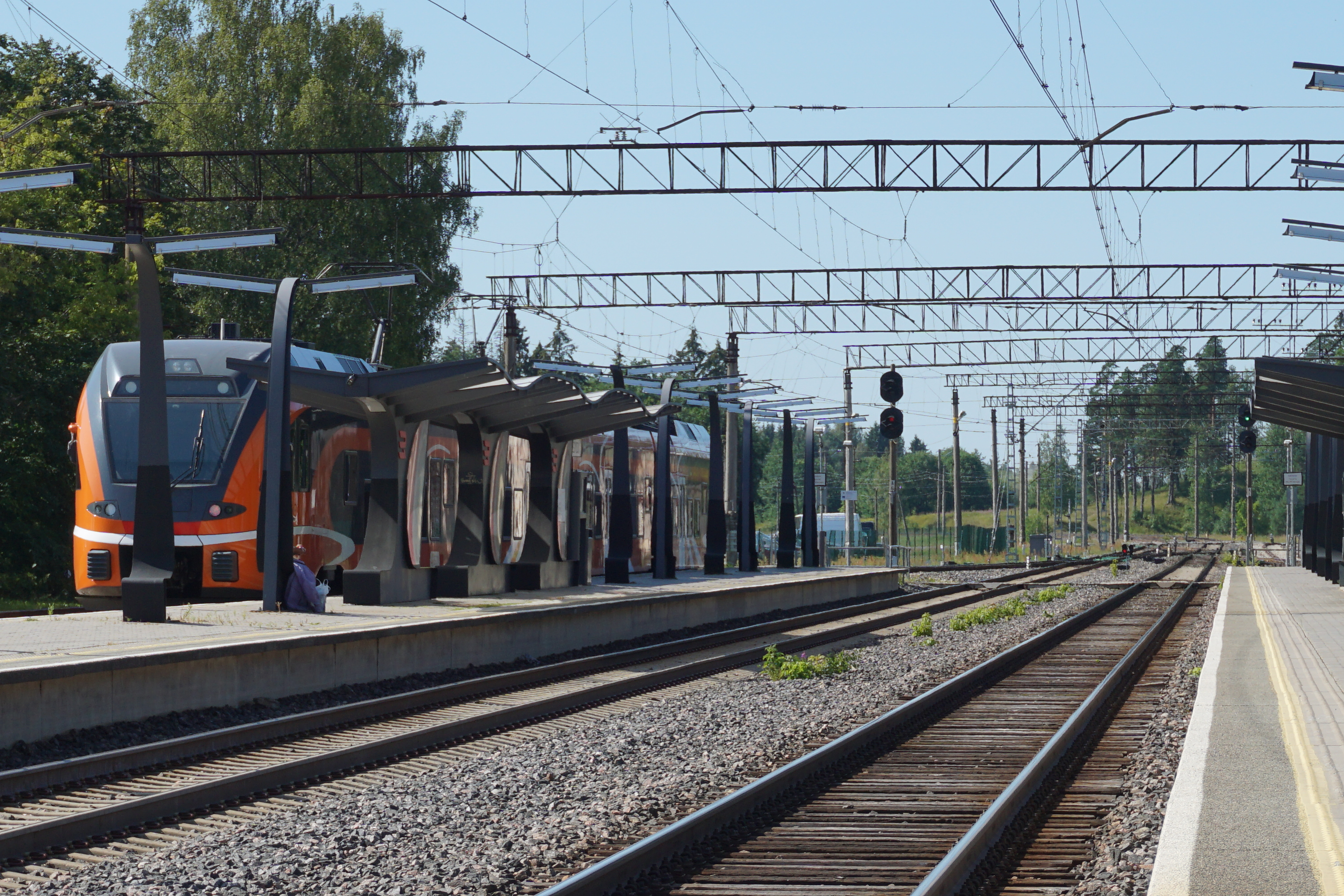
Aegviidu railway station

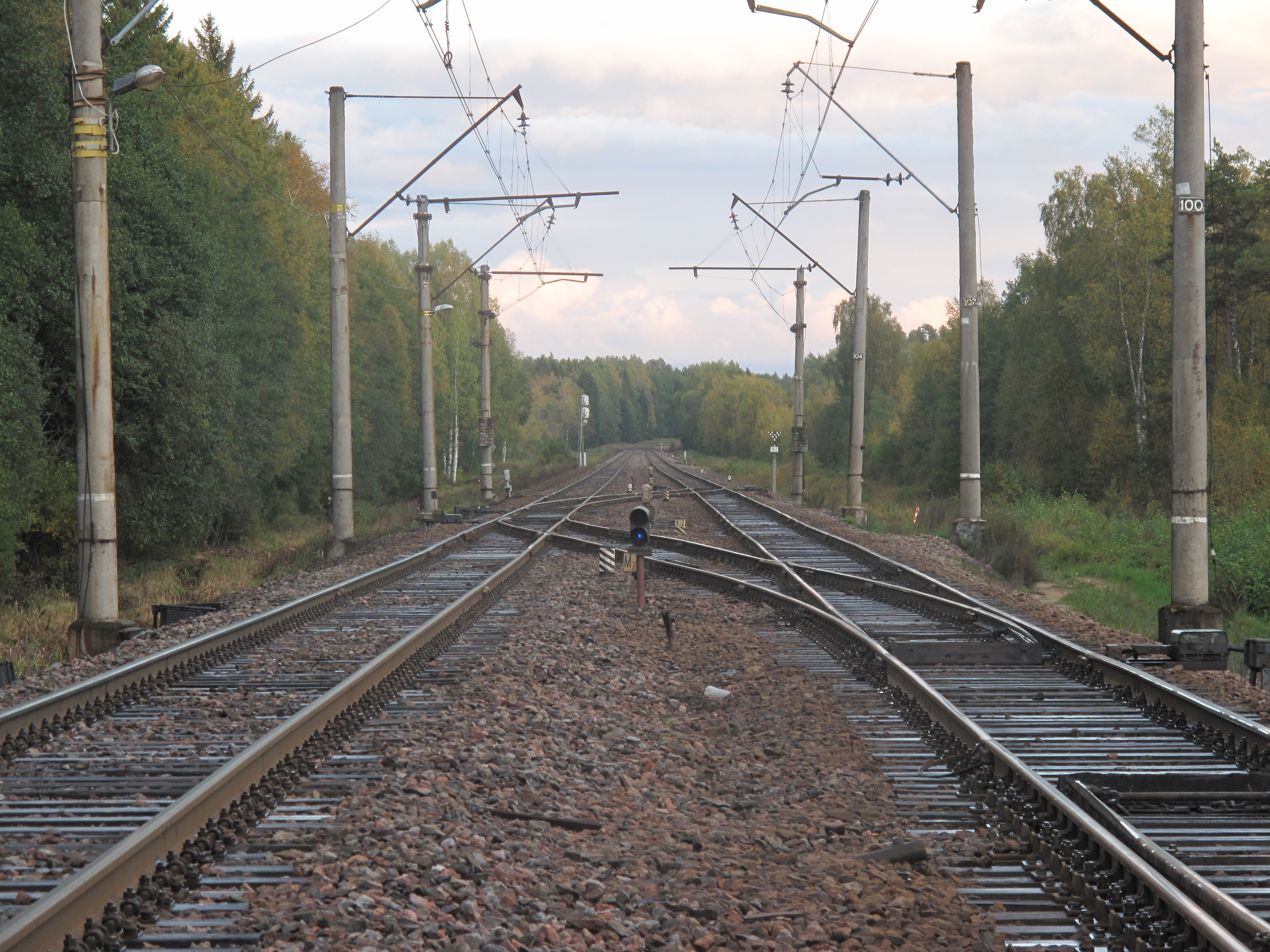
End of electrified railway in Aegviidu

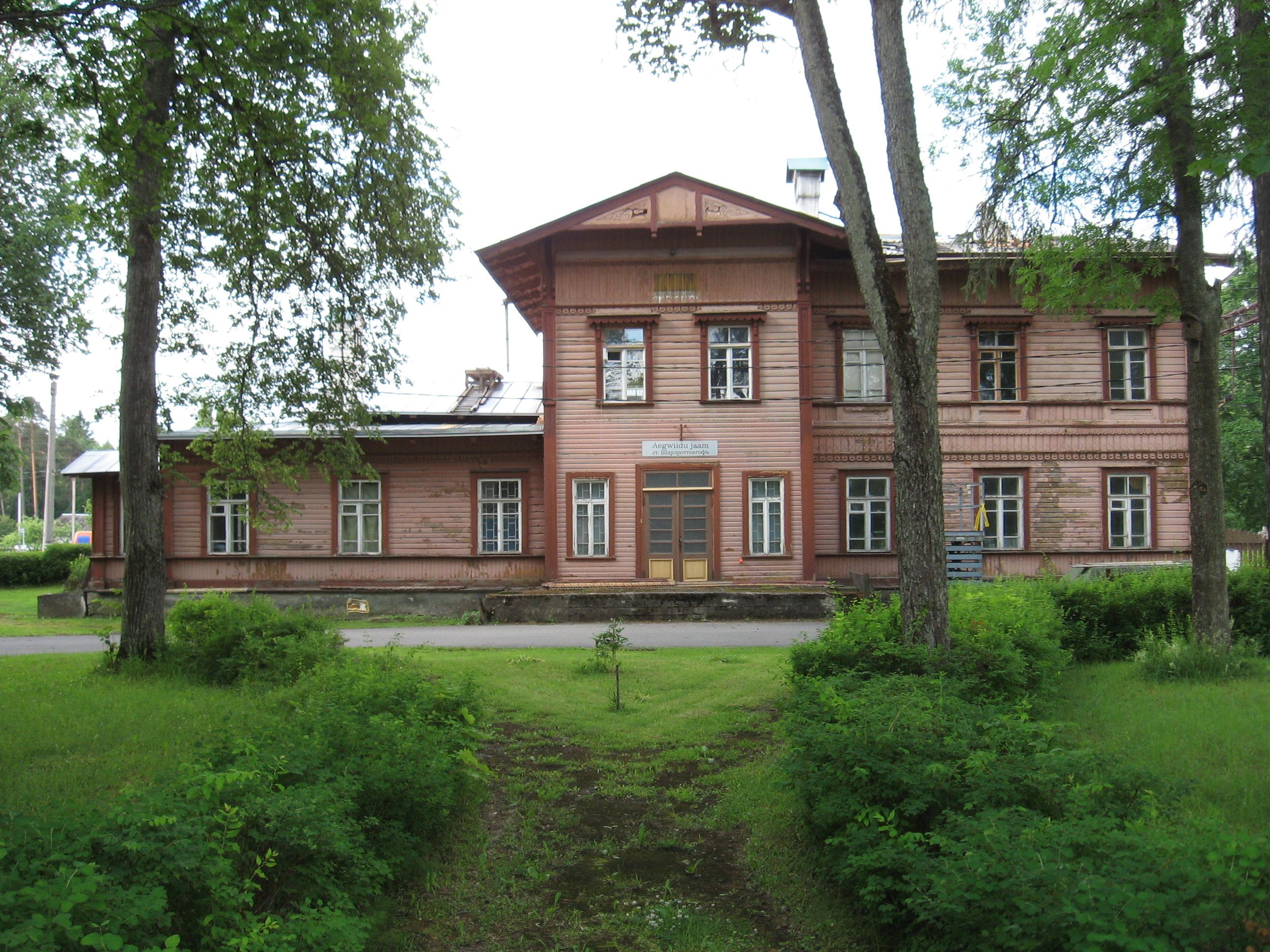
Aegviidu railway station building before renovation

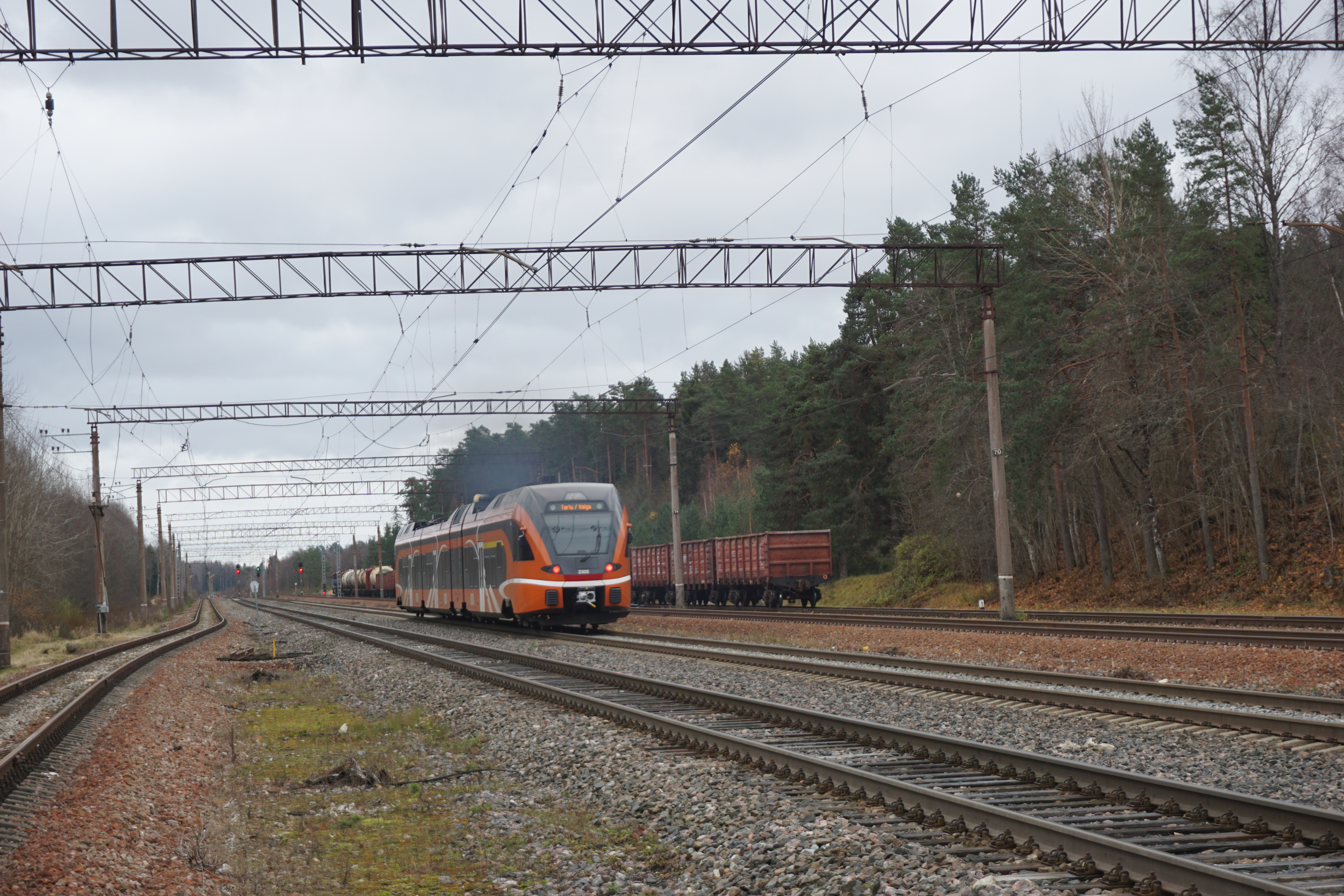
Railway near Aegviidu

=== Politics ===
Aegviidu gained the rights of a summering borough in 1926 and the rights of a borough in 1945. Aegviidu has been a part of Tapa, Paide, and Harju regions since 1950, 1962, and 1962, respectively. The borough became self-governing on June 20, 1991, and became a borough-parish on August 25, 1993. Aegviidu became a part of Anija parish on October 21, 2017.

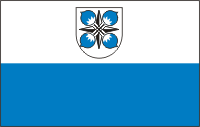
Former flag of Aegviidu parish

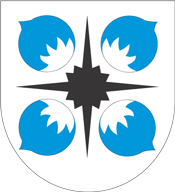
Former coat of arms of Aegviidu parish

== Geography ==
=== Nature ===
The nature of Aegviidu is characterized by its many hills, lakes, bogs, and huge forests. The area offers a range of hiking trails and well-developed infrastructure, including well-built roads, easy access, and gear rental points.

The Aegviidu area is traversed by two rivers, Mustjõgi and Jänijõgi, which both eventually flow into the Jägala River. Mustjõgi meanders north of the Nelijärve train station and through the Kosenõmme district, while Jänijõgi flows south of the Nelijärve lakes. The two rivers are separated by just one kilometer at their narrowest point, which is occupied by the Nelijärve lakes, the Piibe road, and the Tallinn-Narva railway.

The Nelijärve (English: four lakes) area in southeastern Aegviidu is named after the four lakes visible from the Nelijärvemägi hill (89.2m): Purgatsi, Urbukse, Ahvenajärv, and Sisalikujärv. The fifth lake, Linajärv, is located just south of the four lakes, but is not visible from the hill. The lakes are separated by interconnected ridges, ranging from Aegviidu to Jäneda. Additionally, lakes Nikerjärv and Vahejärv are located right beside the Piibe road, a few hundred meters northwest of the other lakes, towards the center of Aegviidu. In total, there are seven lakes in the Nelijärve area.

The Aegviidu Blue Springs, located in a bog around two kilometers southeast of Nelijärve in Jäneda village, feature approximately 20 springs, characterized by their distinct greenish-blue tint.

Aegviidu is located in the northern part of the Kõrvemaa region, which is a sparsely populated area predominantly covered by wetlands and forests. The areas south of both Piibe road and Tallinn-Narva railway are a part of Kõrvemaa Landscape Conservation Area. The Põhja-Kõrvemaa Nature Reserve is located a few kilometers north of Aegviidu and is accessible by a light traffic road. Additionally, the smaller Niinsoni and Maapaju nature conservation sites are located between Aegviidu and Kehra. Aegviidu is the center of the Aegviidu recreation area. There are many hiking trails in the area, with the president's trail (Estonian: presidendirada), going from Aegviidu to Jäneda, being the most well known. In addition, there are several camping grounds nearby.

=== Climate ===
Aegviidu, Estonia(1991-2023)

Climate chart (precipitation, max. and min. temperature)
J	F	M	A	M	J	J	A	S	O	N	D
53 −3 −9	45 −3 −9	34 2 −6	33 9 0	47 16 5	69 20 10	84 23 13	84 21 12	54 15 8	68 8 2	57 2 −2	53 −2 −7
- █ Average max. and min. temperatures in °C
- █ Precipitation totals in mm
- Source: MSN Weather
Imperial conversion
J	F	M	A	M	J	J	A	S	O	N	D
2.1 27 16	1.8 27 16	1.3 36 21	1.3 48 32	1.9 61 41	2.7 68 50	3.3 73 55	3.3 70 54	2.1 59 46	2.7 46 36	2.2 36 28	2.1 28 19
- █ Average max. and min. temperatures in °F
- █ Precipitation totals in inches

Aegviidu is in the transition zone between maritime and continental climates. On average, the annual temperature is 5.0 °C, the annual rainfall is 700mm, and wind mostly blows from west and south-west. There are about 1750 hours of sunshine per year.

According to MSN weather, the highest known temperature was recorded in August, 2010, being 34 °C, and the lowest known temperature was recorded in December, 1996, being −35 °C.

=== Geology ===
According to maps of Estonian geology, released by the Estonian Land Board, in the Aegviidu area, the basement is located approximately 200 meters below the sea level and the upper layer consists primarily of biotite gneiss, while the bedrock layer is approximately 35-65 meters above the sea level, of which the upper layer consists primarily of clayey limestone. There is a fault in the bedrock beneath the Nelijärve lakes, called the Jäneda fault, and a buried valley follows approximately the same line. On average, the regolith layer is 10-20 meters thick, reaching almost 50 meters on the ridges of Nelijärve. The layer beneath soil consists primarily either of sand or peat. Rehessaare bog borders Aegviidu in the southwest.

== Demographics ==
Population census
Year	Pop.	±% p.a.
1934	666	—
1950*	889	+1.82%
1959	1,051	+1.88%
1970	1,250	+1.59%
1979	1,311	+0.53%
1989	1,097	−1.77%
2000	952	−1.28%
2011	761	−2.02%
2021	674	−1.21%
*not based on census Source: entsyklopeedia.ee

Historically, the area had been sparsely populated up until the 19th century, when a cattle manor and the railway were built there. When the settlement was given the rights of a summering borough in 1926, it started growing even more rapidly. The population growth lasted approximately until the 1970s, when it started declining at the same rate as it had grown. Kosenõmme village became a part of Aegviidu on 27 December 1976. Previously, the village was part of the Anija Rural Council and had a population of 55. On 21 October 2022, Aegviidu lost approximately 36 inhabitants due to some of the borough's areas being transferred to neighboring Pillapalu and Mustjõe villages. As of 2021, Estonians make up approximately 90% of the population.

== Gallery ==
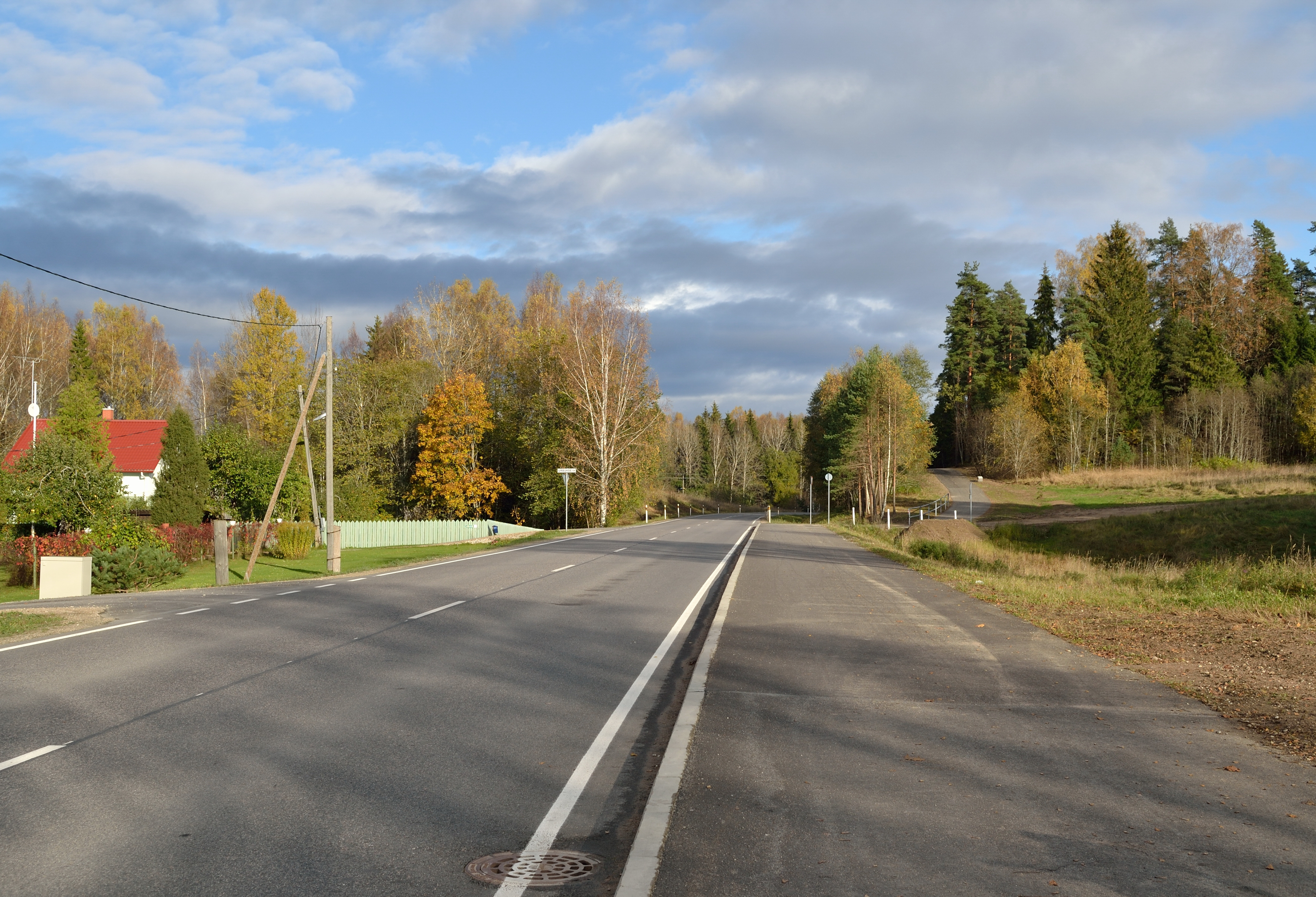
The main road (Piibe road) in Aegviidu

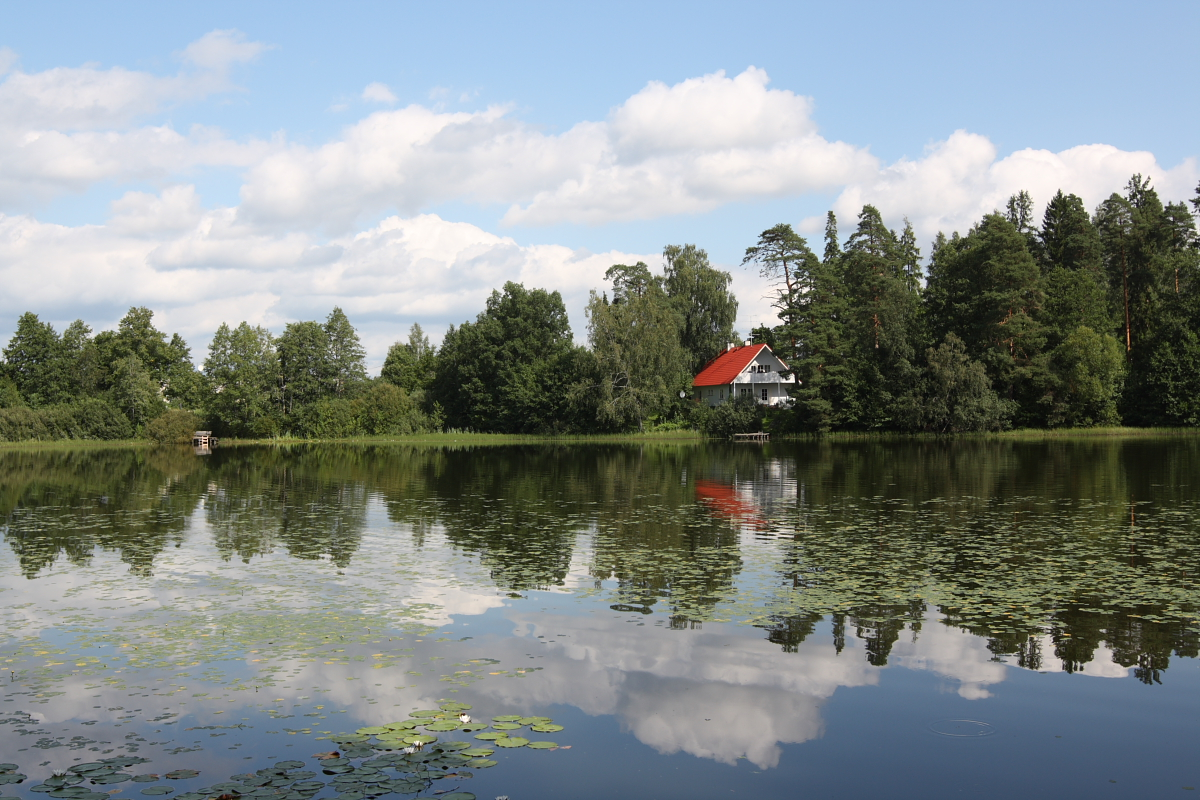
Lake Nikerjärv

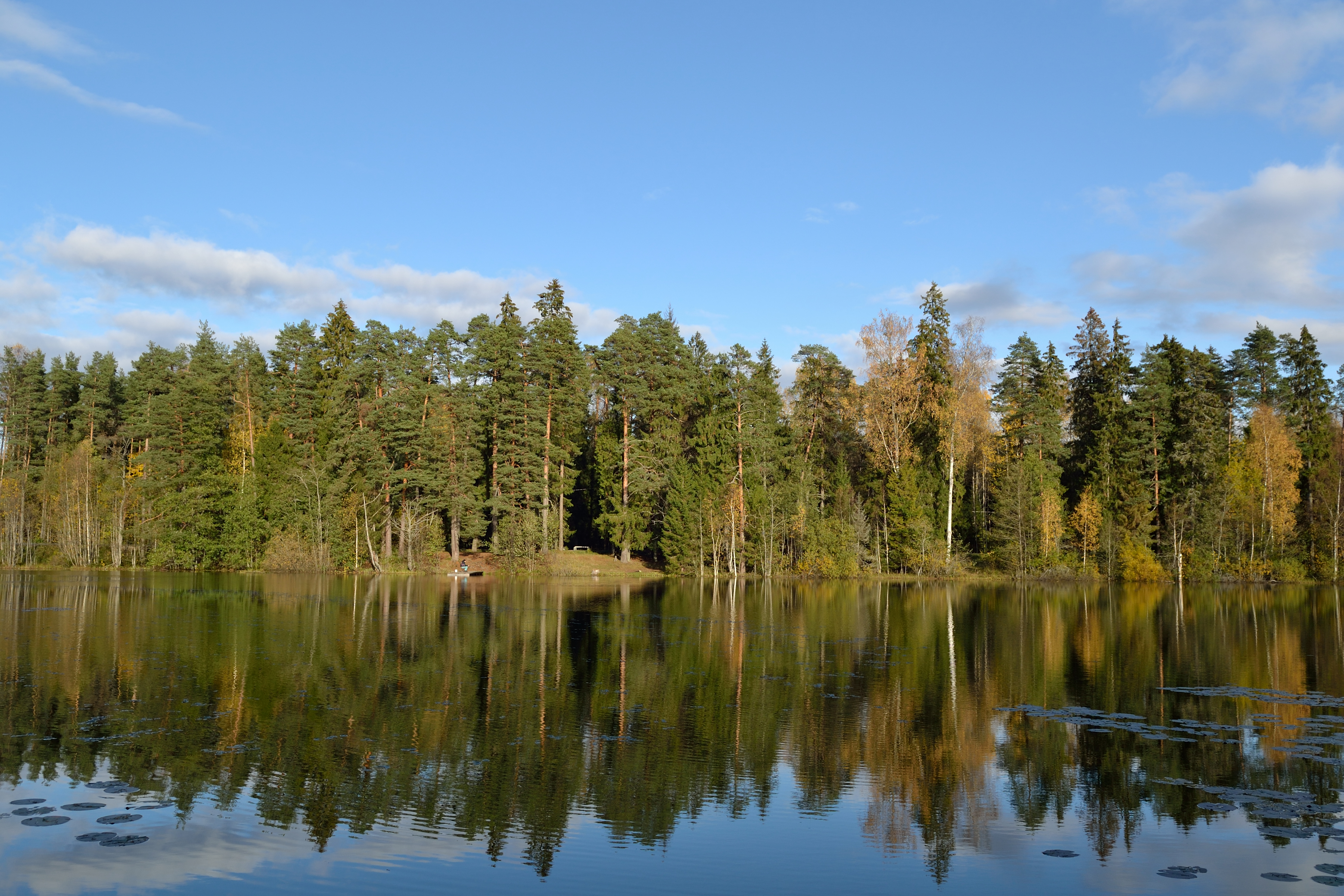
Nelijärve Vahejärv

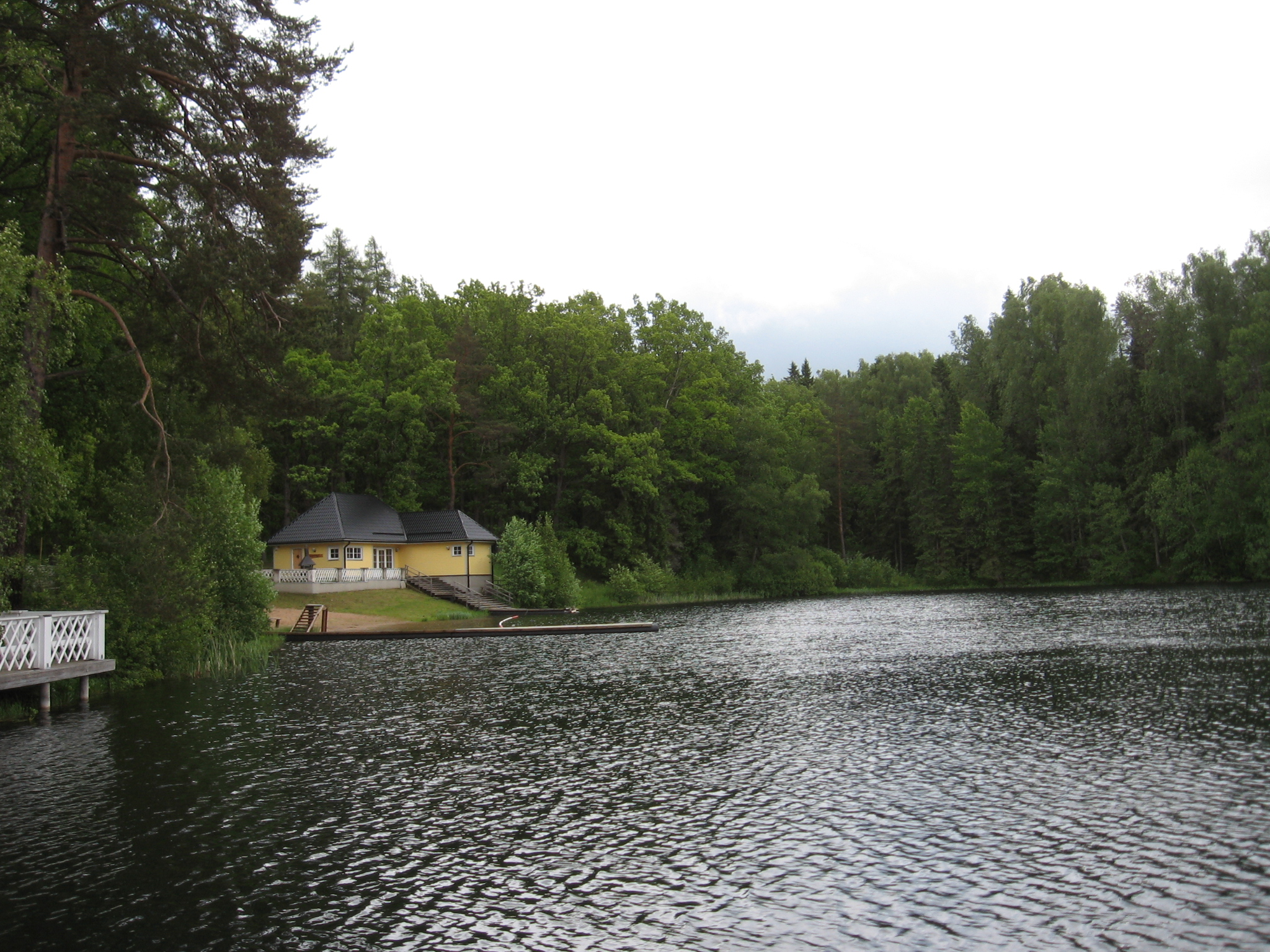
Purgatsi Lake

== Notable people ==
- Jan Kaus (born 1971), writer, was born in Aegviidu.
- Anna Raudkats (1886–1965), dance pedagogue, is buried into Aegviidu cemetery
