= Maapaju Nature Reserve =

Protected area in Estonia

- Location within Estonia
- Location: Estonia
- Nearest city: Aegviidu
- Coordinates: 59°19′17″N 25°30′37″E
- Area: 451 ha (1,110 acres)
- Established: 2005

Maapaju Nature Reserve is a nature reserve which is located in Harju County, Estonia.

The area of the nature reserve is 451 ha.

The protected area was founded in 2005 to protect valuable habitat types and threatened species in Vikipalu and Pillapalu village (Anija Parish).
