= Buried Valley Aquifer System =

The Buried Valley Aquifer System is a buried valley aquifer in the central basin of the Passaic River watershed in New Jersey, as defined by the U.S. Army Corps of Engineers and U.S. Environmental Protection Agency. This region impacts drinking water sources for twenty-six municipalities in four northern New Jersey counties: Morris, Union, Essex, and Somerset.

The borders of this area is defined as:

"on the north by Hook Mountain (a basaltic lava flow) and by a line which roughlybisects the Town of Montville. The western boundary is defined by the trace of the Ramapo Fault and the beginning of the Highlands Physiographic Province. The boundary to the south and the east is formed by the Second Watchung Mountain range, including portions of Union, Essex and Somerset Counties, New Jersey."

This area includes the following municipalities:

- In Essex County: Caldwell, East Orange, Essex Fells, Fairfield, Irvington, Livingston, Maplewood, Millburn, North Caldwell, Roseland, West Caldwell, West Orange
- In Morris County: Chatham (borough), Chatham Township, East Hanover, Florham Park, Hanover, Harding Township, Madison, Montville, Morris Plains, Morristown, Morris Township, Parsippany-Troy Hills, Passaic Township
- In Somerset County: Bernards Township, Warren Township
- In Union County: Berkeley Heights, New Providence, Springfield, Summit
