= Kalijärv =

Lake in Estonia

- Location within Estonia
- Coordinates: 59°14′23.94″N 25°40′52.96″E
- Basin countries: Estonia
- Max. length: 340 meters (1,120 ft)
- Surface area: 4.0 hectares (9.9 acres)
- Average depth: 5.0 meters (16.4 ft)
- Max. depth: 9.0 meters (29.5 ft)
- Water volume: 195,000 cubic meters (6,900,000 cu ft)
- Shore length^{1}: 980 meters (3,220 ft)
- Surface elevation: 72.2 meters (237 ft)
- ^{1} Shore length is not a well-defined measure.

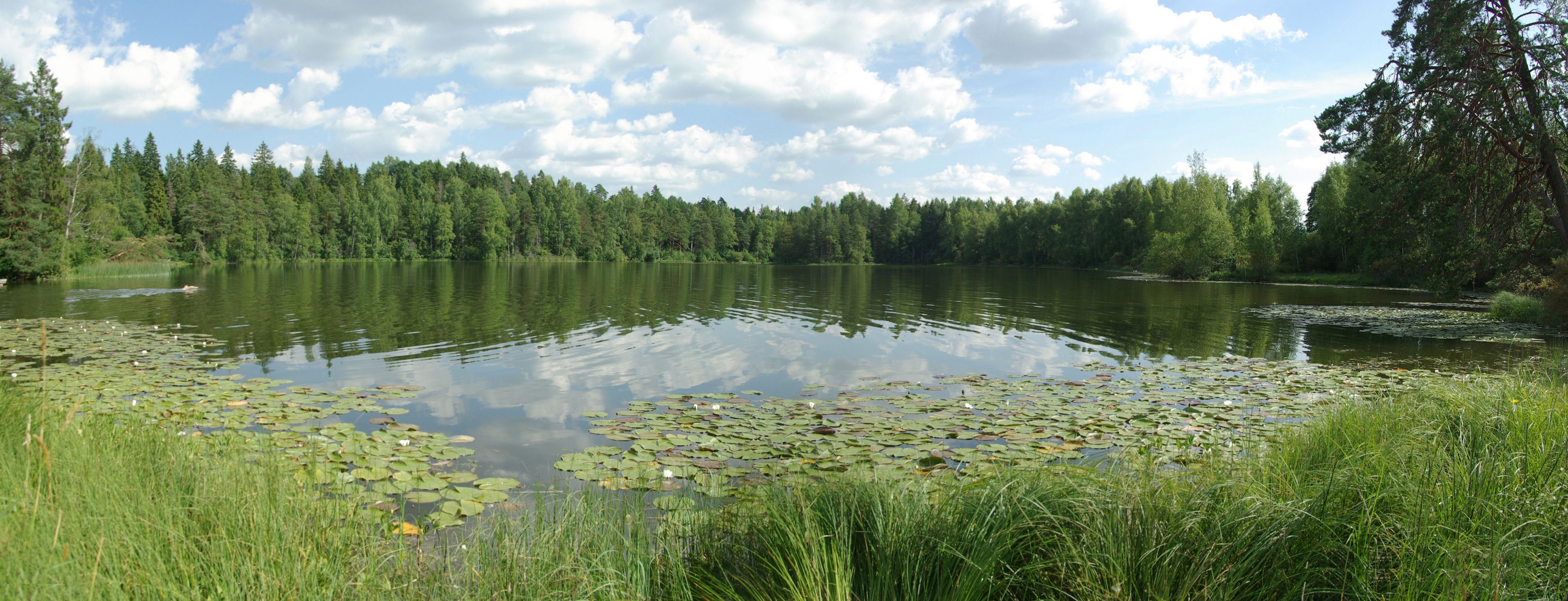
Kalijärv

Kalijärv (also Jäneda Kalijärv) is a lake in Estonia. It is located in the village of Jäneda in Tapa Parish, Lääne-Viru County.

== Physical description ==
The lake has an area of 4.0 hectares (9.9 acres). The lake has an average depth of 5.0 meters (16.4 ft) and a maximum depth of 9.0 meters (29.5 ft). It is 340 meters (1,120 ft) long, and its shoreline measures 980 meters (3,220 ft). It has a volume of 195,000 cubic meters (6,900,000 cu ft).

== See also ==
- List of lakes of Estonia
