= Mustjõe =

Village in Estonia

- Village
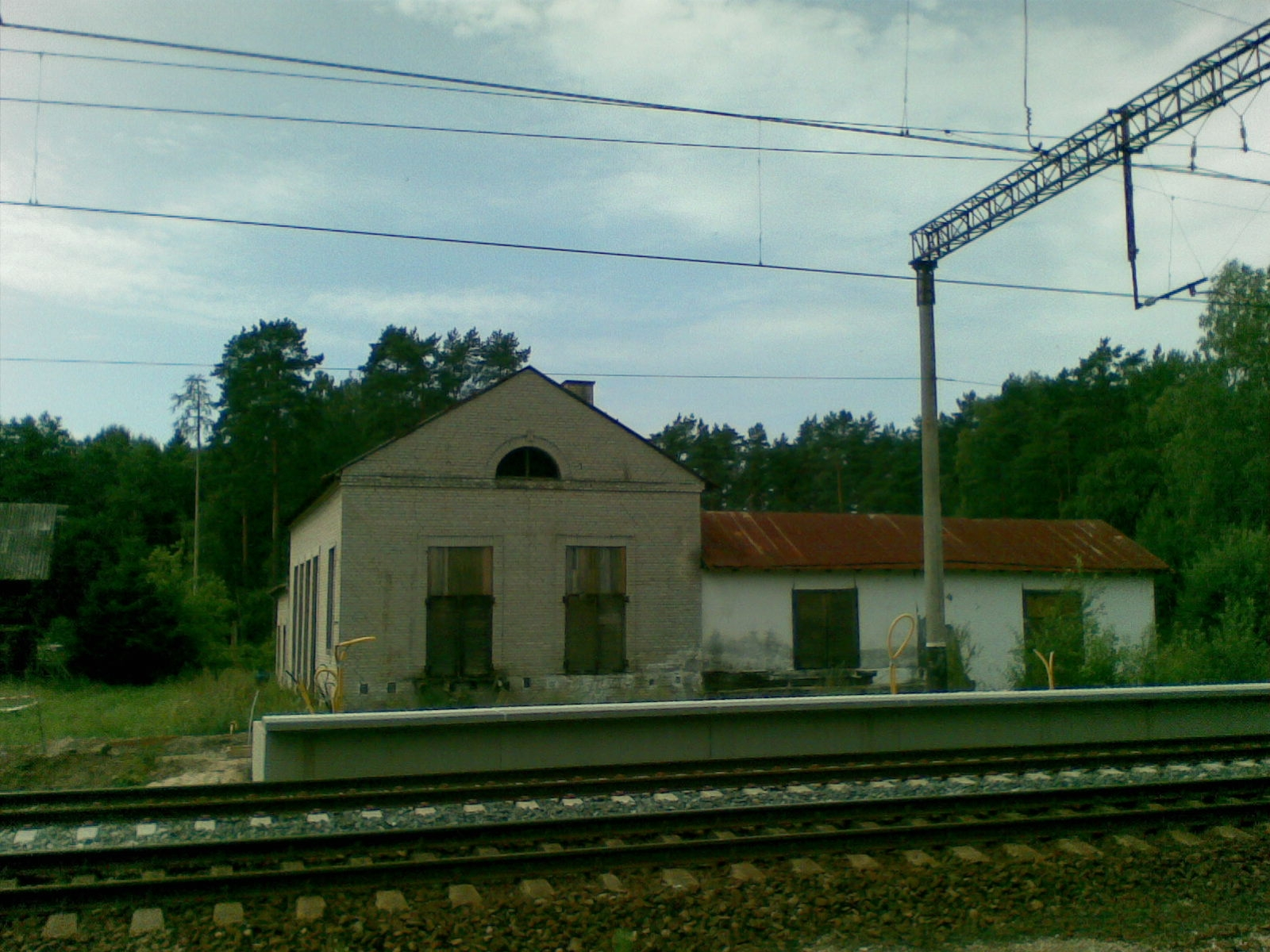
- Mustjõe railway station

- Location in Estonia
- Coordinates: 59°17′48″N 25°27′56″E
- Country: Estonia
- County: Harju County
- Municipality: Anija Parish

Population (01.01.2010)
  - Total: 19

Mustjõe is a village in Anija Parish, Harju County in northern Estonia. It has a population of 19 (as of 1 January 2010). It has a station on the Elron rail line.

Preceding station	Elron	Following station
Lahinguvälja towards Tallinn	Tallinn–Tartu–Valga	Aegviidu towards Valga
Lahinguvälja towards Tallinn	Tallinn–Tartu–Koidula	Aegviidu towards Koidula
Lahinguvälja towards Tallinn	Tallinn–Narva	Aegviidu towards Narva
Lahinguvälja towards Tallinn	Tallinn–Aegviidu	Aegviidu Terminus
