= Jan Kaus =

Estonian writer (born 1971)

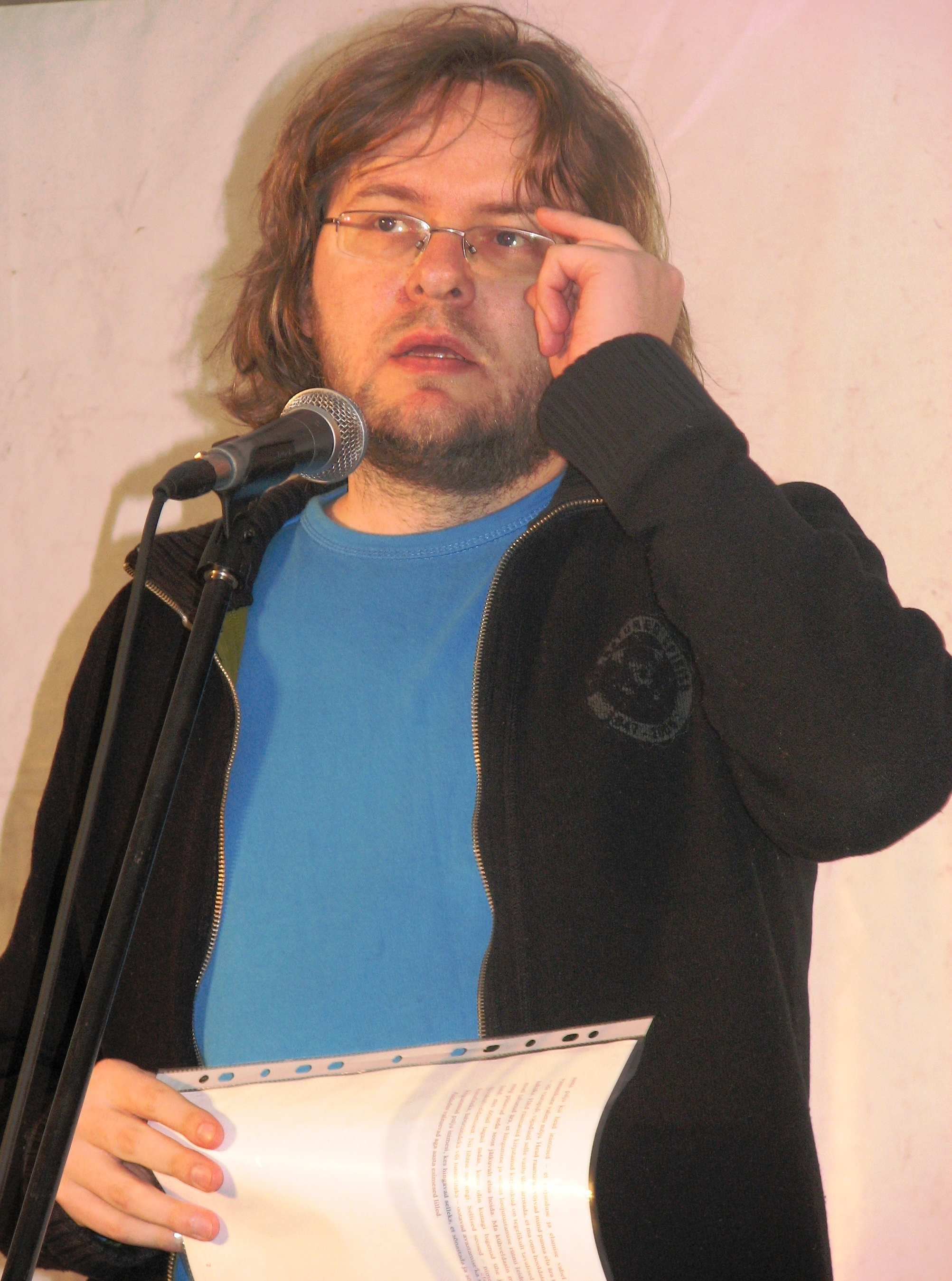
- Kaus in 2010
- Born: 22 January 1971 (age 55); Aegviidu, Estonia
- Occupation: Author
- Writing career
- Notable works: Õndsate tund, Tema, Miniatuurid, Hetk

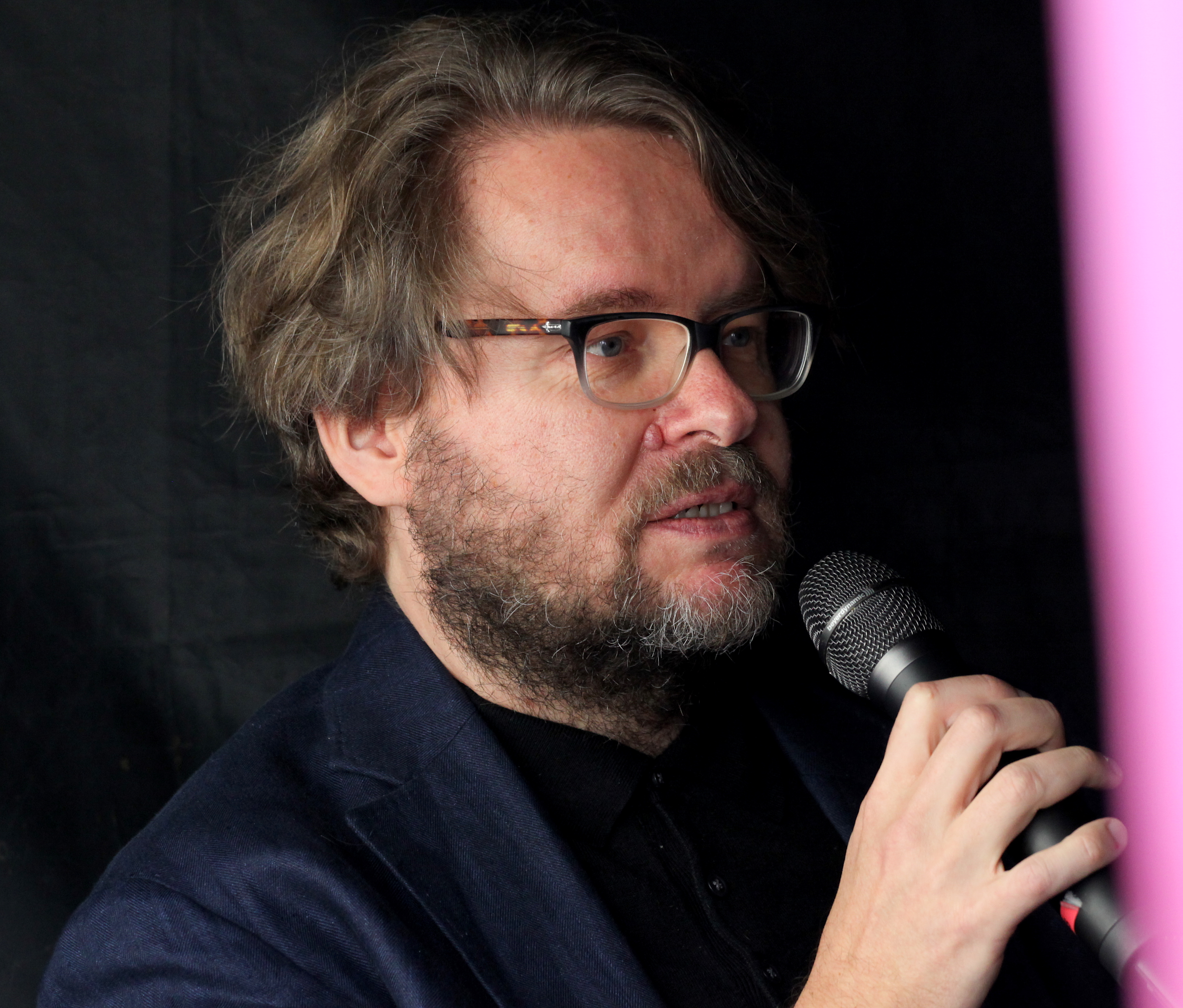
Jan Kaus at the annual Literary Street festival 2021 in Tallinn, Estonia

Jan Kaus (born 22 January 1971) is an Estonian writer.

== Life and work ==
Jan Kaus was born in Aegviidu and studied education and philosophy in Tallinn. In 1995, he took his teacher's examination.

Kaus currently works as poetry and prose writer and publicist. In addition, he also works as a literary critic, essayist, visual artist, guitarist and translator from English and Finnish.

From 1998 to 2001, Kaus was the editor of the Estonian literary weekly Sirp. From 2004 to 2007 he was chairman of the Estonian Writers' Union (Estonian Eesti Kirjanike liit). Since 2007, he has continued to work at Sirp.

Jan Kaus writes shrewd, sometimes sarcastic observations on Estonia, the New Economy and the Internet age. His poetry and prose discuss the social problems in Estonia in the 21st century.

== Works ==
- Üle ja ümber (novellas, 2000)
- Maailm ja mõni (novel, 2001)
- Õndsate tund (novellas, 2003)
- Läbi Minotauruse (collection of essays, 2003)
- Tema (novel, 2005)
- Miniatuurid (short stories, 2009)
- Hetk (novel, 2009)
- Koju (novel)
