= Vikipalu =

Village in Estonia

- Village
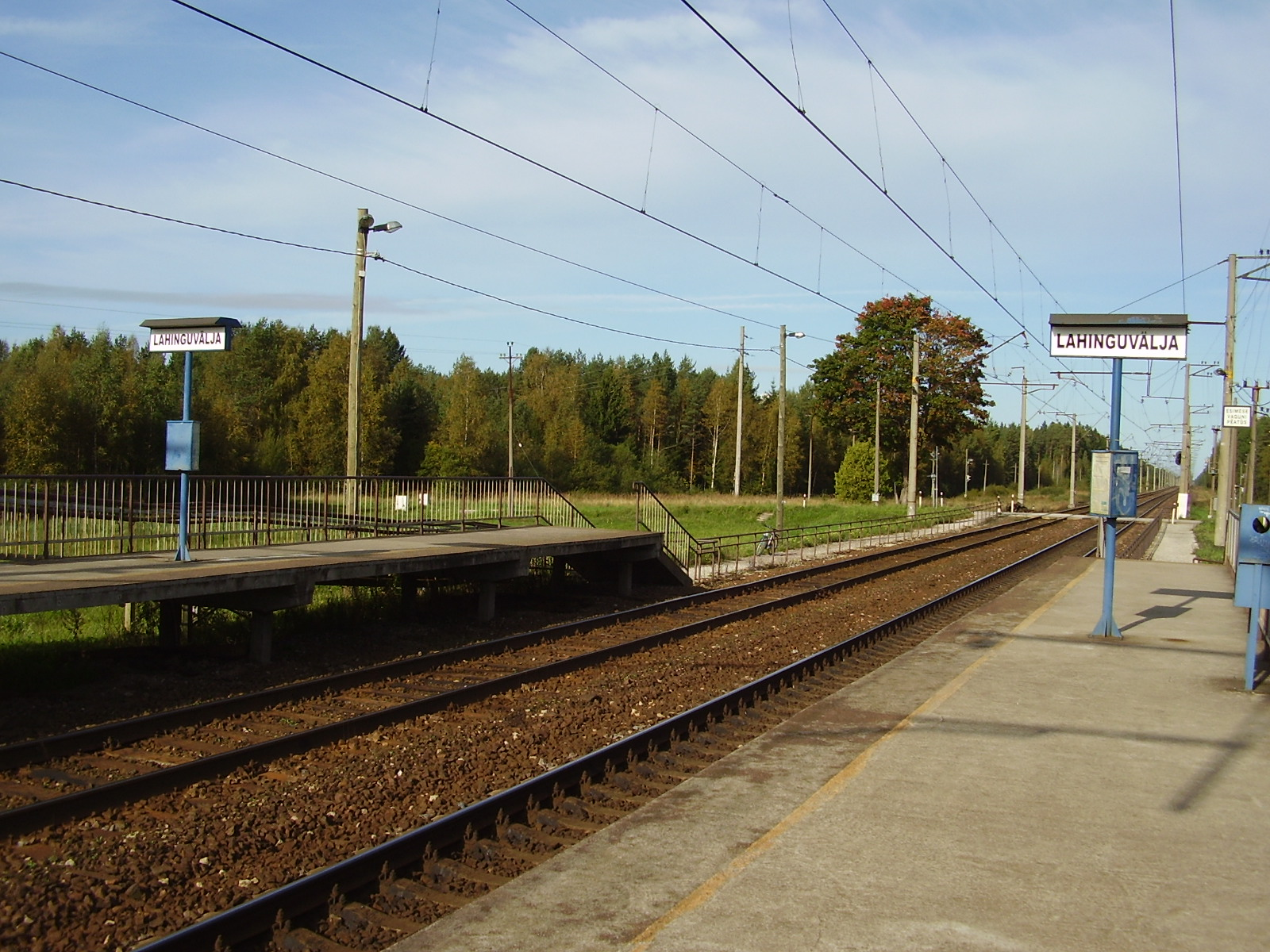
- Lahinguvälja train station in Vikipalu

- Location in Estonia
- Coordinates: 59°21′05″N 25°25′33″E
- Country: Estonia
- County: Harju County
- Municipality: Anija Parish

Population (01.01.2010)
  - Total: 61

Vikipalu is a village in Anija Parish, Harju County in northern Estonia, located about 5 km east of the town of Kehra. It has a population of 61 (as of 1 January 2010).

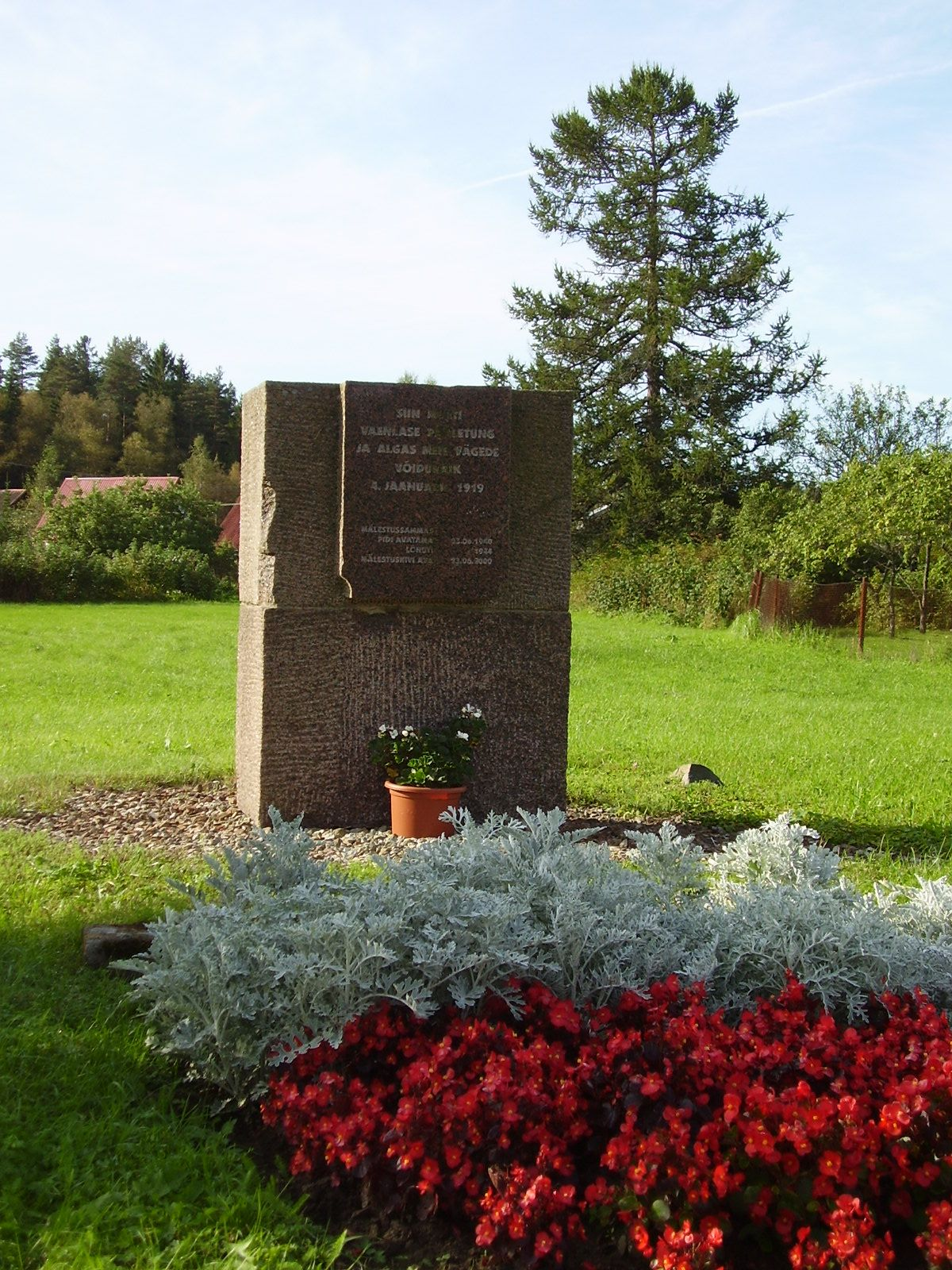
Battle of Kehra memorial at the train station

Most of the village's territory is forested. The Aavoja River flows through the village.

Vikipalu has a station on the Elron western route. It was established in 1939 and named Lahinguvälja (Estonian for 'battlefield') to commemorate the Battle of Kehra (4 January 1919). From 1957 to 2009 it was named Vikipalu. In May 2009 its original name was restored.

Preceding station	Elron	Following station
Kehra towards Tallinn	Tallinn–Tartu–Valga	Mustjõe towards Valga
Kehra towards Tallinn	Tallinn–Tartu–Koidula	Mustjõe towards Koidula
Kehra towards Tallinn	Tallinn–Narva	Mustjõe towards Narva
Kehra towards Tallinn	Tallinn–Aegviidu	Mustjõe towards Aegviidu
