= Kõrvemaa =

Geographical region in Estonia

Coordinates: 59°12′N 25°32′E

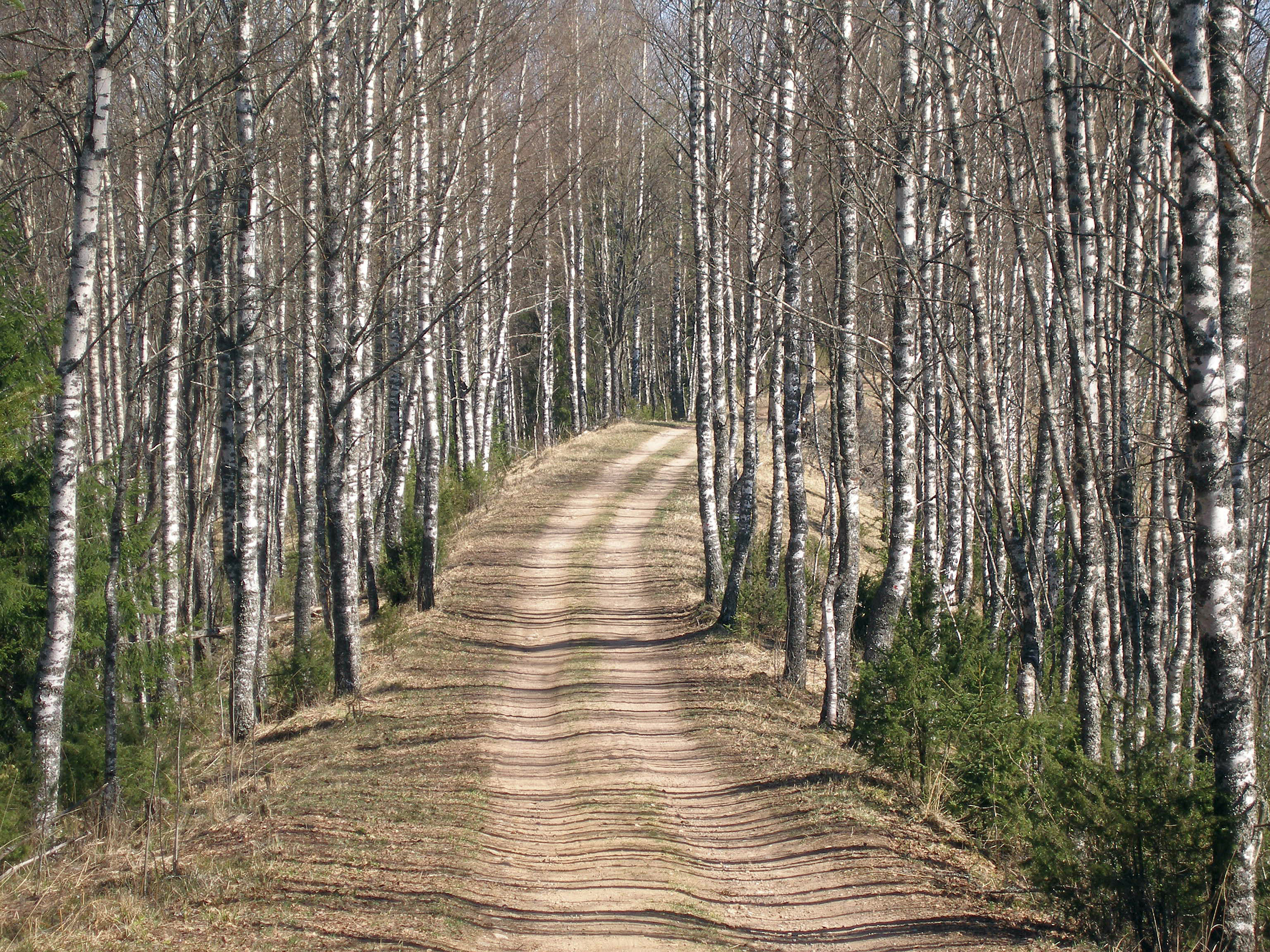
A forest trail running along the top of an esker in Põhja-Kõrvemaa, Estonia.

Kõrvemaa (or Estonian: Vahe-Eesti madalik ('Middle Estonian Lowland')) is a geographical region in Northern Estonia. Its area is 3,132 km^{2} (1,209 sq mi), with length of 110 km (68 mi) and width of 40 km (25 mi).

The region is characterised by wetlands (37.7% of the region) and forests. Settlement is sparse.

A high percent of the region is under protection: there are Põhja-Kõrvemaa and Kõrvemaa Landscape Conservation Area, also part of Lahemaa National Park.
