= Niinsoni Nature Reserve =

Protected area in Estonia

- Location within Estonia
- Location: Estonia
- Nearest city: Aegviidu
- Coordinates: 59°19′45″N 25°33′50″E
- Area: 111 ha (270 acres)
- Established: 2000

Niinsoni Nature Reserve is a nature reserve which is located in Harju County, Estonia.

The area of the nature reserve is 111 ha.

The protected area was founded in 2000 to protect valuable habitat types and threatened species in Anija Parish.
