= Anna Raudkats =

Estonian folk dance reviver

Anna Raudkats (born Johanna Natalie Elisabet Raudkats, 23 February 1886 – 12 April 1965) was an Estonian teacher and folk dance reviver. She wrote several books on Estonian folk dance, occasionally adding elements she had choreographed herself.

== Early life and education ==
Raudkats was born in Külitse village, near Tartu as the oldest child of a railway official and a manager of the dairy at the Piiskopi manor. She attended the Ropka Ministry School and went on to study at the private Alfred Grass Girls' Gymnasium, graduating in 1901. On receiving her diploma as a German language teacher in 1903, she began teaching in Viipuri and later taught in Saint Petersburg. In 1905, she returned to Estonia and attended courses to enable to her teach French. Passing her examination, she was hired in 1906 as the French and German teacher in the Pärnu Progymnasium, where she also taught games and dances, arranging performances for the children.

In 1912, she entered the Gymnastics Institute at Helsinki University, where instructors were trained in physical education. During her schooling, she developed an interest in folk dance and though she initially turned down an offer to work with Oskar Kallas, one of the directors of the Estonian National Museum, in 1913, Raudkats wrote to him and agreed to help him catalogue dances. In 1913, she recorded 19 folk dances for Kallas and the following year, added 26 additional descriptions. In 1915 she graduated from the Gymnastics Institute, becoming one of Estonia's first teachers to receive a higher education in this field.

== Career ==
=== Teaching ===
In 1916, she was hired as a teacher for the Tallinn' Girls Gymnasium. She organized a women's gymnastics program, Kalevi and led the group in developing folk dances. She would work at the Girls' Gymnasium until the start of World War II. Fleeing from Tallinn after the devastating Soviet bombings in March 1944, she moved to the island of Saaremaa. In 1945, she began working at the Kuressaare Secondary School, as a physical education instructor, and organized and instructed folk dance groups. Her first year at the school, her students performed in the School Olympiad held in Tallinn, taking 1st place. In 1946, the school won 3rd prize, which resulted in a library being built for the institution. In 1947, Raudkats simultaneously began teaching physical education courses for the Kuressaare Industrial and Technical School. In 1950, she retired from teaching and began working as the school librarian in Kuressaare until her retirement in 1957.

=== Folk dance collector and choreographer ===
Raudkats was the first to publish a collection of Estonian dance descriptions. In general, there were no books available at that time on folk dances, games, or traditional activities. Her first book, Mängud I (Games I) published in 1924, was followed in 1926 by Eesti rahvatantsud (Estonian Folk Dances), which described 26 traditional folk dances. The following year, she included 41 dances in her publication Valik Põhjamaade rahvatantse (Selection of Nordic Folk Dances). Throughout her career, she published eight books on Estonian folk dance.

In the 1920s she created a popular dance called "Tuljak". Though the "Tuljak" contained traditional elements, she inserted some variations of her own, and originated the "Viru polka" and "Hüppetants" dances. She also documented the dance called "Kaerajaan" or Kaera-Jaan in her Eesti rahvatantsud. For a time, it was considered to be an original Estonian folk dance but was later found to be linked to the quadrille while the Tuljak, danced by courting couples, has Slavonic origins. Raudkats is recognized for creating dances which appear contemporary but are actually based on traditional sources.

Raudkats was Estonian general dance festival's honorary leader in the years 1939, 1955, 1960 and 1963.

== Death and legacy ==
Raudkats died on 12 April 1965 at Tapa Hospital in Tapa, Estonia and was buried in Aegviidu Cemetery, in Aegviidu. In years ending in "0" or "5" the Estonian National Culture Foundation and the Estonian Song and Dance Festival Foundation has awarded, since 1992, the Anna Raudkatsi Folk Dance Scholarship on her birthday to honor the lifetime achievements of a person over 50 years old who has helped promote and preserve the value of folklore and folk dance.
