= Lehtse =

Borough in Estonia

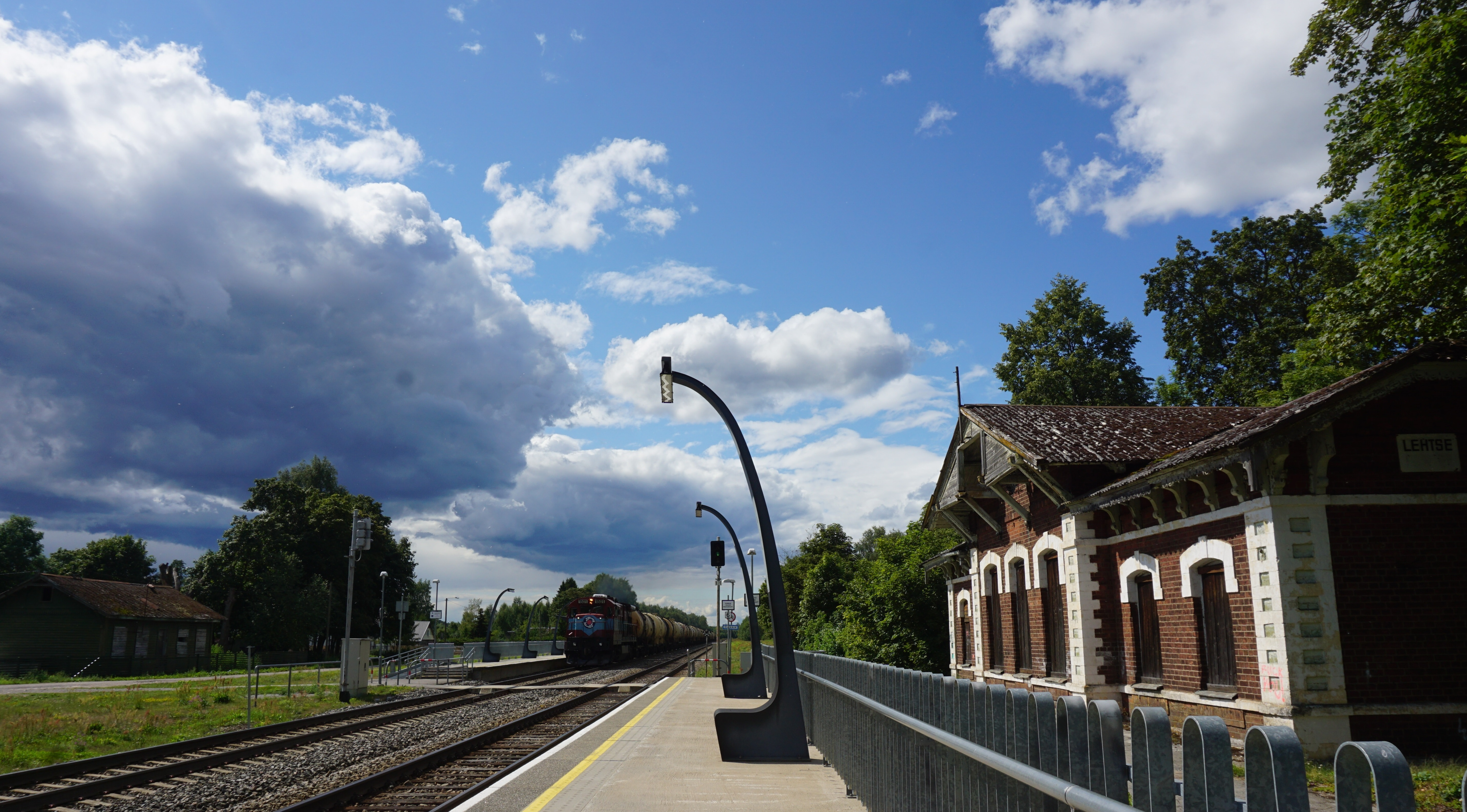
- Lehtse railway station

- Location within Estonia
- Coordinates: 59°14′58″N 25°49′23″E
- Country: Estonia
- County: Lääne-Viru County
- Parish: Tapa Parish

Population (2011 Census)
  - Total: 383
- Time zone: UTC+2 (EET)

Lehtse is a small borough (alevik) in Tapa Parish, Lääne-Viru County in northern Estonia. As of the 2011 census, the settlement's population was 383.

Drone video of Lehtse manor

Preceding station	Elron	Following station
Jäneda towards Tallinn	Tallinn–Tartu–Valga	Tapa towards Valga
Jäneda towards Tallinn	Tallinn–Tartu–Koidula	Tapa towards Koidula
Jäneda towards Tallinn	Tallinn–Narva	Tapa towards Narva
