= Kõrvemaa Landscape Conservation Area =

Protected area in Estonia

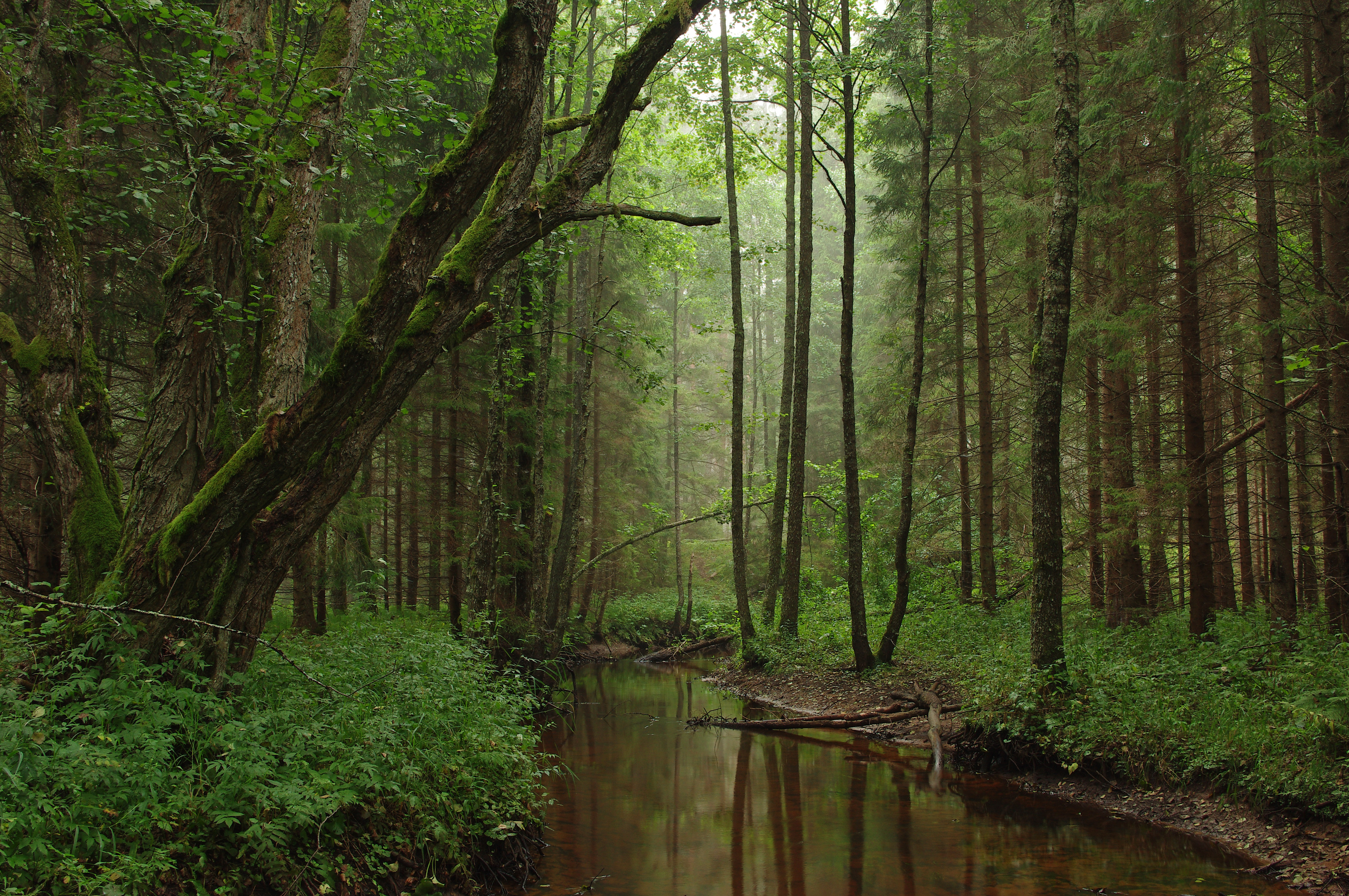

- Location within Estonia
- Location: Estonia
- Coordinates: 59°11′25″N 25°31′18″E
- Area: 20,653 ha (51,030 acres)
- Established: 1959

Kõrvemaa Landscape Conservation Area is a nature park situated in Lääne-Viru County, Estonia.

Its area is 20653 ha.

The protected area was designated in 1959 to protect landscapes and biodiversity of Aegviidu and its surrounding areas.
