= Jäneda =

Village in Estonia

- Village
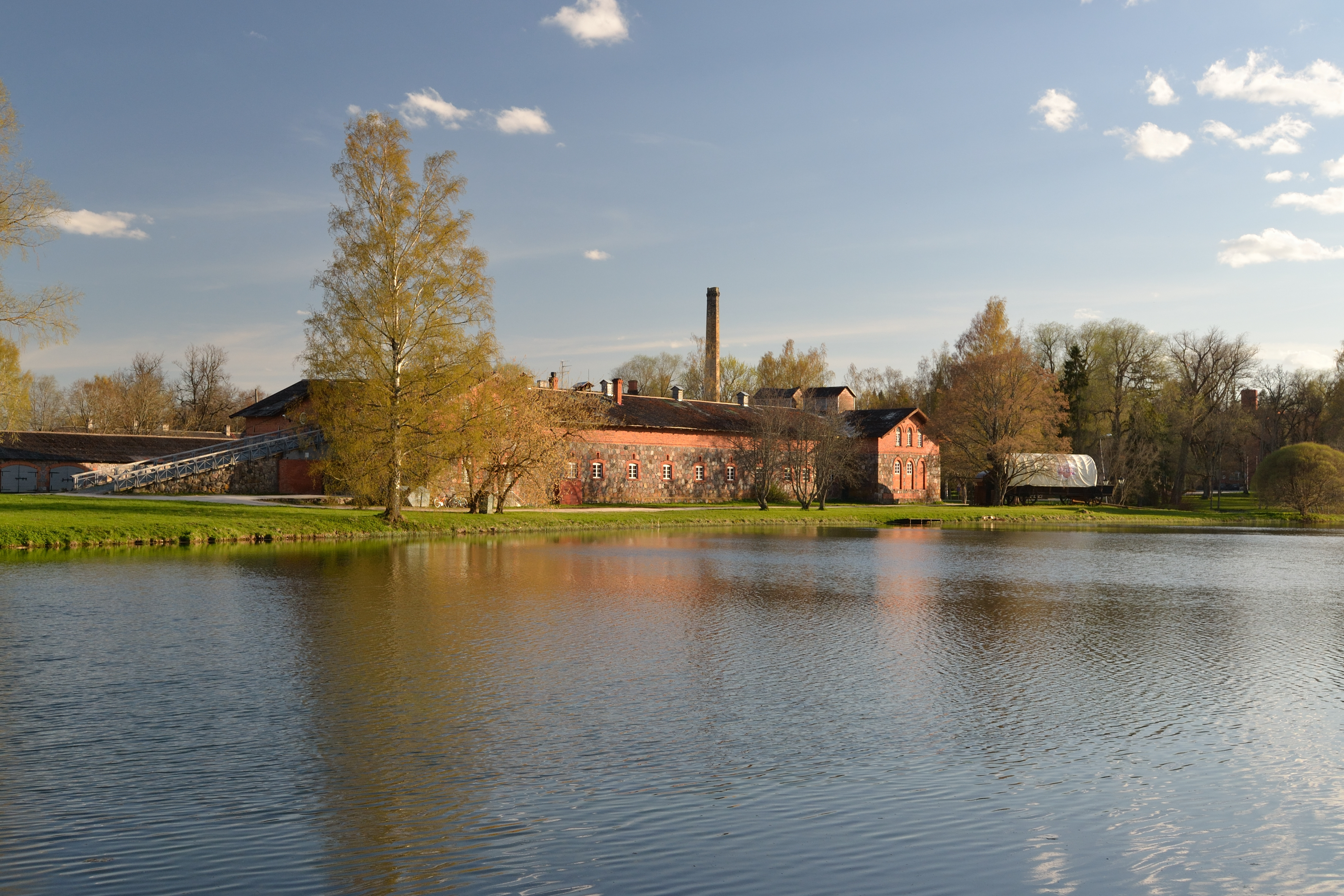
- Jäneda spring lake and manor stable

- Location in Estonia
- Coordinates: 59°14′44″N 25°42′15″E
- Country: Estonia
- County: Lääne-Viru County
- Parish: Tapa Parish
- Time zone: UTC+2 (EET)
  - Summer (DST): UTC+3 (EEST)

Jäneda (German: Jendel) is a small village in northern Estonia. It is located in Lääne-Viru County (since autumn 2005) and is a part of Tapa Parish.

Drone video of Jäneda Manor, July 2021

== History ==
=== Jäneda hill fort ===
Jäneda hill fort was a hill fort used from the 10th to the 12th century. It consisted by a rampart reaching approximately 3 metres (9.8 ft), surrounding a triangular courtyard. There were two towers at the entrance at the southern end and possibly another tower at the northern end. The fort was surrounded by a moat.

=== Jäneda Manor ===
Jäneda Manor was founded as an estate before 1510. The estate has belonged to several different aristocratic families. The present building was built in 1913–1915 in an eclectic Art Nouveau style with strong neo-Gothic influences. In 1922, the interiors were rebuilt based on designs by the architect Anton Lembit Soans. The Estonian composer Urmas Sisask furnished a planetarium at the top of the tower.

In the early 1900s the manor was owned by Countess (later Baroness) Moura (Maria Zakrevskaya Benckendorff) Budberg, who has been called the "Mata Hari of Russia" and who was close to Sir R. H. Bruce Lockhart, the Russian writer Maxim Gorky, and H. G. Wells.

The manor has now been converted into a museum and conference center. The Ugri.info seminar on Finno-Ugric languages and infosystems was held at the manor on either 3 December 2004 or March 12, 2004.

== Gallery ==
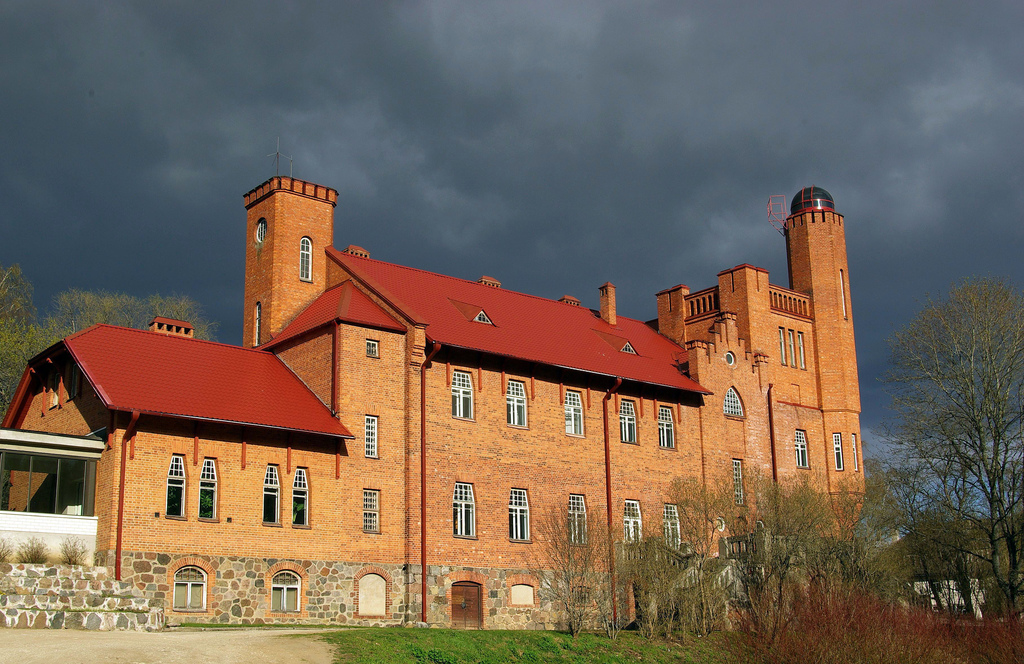
Jäneda Manor

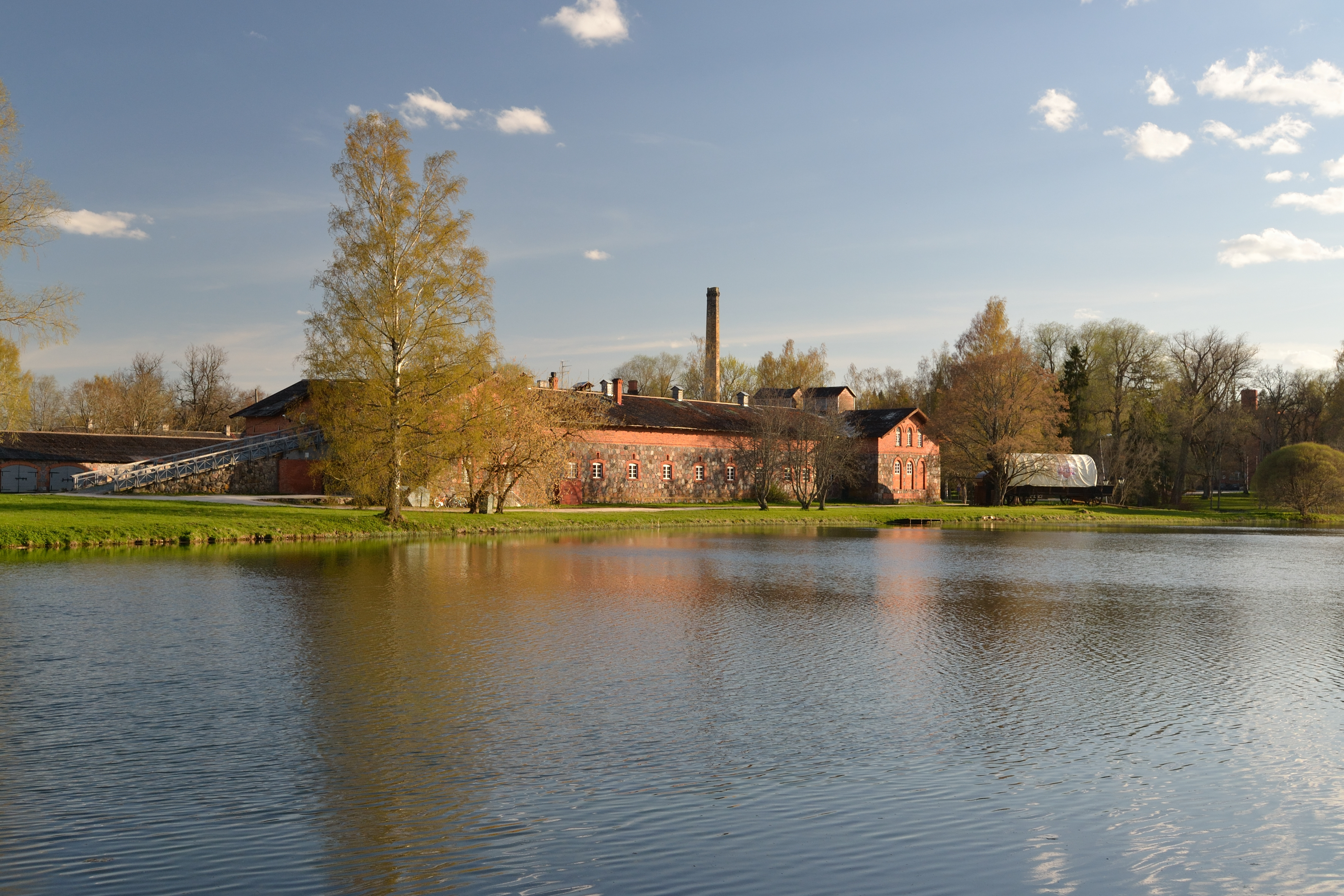
Jäneda spring lake and manor stable

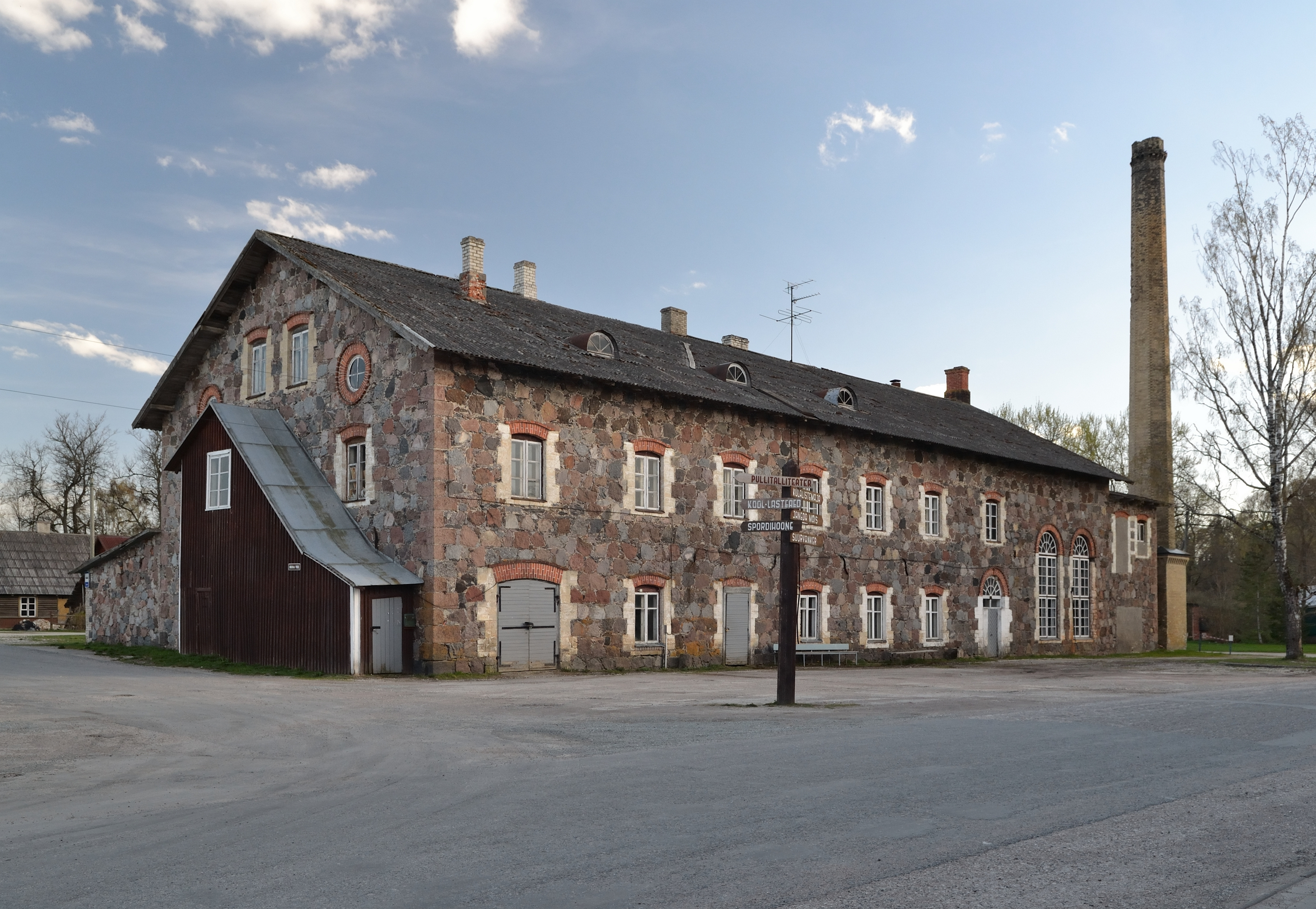
Jäneda manor distillery

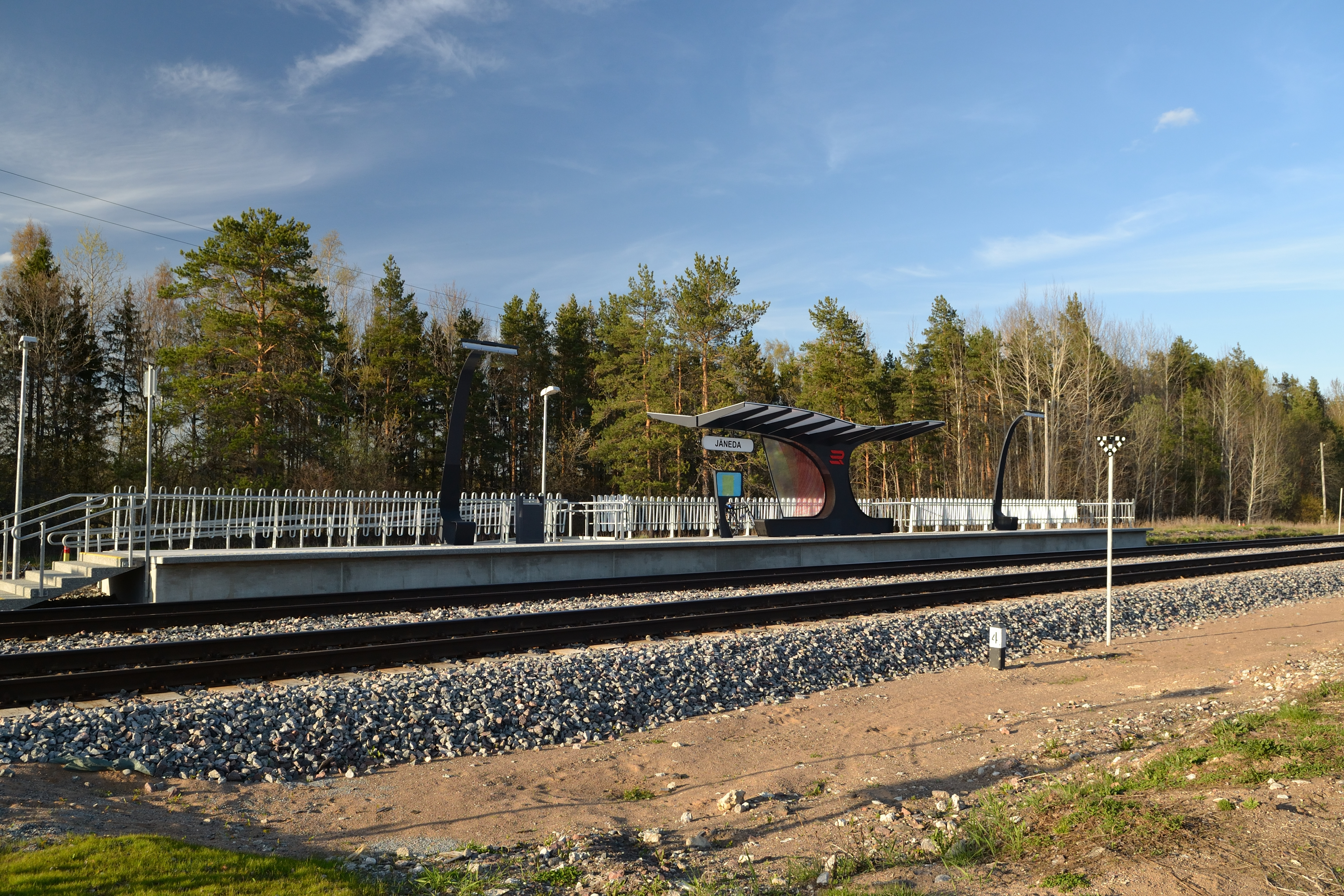
Jäneda railway station

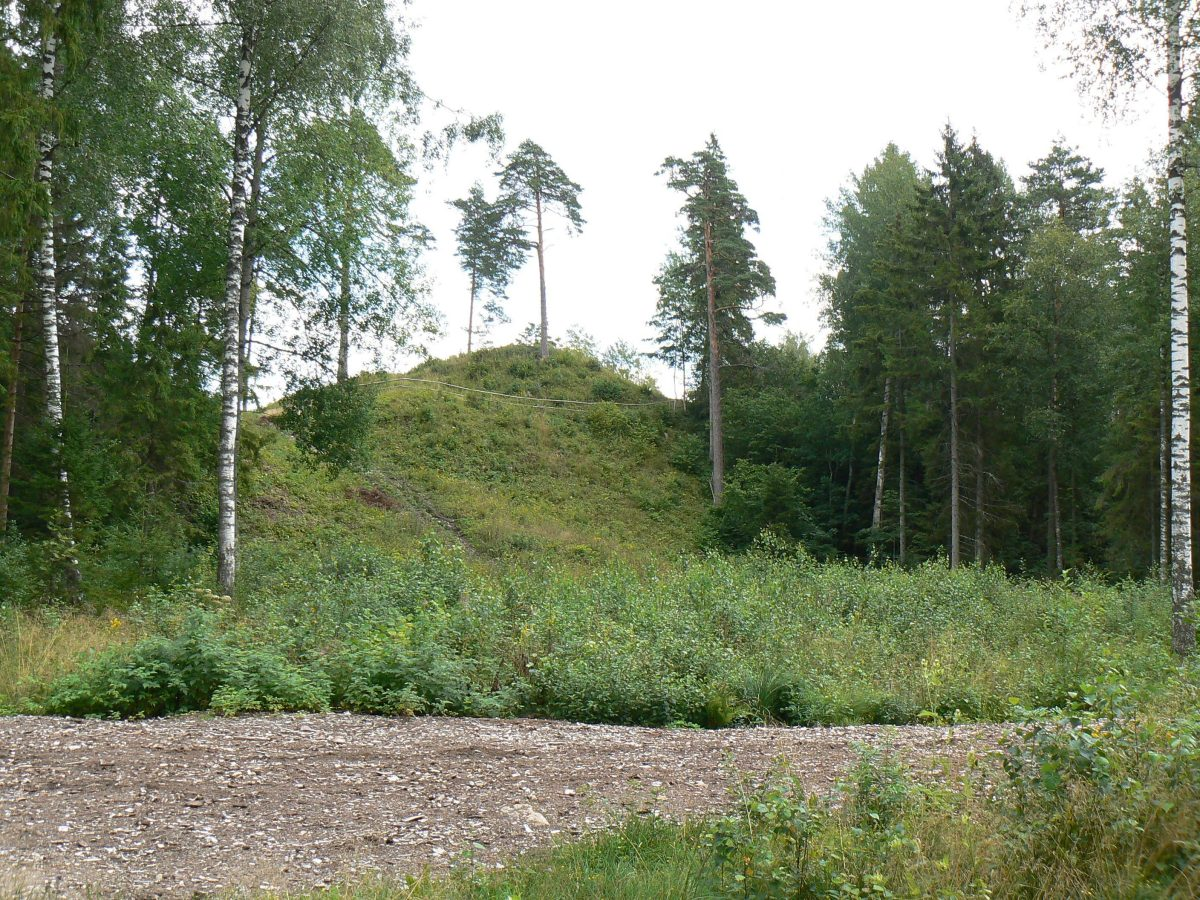
Jäneda hill fort

== See also ==
- List of palaces and manor houses in Estonia

Preceding station	Elron	Following station
Nelijärve towards Tallinn	Tallinn–Tartu–Valga	Lehtse towards Valga
Nelijärve towards Tallinn	Tallinn–Tartu–Koidula	Lehtse towards Koidula
Nelijärve towards Tallinn	Tallinn–Narva	Lehtse towards Narva
