= Buried valley =

A buried valley is an ancient river or stream valley that has been filled with glacial or unconsolidated sediment. This sediment is made up of predominantly gravel and sand, with some silt and clay. These types of sediments can often store and transmit large amounts of groundwater and act as a local aquifer.

Buried valleys may have been created by glacial lake runoff prior to the last major advance and retreat of continental glaciation. These valleys often have no surface expression, but constitute a major source of groundwater in the glaciated mid-continent region of North America and Northern Europe. Recently, research has been focused on understanding the sedimentology of these formations in an effort to determine the safety of continued use of the aquifers which are often found in them.

== Overview ==
Buried valleys are created when ancient river or stream valleys are present that predate the most recent glaciation, and since have been filled with glacial till and/or outwash. In the Pleistocene, advancement and retreat of glaciers carved out the preexisting valleys, and deposited the material that had accumulated in the glacier by the melting of either the glacial outwash or the melting of the ice that composed the glacier itself. Buried valleys are traditionally V- or U-shaped due to the natural shape of valleys, but buried valleys can exhibit different shapes if there were any sort of erosional events after the glacier had finished retreating. The ability to hold groundwater comes from the makeup of the glacial outwash deposits. The glacial outwash deposits of these preexisting valleys mainly consist of coarser materials, such as sand and gravel. Since these materials are coarser, when there is a soil that is almost purely made of these materials, the pore space of the soil increases. This increased pore space creates more voids for water, especially when compared to silt or clay rich soil. After these valleys are formed and filled in, a layer of finer sediment such as silts and clays covers the top of the valley, burying the valley. Buried valleys are best known as being aquifers, and are often used to supply humans with potable water, as well as supply the agriculture and industrial fields with water.

== Mapping buried valleys ==
Buried valleys are difficult to measure and create models for, as they are normally buried deeply beneath the Earth's surface in geologically complex areas. There are several different methods that are used to identify buried valleys, including determining depth to bedrock, the drilling/boring into the Earth's crust to analyze soil makeup, and utilizing existing water wells, although it is said that these methods alone are barely adequate. In order to map the buried valleys, dense data coverage is essential. Typically, the borehole density is relatively small and especially deep boreholes are sparse. It is important that the borehole density is large throughout the area being mapped so that a higher level of accuracy can be attained. Since the buried valleys are carved out by glaciers, topography can be highly variable. The more borings/ cores that are taken, the more accurate the map will be. Based on depth to bedrock reported in water well observations, the electrical conductivity of bedrock appears largely separable from that of the overlying glacial sediments due to the higher conductivity of the shale present in some soils. In one study done in Denmark, a series of braided buried valleys were found anywhere from 10 m to 300 m below the surface using drilling/boring. In order to map the buried valleys, dense data coverage is essential. Although there are no published 3D models of buried models, 2D models have been published many times.

== Buried valleys as aquifers ==
Perhaps what buried valleys are most known for is their ability to become aquifers that store groundwater. The main form of recharge found in buried valley aquifers occurs is the percolation of groundwater through glacial tills and upper intertill aquifers. In fact, many communities in the Midwest get their water from aquifers that were created from these buried valleys, such as Miami, Ohio. In some prairie buried valleys in Canada, the underlying material is made of dense shale, while the covering over the buried valley is made up of such a dense composition Quaternary fill that it vastly limits recharge of the buried valley aquifer, almost to the point of restricting it completely. Recharge is very important, as many different cities all over the world use buried valleys as their main water source. Often, the reason buried valleys are mapped is due to the ability to utilize previously deeply drilled wells that have been supplying water to communities. Since buried valleys were once valleys on the Earth surface, they have a slope or gradient to them. Due to this slope within the valleys, the water will move according to gravity, and produce a flow of water from the higher elevation areas to the lower elevation areas.

== See also ==
- Buried valleys of Tallinn
