= Eesti Laul =

Estonian Eurovision Song Contest preselection

- Logo since 2016
- Location: Estonia
- Years active: 2009–present
- Founders: Eesti Rahvusringhääling (ERR)
- Website: ERR official site

Eesti Laul (transl. Estonian song) is an annual music competition organised by Estonian public broadcaster Eesti Rahvusringhääling (ERR). It determines its entry for the Eurovision Song Contest, and has been staged every year since 2009. Eesti Laul was introduced in 2009, replacing the former Eurolaul festival which had been used since Estonia's first Eurovision participation in 1993. It is one of the most popular television programmes in Estonia; it is also broadcast on radio and the Internet. In 2012, the semi-finals averaged 199,000 viewers, and over an estimated 296,000 viewers watched the final.

== History ==
Logo of the competition until 2015

The contest was introduced by ERR with a new philosophy, and its first producers were Heidy Purga and Mart Normet. Eesti Laul was introduced to produce an Estonian contest, with Estonian musical tastes being presented to a European audience. The contest is also an open one, with all information of the songs being revealed in the selection process.

The festival has produced six top-ten placings for Estonia at the contest. The winner of the Eesti Laul has been chosen by televoting and panels of jurors since its inception. The competition makes a considerable impact on music charts in Estonia and neighbouring countries.

The introduction of semifinals in 2011 raised the potential number of contestants from ten to twenty. The festival is very well known for its alternative rock and electro-pop songs which make the contest more diverse than other Eurovision national finals, so it is sometimes referred to as Alternative Melodifestivalen by the media and the Eurovision fans. In 2016, the grand final was held for the first time at Estonia’s largest concert hall, Saku Suurhall, which also hosted the Eurovision Song Contest in 2002. According to producer Mart Normet, Eesti Laul had grown to become the third-largest national selection for Eurovision in Europe, following Sweden and Norway, with 5,000 people attending the final.

Announced in September 2018, the then new lead producer Tomi Rahula made various changes to the 2019 edition contest including 12 entries in the final, 24 entries overall and broadcasting the semi-finals live from cities outside of Tallinn. Rahula also introduced an entry fee for interested artists and composers; the fee was halved for entrants wishing to perform in the Estonian language.

In July 2023, the broadcaster announced that Rahula would step down from his position and that changes would be made to the format of the next contest.

== Format and rules ==
The twenty selected songs in the contest are shown to the Estonian public through two semi-finals. From each semi-final, five acts get through to the final show. The winner is selected through two rounds of voting: the first round selects top three songs, selected through both jury and televoting; the second round selects the winner from the three songs through 100% televoting.

Most of the rules are dictated by those of the Eurovision Song Contest. However, regulations have been introduced by the Estonian broadcaster. The competition's official rules are released by ERR early in preparation for each year's Eesti Laul, to ensure any changes are noted by songwriters and performers.

There is a limit of six people on stage for each performance. All vocals had to be completely live; human voices are not allowed on backing tracks. Entries usually are not publicly broadcast until the songs are previewed on television. Until 2017, competing songs were only permitted if they were written by all-Estonian team. Since 2017, foreign collaborations were allowed as long as 50% of the song authors were Estonians. Artists and songwriters were allowed to submit up to three songs each with an exception to this rule for songwriters who participated in songwriting camps organised by the Estonian Song Academy.

== Winners ==
The first winner of Eesti Laul was Urban Symphony with the song "Rändajad", beating the televoting favourite Laura in the first round. At Eurovision, the group changed Estonia's fortunes at the contest, qualifying for the final (third in the semi-final, with 115 points), and placing sixth in the final with 129 points.

The most recent winner of the contest was Vanilla Ninja with the song "Too Epic to Be True".

Year	Song	Language	Artist	Songwriter(s)	At Eurovision			
Year	Song	Language	Artist	Songwriter(s)	Final	Points	Semi	Points
2009	"Rändajad"	Estonian	Urban Symphony	Sven Lõhmus	6	129	3	115
2010	"Siren"	English	Malcolm Lincoln	Robin Juhkental	Failed to qualify		14	39
2011	"Rockefeller Street"	English	Getter Jaani	Sven Lõhmus	24	44	9	60
2012	"Kuula"	Estonian	Ott Lepland	Ott Lepland, Aapo Ilves	6	120	4	100
2013	"Et uus saaks alguse"	Estonian	Birgit Õigemeel	Mihkel Mattisen, Silvia Soro	20	19	10	52
2014	"Amazing"	English	Tanja	Timo Vendt, Tatjana Mihhailova	Failed to qualify		12	36
2015	"Goodbye to Yesterday"	English	Elina Born and Stig Rästa	Stig Rästa	7	106	3	105
2016	"Play"	English	Jüri Pootsmann	Fred Krieger, Stig Rästa, Vallo Kikas	Failed to qualify		18	24
2017	"Verona"	English	Koit Toome and Laura	Sven Lõhmus	Failed to qualify		14	85
2018	"La forza"	Italian	Elina Nechayeva	Mihkel Mattisen, Timo Vendt, Ksenia Kuchukova, Elina Nechayeva	8	245	5	201
2019	"Storm"	English	Victor Crone	Stig Rästa, Vallo Kikas, Victor Crone, Fred Krieger, Sebastian Lestapier	20	76	4	198
2020	"What Love Is"	English	Uku Suviste	Uku Suviste, Sharon Vaughn	Contest cancelled due to COVID-19 pandemic			
2021	"The Lucky One"	English	Uku Suviste	Uku Suviste, Sharon Vaughn	Failed to qualify		13	58
2022	"Hope"	English	Stefan	Stefan Airapetjan, Karl-Ander Reismann	13	141	5	209
2023	"Bridges"	English	Alika	Alika Milova, Wouter Hardy, Nina Sampermans	8	168	10	74
2024	"(Nendest) narkootikumidest ei tea me (küll) midagi"	Estonian	5miinust and Puuluup	Kim Wennerström, Kohver, Lancelot, Marko Veisson, Päevakoer, Põhja Korea, Ramo Teder	20	37	6	79
2025	"Espresso macchiato"	Italian, English	Tommy Cash	Tomas Tammemets, Johannes Naukkarinen	3	356	5	113
2026	"Too Epic to Be True"	English	Vanilla Ninja	Sven Lõhmus	Failed to qualify		11	79

== Editions overview ==
Color key

Male artist
Female artist
Band/duo

Year	Premiere	Final	Contestants	Episodes	Winner	Runner-up	Third place
2009	7 March 2009		10	1	Urban Symphony "Rändajad"	Traffic "See päev"	Laura (Note: Did not compete in the superfinal round.) "Destiny"
2010	12 March 2010		10	1	Malcolm Lincoln and Manpower 4 "Siren"	Lenna Kuurmaa "Rapunzel"	Violina feat. Rolf Junior "Maagiline päev"
2011	12 February 2011	26 February 2011	19 (Note: On 15 February 2011, "Jagatud öö" by Uku Suviste was disqualified and not replaced.)	3	Getter Jaani "Rockefeller Street"	Outloudz "I Wanna Meet Bob Dylan"	Orelipoiss "Valss"
2012	18 February 2012	3 March 2012	20	3	Ott Lepland "Kuula"	Lenna Kuurmaa "Mina jään"	Tenfold Rabbit "Oblivion"
2013	16 February 2013	2 March 2013	20	3	Birgit "Et uus saaks alguse"	Grete Paia "Päästke noored hinged"	Winny Puhh "Meiecundimees üks Korsakov läks eile Lätti"
2014	14 February 2014	1 March 2014	20	3	Tanja "Amazing"	Super Hot Cosmos Blues Band "Maybe-Maybe"	Traffic "Für Elise"
2015	7 February 2015	21 February 2015	20	3	Elina Born and Stig Rästa "Goodbye to Yesterday"	Daniel Levi "Burning Lights"	Elisa Kolk "Superlove"
2016	13 February 2016	5 March 2016	20	3	Jüri Pootsmann "Play"	Laura "Supersonic"	Cartoon feat. Kristel Aaslaid "Immortality"
2017	11 February 2017	4 March 2017	20	3	Koit Toome and Laura "Verona"	Kerli "Spirit Animal"	Rasmus Rändvee "This Love"
2018	10 February 2018	3 March 2018	20	3	Elina Nechayeva "La forza"	Stig Rästa "Home"	Vajé "Laura (Walk with Me)"
2019	31 January 2019	16 February 2019	24	3	Victor Crone "Storm"	Uku Suviste "Pretty Little Liar"	Stefan "Without You"
2020	13 February 2020	29 February 2020	24	3	Uku Suviste "What Love Is"	Jaagup Tuisk "Beautiful Lie"	Anett and Fredi "Write About Me"
2021	18 February 2021	6 March 2021	24	3	Uku Suviste "The Lucky One"	Sissi "Time"	Jüri Pootsmann "Magus melanhoolia"
2022	20 November 2021	12 February 2022	40	7	Stefan "Hope"	Minimal Wind feat. Elisabeth Tiffany "What to Make of This"	Elysa "Fire"
2023	12 January 2023	11 February 2023	20	3	Alika "Bridges"	Ollie "Venom"	Bedwetters "Monsters"
2024	20 January 2024	17 February 2024	20	2	5miinust and Puuluup "(Nendest) narkootikumidest ei tea me (küll) midagi"	Ollie "My Friend"	Nele-Liis Vaiksoo "Käte ümber jää"
2025	15 February 2025		16	1	Tommy Cash "Espresso Macchiato"	Andrei Zevakin feat. Karita "Ma ei tea sind"	An-Marlen "Külm"
2026	14 February 2026		12	1	Vanilla Ninja "Too Epic to Be True"	Noëp "Days Like This"	Ollie "Slave"
2027	30 January 2027		12	1			

== Presenters ==
This list includes those who have presented Eesti Laul. In 2009, there were two presenters for the first time. Since the introduction of semi-finals, various people have presented the shows.

Year	Quarter-final presenter(s)	Semi-final presenter(s)	Final presenter(s)
2009	No quarter-finals	No semi-finals	Henry Kõrvits, Robert Kõrvits
2010	No quarter-finals	No semi-finals	Ott Sepp, Märt Avandi
2011	No quarter-finals	Piret Järvis, Lenna Kuurmaa	Piret Järvis, Lenna Kuurmaa, Ott Sepp
2012	No quarter-finals	Piret Järvis	Tiit Sukk, Taavi Teplenkov
2013	No quarter-finals	Anu Välba, Marko Reikop	
2014	No quarter-finals	Helen Sürje, Henrik Kalmet	Marko Reikop, Henrik Kalmet
2015	No quarter-finals	Helen Sürje, Indrek Vaheoja	Marko Reikop, Henrik Kalmet
2016	No quarter-finals	Henry Kõrvits, Maris Kõrvits	Ott Sepp, Märt Avandi
2017	No quarter-finals	Elina Nechayeva, Marko Reikop	Ott Sepp, Märt Avandi
2018	No quarter-finals	Kristel Aaslaid, Martin Veisman	Ott Sepp, Meelis Kubo
2019	No quarter-finals	Piret Krumm, Ott Sepp	Piret Krumm, Karl-Erik Taukar
2020	No quarter-finals	Karl-Erik Taukar, Tõnis Niinemets	
2021	No quarter-finals	Grete Kuld, Tõnis Niinemets	
2022	Tanel Padar and Eda-Ines Etti, Uku Suviste and Tanja, Ott Lepland and Laura, Jüri Pootsmann and Getter Jaani	Maarja-Liis Ilus, Priit Log	Priit Loog and Maarja-Liis Ilus
2023	No quarter-finals	Grete Kuld, Tõnis Niinemets	
2024	No quarter-finals	Grete Kuld, Tõnis Niinemets	
2025	No quarter-finals	No semi-finals	Eda-Ines Etti and Karl Kivastik
2026	No quarter-finals	No semi-finals	Karl Kivastik and Karl-Erik Taukar
2027	No quarter-finals	No semi-finals	Eda-Ines Etti and Koit Toome

== See also ==
- List of historic rock festivals
- Melodi Grand Prix
- Dansk Melodi Grand Prix
- Melodifestivalen
- Estonia in the Eurovision Song Contest
- Eurolaul
