= Estonia in the Eurovision Song Contest 2023 =

- Eurovision Song Contest 2023
- Participating broadcaster: Eesti Rahvusringhääling (ERR)
- Country: Estonia
- Selection process: Eesti Laul 2023
- Selection date: 11 February 2023

Competing entry
- Song: "Bridges"
- Artist: Alika
- Songwriters: Alika Milova; Wouter Hardy; Nina Sampermans

Placement
- Semi-final result: Qualified (10th, 74 points)
- Final result: 8th, 168 points

Participation chronology

Estonia was represented at the Eurovision Song Contest 2023 with the song "Bridges" performed by Alika. The Estonian broadcaster Eesti Rahvusringhääling (ERR) organised the national final Eesti Laul 2023 in order to select the Estonian entry for the 2023 contest. The national final consisted of three shows: two semi-finals and a final. Ten songs competed in each semi-final and six from each semi-final as determined by a jury panel and public vote qualified to the final alongside two wildcards selected by the public. In the final, the winner was selected over two rounds of voting. In the first round, a jury panel and a public vote selected the top three to qualify to the superfinal. In the superfinal, "Bridges" performed by Alika was selected as the winner entirely by a public vote.

Estonia was drawn to compete in the second semi-final of the Eurovision Song Contest which took place on 11 May 2023. Performing during the show in position 4, "Bridges" was announced among the top 10 entries of the second semi-final and therefore qualified to compete in the final on 13 May. It was later revealed that Estonia placed tenth out of the 16 participating countries in the semi-final with 74 points. In the final, Estonia performed in position 12 and placed eighth out of the 26 participating countries, scoring 168 points.

== Background ==
Prior to the 2023 contest, Estonia had participated in the Eurovision Song Contest twenty-seven times since its first entry in 1994, winning the contest in 2001 with the song "Everybody" performed by Tanel Padar, Dave Benton and 2XL. Following the introduction of semi-finals in 2004, Estonia has, to this point, managed to qualify to the final on eight occasions. In 2022, "Hope" performed by Stefan qualified Estonia to the final, where it placed 13th.

The Estonian national broadcaster, Eesti Rahvusringhääling (ERR), broadcasts the event within Estonia and organises the selection process for the nation's entry. ERR confirmed Estonia's participation at the 2023 Eurovision Song Contest on 1 August 2022. Since their debut, the Estonian broadcaster has organised national finals that feature a competition among multiple artists and songs in order to select Estonia's entry for the Eurovision Song Contest. The Eesti Laul competition has been organised since 2009 in order to select Estonia's entry, and on 13 September 2022, ERR announced the organisation of Eesti Laul 2023 in order to select the nation's 2023 entry.

== Before Eurovision ==
=== Eesti Laul 2023 ===
Eesti Laul 2023 was the fifteenth edition of the Estonian national selection Eesti Laul, which selected Estonia's entry for the Eurovision Song Contest 2023. The competition consisted of twenty entries competing in two semi-finals on 12 and 14 January 2023 leading to a twelve-song final on 11 February 2023. All three shows were broadcast on Eesti Televisioon (ETV), on ETV+ with Russian commentary, via radio in Estonia on Raadio 2 with commentary by Kristo Rajasaare, Marta Püssa and Kirke Antsmäe as well as streamed online at the broadcaster's official website err.ee.

==== Format ====
The format of the competition included two semi-finals on 12 and 14 January 2023 and a final on 11 February 2023. Ten songs competed in each semi-final and the top five from each semi-final qualified. The results of the semi-finals were determined by the 50/50 combination of votes from a professional jury and public televoting for the first four qualifiers, and a second round of public televoting for the fifth qualifier. A further round of public televoting was held following the semi-finals which determined two wildcards out of the remaining non-qualifying acts to complete the twelve song lineup in the final. The winning song in the final was selected over two rounds of voting: the first round results selected the top three songs via the 50/50 combination of jury and public voting, while the second round (superfinal) determined the winner solely by public televoting.

==== Competing entries ====
On 13 September 2022, ERR opened the submission period for artists and composers to submit their entries up until 20 October 2022 through an online upload platform. Each artist and songwriter was only able to submit a maximum of five entries. Foreign collaborations were allowed as long as 50% of the songwriters were Estonian. A fee was also imposed on songs being submitted to the competition, with €50 for songs in the Estonian language and €100 for songs in other languages; both of the fees were doubled for entries submitted from 17 October 2022. 217 submissions were received by the deadline, of which 92 were in Estonian. A 16-member jury panel selected 20 semi-finalists from the submissions and the selected songs were announced during the ETV entertainment program Ringvaade on 1 and 2 November 2022. The selection jury consisted of Ahto Kruusmann, Alar Kotkas, Andres Aljaste, Carola Madis, Ingrid Kohtla, Janika Sillamaa, Karl-Erik Taukar, Kristiina Kraus, Lenna, Margus Kamlat, Marta Püssa, Ott Lepland, Robert Linna, Silver Lass, Simon Jay and Vaido Pannel. Wiiralt were originally supposed to perform their entry "Salalik" together with Ultima Thule, but the latter band withdrew after its member Riho Sibul died in November 2022.

Among the competing artists was previous Eurovision Song Contest entrant Robin Juhkental, who represented Estonia in 2010 as part of the group Malcolm Lincoln together with Manpower 4. Andres Kõpper (member of Meelik), Annett x Fredi, Bonzo, Elysa, Inger, Joosep Järvesaar (member of Bedwetters), Karl-Kristjan Kingi (member of Bedwetters), Meelik Samel (member of Meelik), Mia, Sissi and Wiiralt have all competed in previous editions of Eesti Laul. Elysa's entry is written by Stig Rästa, who represented Estonia in 2015, and the entry from M Els is co-written by Stefan Airapetjan, who represented Estonia in 2022. Janek's entry is written by Kjetil Mørland, who represented Norway in 2015.

Artist	Song	Songwriter(s)
Alika	"Bridges"	Alika Milova, Wouter Hardy, Nina Sampermans
Andreas	"Why Do You Love Me"	Andreas Poom, Alan Roy Scott, Julia Sundberg
Anett and Fredi	"You Need to Move On"	Frederik Küüts, Anett Kulbin, Jason Hunter
Bedwetters	"Monsters"	Joosep Järvesaar, Mihkel Mõttus, Rauno Kutti, Kaspar Koppel, Karl-Kristjan Kingi, Claus Peneri, Kris Evan-Säde
Carlos Ukareda	"Whiskey Won't Forget"	Carlos Ukareda, Gevin Niglas, Chris Roberts
Ellip	"Pretty Girl"	Pille-Riin Karro, Meelis Meri
Elysa	"Bad Philosophy"	Stig Rästa, Vallo Kikas, Elisa Kolk, Anne Gudrun Michaelsen, Alex Ghinea
Inger	"Awaiting You"	Inger Fridolin, Oliver de la Rosa Padilla, Sofia-Liis Liiv
Janek	"House of Glass"	Janek Valgepea, Kjetil Mørland
Kaw	"Valik"	Gevin Niglas, Jesse Keihäsvuori
Linalakk and Bonzo	"Aeg"	Liina Tsimmer
M Els	"So Good (At What You Do)"	Stefan Airapetjan, Andreas Poom, Hugo Martin Maasikas, Gevin Niglas, Stig Rästa
Meelik	"Tuju"	Andres Kõpper, Meelik Samel, Rain Parve, Martin Petermann
Merlyn	"Unicorn Vibes"	Merlyn Uusküla, Lauri Lembinen, Liis Kaskpeit
Mia	"Üks samm korraga"	Kersti Kukk
Neon Letters and Maiko	"Tokimeki" (ときめき)	Aap-Eerik Lai, Johanna Holvandus, Maiko Tammik
Ollie	"Venom"	Oliver Mazurtšak
Robin Juhkental	"Kurbuse matused"	Robin Juhkental
Sissi	"Lighthouse"	Sissi Nylia Benita
Wiiralt	"Salalik"	Martin Saaremägi, Vahur Krautman

==== Semi-finals ====
The two semi-finals took place on 12 and 14 January 2023 at the Viimsi Artium in Viimsi, hosted by Tõnis Niinemets and Grete Kuld. In each semi-final ten songs competed for the first four spots in the final with the outcome decided upon by the combination of the votes from a jury panel and a public televote which registered 8,309 votes in the first semi-final and 10,752 votes in the second semi-final; the remaining qualifier was decided by an additional televote between the remaining non-qualifiers which registered 3,987 votes in the first semi-final and 3,257 votes in the second semi-final. In addition to the performances of the competing entries, the band Minimal Wind with Janika Sillama, who almost represented Estonia in the Eurovision Song Contest 1993, the duo Chlicherik and Mäx, and the hosts Tõnis Niinemets and Grete Kuld performed as the interval acts in the first semi-final, while singers Grete Paia with Sven Lõhmus, Kerli Kõiv with Kristjan Järvi, and Yasmyn performed as the interval act in the second semi-final. The jury panel that voted in the semi-finals consisted of Eleryn Tiit, Birgit Sarrap, Grete Paia, Eva Palm, Indrek Vaheoja, Aarne Saluveer, Jaan Tätte Jr., Toomas Olljum, Danel Pandre, Sandra Ashilevi and Jon Mikiver.

First round (jury and televote) qualifier Second round (televote-only) qualifier

Semi-final 1 (First round) – 12 January 2023
R/O	Artist	Song	Jury		Televote		Total	Place
R/O	Artist	Song	Votes	Points	Votes	Points	Total	Place
1	Janek	"House of Glass"	33	3	1,134	7	10	6
2	Ellip	"Pretty Girl"	91	8	502	2	10	7
3	Kaw	"Valik"	42	4	269	1	5	10
4	Merlyn	"Unicorn Vibes"	14	1	529	4	5	9
5	Mia	"Üks samm korraga"	29	2	1,326	8	10	5
6	Neon Letters and Maiko	"Tokimeki"	61	5	520	3	8	8
7	Ollie	"Venom"	115	12	1,397	12	24	1
8	Andreas	"Why Do You Love Me"	81	7	555	5	12	4
9	Bedwetters	"Monsters"	73	6	1,335	10	16	2
10	Anett and Fredi	"You Need to Move On"	99	10	742	6	16	3

Semi-final 1 (Second round) – 12 January 2023
Artist	Song	Televote	Place
Ellip	"Pretty Girl"	971	2
Janek	"House of Glass"	1,535	1
Kaw	"Valik"	265	6
Merlyn	"Unicorn Vibes"	497	3
Mia	"Üks samm korraga"	285	5
Neon Letters and Maiko	"Tokimeki"	434	4

Semi-final 2 (First round) – 14 January 2023
R/O	Artist	Song	Jury		Televote		Total	Place
R/O	Artist	Song	Votes	Points	Votes	Points	Total	Place
1	Inger	"Awaiting You"	58	6	918	8	14	3
2	Linalakk and Bonzo	"Aeg"	30	2	393	2	4	9
3	Meelik	"Tuju"	85	8	775	6	14	4
4	Elysa	"Bad Philosophy"	30	1	1,464	10	11	5
5	Robin Juhkental	"Kurbuse matused"	44	3	317	1	4	10
6	M Els	"So Good (At What You Do)"	50	4	611	5	9	7
7	Wiiralt	"Salalik"	65	7	414	3	10	6
8	Sissi	"Lighthouse"	114	12	890	7	19	2
9	Carlos Ukareda	"Whiskey Won't Forget"	51	5	606	4	9	8
10	Alika	"Bridges"	111	10	4,364	12	22	1

Semi-final 2 (Second round) – 14 January 2023
Artist	Song	Televote	Place
Carlos Ukareda	"Whiskey Won't Forget"	655	3
Elysa	"Bad Philosophy"	731	2
Linalakk and Bonzo	"Aeg"	270	5
M Els	"So Good (At What You Do)"	872	1
Robin Juhkental	"Kurbuse matused"	265	6
Wiiralt	"Salalik"	464	4

==== Wildcard selection ====
A further televote was held between the non-qualifiers in the semi-finals in order to select the two wildcard finalists. Voting took place between 15 and 16 January 2023 and the two qualifiers were announced during the ETV entertainment program Ringvaade on 16 January. The public vote in the wildcard selection registered 7,374 votes.

Wildcard selection – 15–16 January 2023
Artist	Song	Televote	Place
Carlos Ukareda	"Whiskey Won't Forget"	572	6
Ellip	"Pretty Girl"	852	5
Elysa	"Bad Philosophy"	1,419	2
Kaw	"Valik"	267	8
Linalakk and Bonzo	"Aeg"	172	9
Merlyn	"Unicorn Vibes"	1,058	4
Mia	"Üks samm korraga"	1,502	1
Neon Letters and Maiko	"Tokimeki"	338	7
Robin Juhkental	"Kurbuse matused"	130	10
Wiiralt	"Salalik"	1,064	3

==== Final ====
The final took place on 11 February 2023 at the Tondiraba Ice Hall in Tallinn, hosted by Tõnis Niinemets and Grete Kuld. The five entries that qualified from each of the two preceding semi-finals and the two wildcard finalists, all together twelve songs, competed during the show. The winner was selected over two rounds of voting. In the first round, a jury (50%) and public televote (50%) determined the top three entries to proceed to the superfinal. The public vote in the first round registered 32,824 votes. In the superfinal, "Bridges" performed by Alika was selected as the winner entirely by a public televote. The public televote in the superfinal registered 31,412 votes. In addition to the performances of the competing entries, the band Zetod opened the show, while Stefan, who represented Estonia in the Eurovision Song Contest 2022, the group Púr Múdd with Ines, who represented Estonia in the Eurovision Song Contest 2000, the band 2 Quick Start, singer Karl-Erik Taukar and pianist Rein Rannap performed as interval acts. The jury panel that voted in the first round of the final consisted of Alma (Finnish musician), Birgit Simal (Belgian television producer), Kat Reinhert (American vocal teacher, songwriter and Berklee College of Music professor), Lucas Gullbing (Swedish music producer), Deban Aderemi (British journalist at Wiwibloggs), Matthew Tryba (American music producer and songwriter), Anja Roglić (television producer and music editor at the Radio Television of Serbia), Joe Bennett (American musicologist), Tim Hall (American musician and Berklee College of Music professor), Tomi Saarinen (CEO of Live Nation Finland) and Yves Shifferele (Swiss Eurovision Head of Delegation).

Final – 11 February 2023
R/O	Artist	Song	Jury		Televote		Total	Place
R/O	Artist	Song	Votes	Points	Votes	Points	Total	Place
1	Meelik	"Tuju"	61	7	3,048	6	13	4
2	Inger	"Awaiting You"	52	4	1,107	4	8	7
3	Janek	"House of Glass"	56	5	3,051	7	12	5
4	Elysa	"Bad Philosophy"	36	0	694	1	1	11
5	M Els	"So Good (At What You Do)"	40	1	1,046	3	4	9
6	Bedwetters	"Monsters"	67	10	4,685	8	18	3
7	Andreas	"Why Do You Love Me"	51	3	752	2	5	8
8	Alika	"Bridges"	85	12	8,514	12	24	1
9	Anett and Fredi	"You Need to Move On"	41	2	593	0	2	10
10	Ollie	"Venom"	67	8	6,832	10	18	2
11	Mia	"Üks samm korraga"	25	0	372	0	0	12
12	Sissi	"Lighthouse"	57	6	2,130	5	11	6

Detailed Jury Votes
R/O	Song	Alma	B. Simal	K. Reinhert	L. Gullbing	D. Aderemi	M. Tryba	A. Roglić	J. Bennett	T. Hall	T. Saarinen	Y. Shifferele	Total
1	"Tuju"	8	6	5	12			12		6	10	2	61
2	"Awaiting You"	4	7	7	1	2	3	7	7	4	6	4	52
3	"House of Glass"		12	4	10	10	6	4		3		7	56
4	"Bad Philosophy"	3	5	1	2	6	5		10	1	3		36
5	"So Good (At What You Do)"	1	3	2	6	5	1	8	1	8	5		40
6	"Monsters"	6	10	8	7	12		5	8	2	1	8	67
7	"Why Do You Love Me"	5	2		3	4	10		6	12	4	5	51
8	"Bridges"	12	4		4	1	8	10	12	10	12	12	85
9	"You Need to Move On"			12	8		7	1	5	5		3	41
10	"Venom"	7	8	6	5	7	4	6	4	7	7	6	67
11	"Üks samm korraga"	2	1	10		3	2	2	2		2	1	25
12	"Lighthouse"	10		3		8	12	3	3		8	10	57

Superfinal – 11 February 2023
Artist	Song	Televote	Place
Alika	"Bridges"	13,141	1
Bedwetters	"Monsters"	7,991	3
Ollie	"Venom"	10,280	2

=== Promotion ===
Alika made several appearances across Europe to specifically promote "Bridges" as the Estonian Eurovision entry. On 1 April, Alika performed during the Polish Eurovision Party, which was held at the Praga Centrum in Warsaw, Poland and hosted by Poli Genova and Konrad Zemlik. Between 2 and 4 April, Alika took part in promotional activities in Tel Aviv, Israel and performed during the Israel Calling event held at Hangar 11 of the Tel Aviv Port. On 8 April, Alika performed during the PrePartyES event, which was held at the Sala La Riviera venue in Madrid, Spain and hosted by Victor Escudero, SuRie and Ruslana. On 15 April, Alika performed during the Eurovision in Concert event which was held at the AFAS Live venue in Amsterdam, Netherlands and hosted by Cornald Maas and Hila Noorzai. On 16 April, Alika performed the London Eurovision Party, which was held at the Here at Outernet venue in London, United Kingdom and hosted by Nicki French and Paddy O'Connell.

== At Eurovision ==
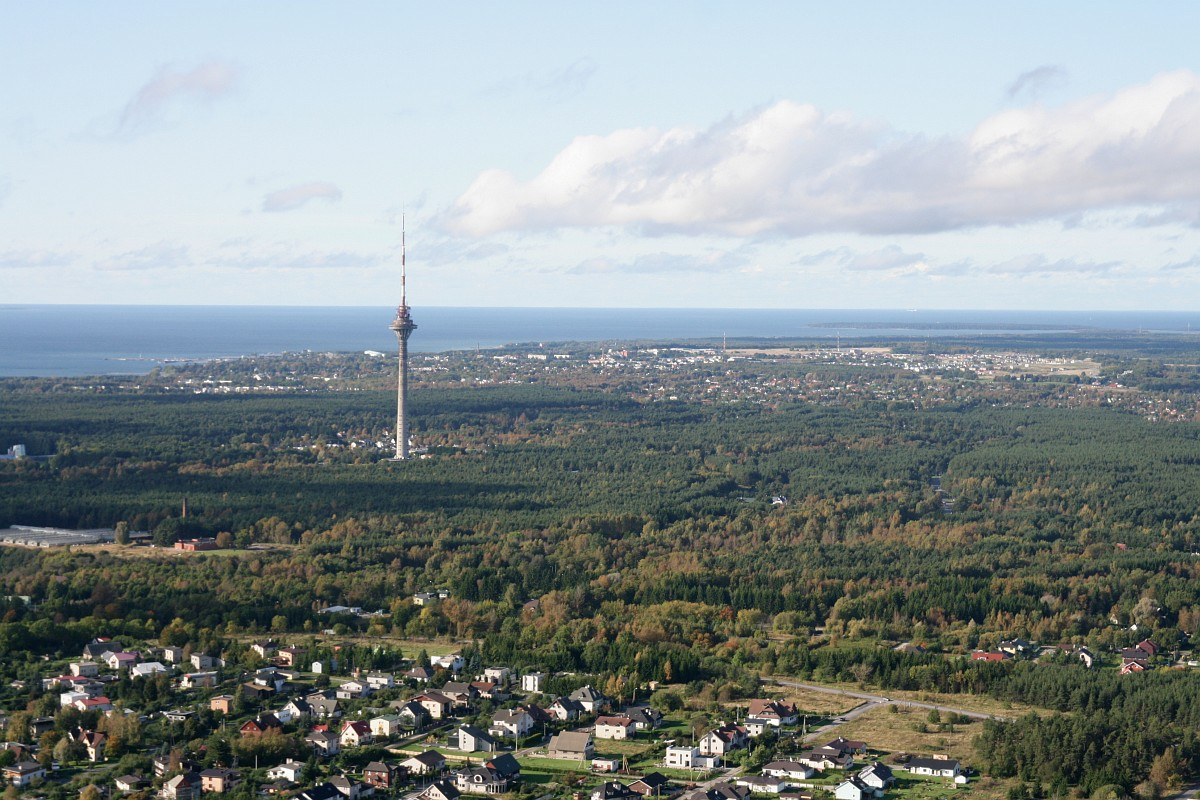
A video postcard introduced Alika's performance in the second semi-final of the Eurovision Song Contest 2023. The postcard was filmed at the Tallinn TV Tower in March 2023 in collaboration with the host broadcaster BBC. The Blackpool Tower in Lancashire and the Vinnytsia water tower were also featured in the Estonian postcard.

According to Eurovision rules, all nations with the exceptions of the host country and the "Big Five" (France, Germany, Italy, Spain and the United Kingdom) are required to qualify from one of two semi-finals in order to compete for the final; the top ten countries from each semi-final progress to the final. The European Broadcasting Union (EBU) split up the competing countries into six different pots based on voting patterns from previous contests, with countries with favourable voting histories put into the same pot. On 31 January 2023, an allocation draw was held, which placed each country into one of the two semi-finals, and determined which half of the show they would perform in. Estonia has been placed into the second semi-final, to be held on 11 May 2023, and has been scheduled to perform in the first half of the show.

Once all the competing songs for the 2023 contest had been released, the running order for the semi-finals was decided by the shows' producers rather than through another draw, so that similar songs were not placed next to each other. Estonia was set to perform in position 4, following the entry from Romania and before the entry from Belgium.

The two semi-finals and the final were broadcast in Estonia on ETV with commentary in Estonian by Marko Reikop and on ETV+ with commentary in Russian by Aleksandr Hobotov and Julia Kalenda. The Estonian spokesperson, who announced the top 12-point score awarded by the Estonian jury during the final, was Ragnar Klavan.

=== Semi-final ===
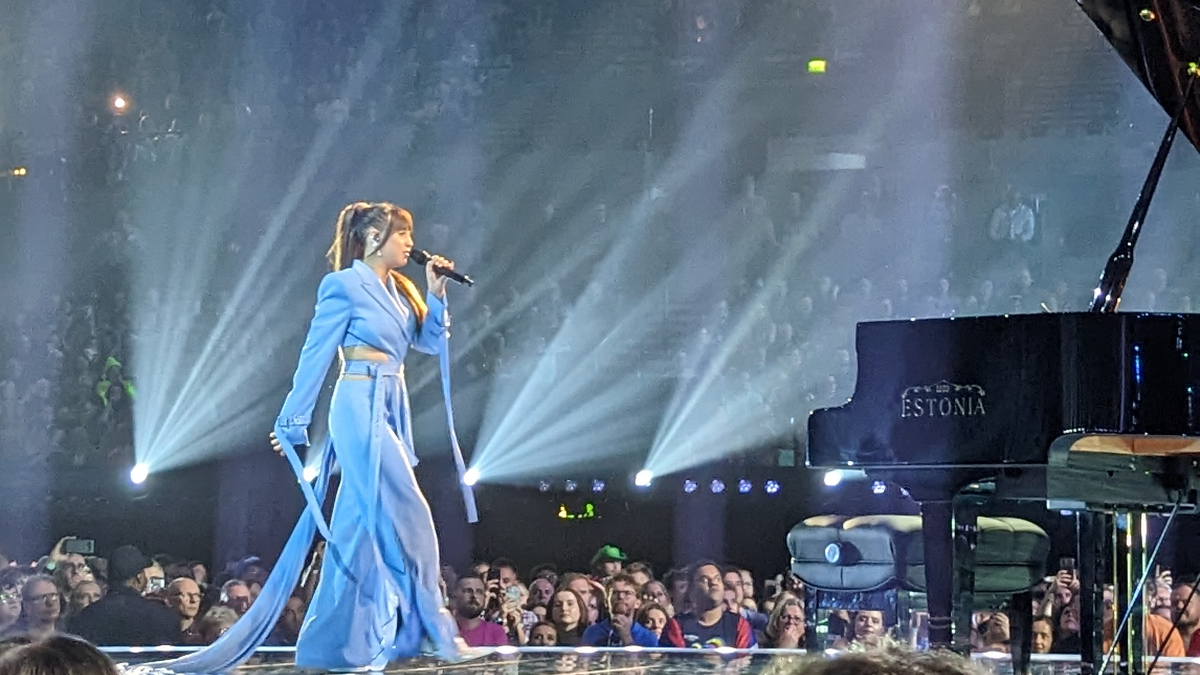
Alika during a rehearsal before the second semi-final

Alika took part in technical rehearsals on 1 and 4 May, followed by dress rehearsals on 10 and 11 May. This included the jury show on 10 May where the professional back-up juries of each country watched and voted in a result used if any issues with public televoting occurred.

The Estonian performance featured Alika performing on stage in a pale blue costume. The performance began with Alika playing the piano before moving to the centre of the stage for the majority of the song. The stage displayed blue and gold colours with graphics of water splashing and a gold rig appearing on the LED screens which later opened up to reveal lights.

At the end of the show, Estonia was announced as having finished in the top 10 and subsequently qualifying for the grand final. It was later revealed that Estonia placed tenth in the semi-final, receiving a total of 74 points.

=== Final ===
Shortly after the first semi-final, a winners' press conference was held for the ten qualifying countries. As part of this press conference, the qualifying artists took part in a draw to determine which half of the grand final they would subsequently participate in. This draw was done in the order the countries appeared in the semi-final running order. Estonia was drawn to compete in the first half. Following this draw, the shows' producers decided upon the running order of the final, as they had done for the semi-finals. Estonia was subsequently placed to perform in position 12, before the entry from Italy and before the entry from Finland.

Estonia once again took part in dress rehearsals on 12 and 13 May before the final, including the jury final where the professional juries cast their final votes before the live show. Alika performed a repeat of her semi-final performance during the final on 14 May. Estonia placed eighth in the final, scoring 168 points: 22 points from the televoting and 146 points from the juries.

=== Voting ===
Voting during the three shows involved each country awarding sets of points from 1–8, 10 and 12: one from their professional jury and the other from televoting in the final vote, while the semi-final vote was based entirely on the vote of the public. Each nation's jury consisted of five music industry professionals who are citizens of the country they represent. This jury judged each entry based on: vocal capacity; the stage performance; the song's composition and originality; and the overall impression by the act. In addition, each member of a national jury may only take part in the panel once every three years, and no jury was permitted to discuss of their vote with other members or be related in any way to any of the competing acts in such a way that they cannot vote impartially and independently. The individual rankings of each jury member in an anonymised form as well as the nation's televoting results were released shortly after the grand final.

Below is a breakdown of points awarded to Estonia and awarded by Estonia in the second semi-final and grand final of the contest, and the breakdown of the jury voting and televoting conducted during the two shows:

==== Points awarded to Estonia ====
Points awarded to Estonia (Semi-final 2)
Score	Televote
12 points	
10 points	Lithuania; San Marino (Note: San Marino uses a jury in the semi-finals.)
8 points	Ukraine
7 points	
6 points	Armenia
5 points	Romania; Slovenia
4 points	Australia
3 points	Austria; Cyprus; Greece; Iceland
2 points	Albania; Belgium; Georgia; Poland; Rest of the World; United Kingdom
1 point	Denmark; Spain

Points awarded to Estonia (Final)
Score	Televote	Jury
12 points		Latvia
10 points		Germany; San Marino; Slovenia; Switzerland
8 points		Albania; Australia; Poland; Portugal; Romania
7 points		Moldova; Spain
6 points	Finland; Latvia	Italy; United Kingdom
5 points	Lithuania; Netherlands	Georgia; Israel; Lithuania; Ukraine
4 points		
3 points		Croatia
2 points		Czech Republic; Sweden
1 point		Azerbaijan

==== Points awarded by Estonia ====
Points awarded by Estonia (Semi-final 2)
Score	Televote
12 points	Australia
10 points	Lithuania
8 points	Poland
7 points	Slovenia
6 points	Austria
5 points	Cyprus
4 points	Belgium
3 points	Armenia
2 points	Iceland
1 point	Georgia

Points awarded by Estonia (Final)
Score	Televote	Jury
12 points	Finland	Sweden
10 points	Sweden	Finland
8 points	Ukraine	Australia
7 points	Norway	Ukraine
6 points	Australia	Belgium
5 points	Lithuania	Italy
4 points	Switzerland	Israel
3 points	Poland	Armenia
2 points	Italy	Spain
1 point	Slovenia	Lithuania

==== Detailed voting results ====
The following members comprised the Estonian jury:

- Bert Järvet
- Gevin Niglas
- Tambet Mumma
- Dagmar Oja
- Liis Lemsalu

Detailed voting results from Estonia (Semi-final 2)
R/O	Country	Televote	
R/O	Country	Rank	Points
01	Denmark	13	
02	Armenia	8	3
03	Romania	15	
04	Estonia		
05	Belgium	7	4
06	Cyprus	6	5
07	Iceland	9	2
08	Greece	12	
09	Poland	3	8
10	Slovenia	4	7
11	Georgia	10	1
12	San Marino	14	
13	Austria	5	6
14	Albania	11	
15	Lithuania	2	10
16	Australia	1	12

Detailed voting results from Estonia (Final)
R/O	Country	Jury							Televote	
R/O	Country	Juror A	Juror B	Juror C	Juror D	Juror E	Rank	Points	Rank	Points
01	Austria	14	11	19	15	11	16		21	
02	Portugal	17	21	14	21	19	24		23	
03	Switzerland	18	20	16	17	7	15		7	4
04	Poland	21	14	13	14	20	22		8	3
05	Serbia	13	7	23	22	24	18		20	
06	France	11	18	18	10	15	17		12	
07	Cyprus	6	19	22	13	10	12		11	
08	Spain	8	17	1	9	18	9	2	24	
09	Sweden	3	2	12	2	3	1	12	2	10
10	Albania	19	24	6	24	23	19		25	
11	Italy	1	6	11	6	12	6	5	9	2
12	Estonia									
13	Finland	4	1	10	1	17	2	10	1	12
14	Czech Republic	16	22	9	18	16	21		13	
15	Australia	5	5	5	11	1	3	8	5	6
16	Belgium	9	4	7	5	2	5	6	18	
17	Armenia	10	8	4	7	6	8	3	19	
18	Moldova	23	13	21	20	14	23		15	
19	Ukraine	2	3	15	3	8	4	7	3	8
20	Norway	20	10	24	8	21	14		4	7
21	Germany	24	23	2	23	22	11		17	
22	Lithuania	12	9	8	16	4	10	1	6	5
23	Israel	7	12	3	4	9	7	4	16	
24	Slovenia	22	15	20	19	5	13		10	1
25	Croatia	25	25	25	25	25	25		14	
26	United Kingdom	15	16	17	12	13	20		22	
