= Estonia in the Eurovision Song Contest 2017 =

- Eurovision Song Contest 2017
- Participating broadcaster: Eesti Rahvusringhääling (ERR)
- Country: Estonia
- Selection process: Eesti Laul 2017
- Selection date: 4 March 2017

Competing entry
- Song: "Verona"
- Artist: Koit Toome and Laura
- Songwriters: Sven Lõhmus

Placement
- Semi-final result: Failed to qualify (14th)

Participation chronology

Estonia was represented at the Eurovision Song Contest 2017 with the song "Verona" written by Sven Lõhmus. The song was performed by Koit Toome, who had previously represented Estonia in the Eurovision Song Contest in 1998 where he placed twelfth with the song "Mere lapsed", and Laura, who had previously represented Estonia in the Eurovision Song Contest in 2005 as part of the group Suntribe where she failed to qualify to the final with the song "Let's Get Loud". The Estonian broadcaster Eesti Rahvusringhääling (ERR) organised the national final Eesti Laul 2017 in order to select the Estonian entry for the 2017 contest in Kyiv, Ukraine. The national final consisted of three shows: two semi-finals and a final. Ten songs competed in each semi-final and five from each semi-final as determined by a jury panel and public vote qualified to the final. In the final, the winner was selected over two rounds of voting. In the first round, a jury panel and a public vote selected the top three to qualify to the super final. In the super final, "Verona" performed by Koit Toome and Laura was selected as the winner entirely by a public vote.

Estonia was drawn to compete in the second semi-final of the Eurovision Song Contest which took place on 11 May 2017. Performing during the show in position 17, "Verona" was not announced among the top 10 entries of the second semi-final and therefore did not qualify to compete in the final. It was later revealed that Estonia placed fourteenth out of the 18 participating countries in the semi-final with 85 points.

== Background ==
Prior to the 2017 contest, Estonia had participated in the Eurovision Song Contest twenty-two times since its first entry in 1994, winning the contest on one occasion in 2001 with the song "Everybody" performed by Tanel Padar, Dave Benton and 2XL. Following the introduction of semi-finals for the 2004 contest, Estonia has, to this point, managed to qualify to the final on five occasions. In 2016, "Play" performed by Jüri Pootsmann failed to qualify Estonia to the final where the song placed eighteenth (last) in the semi-final.

The Estonian national broadcaster, Eesti Rahvusringhääling (ERR), broadcasts the event within Estonia and organises the selection process for the nation's entry. ERR confirmed Estonia's participation at the 2017 Eurovision Song Contest on 12 April 2016. Since their debut, the Estonian broadcaster has organised national finals that feature a competition among multiple artists and songs in order to select Estonia's entry for the Eurovision Song Contest. The Eesti Laul competition has been organised since 2009 in order to select Estonia's entry and on 6 September 2016, ERR announced the organisation of Eesti Laul 2017 in order to select the nation's 2017 entry.

== Before Eurovision ==
=== Eesti Laul 2017 ===
Eesti Laul 2017 was the eighth edition of the Estonian national selection Eesti Laul, which selected Estonia's entry for the Eurovision Song Contest 2017. The competition consisted of twenty entries competing in two semi-finals on 11 and 18 February 2017 leading to a ten-song final on 4 March 2017. All three shows were broadcast on Eesti Televisioon (ETV) and on ETV+ with Russian commentary as well as streamed online at the broadcaster's official website err.ee. The final was also broadcast via radio on Raadio 2 with commentary by Margus Kamlat, Erik Morna, Kristo Rajasaare and Karl-Andreas Kalmet.

==== Format ====
The format of the competition included two semi-finals on 11 and 18 February 2017 and a final on 4 March 2017. Ten songs competed in each semi-final and the top five from each semi-final qualified to complete the ten song lineup in the final. The results of the semi-finals was determined by the 50/50 combination of votes from a professional jury and public televoting for the first four qualifiers and a second round of public televoting for the fifth qualifier. The winning song in the final was selected over two rounds of voting: the first round results selected the top three songs via the 50/50 combination of jury and public voting, while the second round (superfinal) determined the winner solely by public televoting. In addition to winning the right to represent Estonia at the 2017 Eurovision Song Contest, the winning songwriters were also awarded monetary prizes of €3,000. The Estonian Authors' Society and Estonian Performers Association also awarded a monetary prize of €1,000 to the top three entries.

==== Competing entries ====
On 6 September 2016, ERR opened the submission period for artists and composers to submit their entries up until 1 November 2016. All artists and composers were required to have Estonian citizenship or be a permanent resident of Estonia and each artist and songwriter was only able to submit a maximum of three entries with an exception for composers who participated in songwriting camps organised by the Estonian Song Academy in spring and autumn 2016. Foreign collaborations were allowed as long as 50% of the songwriters were Estonian. A record 242 submissions were received by the deadline—breaking the previous record of 238, set during the 2016 edition. An 11-member jury panel selected 20 semi-finalists from the submissions and the selected songs were announced during the ETV entertainment program Ringvaade on 8 November 2016. The selection jury consisted of Andres Puusepp (DJ), Erik Morna (Raadio 2 head of music), Harri Hakanen (Uuden Musiikin Kilpailu music manager), Ingrid Kohtla (music editor), Kaidi Klein (screenwriter), Kristel Aaslaid (musician), Olavi Paide (producer), Owe Petersell (Raadio Elmar chief editor), Piret Järvis (ERR journalist), Siim Nestor (music critic) and Toomas Puna (Raadio Sky+ program director).

Among the competing artists were previous Eurovision Song Contest entrants Ivo Linna, who represented Estonia in 1996 with Maarja-Liis Ilus, Koit Toome, who represented Estonia in 1998, Laura, who represented Estonia in 2005 as part of the group Suntribe, Lenna Kuurmaa, who represented Switzerland in 2005 as member of the band Vanilla Ninja, and Elina Born, who represented Estonia in 2015 with Stig Rästa who also co-wrote her entry. Daniel Levi, Liis Lemsalu and Rasmus Rändvee have all competed in previous editions of Eesti Laul.

Artist	Song	Songwriter(s)
Almost Natural	"Electric"	Anis Arumets, Amiran Gorgazjan, Noah McNamara, Willie Weeks
Alvistar Funk Association	"Make Love, Not War"	Margus Alviste, Inga Kaare, Jürgen Urbanik
Angeelia	"We Ride with Our Flow"	Angeelia Maasik, Andres Kõpper
Antsud	"Vihm"	Aile Alveus-Krautmann
Ariadne	"Feel Me Now"	Margus Piik, Tomi Rahula, Anni Rahula
Carl-Philip	"Everything But You"	Carl-Philip Madis, Carola Madis, Arno Krabman, Jaap Reesema, Leon Paul Palmen, Noah McNamara
Close to Infinity feat. Ian Karell	"Sounds Like Home"	Ian Robert Karell, Johannes Kanter, Sander Ulp, Tanel Kordemets
Daniel Levi	"All I Need"	Daniel Levi Viinalass, Ago Teppand
Elina Born	"In or Out"	Stig Rästa, Vallo Kikas, Fred Krieger
Ivo Linna	"Suur loterii"	Rainer Michelson, Urmas Jaarman
Janno Reim and Kosmos	"Valan pisaraid"	Janno Reim
Karl-Kristjan and Whogaux feat. Maian	"Have You Now"	Karl-Kristjan Kingi, Hugo "Whogaux" Martin Maasikas, Maian Lomp
Kerli	"Spirit Animal"	Kerli Kõiv, Brian Ziff
Koit Toome and Laura	"Verona"	Sven Lõhmus
Laura Prits	"Hey Kiddo"	Laura Prits, Andres Kõpper, Tara Nabi
Leemet Onno	"Hurricane"	Leemet Onno, Ed Struijlaart
Lenna Kuurmaa	"Slingshot"	Lenna Kuurmaa, Nicolas Rebscher, Michelle Leonard
Liis Lemsalu	"Keep Running"	Liis Lemsalu, Mihkel Mattisen, Gustaf Svenungsson, Magnus Wallin
Rasmus Rändvee	"This Love"	Rasmus Rändvee, Ewert Sundja, Bert Prinkenfeld, Stewart James Brock
Uku Suviste	"Supernatural"	Uku Suviste, Oliver Mazurtšak

==== Semi-finals ====
The two semi-finals took place on 11 and 18 February 2017, hosted by Ott Sepp and Märt Avandi. The live portion of the shows were held at the ERR studios in Tallinn where the artists awaited the results while their performances, which were filmed earlier at the ERR studios between 2 and 5 February 2017, were screened. In each semi-final ten songs competed for the first four spots in the final with the outcome decided upon by the combination of the votes from a jury panel and a public televote which registered 19,057 votes in the first semi-final and 19,233 votes in the second semi-final; the fifth qualifier was decided by an additional televote between the remaining non-qualifiers which registered 14,490 votes in the first semi-final and 12,366 votes in the second semi-final. The jury panel that voted in the semi-finals consisted of Metsakutsu, Kadri Voorand, Niko Nykänen, Eva Palm, Jüri Pihel, Maia Vahtramäe, Sten Teppan, Aleksandr Žedeljov, Ingrid Kohtla, Meisterjaan and Allan Roosileht.

First round (jury and televote) qualifier
Second round (televote-only) qualifier

Semi-final 1 (First round) – 11 February 2017
R/O	Artist	Song	Jury		Televote		Total	Place
R/O	Artist	Song	Votes	Points	Votes	Points	Total	Place
1	Elina Born	"In or Out"	85	12	1,780	5	17	3
2	Carl-Philip	"Everything But You"	63	7	726	4	11	6
3	Laura Prits	"Hey Kiddo"	37	1	660	3	4	8
4	Leemet Onno	"Hurricane"	38	2	599	2	4	9
5	Ivo Linna	"Suur loterii"	61	6	4,244	12	18	1
6	Lenna Kuurmaa	"Slingshot"	74	10	1,912	7	17	2
7	Karl-Kristjan and Whogaux feat. Maian	"Have You Now"	74	8	2,509	8	16	4
8	Janno Reim and Kosmos	"Valan pisaraid"	43	3	590	1	4	10
9	Ariadne	"Feel Me Now"	52	5	4,241	10	15	5
10	Uku Suviste	"Supernatural"	45	4	1,796	6	10	7

Semi-final 1 (Second round) – 11 February 2017
Artist	Song	Televote	Place
Ariadne	"Feel Me Now"	8,065	1
Carl-Philip	"Everything But You"	1,089	3
Janno Reim and Kosmos	"Valan pisaraid"	991	4
Laura Prits	"Hey Kiddo"	696	6
Leemet Onno	"Hurricane"	743	5
Uku Suviste	"Supernatural"	2,906	2

Semi-final 2 (First round) – 18 February 2017
R/O	Artist	Song	Jury		Televote		Total	Place
R/O	Artist	Song	Votes	Points	Votes	Points	Total	Place
1	Koit Toome and Laura	"Verona"	63	6	5,226	12	18	2
2	Kerli	"Spirit Animal"	93	12	2,337	8	20	1
3	Daniel Levi	"All I Need"	91	10	1,109	4	14	5
4	Liis Lemsalu	"Keep Running"	83	8	2,246	7	15	4
5	Close to Infinity feat. Ian Karell	"Sounds Like Home"	14	1	940	2	3	9
6	Antsud	"Vihm"	41	4	1,691	6	10	6
7	Almost Natural	"Electric"	24	2	633	1	3	10
8	Rasmus Rändvee	"This Love"	81	7	2,678	10	17	3
9	Alvistar Funk Association	"Make Love, Not War"	30	3	1,074	3	6	8
10	Angeelia	"We Ride with Our Flow"	52	5	1,299	5	10	7

Semi-final 2 (Second round) – 18 February 2017
Artist	Song	Televote	Place
Almost Natural	"Electric"	915	6
Alvistar Funk Association	"Make Love, Not War"	1,305	5
Angeelia	"We Ride with Our Flow"	2,265	2
Antsud	"Vihm"	2,245	3
Close to Infinity feat. Ian Karell	"Sounds Like Home"	1,578	4
Daniel Levi	"All I Need"	4,058	1

==== Final ====
The final took place on 4 March 2017 at the Saku Suurhall in Tallinn, hosted by Ott Sepp and Märt Avandi. The five entries that qualified from each of the two preceding semi-finals, all together ten songs, competed during the show. The winner was selected over two rounds of voting. In the first round, a jury (50%) and public televote (50%) determined the top three entries to proceed to the superfinal. The public vote in the first round registered 100,578 votes. In the superfinal, "Verona" performed by Koit Toome and Laura was selected as the winner entirely by a public televote. The public televote in the superfinal registered 72,518 votes. In addition to the performances of the competing entries, Jüri Pootsmann, who represented Estonia in the Eurovision Song Contest 2016, Swedish singer Måns Zelmerlöw, who won the Eurovision Song Contest 2015, and the band Beyond Beyond performed as the interval acts. The jury panel that voted in the first round of the final consisted of Måns Zelmerlöw (singer), Toomas Edur (ballet dancer), Julia Bali (Raadio 4 chief editor), Harri Hakanen (Uuden Musiikin Kilpailu music manager), Marju Länik (singer), Valner Valme (music critic), Henry Kõrvits (musician), Siim Nestor (music critic), Piret Krumm (actress), Alon Amir (music manager) and Poli Genova (singer).

Final – 4 March 2017
R/O	Artist	Song	Jury		Televote		Total	Place
R/O	Artist	Song	Votes	Points	Votes	Points	Total	Place
1	Liis Lemsalu	"Keep Running"	62	6	4,880	4	10	7
2	Koit Toome and Laura	"Verona"	60	5	27,759	12	17	2
3	Karl-Kristjan and Whogaux feat. Maian	"Have You Now"	71	8	8,362	5	13	4
4	Lenna Kuurmaa	"Slingshot"	62	7	3,422	2	9	8
5	Daniel Levi	"All I Need"	49	2	3,657	3	5	9
6	Elina Born	"In or Out"	45	1	3,057	1	2	10
7	Ivo Linna	"Suur loterii"	57	4	14,002	8	12	5
8	Rasmus Rändvee	"This Love"	77	10	8,617	6	16	3
9	Ariadne	"Feel Me Now"	55	3	12,325	7	10	6
10	Kerli	"Spirit Animal"	100	12	14,497	10	22	1

Detailed Jury Votes
R/O	Song	M. Zelmerlöw	T. Edur	J. Bali	H. Hakanen	M. Länik	V. Valme	H. Kõrvits	S. Nestor	P. Krumm	A. Amir	P. Genova	Total
1	"Keep Running"	6	4	4	8	6	5	3	6	7	5	8	62
2	"Verona"	5	8	12	5	12	3	2	2	2	6	3	60
3	"Have You Now"	10	5	2	2	1	12	8	7	6	8	10	71
4	"Slingshot"	4	2	5	12	10	6	7	1	8	3	4	62
5	"All I Need"	7	1	1	7	3	1	1	10	4	7	7	49
6	"In or Out"	2	3	10	6	4	4	6	3	3	2	2	45
7	"Suur loterii"	1	12	3	3	8	8	4	4	5	4	5	57
8	"This Love"	8	7	7	1	5	2	5	8	10	12	12	77
9	"Feel Me Now"	3	6	6	4	2	7	12	12	1	1	1	55
10	"Spirit Animal"	12	10	8	10	7	10	10	5	12	10	6	100

Superfinal – 4 March 2017
R/O	Artist	Song	Televote	Place
1	Kerli	"Spirit Animal"	23,901	2
2	Rasmus Rändvee	"This Love"	11,641	3
3	Koit Toome and Laura	"Verona"	44,818	1

== At Eurovision ==
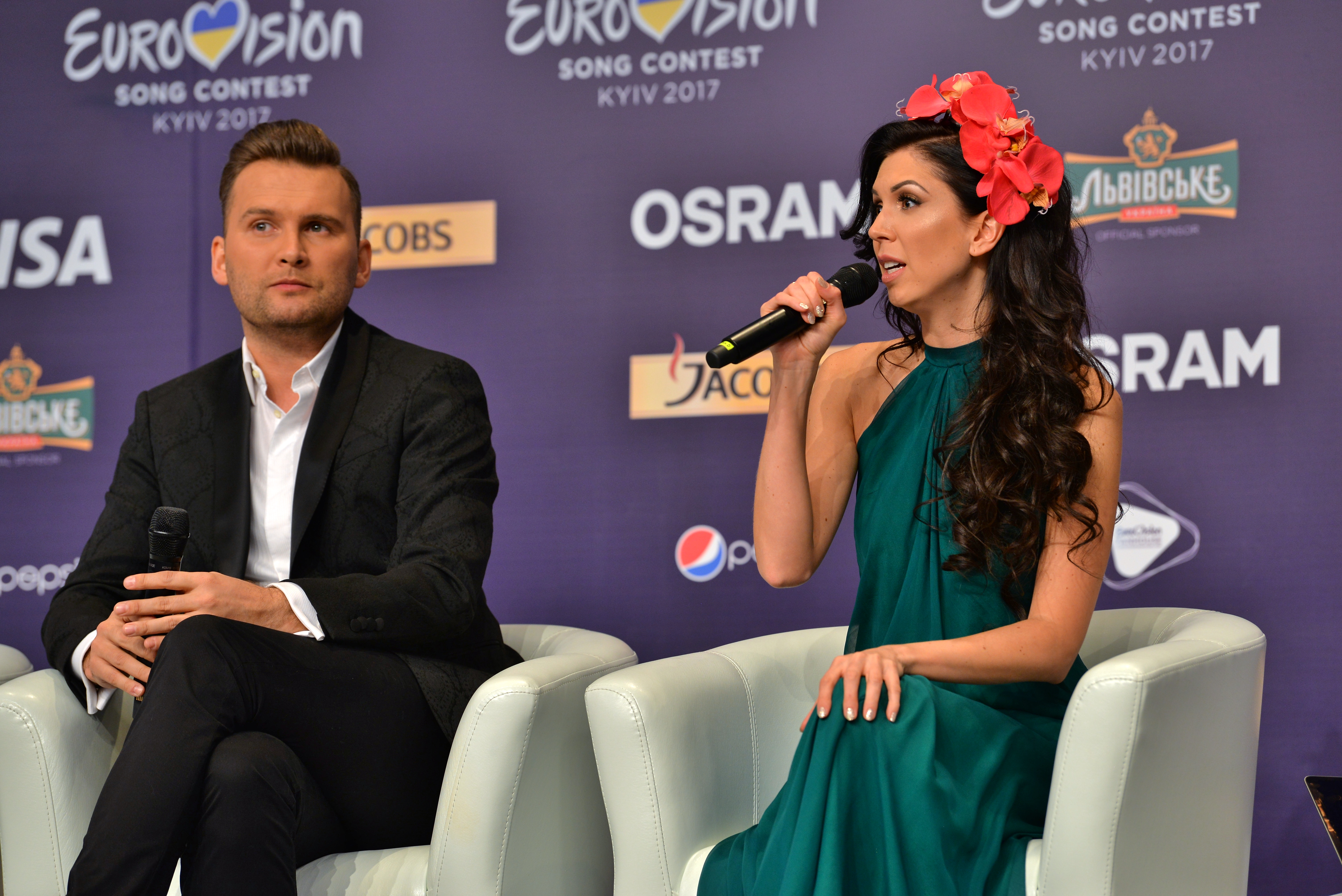
Koit Toome and Laura during a press meet and greet

According to Eurovision rules, all nations with the exceptions of the host country and the "Big Five" (France, Germany, Italy, Spain and the United Kingdom) are required to qualify from one of two semi-finals in order to compete for the final; the top ten countries from each semi-final progress to the final. The European Broadcasting Union (EBU) split up the competing countries into six different pots based on voting patterns from previous contests, with countries with favourable voting histories put into the same pot. On 31 January 2017, an allocation draw was held which placed each country into one of the two semi-finals, as well as which half of the show they would perform in. Estonia was placed into the second semi-final, to be held on 11 May 2017, and was scheduled to perform in the second half of the show.

Once all the competing songs for the 2017 contest had been released, the running order for the semi-finals was decided by the shows' producers rather than through another draw, so that similar songs were not placed next to each other. Estonia was set to perform in position 18, following the entry from Lithuania and before the entry from Israel. However, following Russia's disqualification from the contest on 13 April and subsequent removal from the running order of the second semi-final, Estonia's performing position shifted to 17.

The two semi-finals and the final were broadcast in Estonia on ETV with commentary in Estonian by Marko Reikop and on ETV+ with commentary in Russian by Julia Kalenda and Aleksandr Hobotov. The first semi-final and final were also broadcast via radio on Raadio 2 with Estonian commentary by Mart Juur and Andrus Kivirähk. The Estonian spokesperson, who announced the top 12-point score awarded by the Estonian jury during the final, was Jüri Pootsmann who had previously represented Estonia in the Eurovision Song Contest in 2016.

=== Semi-final ===
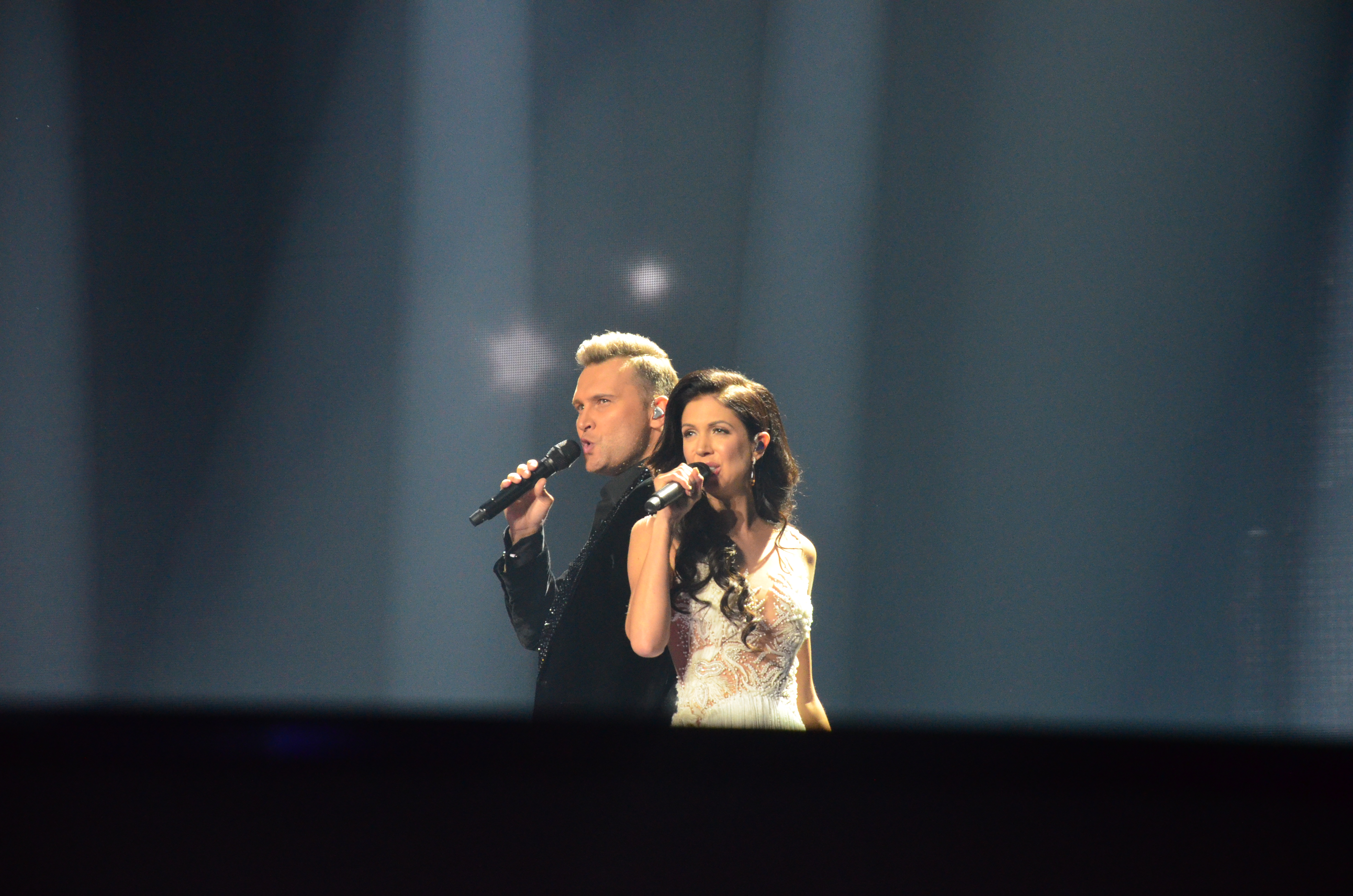
Koit Toome and Laura during a rehearsal before the second semi-final

Koit Toome and Laura took part in technical rehearsals on 3 and 6 May, followed by dress rehearsals on 10 and 11 May. This included the jury show on 10 May where the professional juries of each country watched and voted on the competing entries.

The Estonian performance featured Koit Toome in a black suit with sequin embellishments and Laura in a white dress performing on stage which displayed black and white colours and holograms of Toome and Laura appearing on the LED screens, with a light-up pathway on the LED floor accompanying Toome's entrance to the stage. Koit Toome and Laura were joined by three backing vocalists: Dagmar Oja, Kaire Vilgats and Rolf Roosalu. During the performance, Laura's microphone failed, rendering the first line inaudible to the audience.

At the end of the show, Estonia was not announced among the top 10 entries in the second semi-final and therefore failed to qualify to compete in the final. It was later revealed that Estonia placed 14th in the semi-final, receiving a total of 85 points: 69 points from the televoting and 16 points from the juries.

=== Voting ===
Voting during the three shows involved each country awarding two sets of points from 1–8, 10 and 12: one from their professional jury and the other from televoting. Each nation's jury consisted of five music industry professionals who are citizens of the country they represent, with their names published before the contest to ensure transparency. This jury judged each entry based on: vocal capacity; the stage performance; the song's composition and originality; and the overall impression by the act. In addition, no member of a national jury was permitted to be related in any way to any of the competing acts in such a way that they cannot vote impartially and independently. The individual rankings of each jury member as well as the nation's televoting results were released shortly after the grand final.

Below is a breakdown of points awarded to Estonia and awarded by Estonia in the second semi-final and grand final of the contest, and the breakdown of the jury voting and televoting conducted during the two shows:

==== Points awarded to Estonia ====
Points awarded to Estonia (Semi-final 2)
Score	Televote	Jury
12 points	Lithuania	
10 points		
8 points	Belarus; Ukraine	
7 points		Israel
6 points	France; Israel	
5 points	Norway	
4 points	Hungary; Macedonia	
3 points	Germany; Ireland; Romania	Malta
2 points	Bulgaria; Denmark; Malta	Austria; Macedonia
1 point	Switzerland	Belarus; Denmark

==== Points awarded by Estonia ====
Points awarded by Estonia (Semi-final 2)
Score	Televote	Jury
12 points	Romania	Bulgaria
10 points	Bulgaria	Norway
8 points	Hungary	Denmark
7 points	Ireland	Ireland
6 points	Belarus	Netherlands
5 points	Croatia	Austria
4 points	Israel	Malta
3 points	Norway	Switzerland
2 points	Netherlands	Hungary
1 point	Lithuania	Serbia

Points awarded by Estonia (Final)
Score	Televote	Jury
12 points	Belgium	Bulgaria
10 points	Portugal	Norway
8 points	Hungary	Portugal
7 points	Bulgaria	Australia
6 points	Romania	United Kingdom
5 points	Italy	Denmark
4 points	Moldova	Netherlands
3 points	Sweden	Sweden
2 points	Belarus	Belgium
1 point	France	Hungary

==== Detailed voting results ====
The following members comprised the Estonian jury:

- Olavi Paide (jury chairperson) – TV producer
- Rasmus Rändvee – singer
- Getter Jaani – singer, represented Estonia in the 2011 contest
- Jakko Maltis – singer
- Marju Länik – singer

Detailed voting results from Estonia (Semi-final 2)
R/O	Country	Jury							Televote	
R/O	Country	O. Paide	R. Rändvee	G. Jaani	J. Maltis	M. Länik	Rank	Points	Rank	Points
01	Serbia	17	9	9	7	12	10	1	17	
02	Austria	6	6	1	5	13	6	5	11	
03	Macedonia	16	13	10	14	7	12		13	
04	Malta	7	7	6	10	8	7	4	14	
05	Romania	14	17	14	16	4	14		1	12
06	Netherlands	15	5	4	4	3	5	6	9	2
07	Hungary	11	8	13	6	9	9	2	3	8
08	Denmark	8	2	5	3	2	3	8	15	
09	Ireland	3	4	7	9	6	4	7	4	7
10	San Marino	12	16	15	17	17	17		16	
11	Croatia	10	10	12	11	11	11		6	5
12	Norway	2	1	3	2	5	2	10	8	3
13	Switzerland	4	11	8	8	10	8	3	12	
14	Belarus	9	12	17	13	15	15		5	6
15	Bulgaria	1	3	2	1	1	1	12	2	10
16	Lithuania	5	15	16	15	16	16		10	1
17	Estonia									
18	Israel	13	14	11	12	14	13		7	4

Detailed voting results from Estonia (Final)
R/O	Country	Jury							Televote	
R/O	Country	O. Paide	R. Rändvee	G. Jaani	J. Maltis	M. Länik	Rank	Points	Rank	Points
01	Israel	25	19	14	20	15	17		19	
02	Poland	12	11	17	14	8	12		22	
03	Belarus	26	15	18	19	21	21		9	2
04	Austria	11	13	3	11	20	11		17	
05	Armenia	22	9	16	12	18	13		24	
06	Netherlands	10	4	4	7	12	7	4	15	
07	Moldova	21	23	19	21	17	22		7	4
08	Hungary	20	8	11	6	9	10	1	3	8
09	Italy	14	26	24	24	13	23		6	5
10	Denmark	9	3	10	3	4	6	5	20	
11	Portugal	3	7	5	10	2	3	8	2	10
12	Azerbaijan	6	22	25	15	11	15		16	
13	Croatia	19	17	23	25	22	25		13	
14	Australia	4	5	9	5	5	4	7	12	
15	Greece	16	21	22	18	19	19		23	
16	Spain	17	24	13	26	26	26		25	
17	Norway	7	2	2	2	10	2	10	11	
18	United Kingdom	5	6	1	9	7	5	6	18	
19	Cyprus	23	12	21	13	24	16		14	
20	Romania	24	25	12	23	14	20		5	6
21	Germany	15	20	26	17	25	24		26	
22	Ukraine	18	10	20	22	23	18		21	
23	Belgium	2	16	7	8	6	9	2	1	12
24	Sweden	8	14	8	4	3	8	3	8	3
25	Bulgaria	1	1	6	1	1	1	12	4	7
26	France	13	18	15	16	16	14		10	1
