= Winny Puhh =

Estonian musical group

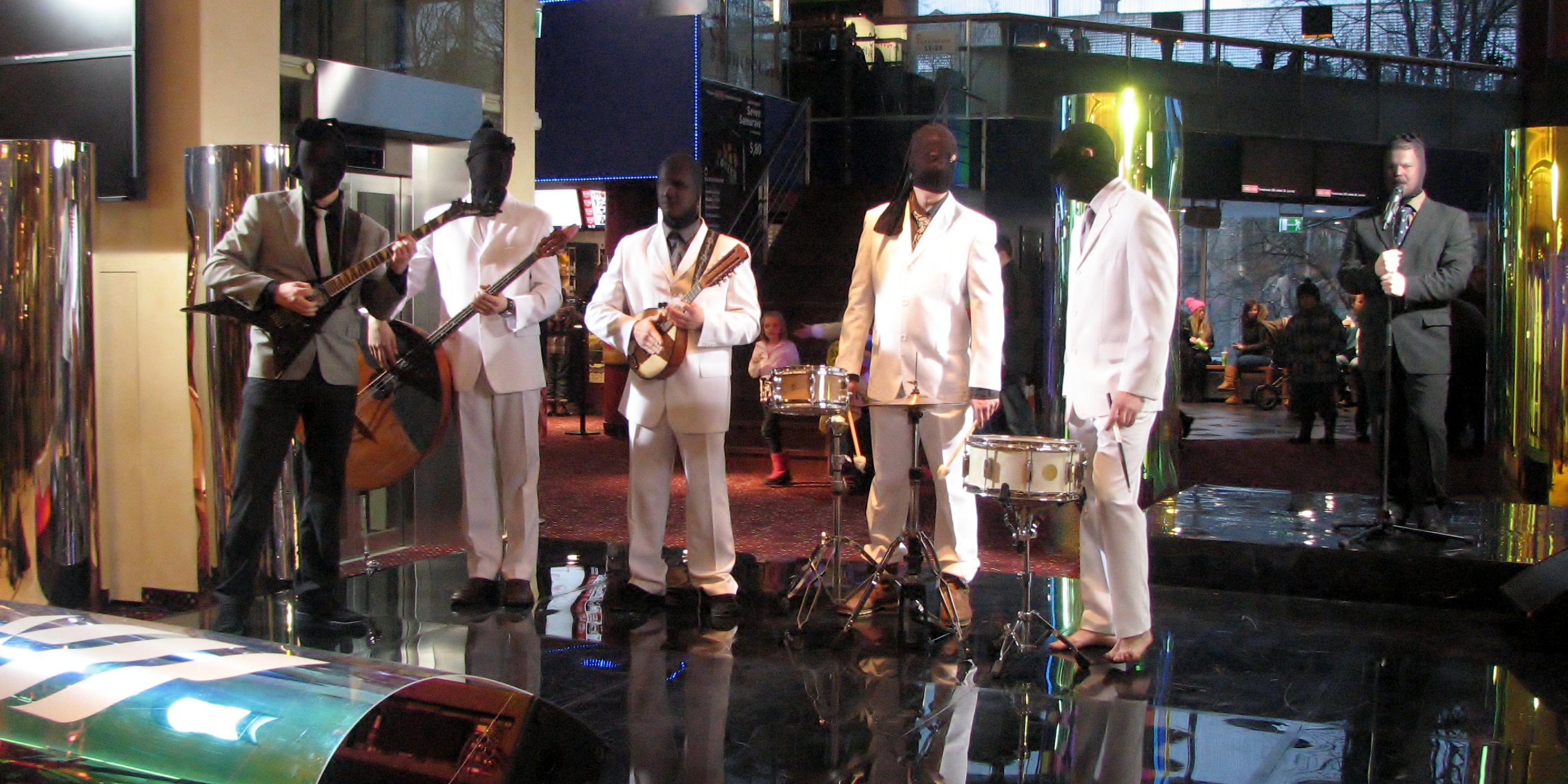
- Winny Puhh performing on the television show Ringvaade

Background information
- Origin: Põlva, Estonia
- Genres: Punk rock, Heavy metal
- Years active: 1993–
- Label: Legendaarne Records
- Members: Indrek Vaheoja; Silver Lepaste; Ove Musting; Indrek Nõmm; Kristjan Oden; Olavi Sander
- Website: www.myspace.com/winnypuhh/

Winny Puhh is an Estonian metal/punk band formed in 1993 in Põlva. The founding members, Ove, Indrek, and Olavi knew each other from school. In 2009, the drummer Olavi Sander (Olevik) temporarily left the band and was replaced by Kristjan (Väikepax). Later however Olevik returned and the band has two drummers now. Many of their performances involve costumes.

== Musical career ==
The band is named after Winnie-the-Pooh. After thirteen years together, they became better known in 2006 with the song "Nuudlid ja hapupiim" (Noodles and Sour Milk) winning them a spot on Raadio 2's yearly hit songs.

In 2008, Winny Puhh's music video "Vanamutt" (The Old Lady) was nominated for the Estonian Music Awards (Eesti Muusikaauhinnad). In 2009, Henry Kõrvits, better known under the stage name G-Enka, joined Winny Puhh for the song "Peegelpõrand" (Mirror Floor), garnering them sixth place with 456 votes in the 2009 Raadio 2 Top 40.

In 2013, Winny Puhh participated in the Estonian national final for the 2013 Eurovision Song Contest with the song "Meiecundimees üks Korsakov läks eile Lätti" (Korsakov, the guy around our area, went to Latvia yesterday), but they finished third behind Birgit Õigemeel and Grete Paia. Olav Ruitlane and Mr. Korsakov (the character in the song) were sent for press interviews. An extended version of "Meiecundimees üks Korsakov läks eile Lätti" was performed in Paris at the Rick Owens fashion show.

== Band members ==
- Indrek Vaheoja (Korraldajaonu) – Vocals
- Silver Lepaste (Kartauto) – Guitar
- Ove Musting (Jürnas Farmer) – Guitar, Vocals
- Indrek Nõmm (Koeraonu) – Bass guitar
- Kristjan Oden (Väikepax) – drums, percussion
- Olavi Sander (Doktor O) – drums, percussion

== Albums ==
- Täämba õdagu praadimi kunna (Legendaarne Rokenroll Records, 2006)
- Brääznik (Legendaarne Rokenroll Records, 2010)
- Kes küsib (Clockwork Records, 2014)

== Articles ==
- Vidrik Võsoberg. Winny Puhh ajab udu ja teeb uut plaati. LõunaLeht, 7 July 2009
- Mari Leosk. Setod: Winny Puhh pole mingid setod. LõunaLeht, 28 January 2010
- Russell Smith. Who (or what) is Winny Puhh? You'd know if you saw the Eurovision Song Contest. The Globe and Mail, 3 April 2013
