= Trick question (disambiguation) =

A trick question is a question that confuses the person asked.

Trick question or Trick Question may also refer to:

- Complex question, a fallacy
- Trick Question, 1999 album by Caustic Resin, American indie rock band
- Trick Question (Estonian: Trikiga küsimus) a music performance by Meelis Kubo and other Estonian authors
