= Estonia in the Eurovision Song Contest 2026 =

- Eurovision Song Contest 2026
- Participating broadcaster: Eesti Rahvusringhääling (ERR)
- Country: Estonia
- Selection process: Eesti Laul 2026
- Selection date: 14 February 2026

Competing entry
- Song: "Too Epic to Be True"
- Artist: Vanilla Ninja
- Songwriters: Sven Lõhmus

Placement
- Semi-final result: Failed to qualify (11th)

Participation chronology

Estonia was represented at the Eurovision Song Contest 2026 with the song "Too Epic to Be True", written by Sven Lõhmus and performed by Vanilla Ninja. The Estonian participating broadcaster, Eesti Rahvusringhääling (ERR), organised the national final Eesti Laul 2026 in order to select its entry for the contest.

== Background ==
Prior to the 2026 contest, Eesti Televisioon (ETV) until 2007, and Eesti Rahvusringhääling (ERR) since 2008, had participated in the Eurovision Song Contest representing Estonia thirty times since ETV's first entry in 1994, winning the contest in 2001 with the song "Everybody" performed by Tanel Padar, Dave Benton and 2XL. Following the introduction of semi-finals in 2004, Estonia has, to this point, managed to qualify to the final on eleven occasions, including in 2025, when "Espresso Macchiato" performed by Tommy Cash ultimately placed third in the final.

As part of its duties as participating broadcaster, ERR organises the selection of its entry in the Eurovision Song Contest and broadcasts the event in the country. Since its debut, the Estonian broadcaster had organised national finals that featured a competition among multiple artists and songs in order to select its entry for the contest, with the Eesti Laul competition being organised since 2009. On 19 September 2025, ERR confirmed its participation at the 2026 contest and announced the organisation of Eesti Laul 2026 in order to select its entry.

== Before Eurovision ==
=== Eesti Laul 2026 ===
Eesti Laul 2026 was the 18th edition of the national selection Eesti Laul, organised by ERR to select its entry for the Eurovision Song Contest 2026. The competition consisted of a 12-song final on 14 February 2026 at the Unibet Arena in Tallinn, and was hosted by Karl-Erik Taukar and Karl "Korea" Kivastik.

==== Competing entries ====
On 19 September 2025, ERR opened the submission period for artists and composers to submit their entries up until 20 October 2025. Each artist and songwriter was only able to submit a maximum of five entries. Foreign collaborations were allowed as long as one of the songwriters were Estonian. A fee was also imposed on songs being submitted to the competition, with €50 for songs in the Estonian language and €100 for songs in other languages. Both of the fees increased for entries submitted from 17 October 2025: €150 for songs in the Estonian language and €250 for songs in other languages. 171 submissions were received by the deadline, of which 77 were in Estonian. A 34-member jury panel selected 12 finalists from the submissions and the selected songs were announced during the ETV entertainment program Ringvaade on 30 and 31 October 2025.

Among the competing artists were previous Eurovision Song Contest entrants Vanilla Ninja, who represented Switzerland in 2005, Getter Jaani, who represented Estonia in 2011, Stig Rästa (as member of Stockholm Cowboys), who represented Estonia in 2015 with Elina Born, and Victor Crone (as member of Stockholm Cowboys), who represented Estonia in 2019. Ant, Grete Paia, Laura Prits, Marta Pikani, Minimal Wind, Noëp, Ollie and Robert Linna have all competed in previous editions of Eesti Laul.

Selection jury members
- An-Marlen
- Andrei Zevakin
- Andres Aljaste
- Ave Sophia Demelemester
- Eda-Ines Etti
- Eleryn Tiit
- Eva Palm
- Evelin Võigemast
- Frederik Küüts
- Grete Kuld
- Henri Laumets
- Indrek Sarrap
- Isabella Runge
- Kaarel Sein
- Kadi-Maarja Võsu
- Karl-Ander Reismann
- Kristo Veinberg
- Magnus Müürsepp
- Maian Kärmas
- Marek Miil
- Maris Järva
- Maris Kõrvits
- Meelis Kompus
- Mihkel Sirelpuu
- Neit-Eerik Nestor
- Petr Sushkov
- Rahel Ollisaar
- Ramo Teder
- Raul Ojamaa
- Robert Kõrvits
- Sander Allikmäe
- Sander Varusk
- Teet Kask
- Ülar-Johannes Palm

Eesti Laul 2026 participating entries
Artist	Song	Songwriter(s)
Ant and Minimal Wind	"Wounds (Don't Wanna Fall)"	Ant Nurhan; Katrina Merily Reimand; Paula Pajusaar; Taavi-Hans Kõlar
Clicherik and Mäx	"Jolly Roger"	Erik Soasepp; Jānis Jačmenkins; Max Õispuu
Getter Jaani	"The Game"	Sven Lõhmus
Grete Paia	"Taevas jäi üles"	Gevin Niglas; Grete Paia; Jorma-Jan Erik; Ragnar Sepp
Laura Prits	"Warrior"	Edgars Jercums; Jānis Jačmenkins; Laura Prits
Marta Pikani	"Kell kuus"	Marta Pikani
Noëp	"Days Like This"	Andres Kõpper; Vallo Kikas; Yvonne Dahlbom
Ollie	"Slave"	Oliver Mazurtšak
Robert Linna	"Metsik roos"	Robert Linna
Stockholm Cowboys	"Last Man Standing"	Stig Rästa; Victor Crone
Uliana Olhyna	"Rhythm of Nature"	Ariana Arutjunjan; Uliana Olhyna
Vanilla Ninja	"Too Epic to Be True"	Sven Lõhmus

==== Final ====
The final took place on 14 February 2026.

Final – 14 February 2026
R/O	Artist	Song	Jury		Public vote		Total	Place
R/O	Artist	Song	Votes	Points	Votes	Points	Total	Place
1	Clicherik and Mäx	"Jolly Roger"	25	4	3,849	7	11	7
2	Robert Linna	"Metsik roos"	30	5	394	1	6	11
3	Grete Paia	"Taevas jäi üles"	14	1	2,804	6	7	10
4	Laura Prits	"Warrior"	31	6	650	2	8	9
5	Uliana Olhyna	"Rhythm of Nature"	24	3	1,742	5	8	8
6	Ollie	"Slave"	65	12	6,410	10	22	1
7	Marta Pikani	"Kell kuus"	19	2	738	3	5	12
8	Noëp	"Days Like This"	56	9	7,792	11	20	2
9	Getter Jaani	"The Game"	42	8	6,215	9	17	5
10	Ant and Minimal Wind	"Wounds (Don't Wanna Fall)"	58	10	1,387	4	14	6
11	Vanilla Ninja	"Too Epic to Be True"	37	7	10,070	12	19	3
12	Stockholm Cowboys	"Last Man Standing"	63	11	4,628	8	19	4

Detailed jury votes
R/O	Song	J. Roy	R. Milone	P. Jordan	M. Faust	A. Stolpe	K. Hughes	L. Deb	R. Linn	Total
1	"Jolly Roger"		2	3	5	1	5	7	2	25
2	"Metsik roos"	7	7		12	4				30
3	"Taevas jäi üles"		6	2			2	1	3	14
4	"Warrior"	12	3	4		3	1		8	31
5	"Rhythm of Nature"	3		1	4	2	3	6	5	24
6	"Slave"	5	4	7	3	12	12	10	12	65
7	"Kell kuus"	8			1	5		4	1	19
8	"Days Like This"	6	10	6	8	10	7	3	6	56
9	"The Game"	4	1	5	2	8	4	8	10	42
10	"Wounds (Don't Wanna Fall)"	10	5	8	7	6	10	5	7	58
11	"Too Epic to Be True"	1	8	10	10		6	2		37
12	"Last Man Standing"	2	12	12	6	7	8	12	4	63

Superfinal – 14 February 2026
Artist	Song	Votes	Place
Ollie	"Slave"	15,148	3
Noëp	"Days Like This"	15,161	2
Vanilla Ninja	"Too Epic to Be True"	16,584	1

== At Eurovision ==
The Eurovision Song Contest 2026 took place at the Wiener Stadthalle in Vienna, Austria, and consisted of two semi-finals held on the respective dates of 12 and 14 May and the final on 16 May 2026. All nations with the exceptions of the host country and the "Big Four" (France, Germany, Italy and the United Kingdom) were required to qualify from one of two semi-finals in order to compete for the final; the top ten countries from each semi-final progressed to the final. On 12 January 2026, an allocation draw was held to determine which of the two semi-finals, as well as which half of the show, each country performed in; the European Broadcasting Union (EBU) split up the competing countries into different pots based on voting patterns from previous contests, with countries with favourable voting histories put into the same pot.

=== Semi final ===
Estonia was allocated for the first semi final, and later, was announced to perform in position nine during the show. Shortly after, the qualification–announcement segment took place, and, at the end of the segment Estonia was not announced as one of the ten qualifiers, therefore, Estonia would not move on onto the final, for the first time since 2021.

=== Voting ===
==== Points awarded to Estonia ====
Points awarded to Estonia (Semi-final 1)
Score	Televote	Jury
12 points	Finland	
10 points		
8 points	Lithuania	
7 points	Sweden	
6 points		Israel; Italy; Serbia
5 points		
4 points	San Marino	Lithuania
3 points	Israel; Poland	Belgium; Greece; Moldova
2 points	Croatia; Moldova; Serbia	Sweden
1 point	Belgium; Germany; Portugal	

==== Points awarded by Estonia ====
Points awarded by Estonia (Semi-final 1)
Score	Televote	Jury
12 points	Finland	Finland
10 points	Israel	Poland
8 points	Portugal	Belgium
7 points	Moldova	Greece
6 points	Lithuania	Croatia
5 points	Serbia	Sweden
4 points	Poland	Israel
3 points	Croatia	Lithuania
2 points	Sweden	Portugal
1 point	Greece	San Marino

Points awarded by Estonia (Final)
Score	Televote	Jury
12 points	Finland	Finland
10 points	Moldova	Norway
8 points	Ukraine	Denmark
7 points	Bulgaria	Bulgaria
6 points	Italy	Italy
5 points	Australia	Poland
4 points	Romania	Croatia
3 points	Greece	Greece
2 points	Denmark	Belgium
1 point	Israel	Czechia

==== Detailed voting results ====
Each participating broadcaster assembles a seven-member jury panel consisting of music industry professionals who are citizens of the country they represent and two of which have to be between 18 and 25 years old. Each jury, and individual jury member, is required to meet a strict set of criteria regarding professional background, as well as diversity in gender and age. No member of a national jury was permitted to be related in any way to any of the competing acts in such a way that they cannot vote impartially and independently. The individual rankings of each jury member as well as the nation's televoting results were released shortly after the grand final.

The following members comprised the Estonian jury:

- Alexander Makarov
- Karl Killing
- Sebastian Koljak
- Eva Palm
- Isabella Runge
- Kaidi Klein
- Inger Fridolin

Detailed voting results from Estonia (Semi-final 1)
R/O	Country	Jury									Televote	
R/O	Country	Juror A	Juror B	Juror C	Juror D	Juror E	Juror F	Juror G	Rank	Points	Rank	Points
01	Moldova	12	10	10	9	8	12	8	12		4	7
02	Sweden	3	3	8	6	3	10	7	6	5	9	2
03	Croatia	10	7	7	8	4	1	4	5	6	8	3
04	Greece	5	8	2	3	5	11	2	4	7	10	1
05	Portugal	8	6	9	5	13	7	9	9	2	3	8
06	Georgia	9	12	12	12	10	8	12	13		14	
07	Finland	1	1	1	1	1	9	1	1	12	1	12
08	Montenegro	11	11	13	11	11	2	11	11		13	
09	Estonia											
10	Israel	6	9	3	10	9	5	6	7	4	2	10
11	Belgium	2	2	4	7	7	4	5	3	8	11	
12	Lithuania	13	14	5	4	6	3	13	8	3	5	6
13	San Marino	4	4	11	14	14	13	10	10	1	12	
14	Poland	7	5	6	2	2	6	3	2	10	7	4
15	Serbia	14	13	14	13	12	14	14	14		6	5

Detailed voting results from Estonia (Final)
R/O	Country	Jury									Televote	
R/O	Country	Juror A	Juror B	Juror C	Juror D	Juror E	Juror F	Juror G	Rank	Points	Rank	Points
01	Denmark	4	7	8	3	2	13	9	3	8	9	2
02	Germany	22	22	19	17	7	22	23	18		25	
03	Israel	9	12	14	16	10	6	11	14		10	1
04	Belgium	8	6	15	4	11	14	10	9	2	23	
05	Albania	19	19	22	22	19	19	13	23		22	
06	Greece	11	10	7	7	14	4	6	8	3	8	3
07	Ukraine	13	17	6	15	3	20	14	12		3	8
08	Australia	3	11	18	10	13	11	15	13		6	5
09	Serbia	20	18	24	23	25	25	24	25		13	
10	Malta	21	21	17	20	24	5	22	17		15	
11	Czechia	14	4	10	18	9	21	4	10	1	18	
12	Bulgaria	5	5	2	5	21	7	7	4	7	4	7
13	Croatia	18	16	3	11	1	17	16	7	4	17	
14	United Kingdom	23	25	23	21	20	9	17	21		19	
15	France	10	15	13	14	5	12	18	16		14	
16	Moldova	24	14	9	13	4	18	12	15		2	10
17	Finland	1	1	1	2	15	2	1	1	12	1	12
18	Poland	12	3	11	12	8	10	3	6	5	21	
19	Lithuania	25	23	25	25	18	15	25	24		16	
20	Sweden	7	9	5	8	17	16	8	11		12	
21	Cyprus	15	13	21	24	22	23	19	22		20	
22	Italy	6	8	12	6	12	3	5	5	6	5	6
23	Norway	2	2	4	1	6	1	2	2	10	11	
24	Romania	16	20	20	9	16	24	20	20		7	4
25	Austria	17	24	16	19	23	8	21	19		24	
