= Facelift Deer =

Estonian musical group

Facelift Deer is an alternative rock band from Pärnu, Estonia.

Facelift Deer was formed in 2010 by a former guitarist/vocalist Gertrud Luhaoja and Aap-Eerik Lai. After a few months of playing stoner rock, Paal Piller joined the band with singer Erko Elblaus following shortly after. Two singles, now more alternative than stoner rock, “Eiffel” and “Harlequin” were released and well received in the hometown's music scene. After the short burst of small-town success there came a realization that the band's progress had died along with it. Soon Erko Elblaus and Gertrud Luhaoja were replaced by Rasmus Rändvee and Karl Kallas respectively. In 2011, Facelift Deer took part in a nationwide band contest “Noortebänd” but didn't have major success due to inexperience of playing live. This motivated band to work even harder and soon the first single “Brothers” was released, which was named “Best new demo” by nationwide radio station R2.

In the end of 2012 they had another go at the contest “Noortebänd”, only to quit it early due to Rändvee's success in Estonian Pop Idol. This solo success created tension among band members. As Rasmus continued towards the finals, the band kept on working on new material and submitted the single “Dance” to the Eesti Laul – Estonian finals for Eurovision Song Contest. “Dance” was first performed in the final of Pop Idol where Rändvee won the title and an album deal with Universal Music. This success was continued by reaching the 8th place in “Eesti Laul” with “Dance”. A series of concerts began and at the same time the band started working on an album. In the summer of 2013 the recording process started with the producer Sethh, which resulted in a self-titled album in cooperation with Universal Music. The album received two awards in the Estonian Music Awards contest - "Best newcomer" & "Best Rock Album".
