= La forza (song) =

Estonian entry in the Eurovision Song Contest 2018

Single by Elina Nechayeva

from the album The Sound of Beauty
- Released: 22 January 2018
- Genre: Operatic pop
- Length: 3:04
- Label: Timulition
- Songwriters: Ksenia Kuchukova; Mihkel Mattisen; Elina Nechayeva; Timo Vendt

Music video
- "La forza" on YouTube

Eurovision Song Contest 2018 entry
- Country: Estonia
- Artist: Elina Nechayeva
- Language: Italian
- Composers: Mihkel Mattisen; Timo Vendt
- Lyricists: Ksenia Kuchukova; Elina Nechayeva

Finals performance
- Semi-final result: 5th
- Semi-final points: 201
- Final result: 8th
- Final points: 245

Entry chronology
- ◄ "Verona" (2017)
- "Storm" (2019) ►

"La forza" (Italian pronunciation: [la ˈfɔrtsa]; "[The] Strength" or "[The] Force") is a song recorded by Estonian singer Elina Nechayeva, released on 22 January 2018 by Timulition. The track was written by Ksenia Kuchukova, Elina Nechayeva, Mihkel Mattisen and Timo Vendt. Mihkel Mattisen previously wrote the 2013 Estonian entry for Eurovision, "Et uus saaks alguse" for Birgit, while Timo Vendt did the same in 2014, writing "Amazing" for Tanja.

The demo version of the song was written by Timo Vendt, and Mihkel Mattisen composed the melody specifically for Elina Nechayeva, taking into account her vocal range and unique voice characteristics. Mart Normet, the producer of the Estonian competition Eesti Laul, asked the authors to rework the song's production, as the instrumental was dominating the vocals. Mattisen said about the final result: “I don't think I've ever worked so hard and with such dedication on any other song.”

== Eurovision Song Contest ==
"La forza" represented Estonia in the Eurovision Song Contest 2018 in Lisbon, Portugal after winning the pre-selection show Eesti Laul. The song competed in the final, held on 12 May 2018, after qualifying from the first semi-final. It came in eighth place with 245 points.

== Track listing ==
Digital download
No.	Title	Length
1.	"La forza"	3:04

== Charts ==
Chart (2018)	Peak position
Estonia (Eesti Tipp-40)	19
Estonia Domestic (Eesti Tipp-40)	1
France (SNEP)	115

== Release history ==
Region	Date	Format	Label
Worldwide	22 January 2018	Digital download	Timulition
