= Bridges (Alika song) =

2022 song by Alika

Single by Alika

from the album Alika
- Language: English
- Released: 2 December 2022
- Length: 3:05
- Label: Universal Music Oy
- Songwriters: Alika Milova; Wouter Hardy; Nina Sampermans

Alika singles chronology
| "C'est La Vie" (2022) | "Bridges" (2022) | "You" (2023) |

Music video
- "Bridges" on YouTube

Eurovision Song Contest 2023 entry
- Country: Estonia
- Artist: Alika
- Language: English
- Composers: Alika Milova; Wouter Hardy
- Lyricists: Alika Milova; Wouter Hardy; Nina Sampermans

Finals performance
- Semi-final result: 10th
- Semi-final points: 74
- Final result: 8th
- Final points: 168

Entry chronology
- ◄ "Hope" (2022)
- "(Nendest) narkootikumidest ei tea me (küll) midagi" (2024) ►

Official performance video
- "Bridges" (Second Semi-Final) on YouTube "Bridges" (Grand Final) on YouTube

"Bridges" is a song by Estonian singer Alika Milova, released on 2 December 2022. It represented Estonia in the Eurovision Song Contest 2023 after winning Eesti Laul 2023, Estonia's national selection for that year's Eurovision Song Contest. At the final it finished in eighth place and charted in Iceland, UK, Sweden, Lithuania and Netherlands.

== Background and composition ==
In an interview with the Eurovision fansite ESCUnited, "Bridges" was inspired by a recording session that took place in the Netherlands along with fellow songwriter Wouter Hardy. According to Milova, she was feeling "some kind of anxiety", and proceeded to cry in a nearby bathroom. Hardy would then propose to take Milova out for lunch to vent her anxiety out to Hardy. Although hesitant, she decided to take the offer and afterwards, decided to write some music on Hardy's piano at his house, composing "Bridges" in the span of three hours.

To Milova, "Bridges" represented the feelings that she had felt during that day in the recording studio. The reason why she had chosen the title "Bridges" was that she wanted listeners to communicate within themselves and with the others around them, even in a feeling where "[you are] lost in a big world, with a lot of people surrounding you."

At Eurovision in Liverpool, Alika was accompanied by two backing singers off-stage, Sofia-Liis Liiv and Grettel Killing.

== Eurovision Song Contest ==
=== Eesti Laul 2023 ===
Eesti Laul 2023 was the fifteenth edition of the Estonian national selection Eesti Laul, which would select Estonia's entry for the Eurovision Song Contest 2023. The competition would consist of twenty entries competing in two semi-finals on 12 and 14 January 2023 culminating to a twelve-song final on 11 February 2023.

"Bridges" would compete in the second semi-final on 14 January, competing last of all ten entries. The results of the semi-finals were determined by the 50/50 combination of votes from a professional jury and public televoting for the first four qualifiers, and a second round of public televoting for the fifth qualifier. The public would also select two wildcards out of the remaining non-qualifying acts from both semi-finals to complete the twelve song lineup in the final. "Bridges" would manage to qualify as one of the four songs that qualified from the combination of votes from the juries and the public, moving on to the final.

Heading into the final, "Bridges" was considered one of the favorites to win the competition by Eurovision fansites. In the final, the winner was selected over two rounds of voting. In the first round, a jury (50%) and public televote (50%) determined the top three entries to proceed to the superfinal. After heading to the superfinal, "Bridges" was selected as the winner by a public televote, thus earning the Estonian spot for the Eurovision Song Contest 2023.

=== At Eurovision ===
According to Eurovision rules, all nations with the exceptions of the host country and the "Big Five" (France, Germany, Italy, Spain and the United Kingdom) are required to qualify from one of two semi-finals in order to compete for the final; the top ten countries from each semi-final progress to the final. The European Broadcasting Union (EBU) split up the competing countries into six different pots based on voting patterns from previous contests, with countries with favourable voting histories put into the same pot. On 31 January 2023, an allocation draw was held which placed each country into one of the two semi-finals, as well as which half of the show they would perform in. Estonia was placed into the second semi-final, held on 11 May 2023, and performed in the first half of the show. Bridges would go on to win Song of the Year at the Estonian Music Awards 2024.

== Charts ==
Chart performance for "Bridges"
| Chart (2023) | Peak position |
|---|---|
| Iceland (Tónlistinn) | 40 |
| Lithuania (AGATA) | 20 |
| Netherlands (Single Tip) | 23 |
| Sweden Heatseeker (Sverigetopplistan) | 17 |
| UK Singles Downloads (Official Charts) | 51 |
