= Sven Lõhmus =

Estonian composer and lyricist (born 1972)

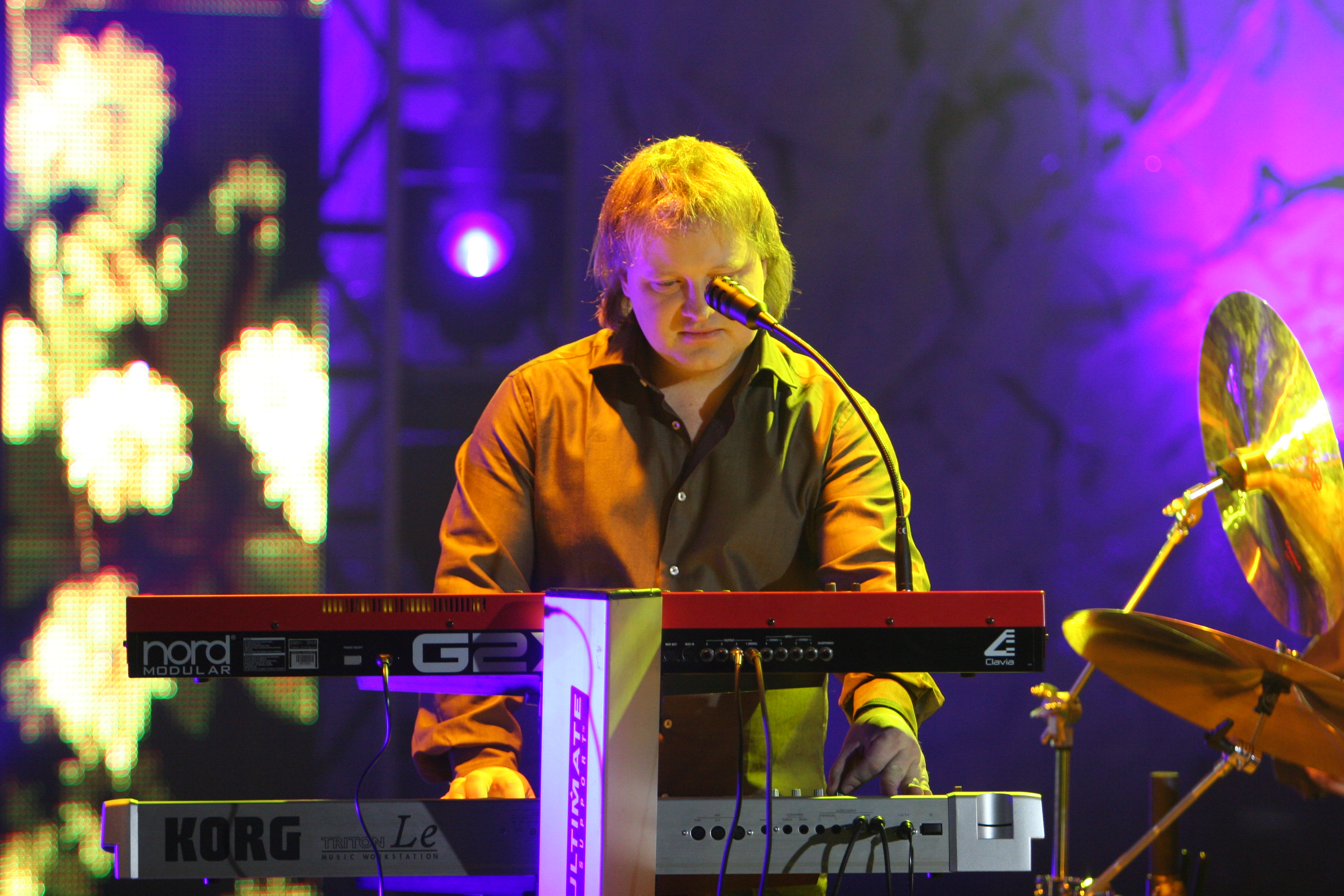
- Lõhmus at Eurosong 2007

Background information
- Born: 13 July 1972 (age 54); Estonia, then Estonian SSR, Soviet Union
- Origin: Estonia
- Genre: Pop
- Occupations: Record producer; composer; lyricist
- Formerly of: Beatboy

Sven Lõhmus (born 13 July 1972) is an Estonian pop-composer, lyricist, and producer at Moonwalk Studios, a music company featuring Estonian artists.

He has worked with leading artists of Estonia, including Vanilla Ninja, for which he was a manager, Suntribe, Urban Symphony, Grete Paia, Laura Põldvere, and Getter Jaani. In 2003, 2004, and 2010, Lõhmus won the award for "Best Author" from the "Eesti Popmuusika Aastaauhinnad". He was also the lead singer of the bands Mr. Happyman and Black Velvet.

== Songwriting discography ==
=== Eurovision Song Contest ===
- "Let's Get Loud" by Suntribe (Estonia 2005), 20th place (semi-final; failed to qualify)
- "Rändajad" by Urban Symphony (Estonia 2009), 6th place
- "Rockefeller Street" by Getter Jaani (Estonia 2011), 24th place
- "Verona" by Koit Toome & Laura (Estonia 2017), 14th place (semi-final; failed to qualify)
- "Too Epic to Be True" by Vanilla Ninja (Estonia 2026), 11th place (semi-final; failed to qualify)

=== Junior Eurovision Song Contest ===
- "Tänavad" by Annabelle (Estonia 2024), 14th place

=== National final entries ===
Eesti Laul entries

- "Too Epic to Be True" by Vanilla Ninja (2026), 1st place
- "The Game" by Getter Jaani (2026), 5th place
- "Serotoniin" by Anet Vaikmaa (2023), 9th in the semi-final
- "Sandra" by Black Velvet (2022), 5th place
- "Verona" by Koit Toome & Laura (2017), 1st place (14th in the semi-final at Eurovision 2017; failed to qualify)
- "Stories Untold" by Grete Paia (2016), 7th place
- "Kui tuuled pöörduvad" by Sandra Nurmsalu (2014), 5th place
- "Päästke noored hinged" by Grete Paia (2013), 2nd place
- "Rockefeller Street" by Getter Jaani (2011), 1st place (24th place at Eurovision in 2011)
- "Destiny" by Laura Põldvere (2009), 3rd place
- "Rändajad" by Urban Symphony (2009), 1st place (6th place at Eurovision 2009)

Eurolaul entries

- "Sunflowers" by Laura Põldvere (2007), 3rd place
- "Let's Get Loud" by Suntribe (2005), 1st place, (20th place in the semi-final at Eurovision 2005; failed to qualify)
- "Moonwalk" by Laura Põldvere (2005), 2nd place
- "I Can B the 1" by Nightlight Duo (2003), 4th place
- "Another Country Song" by Nightlight Duo and Cowboys (2002), 2nd place
- "Life is a Beautiful Word" by Soul Control (2001), 5th place
- "Maailm kahele" by Mona and Karl Madis (1998), 9th place

=== Other ===
- "Bravely" (as part of Beatboy), 1992
