= Too Epic to Be True =

2026 single by Vanilla Ninja

Single by Vanilla Ninja

from the album The Hits
- Language: English
- Released: 5 December 2025
- Genre: Pop rock
- Length: 2:59
- Songwriter: Sven Lõhmus

Music videos
- "Too Epic to Be True" on YouTube "Too Epic to Be True" (alternative version) on YouTube

Eurovision Song Contest 2026 entry
- Country: Estonia
- Artist: Vanilla Ninja
- Languages: English

Finals performance
- Semi-final result: 11th
- Semi-final points: 79

Entry chronology
- ◄ "Espresso Macchiato" (2025)

Official performance video
- "Too Epic to Be True" (first semi-final) on YouTube

"Too Epic to Be True" is a song by Estonian band Vanilla Ninja. It represented Estonia at the Eurovision Song Contest 2026 after winning Estonia's Eurovision national final, Eesti Laul 2026.

== Eurovision Song Contest 2026 ==
=== Eesti Laul 2026 ===
Eesti Laul 2026 was the 18th edition of the national selection Eesti Laul, organised by ERR to select its entry for the Eurovision Song Contest 2026. The competition consisted of a 12-song final on 14 February 2026 at the Unibet Arena in Tallinn.

A 34-member jury panel selected Vanilla Ninja as one of the finalists from the submissions with the song "Too Epic to Be True", which was announced during the ETV entertainment program Ringvaade on 30 and 31 October 2025. They previously represented Switzerland in 2005 with the song "Cool Vibes". In the final, they finished in sixth and first place in the juries and public televoting respectively, earning a total of 19 points. In the superfinal, Vanilla Ninja earned approximately 35% of the total televotes. As a result of winning the competition, they earned the right to represent Estonia in the Eurovision Song Contest 2026.

=== Eurovision 2026 ===
The Eurovision Song Contest 2026 took place at Wiener Stadthalle in Vienna, Austria, and consisted of two semi-finals to be held on the respective dates of 12 and 14 May and the final on 16 May 2026. During the allocation draw held on 12 January 2026, Estonia was drawn to compete in the first semi-final, performing in the second half of the show.

Estonia did not qualify for the final, finishing in 11th place. During the live performance, Vanilla Ninja was accompanied by a drummer Borka, and two backing singers off-stage, Kaire Vilgats and Dagmar Oja.

== Charts ==
=== Weekly charts ===
Weekly chart performance
Chart (2026)	Peak position
Estonia Airplay (TopHit)	16
Estonia Airplay (TopHit) ESC Version	32

=== Monthly charts ===
Monthly chart performance
Chart (2026)	Peak position
Estonia Airplay (TopHit)	25
Estonia Airplay (TopHit) ESC Version	70
