= Meelis Kubo =

Estonian magician (born 1982)

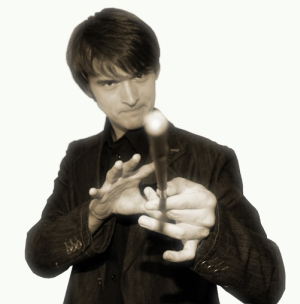
Meelis Kubo

Meelis Kubo (born 23 November 1982 in Tallinn) is an Estonian magician.

In autumn 2007, Kubo, in cooperation with Muusikamaailm Ltd, performed the full-length magic show Miraakel in 13 towns around Estonia. In 2008 Kubo, Charlekas, Kevin-Chris, Simeoni Sundja, and Tom Pintson performed the onstage magic show Tabalukk (Padlock).

Kubo is one of the founders and board members of the Society of Estonian Magicians, which was founded in 2008.

In February 2009, Kubo and Ande released a book of magic for children, Lembitu maagiline maailm (The Magical World of Lembit). Later that year, during the winter/spring season, Kubo and Charlekas performed on the Estonian national television channel ETV morning program Terevisioon on a weekly basis. In November 2009, Kubo and Charlekas debuted a new show, Räpane Sessioon (Dirty Session), where they played surgeons Doctor Cubo and Professor Charlekas.

In 2010, Meelis Kubo won first prize in the Estonian close-up magic competition. In 2014, Kinoteater, Charlekas and Kubo produced a stage play, Make My Wife Disappear, which explored the curiosities of being a magician. In 2016, Apollo Kino, Charlekas, and Kubo produced another play, Camera Trick.

In 2017, composer Kristo Matson, writer Ilmar Tomusk, magician Meelis Kubo, conductor Edmar Tuul and the Tallinn Philharmonic Society brought to stage Trick Question.

In 2018, Ott Sepp and Meelis Kubo co-hosted the final of the TV-show Eesti Laul, local song contest that determines Estonian representative for the Eurovision Song Contest.

In 2019, Meelis Kubo performed as an actor in Kellerteater's Alchemist in Love and in 2020, in Sleuth (Anthony Shaffer) as Milo.

== Works ==
- Mustkunstinurk, a weekly magic column in the daily newspaper Õhtuleht, April–June, 2007
- Lembitu maagiline maailm, co-written with Ande, 2009
