= Vinnytsia water tower =

Building in Vinnytsia, Ukraine

Vinnytsia old Water Tower
- Bashnia Kozytskoho
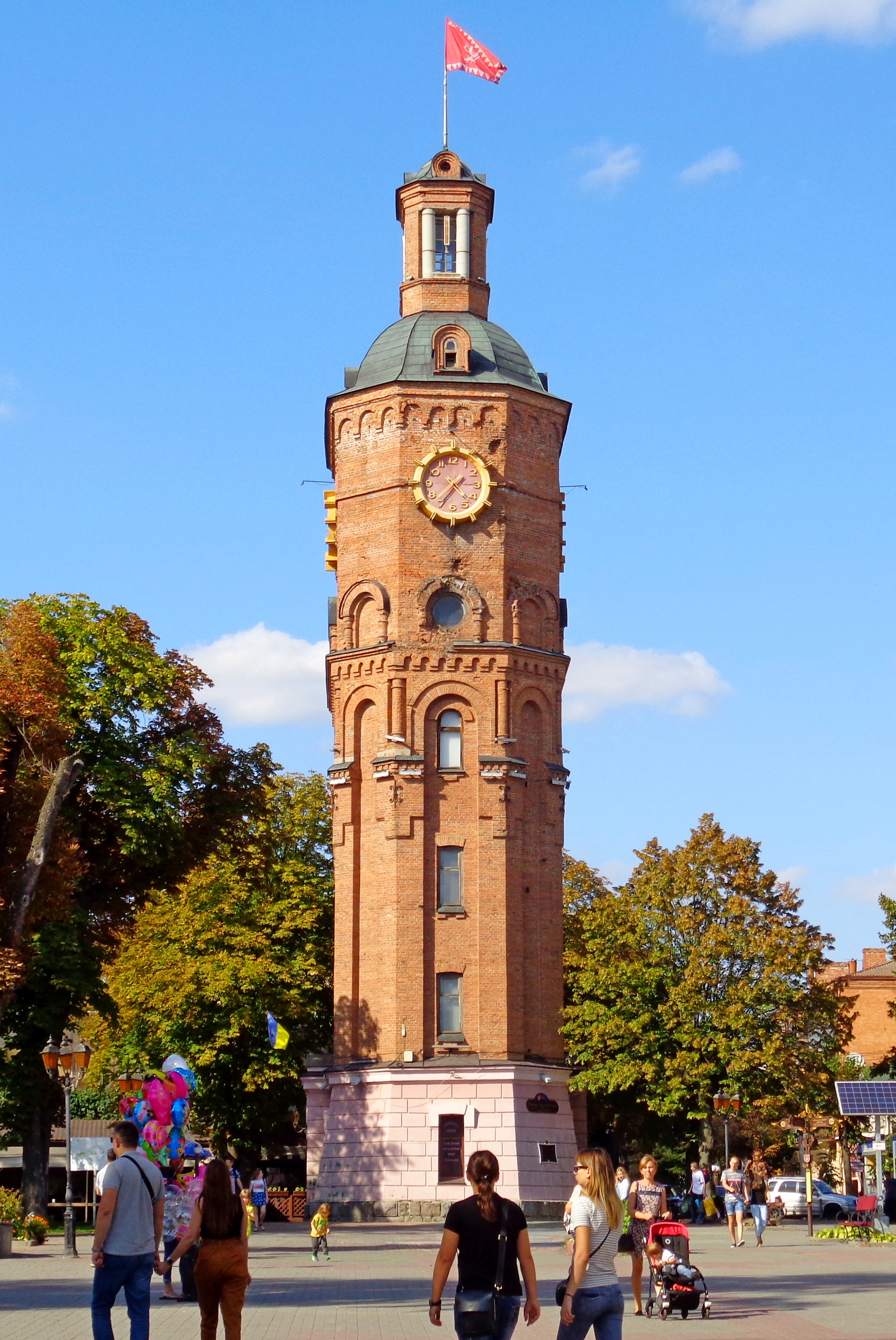
- Vinnytsia's old water tower (now the War Veterans' Museum)
- Interactive map of Vinnytsia old Water Tower
- Coordinates: 49°14′05″N 28°28′10″E
- Type: Tower
- Beginning date: 1912

The Vinnytsia water tower is a landmark of the city of Vinnytsia, Ukraine, constructed in 1912 and located on European Square. It was listed as a cultural monument of local significance on February 17, 1983. Vinnytsia water tower has served as a museum since 1985.

The tower was built in 1912, when the water pipe system was laid out in Vinnytsia. The tower doubled as a fire observation point. The architect was Grigory Artynov. The water was taken from the Southern Bug River and then distributed around the city center.

In 1920, the building stopped functioning as a water tower. During World War II it served as an observation tower, and after the war, it was converted into a residence. In 1985, it was transferred to Vinnytsia Regional Museum. First, it hosted an exposition on the history of the October Revolution and World War II. In 1993, an exposition devoted to the Soviet–Afghan War was added.

The tower has seven floors and is 28 metres (92 ft) high. It is made of brick.

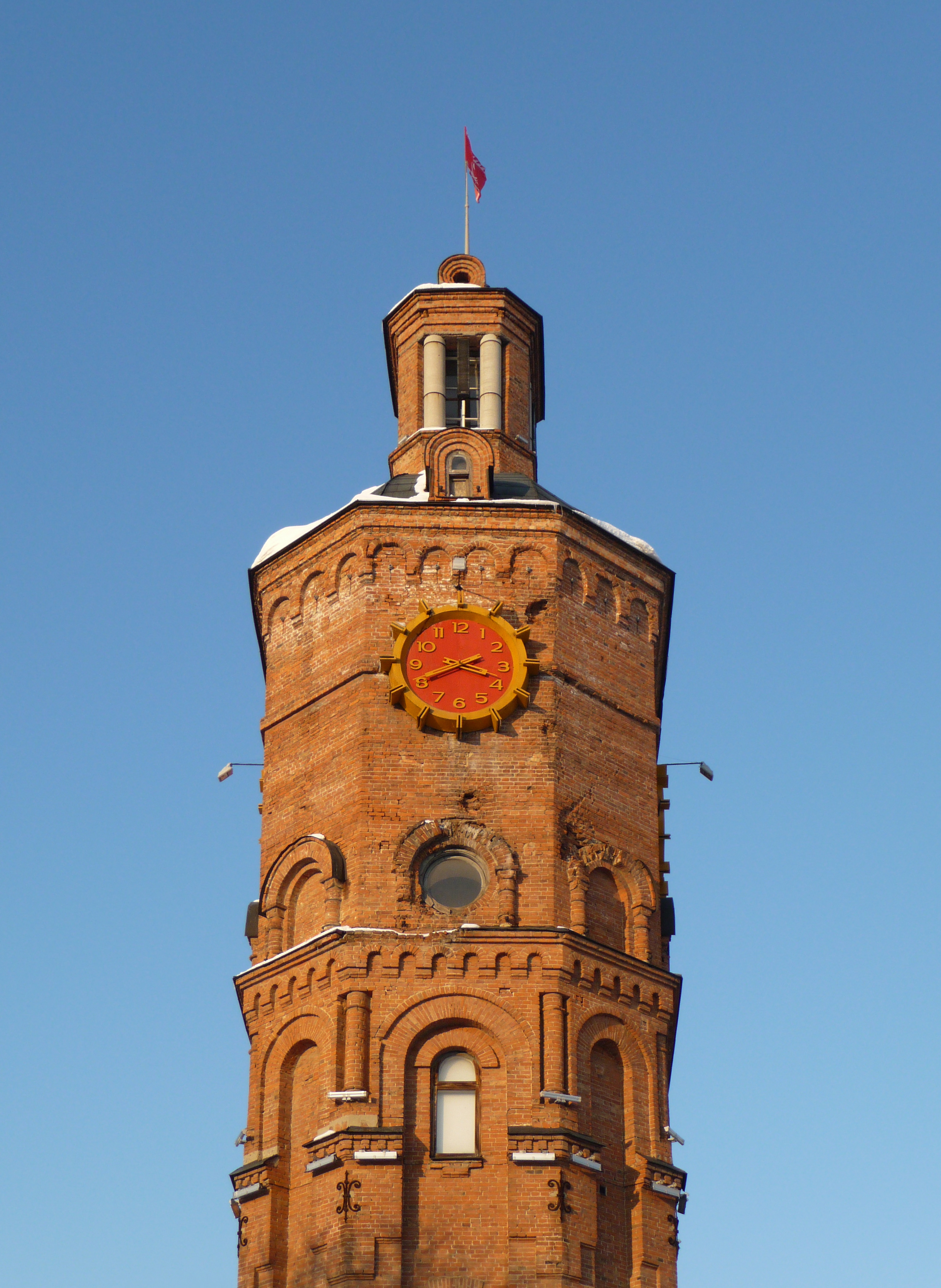
Detail of the clock
