= Verona (song) =

Estonian entry in the Eurovision Song Contest 2017

Single by Koit Toome & Laura
- Released: 30 January 2017
- Recorded: 2016
- Genre: Pop
- Length: 3:16
- Label: Moonwalk
- Songwriter(s): Sven Lõhmus
- Producer(s): Sven Lõhmus

Koit Toome singles chronology
"Pole Piiri" (2016)	"Verona" (2017)	"Your Stories" (2017)

Laura singles chronology
"94-95" (2016)	"Verona" (2017)	"Waterfall" (2017)

Eurovision Song Contest 2017 entry
- Country: Estonia
- Artist(s): Koit Toome & Laura
- Language: English
- Composer(s): Sven Lõhmus
- Lyricist(s): Sven Lõhmus

Finals performance
- Semi-final result: 14th
- Semi-final points: 85

Entry chronology
- ◄ "Play" (2016)
- "La forza" (2018) ►

"Verona" is an English-language song performed by Estonian singers Koit Toome and Laura.

The song represented Estonia in the Eurovision Song Contest 2017. It was written by Sven Lõhmus. The song was released as a digital download on 30 January 2017. The song's title and lyrics directly reference the Italian city of Verona.

== Eesti Laul 2017 ==
Toome and Laura were confirmed to be taking part in Eesti Laul 2017, Estonia's national final for the Eurovision Song Contest 2017, on 8 November 2016. They competed in the second semi-final on 18 February 2017, and placed second, placing first with televoters and fifth with juries. In the final, held on 4 March, they advanced to the superfinal after placing second, winning the televote once again and placing sixth with juries. In the superfinal, they won the televote and were crowned the winners.

== Eurovision Song Contest 2017 ==
The song represented Estonia in the Eurovision Song Contest 2017. Laura and Koit were joined off-stage by backing vocalists Kaire Vilgats, Dagmar Oja and Rolf Roosalu. Estonia competed in the second half of the second semi-final, performing 17th, second to last. During the performance, Laura's microphone failed, rendering the first line inaudible to the audience.

After receiving 85 points and placing 14th out of 18, they did not place among the top 10 songs that made it through to the final. Splitting up the points between televotes and jury votes showed the song once again place considerably higher with the audience (6th) than with the juries (17th).

== Track listing ==
Digital download
No.	Title	Length
1.	"Verona"	3:16

An Italian version of the song was recorded.

== Chart performance ==
=== Weekly charts ===
Chart (2017)	Peak position
Estonia (Radiomonitor)	1

== Release history ==
Region	Date	Format	Label
Worldwide	30 January 2017	Digital download	Moonwalk
