= Bedwetters (band) =

Estonian musical group

- Origin: Pärnu, Estonia
- Genres: Pop punk Post-hardcore; Electronicore; Electronic rock
- Years active: 2004–2013; 2022–present
- Members: Joosep Järvesaar; Mihkel Mõttus; Karl-Kristjan Kingi; Kaspar Koppel; Rauno Kutti
- Past members: Oliver Rull; Alo-Martin Mathiesen

Bedwetters are an Estonian pop punk band formed in September 2004. They became known in the spring of 2007 when they won a major contest for Estonian new groups. The band didn't play together between May 2013 and June 2022.

== Awards ==
One of the main prizes of the competition Bedwetters won, was to shoot a music video with acclaimed Estonian music video director Masa (Supersonic). The video for "Dramatic Letter To Conscience" received the highest possible rotation on MTV Baltic and band became hugely popular in all three Baltic countries after which they became one of the few Baltic acts that were nominated in the MTV EMA Munich 2007 New Sounds of Europe category. On 1 November Nelly Furtado and Snoop Dogg handed them the MTV award, they became the first Estonian artist ever to receive an MTV prize.

== Musical history ==
In spring 2008, Bedwetters was a support act for Good Charlotte & Avril Lavigne in Tallinn and spent the summer touring in the Baltics sharing the festival stages with the likes of Franz Ferdinand, Reamonn, Justice and many more.

In summer 2008, Bedwetters signed to a Swedish record label I Can Hear Music (TMC Entertainment) and the work on the debut album could begin. Petter Lantz (ex-Lambretta) was chosen to produce the material that the band had written during spring and summer 2008. The band headed to the studio in December and recording was finished in the end of January 2009. "Meet the Fucking Bedwetters" was released in Estonia and the world (iTunes) on 20 April 2009.

The video for the first single "Long.Some.Distance" off the debut album was directed by Henrik Hanson, long-time editor of Swedish music video wizards Jonas Akerlund and Johan Renck (RAF). The video received the highest rotation on MTV Baltics (Estonia, Latvia, Lithuania) and MTV Fresh award. The video also received airplay on MTV Sweden and Finland.

In 2009 and 2010, Bedwetters toured the Baltics, playing at festivals like Positivus, Be2gether, Fonofest, Baltic Beach Party, Reiu Rock and Rock Nights alongside Moby, Pete Doherty, Sinead O'Connor, Polarkreis 18, The Rasmus, ATB and many more.

On 16 August 2010, Radio 2 in Estonia, Radio 101 in Latvia, Opus3 in Lithuania and Radio Afera in Poland premiered the band's new single "Hayley". Video for "Hayley" was shot between 5–8 August in their hometown, Pärnu.

In May 2013, the band decided to break up and hold their final concert on 31 May 2013 in their hometown of Pärnu.

In 2023, the band participated in Eesti Laul 2023, the preselection for Estonia's entry in the Eurovision Song Contest 2023 with the song "Monsters". They competed in the first semi-final, and managed to qualify for the final. In the final, they managed to enter the superfinal, and eventually finished in third place.

== Members ==
- Joosep Järvesaar – lead vocals
- Karl-Kristjan Kingi – drums, backing vocals
- Rauno Kutti – guitar, backing vocals
- Mihkel Mõttus – guitar, backing vocals
- Kaspar Koppel – bass guitar

== Discography ==
=== Albums ===
- Meet the Fucking Bedwetters (20 April 2009)
- It Is What It Is (2024)

=== Singles ===
- "Dramatic Letter to Conscience" (2007)
- "So Long Nanny" (2008)
- "Long.Some.Distance" (2009)
- "Source of Inspiration" (2009)
- "Someone Worthless" (2009)
- "Hayley" (2010)
