= Ollie (singer) =

Estonian singer

- Born: Oliver Mazurtšak; 26 August 1993 (age 33); Tallinn, Estonia
- Genre: Rock
- Occupations: Singer; songwriter; guitarist; record producer
- Years active: 2015–present

Oliver Mazurtšak (born 26 August 1993), known professionally as OLLIE (stylised in all caps), is an Estonian singer, songwriter, guitarist, and record producer. His father is Jüri Mazurtšak, the drummer from the Estonian bands 2 Quick Start and Night Star, who participated in the Eurovision Song Contests of 1998 and 2002 together with the Estonian act on stage.

On 2 November 2022, it was announced that he would participate in Eesti Laul 2023 with the song "Venom". He participated in the first semi-final, and qualified for the final. In the final, he qualified for the superfinal and eventually came in second place after Alika.

On 6 November 2023, he was announced as one of the semi-finalists of Eesti Laul 2024, with the song "My Friend". He qualified for the final during the first round of the semi-final. In the final, he qualified for the superfinal and eventually came in second place after 5miinust and Puuluup.

On 14 February 2026, he participated in Eesti Laul 2026 with his song Slave. He got third place after Vanilla Ninja and Noëp, with 15,148 votes in the superfinal.

He is slated to participate in Eesti Laul 2027 with a song titled: Sad Every Day. It will be his 4th participation in the contest.

== Discography ==
=== Singles ===
- 2015 – Bonfire (featuring Uku Suviste)
- 2016 – Like This (featuring Mariliis Jõgeva)
- 2020 – Paradise feat. Mariliis Jõgeva
- 2021 – Let It Burn
- 2022 – Someone Else
- 2022 – Fake
- 2022 – Venom
- 2023 – Get High
- 2023 – My Friend
- 2024 – Heartless
- 2025 – Dwyh
- 2025 – Laid in L.A
- 2025 – Guardian Angel
- 2025 – That's What U Get
- 2025 – Slave
- 2026 – Bad Song
- 2026 – Drown

=== Albums ===
- 2026 – If Demons Are Real, So Are Angels

=== Charted singles ===
| Title | Year | Peak chart positions | Album |
| Title | Year | EST Air. | Album |
|---|---|---|---|
| "That's What U Get" | 2025 | 85 | Non-album singles |
| "Slave" | 2025 | 77 | Non-album singles |
| "Bad Song" | 2026 | 60 | Non-album singles |
| "Drown" | 2026 | 89 | Non-album singles |
