= Rasmus Rändvee =

Estonian singer

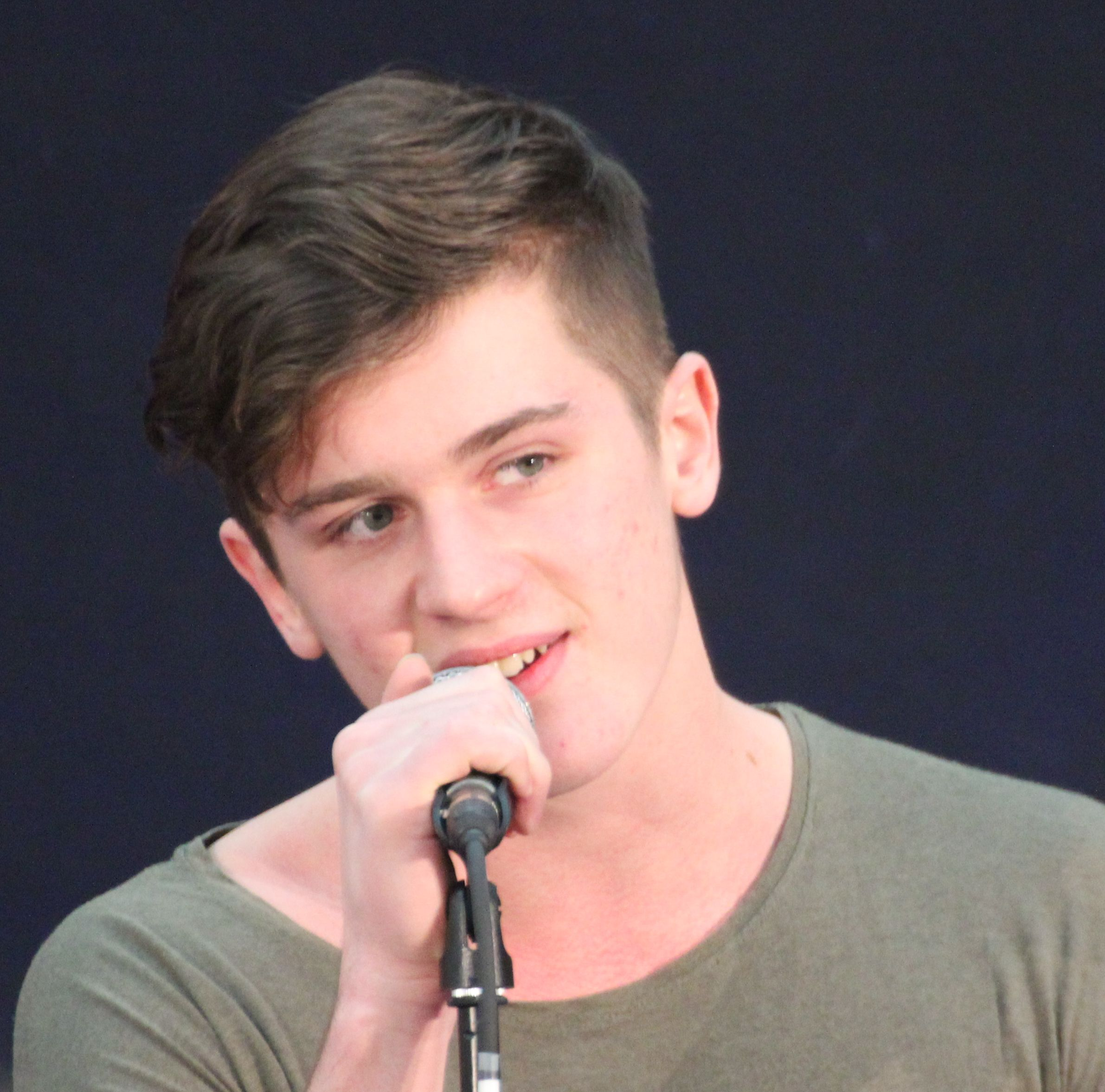
- Rändvee in 2012

Background information
- Born: Rasmus Simon Rändvee; 28 November 1995 (age 30); Pärnu, Estonia
- Genres: Alternative rock
- Years active: 2012–present
- Member of: Facelift Deer

Rasmus Simon Rändvee (born 28 November 1995 in Pärnu) is an Estonian singer. He is best known for winning the fifth season of Eesti otsib superstaari.

He attended Pärnu Gymnasium and, in 2015, graduated from the Pärnu Sütevaka Humanitarian Gymnasium.

Rändvee currently sings in the Pärnu-based band Facelift Deer and, with the band, took part in the 2013 edition of Eesti Laul, the Estonian national selection for the Eurovision Song Contest with the song Dance, and placed 7th in the final. He was also on the jury panel for voting for Estonia in the Eurovision Song Contest 2014 and 2017. On 8 November 2016, it was announced that Rändvee would participate by himself in Eesti Laul 2017 with the song This Love. On 18 February 2017, after the second semi-final, he advanced to the final and achieved third place overall.

In 2020, Rändvee returned to Eesti Laul with his song "Young". The song qualified from the semi-finals, but finished last in the grand final.

== Discography ==
=== Singles ===
- "This Love" (2016)
- "Falling in Love With You" (2018)
- "Kas süda veel lööb" (2019)
- "Young" (2019)
