= Mihkel Mattisen =

Estonian pianist and singer

Mihkel Mattisen (born 13 August 1976, in Tallinn) is an Estonian pianist, pop singer, songwriter, music producer and teacher.

He studied piano at Tallinn Music High School. From 1994 to 2000 he continued to study piano at Estonian Academy of Music and Theatre.

He is the author of the song "Et uus saaks alguse" which was sung by Birgit Õigemeel as the Estonian entry for the Eurovision Song Contest 2013.

He was a member for the band Jam (1994–2005), and for the pop-ensemble Swingers. He was a pianist in television series "Tähed muusikas" ('Stars in Music').

He started teaching at Kadrina Secondary school (Kadrina Keskkool) in September 2020.
