= Andres Kõpper =

Estonian musician and film director (born 1990)

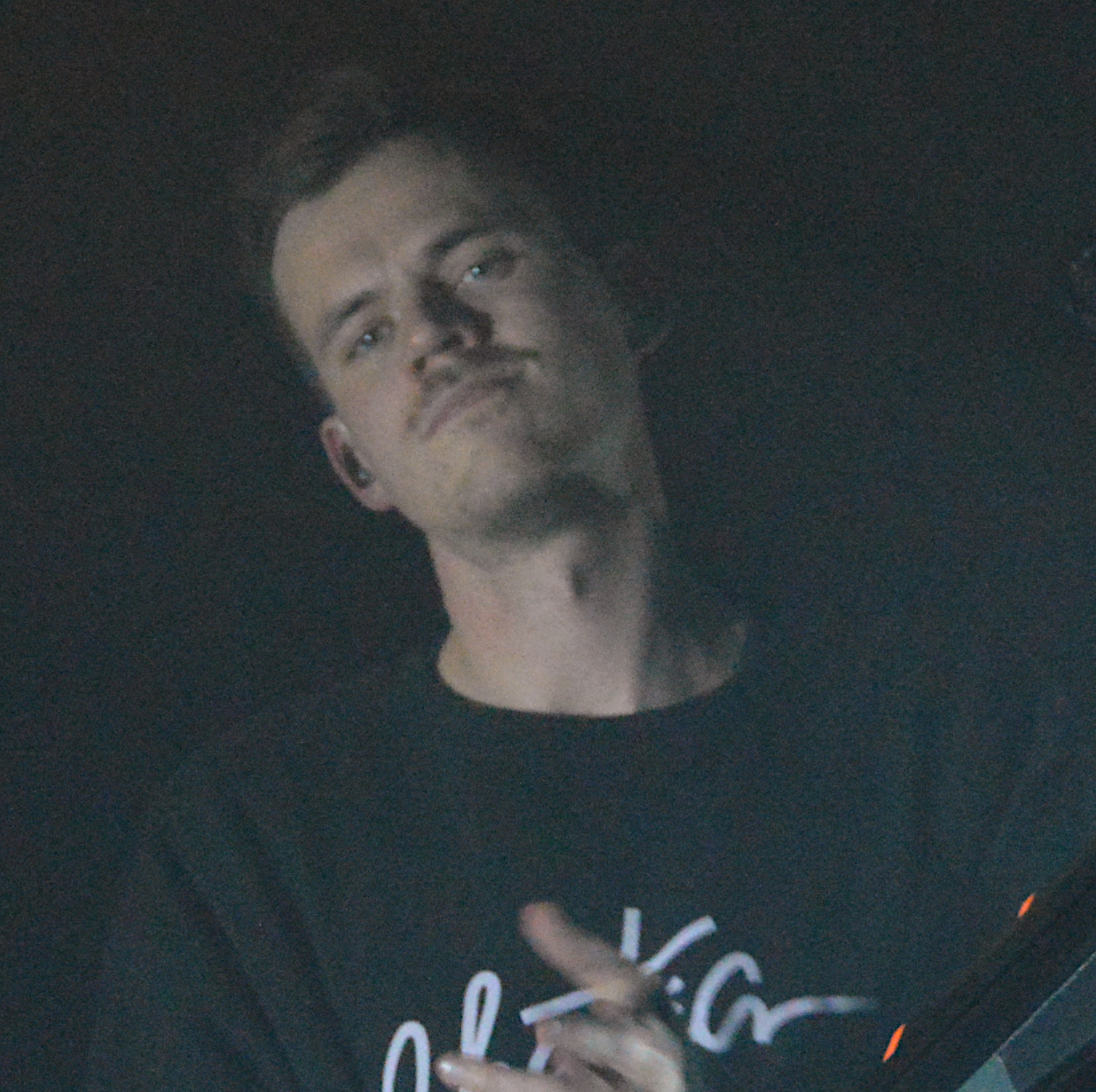
- Kõpper in 2020
- Born: 22 March 1990 (age 36); Tallinn, then part of Estonian SSR, Soviet Union
- Occupations: musician; film director; television director
- Years active: 2009–present
- Website: noepmusic.com

Andres Kõpper, known as Noëp (born on 22 March 1990) is an Estonian musician and film and television director.

He has been a member of the band Tenfold Rabbit. He has electronic music soloproject called Noëp.

He competed on Eesti Laul 2026 with the song "Days Like This". He made the superfinal and ended up as the runner-up.

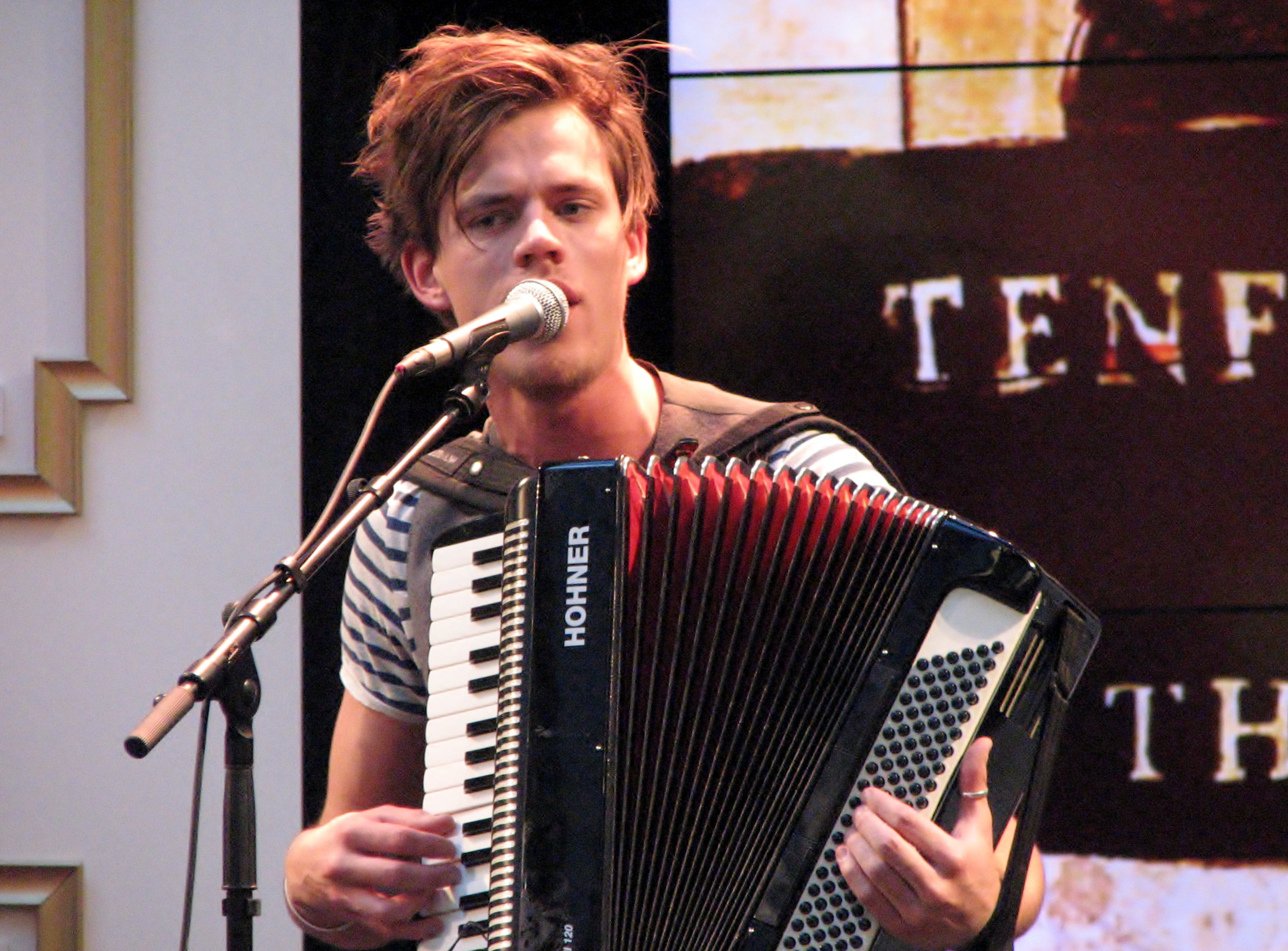
Kõpper in 2012

== Discography ==
=== Charted singles ===
==== As lead artist ====
| Title | Year | Peak chart positions | | | | | | | Certifications | Album or EP |
| Title | Year | EST | EST Dom. | EST Air. (Note: The TopHit airplay chart for Estonia began publication in January 2023. Radiomonitor data is used for the peak positions from the earlier period.) | LAT Air. | LAT Dom. Air. | LAT Stream. | LAT Dom. Stream. | Certifications | Album or EP |
|---|---|---|---|---|---|---|---|---|---|---|
| "Rihanna" | 2015 | — | 32 | — | — | X | — | X | | Non-album singles |
| "Move" | 2015 | — | 10 | 75 | — | X | — | X | | Non-album singles |
| "Golden" | 2016 | — | 17 | — | — | X | — | X | | Non-album singles |
| "Rooftop" | 2016 | — | 7 | 4 | — | X | — | X | | Non-album singles |
| "Jennifer Lawrence" | 2017 | — | 3 | 7 | — | X | — | X | | Non-album singles |
| "Mumbathoon" | 2017 | — | 23 | — | — | X | — | X | | Non-album singles |
| "San Francisco" (with Sander Mölder) | 2018 | — | 4 | — | — | X | — | X | | Non-album singles |
| "New Heights" | 2018 | 18 | 1 | 10 | — | X | — | X | | Heads In the Clouds |
| "Cold Medicine" | 2018 | — | 6 | — | — | X | — | X | | Heads In the Clouds |
| "Tangled Up" (with Liis Lemsalu) | 2018 | — | 8 | — | — | X | — | X | | Non-album singles |
| "Fk This Up" (featuring Chinchilla) | 2019 | 17 | 4 | 20 | — | X | — | X | FIMI: Gold | Non-album singles |
| "Muhu Girl" (with Sander Mölder) | 2019 | 29 | 7 | — | — | X | — | X | | Non-album singles |
| "Young Boy" | 2020 | 7 | 2 | 3 | — | X | — | X | | Non-album singles |
| "On My Way" (featuring Chinchilla) | 2020 | * | | 1 | 22 | X | — | X | | Non-album singles |
| "Days Like This" | 2025 | * | | 6 | — | X | — | X | | Non-album singles |
| "It Drives Me (Out of My Mind)" (with Sudden Lights) | 2026 | * | | 62 | 17 | 2 | 41 | 7 | | Non-album singles |
| "Full Send" (featuring Frenchgrl) | 2026 | * | | — | — | X | — | X | | WRC Rally Estonia 2026 (soundtrack) |
| "We Get Lost" (with Raul Ojamaa) | 2026 | * | | 80 | — | X | — | X | | Non-album single |
"—" denotes a recording that did not chart or was not released in that territory. "*" denotes that the chart did not exist at that time. "X" denotes that the artist was not eligible to be included on the chart.

==== As featured artist ====
| Title | Year | Peak chart positions | Album or EP |
| Title | Year | EST Dom. | Album or EP |
|---|---|---|---|
| "Speak Français" (Ellis featuring Noëp) | 2020 | 16 | Recollection Prospective |

=== Other charted songs ===
| Title | Year | Peak chart positions | Album or EP |
| Title | Year | EST Dom. | Album or EP |
|---|---|---|---|
| "Offside" (featuring Tough Love) | 2018 | 7 | Heads In the Clouds |
| "Loved the Love" | 2018 | 9 | Heads In the Clouds |
| "TV" | 2018 | 12 | Heads In the Clouds |

=== Charted remixes ===
| Title | Year | Peak chart positions | Album |
| Title | Year | EST Air. | Album |
|---|---|---|---|
| "Lausu tõtt" (Noëp Remix) (Nublu and Vaiko Eplik featuring Noëp) | 2025 | 32 | Non-album single |

== Filmography ==
Films and TV serials:

- 2012 "Nurjatud tüdrukud" (TV serial; director)
- 2012 "Bad Hair Friday" (feature film; director)
- 2015 "Restart" (TV serial; director)
