= Grete Paia =

Estonian singer and songwriter (born 1995)

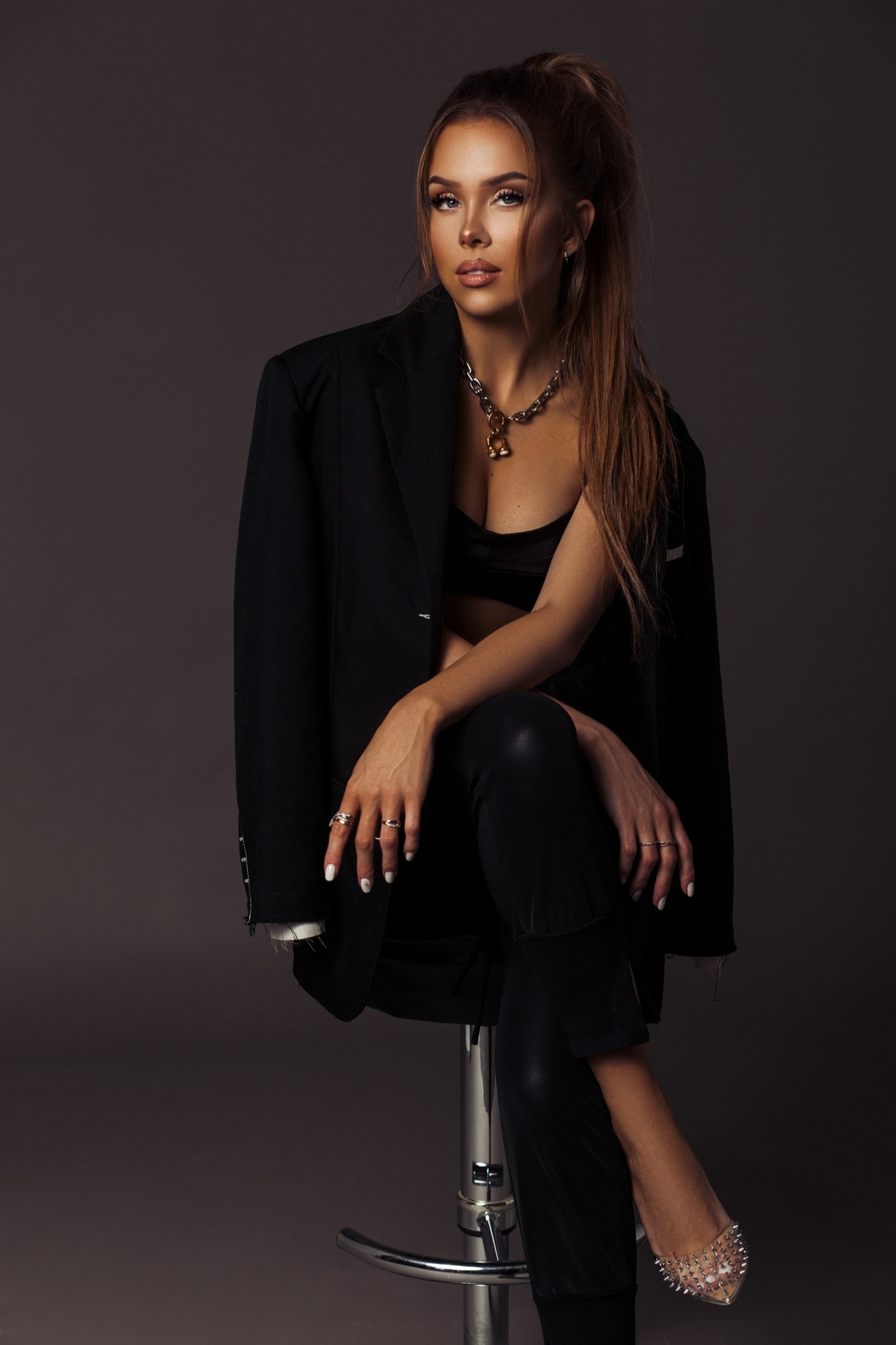
- Paia in 2023

Background information
- Born: 27 August 1995 (age 30); Kuressaare, Estonia
- Genres: Pop
- Occupations: Singer; songwriter
- Years active: 2011–present
- Label: Moonwalk

Grete Paia (born 27 August 1995) is an Estonian singer and songwriter. She is best known internationally for participating in the Eurovision Song Contest country stage competitions (Eesti Laul) in 2013, 2016, 2019, 2022, and 2026 (in 2022 in a duet with Andrei Zevakin).

== Early life ==
Grete Paia was born on 27 August 1995. She graduated from the Kuressaare Gymnasium (Kuressaare Gümnaasium).

== Career ==
On 13 December 2012, Paia was announced as one of the twenty finalists for Eesti Laul 2013 with her Estonian language song "Päästke noored hinged" (Save the souls of the young). She competed in the first semi-final, held on 16 February 2013, and performed in the seventh position. It was revealed that she was not one of the jury's five qualifiers, placing sixth out of ten, but placed first in the public vote and was able to advance to the final, ending in third place.

In the final, held on 2 March 2013, Paia performed in the final position out of ten. She placed fifth with the jury and first with the public and was able to advance to the superfinal, being one of the top two. In the superfinal, she competed against Birgit Õigemeel and her song "Et uus saaks alguse". She lost in the public vote-only superfinal and placed second behind the winner, Õigemeel.

On 5 November 2015, it was announced that Paia would return to Eesti Laul 2016 with a song called "Stories Untold". She finished 7th place in the final.

On 1 December 2018, it was announced that Paia would participate in Eesti Laul 2019 with her song "Kui isegi kaotan". The song failed to qualify, as despite it finishing in the top 6 in the semi it was not in the top 4 in the jury ranking, nor did it receive enough televotes in the second round of voting.

Paia competed in Eesti Laul 2022 as a feature artist on Andrei Zevakin's song "Mis nüüd saab".

Paia competed in Eesti Laul 2026 with the song "Taevas jäl üles".
