= List of Ma näen su häält episodes =

Television game show episode list

About the series
- Ma näen su häält is an Estonian television mystery music game show broadcast by Kanal 2, featuring its format based on the South Korean programme of the same title.
- More about the series

Episodes overview
- Total episode(s): 64
- Aired episode(s): 60
- Special episode(s): 4

The Estonian television mystery music game show Ma näen su häält (lit. 'I Can See Your Voice') has played a total of five seasons and 64 episodes; broadcasting on Kanal 2 from 27 February 2022 to 14 December 2025.

Aside from the Estonian adaptation's main programme, a follow-up postgame aftershow Ma nägin su häält (transl. I Saw Your Voice) was also aired for the second season.

== Series overview ==
Series	Episodes	Originally released		Good singers	Bad singers
Series	Episodes	First released	Last released	Good singers	Bad singers
1	12	27 February 2022	15 May 2022	10	2
2	12	18 September 2022	4 December 2022	6	6
3	12	17 September 2023	3 December 2023	9	3
4	6	22 September 2024	27 October 2024	3	3
5	6	13 April 2025	18 May 2025	3	3
6	12	21 September 2025	7 December 2025	8	4
Sp	4	22 May 2022	14 December 2025	—N/a	—N/a

== Episodes ==
=== Season 1 (2022) ===
List of season 1 episodes
No. overall	No. in season	Guest artist(s)	Player order (Note: It refers to the guest artist(s) that have played in according to their first game; returning guest artists (which also include foreigners or former good singers, with their names displaying in italics) are not counted.)	Contestants	Original release date	EST viewers (estimated count)	EST rating (national) (Note: Each episode's reception taken from Kantar Emor is recorded, based on: s1–3: The top 10 live and + VOSDAL, and top 20 consolidated rankings.; s4–6: The top 30 live + VOSDAL and consolidated (per minute and show) rankings.)
1	1	Tanel Padar	1	Henri and Enn	27 February 2022	174,000	14.8%
2	2	Anne Veski	2	Leanika and Kaitlyn	6 March 2022	192,000	16.2%
3	3	Jüri Pootsmann	3	Marge and Kristi	13 March 2022	139,000	11.8%
4	4	Koit Toome	4	Karit and Karmo	20 March 2022	158,000	13.4%
5	5	Nele-Liis Vaiksoo	5	Taavi and Jako	27 March 2022	173,000	14.6%
6	6	Silver Laas (Traffic)	6	Andra and Sander	3 April 2022	158,000	13.4%
7	7	Eda-Ines Etti	7	Daisi and Kristjan	10 April 2022	139,000	11.8%
8	8	Elina Born	8	Liisa and Silver	17 April 2022	154,000	13%
9	9	Getter Jaani	9	Jane and Monalisa	24 April 2022	155,000	13.1%
10	10	Laura Põldvere	10	Jadvi and Mireen	1 May 2022	195,000	16.5%
11	11	Ott Lepland	11	Silja and Kene	8 May 2022	149,000	12.6%
12	12	Synne Valtri	12	Anette and Ingrid	15 May 2022	193,000	16.3%

=== Season 2 (2022) ===
List of season 2 episodes
No. overall	No. in season	Guest artist(s)	Player order	Contestants	Original release date	EST viewers (estimated count)	EST rating (national)
13	1	Daniel Levi (Note: Foreign guest artists: Russia — Tanja Mihhailova-Saar; United States — Daniel Levi)	13	Marju and Nele	18 September 2022	173,000	14.6%
14	2	Reet Linna	14	Lii and Marko	25 September 2022	175,000	14.8%
15	3	Elina Nechayeva	15	Kervin and Ivor	2 October 2022	180,000	15.3%
16	4	Stefan Airapetjan	16	Loona and Marelyn-Cristin	9 October 2022	134,000	11.4%
17	5	Birgit Sarrap	17	Elary and Diana	16 October 2022	149,000	12.6%
18	6	Mihkel Raud	18	Egle and Kerro	23 October 2022	152,000	12.9%
19	7	Karl-Erik Taukar	19	Lea and Keiu	30 October 2022	165,000	14%
20	8	Lauri Liiv (Black Velvet)	20	Lauri and Natalija	6 November 2022	155,000	13.1%
21	9	Maarja-Liis Ilus	21	Maija-Leena and Karin	13 November 2022	167,000	14.2%
22	10	Taavi Immato (Shanon)	22	Sten and Getter	20 November 2022	157,000	13.3%
23	11	Kristel Aaslaid	23	Ron and Kätlin	27 November 2022	143,000	12.1%
24	12	Grete Paia	24	Kadri and Alexandra	4 December 2022	161,000	13.6%

=== Season 3 (2023) ===
List of season 3 episodes
No. overall	No. in season	Guest artist(s)	Player order	Contestants	Original release date	EST viewers (estimated count)	EST rating (national)
25	1	Liis Lemsalu	25	Kadi and Marko	17 September 2023	176,000	15.5%
26	2	Tanja Mihhailova-Saar	26	Kairi and Kai-Riin	24 September 2023	164,000	14.4%
27	3	Merlyn Uusküla	27	Mihkel Juhkam (Note: Highlights: Bad singer Mihkel Juhkam (s3 ep. 3) also returned on his 2nd game as a contestant, when he last won by performing a duet with Nele-Liis Vaiksoo for the 1st season.; New Year's Eve Concerts; The 3rd season was headlined by good singers Toomas Krall, Jaak Linnas, Margo Maltis, Raivo Oja, and Reimo Weissbach; as well as guest artists Eda-Ines Etti, Alika Milova, and Hanna-Liina Võsa.; The 4th season was headlined by good singers Loora-Eliise Kaarelson, Aavo and Annika Lumi, Silver Robin Marimäe, Keidi Niitsoo, Anti Nöör, Kalev Saarva, Maarja Sert, Anneli Snow, and Ingela Virkus; as well as guest artists Tanja Mihhailova-Saar, Koit Toome, and (panelist) Estoni Kohver (of 5miinust).; As part of its transition for then-upcoming musical variety show Minu elu viis, host Romi Hasa (s4 ep. 6) assigned as a guest panelist.) and Heret	1 October 2023	170,000	15%
28	4	Stig Rästa	28	Liis-Mariliin and Liliana-Mariana	8 October 2023	185,000	16.3%
29	5	Marju Länik	29	Jane and Annikki	15 October 2023	175,000	15.4%
30	6	Eleryn Tiit	30	Ave and Oskar	22 October 2023	171,000	15.1%
31	7	Karl Madis	31	Tiit and Roger	29 October 2023	178,000	15.6%
32	8	Eda-Ines Etti	—	Kreete and Raido	5 November 2023	198,000	17.4%
33	9	Hanna-Liina Võsa	32	Erja and Crisgel-Berit	12 November 2023	183,000	16.1%
34	10	Alika Milova	33	Sale and Kaja	19 November 2023	182,000	16%
35	11	Mihkel Mattisen	34	Sirelin and Konstantin	26 November 2023	201,000	17.7%
36	12	Jaagup Tuisk	35	Katre and Silver	3 December 2023	181,000	15.9%

=== Season 4 (2024) ===
List of season 4 episodes
No. overall	No. in season	Guest artist(s)	Player order	Contestants	Original release date	EST viewers (pm + ps, estimated count)	EST ratings (pm with share + ps, national)
37	1	Estoni Kohver (5miinust)	36	Gerly Truuväärt and Kristi Kuusmik-Orav	22 September 2024	172,000 286,000	15.3%/32% 25.5%
38	2	Inger Fridolin	37	Ken-Markus Üle and Reigo Pihlak	29 September 2024	155,000 268,000	13.8%/27% 23.9%
39	3	Tanja Mihhailova-Saar	—	Marleen Pärkma and Viivika Kadastik	6 October 2024	111,000 228,000	9.9%/30% 20.3%
40	4	Taavi Immato (Shanon)	—	Liina Rohi and Janno Palits	13 October 2024	125,000 245,000	11.1%/41% 21.8%
41	5	Ott Lepland	—	Ruth Pukman and Pille Kerner	20 October 2024	124,000 254,000	11%/33% 22.6%
42	6	Koit Toome	—	Rene Tikk and Lea Jaanimaa	27 October 2024	129,000 245,000	11.5%/36% 21.8%

=== Season 5 (2025) ===
List of season 5 episodes
No. overall	No. in season	Guest artist(s)	Player order	Contestants	Original release date	EST viewers (pm + ps, estimated count)	EST ratings (pm with share + ps, national)
43	1	Karl Killing	38	Rasmus Voolaid and Mart Treial	13 April 2025	131,000 267,000	11.7%/37% 23.8%
44	2	Ott Lepland	—	Tiina and Kadly Künnap	20 April 2025	113,000 243,000	10.1%/31% 21.7%
45	3	Birgit Sarrap	—	Anneli and Rainer Leppik	27 April 2025	103,000 200,000	9.1%/36% 17.8%
46	4	Koit Toome	—	Ketty and Florika	4 May 2025	112,000 239,000	10%/34% 21.3%
47	5	Elina Born	—	Mehis Pärn and Tiina Jacobi	11 May 2025	133,000 233,000	11.9%/25% 20.8%
48	6	An-Marlen	39	Virve Soeson and Kristjan Kriss	18 May 2025	132,000 223,000	11.8%/21% 19.9%

=== Season 6 (2025) ===
List of season 6 episodes
No. overall	No. in season	Guest artist(s)	Player order	Contestants	Original release date	EST viewers (pm + ps, estimated count)	EST ratings (pm with share + ps, national)
49	1	Dagmar Oja	50	Raila and Franka	21 September 2025	106,000 207,000	9.7%/37% 18.9%
50	2	Hanna-Liina Võsa	—	Sille and Ingela Kaljuste	28 September 2025	126,000 205,000	11.5%/30% 18.7%
51	3	Villemdrillem	51	Rain and Kristina Jakobson	5 October 2025	88,000 191,000	8%/42% 17.4%
52	4	Birgit Sarrap	—	Eva Reis and Maria Pulla	12 October 2025	85,000 189,000	7.8%/39% 17.3%
53	5	Getter Jaani	—	Karis and Andres	19 October 2025 (Note: Despite being not preempted, this episode was also aired during Kanal 2's special coverage of the 2025 Estonian municipal elections.)	77,000 161,000	7.1%/37% 14.7%
54	6	Säm	52	Märten and Erika	26 October 2025	87,000 190,000	8%/34% 17.4%
55	7	Lauri Liiv (Black Velvet)	—	Miki-Peep Soopere and Priit	2 November 2025	97,000 189,000	8.8%/33% 17.3%
56	8	Marianne Leibur	53	Raido and Kaarel	9 November 2025	90,000 186,000	8.2%/37% 16.9%
57	9	Reigo Tamm	54	Marko and Signe	16 November 2025	94,000 183,000	8.6%/36% 16.7%
58	10	Tanja Mihhailova-Saar	—	Mari-Liis and Kairi	23 November 2025	79,000 181,000	7.2%/35% 16.5%
59	11	Kristel Aaslaid	—	Johannes and Marleen	30 November 2025	113,000 203,000	10.3%/23% 18.6%
60	12	Stefan Airapetjan	55	Karin Käbi Kuus and Heleriin	7 December 2025	82,000 171,000	7.5%/41% 15.6%

== Specials ==
List of special episodes
No.	Title	Original release date	EST viewers (pm + ps, estimated count)	EST ratings (pm with share + ps, national)
1	"Suurimad üllatused (Biggest Surprises)"	22 May 2022	114,000	9.7%
2	"Ma ei näinud su häält (I Didn't See Your Voice) — 2024 New Year's Countdown edition"	31 December 2023	106,000	9.3%
3	"Ma ei näinud su häält (I Didn't See Your Voice) — 2025 New Year's Countdown edition"	31 December 2024	NR	NR
4	"Ma ei näinud su häält (I Didn't See Your Voice) — Holiday postseason showcase"	14 December 2025	76,000 144,000	6.9%/21% 13.1%
