= Ma näen su häält season 3 =

Television game show season

Ma näen su häält
- Season 3
- Starring: Estoni Kohver (5miinust); Grete Kuld; Evelin Võigemast; Andrei Zevakin
- Hosted by: Piret Laos
- Winners: Good singers: 9; Bad singers: 3
- No. of episodes: Regular: 12; Special: 1; Overall: 13

Release
- Original network: Kanal 2
- Original release: Regular season: 17 September – 3 December 2023; Special: 31 December 2023

Season chronology
- ← Previous; Season 2 Next → Season 4

The third season of the Estonian television mystery music game show Ma näen su häält premiered on Kanal 2 on 17 September 2023.

== Gameplay ==
=== Format ===
According to the original South Korean rules, the guest artist and contestants must attempt to eliminate bad singers during its game phase. At the final performance, the last remaining mystery singer is revealed as either good or bad by means of a duet between them and one of the guest artists.

If the last remaining mystery singer is good, the contestants win €2,023; this is also applied to the winning bad singer selected by them.

=== Rounds ===
1. First impression (Estonian: Esimene mulje)
  The guest artist and contestants are given some time to observe and examine each mystery singer based on their appearance.
2. Moving the mouth (Estonian: Suu liigutamine)
  Each mystery singer performs a lip sync to a song; good singers mime to a recording of their own, while bad singers mime to a backing track by another vocalist.
3. Home video (Estonian: Koduvideo)
  The guest artist and contestants are presented with a video package containing possible clues by one of the mystery singers.
4. Cross-examination (Estonian: Ristküsitlus)
  The guest artist and contestants may ask questions to the remaining mystery singers. Good singers are required to give truthful responses, while the bad singers must lie.

== Episodes ==
=== Guest artists ===
Legend:
Good singer
Bad singer
— The contestants won the money.
— The winning bad singer stole the money.

Episode		Guest artist (Note: Players' notes: For the returning guest artists (who also include foreigners and former good singers), names are displayed in italics.; For the mixed groups, names who identified as bad singers are displayed in italics.)	Contestants	Mystery singers (In their respective numbers and aliases)						
#	Date	Guest artist	Contestants	Elimination order						Winner
#	Date	Guest artist	Contestants	First impression	Moving the mouth		Home video		Cross-examination	Winner
1	17 September 2023	Liis Lemsalu	Kadi and Marko → €2,023	2. Olari Pint; (Kickboxer)	4. Ave Oja; (Gourmand)	6. Heily Leola; (Investigator)	7. Mari Ronimois; (Reiki Therapist)	3. Ester Tommingas; (Military Adventurer)	1. Andres Leima; (Car Racer)	5. Raivo Oja; Hunter
2	24 September 2023	Tanja Mihhailova-Saar (Note: Season highlights: Foreign guest artist: Tanja Mihhailova-Saar (RUS; ep. 2); Bad singer Mihkel Juhkam (ep. 3) also returned on his 2nd game as a contestant, when he last won by performing a duet with Nele-Liis Vaiksoo for the 1st season.)	Kairi and Kai-Riin → €2,023	5. Marko Õim; (Bus Driver)	2. Oliver Povel; (Heavy Metal Fan)	4. Richard Sepajõe; (Singer-Songwriter)	6. Mariana Kukk; (Robotics Student)	7. Monika Põld; (Dog Trainer)	1. Meelis Vilippus; (Colonel Lieutenant)	3. Maiki Kudinova; Tour Guide
3	1 October 2023	Merlyn Uusküla	Mihkel Juhkam and Heret → €2,023	2. (Geocacher)	3. Erle Kiis; (Taxi Driver)	5. Rasmus Juhanson; (Training Wolf)	7. Andres Abro; (Bartender)	1. Lisett Kulmats; (Model)	6. Tagne Tähe; (Kitesurfer)	4. Madli Ainsalu; Trekker
4	8 October 2023	Stig Rästa	Liis-Mariliin and Liliana-Mariana → €2,023	7. Kaidi Sööt; (Music Teacher)	2. Toivo Teder; (Folk Musician)	4. Steven Eric Velleõu; (Rapper)	5. (Rising Star)	3. Kadi Kõiv; (Country Fan)	6. Mati Oolo; (Pianist)	1. Kristiina Renser; Cabaret Artist
5	15 October 2023	Marju Länik	Jane and Annikki → €0	7. Jan-Mattias Kottise; (Car Racer)	2. Anto Õnnis; (Cross Country Skier)	3. Emmanuel Testimony Odeh; (Footballer)	5. (Cyclist)	4. (Influencer)	1. Maarja Sikk; (Princess Charming)	6. Hanna Tamm; Bride
6	22 October 2023	Eleryn Tiit	Ave and Oskar → €2,023	6. Maria Toodo; (Ice Cream Vendor)	1. Kirtty Magnus; (Sunday Jockey)	3. Sirje Ojasaar; (Theatre Lover)	5. (Truck Driver)	4. (Seaman)	2. Rein Kontson; (Carpenter)	7. Marianne Juhkam; Garbage Collector
7	29 October 2023	Karl Madis	Tiit and Roger → €2,023	3. Teele Mõistlik; (Bride Mother)	1. Lizett Käst; (The Rose)	5. Nora Peri; (Snowboarder)	7. Reimo Weissbach; (Basketball Player)	4. (Forklift Driver)	6. (Bookkeeper)	2. Sirelin Jürgens; Babysitter
8	5 November 2023	Eda-Ines Etti	Kreete and Raido → €0	7. (Plumber)	5. (Jet Skier)	3. Joanna Jürimäe; (Interior Designer)	1. (Handball Player)	2. Jaak Linnas; (Businessman)	4. (Mountain Biker)	6. Laura-Elisabeth Kütt; Fashion Designer
9	12 November 2023	Hanna-Liina Võsa	Erja and Crisgel-Berit → €2,023	2. Mihkel Palk; (Young Politician)	1. Grete Reinsalu; (Pattisier)	5. Marko Venno; (Assistant Policeman)	6. Toomas Krall; (Sound Engineer)	7. Asja Krištofor; (Events Organiser)	4. Silver Lumi; (Mathematician)	3. Anett Tamm; Songwriter
10	19 November 2023	Alika Milova	Sale and Kaja → €2,023	4. Annika Leies; (Canine Athlete)	1. Margo Maltis; (Yogi)	6. (Older Sister)	7. (Angler)	2. Doris Randma; (Birth Attendant)	5. Ruber Veliz; (Artist)	3. Maarja Prisko; Seawoman
11	26 November 2023	Mihkel Mattisen	Sirelin and Konstantin → €2,023	7. Ragnar Huoponen; (Basketball Player)	1. Liis Õunpuu; (Sweetheart)	3. Robert Kruuda; (Veterinarian)	4. Kaur Erik Pääsuke; (Card Shark)	5. Teele Saar; (Ambulance Nurse)	2. Toivo Kaazonen; (Grandfather)	6. Artti Vain; Medical Student
12	3 December 2023	Jaagup Tuisk	Katre and Silver → €0	2. Erkki Kollom; (Window Cleaner)	3. Helena Virt; (Laboratory Technician)	6. Margus Kägu; (Private Tutor)	7. Robin Pastak; (Landscape Designer)	4. Kadi Sööt; (Mushroom Farmer)	1. Kaidi Soosaar; (Snake Charmer)	5. Airi Salumaa; Island Maiden

=== Panelists ===
Legend:
Regular panelist
Guest panelist

Apps		Panelists in attendance (Sorted by first appearance, with episode designations)
g#	p#	Panelists in attendance (Sorted by first appearance, with episode designations)
12	1	Grete Kuld (1–12)
10	1	Evelin Võigemast (1–2, 5–12)
9	1	Andrei Zevakin (1–4, 6–7, 9–11); Estoni Kohver (5miinust) (1–4, 6–8, 10, 12)
4	1	Franz Malmsten, Jr. (4–5, 9, 11)
3	1	Mart Juur (3, 5, 8)
1	1	Jüri Butšakov (12)

== Postseason Showcase (31 December 2023) ==
Also in this season, a first postseason showcase (subtitled Ma ei näinud su häält, English: I Didn't See Your Voice) was aired on the last day of 2023. It featured non-televised duet performances by guest artists Eda-Ines Etti, Alika Milova, and Hanna-Liina Võsa; as well as an encore concert headlined by good singers Toomas Krall, Jaak Linnas, Margo Maltis, Raivo Oja, and Reimo Weissbach.

== Reception ==
Legend:
Highest rated episode
Lowest rated episode

No.	Title	Air date	Timeslot (EET)	Live			Live + VOSDAL			Consolidated		
No.	Title	Air date	Timeslot (EET)	Rank	Points	Total	Rank	Points	Total	Rank	Points	Total
1	"Liis Lemsalu"	17 September 2023	Sunday, 20:05	2	11.1%	126,000	1	13.5%	153,000	1	15.5%	176,000
2	"Tanja Mihhailova-Saar"	24 September 2023	Sunday, 20:05	3	10%	114,000	3	13%	148,000	2	14.4%	164,000
3	"Merlyn Uusküla"	1 October 2023	Sunday, 20:05	3	10.9%	123,000	2	13.6%	154,000	2	15%	170,000
4	"Stig Rästa"	8 October 2023	Sunday, 20:05	2	11.8%	134,000	1	15%	170,000	1	16.3%	185,000
5	"Marju Länik"	15 October 2023	Sunday, 20:05	2	12.1%	138,000	2	14.3%	162,000	2	15.4%	175,000
6	"Eleryn Tiit"	22 October 2023	Sunday, 20:05	3	11.7%	133,000	2	14%	159,000	2	15.1%	171,000
7	"Karl Madis"	29 October 2023	Sunday, 20:05	5	11.2%	127,000	3	13.5%	154,000	2	15.6%	178,000
8	"Eda-Ines Etti"	5 November 2023	Sunday, 20:05	1	13.5%	153,000	1	16.3%	185,000	1	17.4%	198,000
9	"Hanna-Liina Võsa"	12 November 2023	Sunday, 20:05	2	12.1%	137,000	1	14.6%	166,000	2	16.1%	183,000
10	"Alika Milova"	19 November 2023	Sunday, 20:05	3	12.1%	138,000	3	14.6%	166,000	2	16%	182,000
11	"Mihkel Mattisen"	26 November 2023	Sunday, 20:05	1	14.1%	160,000	1	16.9%	192,000	1	17.7%	201,000
12	"Jaagup Tuisk"	3 December 2023	Sunday, 20:05	2	12.6%	143,000	2	14.9%	169,000	2	15.9%	181,000
Special	"I Didn't See Your Voice"	31 December 2023	Sunday, 20:00	Not reported						19	9.3%	106,000

Source: Kantar Emor
