= Ma näen su häält season 4 =

Television game show season

Ma näen su häält
- Season 4
- Starring: Kristel Aaslaid; Estoni Kohver (5miinust); Tõnis Niinemets; Evelin Võigemast
- Hosted by: Piret Laos
- Winners: Good singers: 3; Bad singers: 3
- No. of episodes: Regular: 6; Special: 1; Overall: 7

Release
- Original network: Kanal 2
- Original release: Regular season: 22 September – 27 October 2024; Special: 31 December 2024

Season chronology
- ← Previous; Season 3 Next → Season 5

The fourth season of the Estonian television mystery music game show Ma näen su häält premiered on Kanal 2 on 22 September 2024.

== Gameplay ==
=== Format ===
According to the original South Korean rules, the guest artist and contestants must attempt to eliminate bad singers during its game phase. At the final performance, the last remaining mystery singer is revealed as either good or bad by means of a duet between them and one of the guest artists.

If the last remaining mystery singer is good, the contestants win €2,024; this is also applied to the winning bad singer selected by them.

=== Rounds ===
1. TBA (Estonian: TBA)

== Episodes ==
=== Guest artists ===
Legend:
Good singer
Bad singer
— The contestants won the money.
— The winning bad singer stole the money.

Episode		Guest artist (Note: Players' notes: For the returning guest artists (who also include foreigners and former good singers), names are displayed in italics.; For the mixed groups, names who identified as bad singers are displayed in italics.)	Contestants	Mystery singers (In their respective numbers and aliases)						
#	Date	Guest artist	Contestants	Elimination order						Winner
#	Date	Guest artist	Contestants	TBA						Winner
1	22 September 2024	Estoni Kohver (5miinust)	Gerly Truuväärt and Kristi Kuusmik-Orav → €0	6. Kristofer Reintamm; (Party Fox)	1. Loora-Eliise Kaarelson; (Anna of Arendelle)	2. Lea Pesor; (Face Painter)	5. Ingela Virkus; (Acrobat)	4. Joonas Peensalu; (Rallyist)	3. Anti Nöör; (Chimney Sweep)	7. Kristjan Masing; Snooker Player
2	29 September 2024	Inger Fridolin	Ken-Markus Üle and Reigo Pihlak → €2,024	5. Jaak Liiva; (Detective Wolf)	2. Kaie Kuuler; (Hatter)	3. Anneli Snow; (Psychic)	6. Ave Kütt; (Flower Fairy)	4. Aare Kodasma; (Woodcarver)	7. Kairit Sepp; (Party Singer)	1. Silver Robin Marimäe; Cameraman Kõps
3	6 October 2024	Tanja Mihhailova-Saar (Note: Season highlights: Foreign guest artist: Tanja Mihhailova-Saar (RUS; ep. 3); As part of its transition for then-upcoming musical variety show Minu elu viis, host Romi Hasa (ep. 6) assigned as a guest panelist.)	Marleen Pärkma and Viivika Kadastik → €0	4. Berit Rebane; (Cat Sitter)	7. Kaarel Kärg; (Firefighter)	3. Kelly Kaasik; (Shapeshifter)	6. Ando Temmo Tormi; (Swing Dancer)	5. Mirell Ruus; (Hiker)	1. Keidi Niitsoo; (Crocheter)	2. Kristiina Peedo; Tattoo Artist
4	13 October 2024	Taavi Immato (Shanon)	Liina Rohi and Janno Palits → €2,024	5. Peeter Thomson; (Pastel Artist)	4. Kristel Konsa; (Adventurer)	1. Kalev Saarva; (Welder)	7. Erik-Enno Rand; (Winger)	3. Oskar Arikainen; (Karaoke Addict)	2. Anette-Grete Tumanov; (Cheerleader)	6. Rasmus Kalep; Sailor
5	20 October 2024	Ott Lepland	Ruth Pukman and Pille Kerner → €2,024	7. Hille Meister-Roslender; (Masseur)	1. Annika Lumi; (Miss Christmas)	6. Urmas Verzibikovs; (Forester)	4. Valdek Kikkas; (Summer Guy)	5. Lauri Laam; (Schoolboy)	2. Sirle Erimäe; (Hunter)	3. Aavo Lumi; Supervisory Officer
6	27 October 2024	Koit Toome	Rene Tikk and Lea Jaanimaa → €0	5. Eva-Liis Timmusk; (Software Tester)	7. Maarja Sert; (Female Footballer)	2. Triinliis Hordo; (P.E. Teacher)	1. Eglyd Esken; (Midwife)	4. Elizabeth Meedla; (Retro Girl)	3. Agne-Andra Aasmaa; (Diarist)	6. Tuuli Jentson; Family Nurse

=== Panelists ===
Legend:
Regular panelist
Guest panelist

Apps		Panelists in attendance (Sorted by first appearance, with episode designations)
g#	p#	Panelists in attendance (Sorted by first appearance, with episode designations)
6	2	Kristel Aaslaid and Evelin Võigemast (1–6)
5	1	Estoni Kohver (5miinust) (2–6)
4	1	Tõnis Niinemets (1–3, 5)
2	1	Mart Juur (1–2)
1	2	Robert Rool (4); Romi Hasa (6)

== Postseason Showcase (31 December 2024) ==
Also in this season, a second postseason showcase (subtitled Ma ei näinud su häält, English: I Didn't See Your Voice) was aired on the last day of 2024, featuring an encore concert headlined by good singers Loora-Eliise Kaarelson, Aavo and Annika Lumi, Silver Robin Marimäe, Keidi Niitsoo, Anti Nöör, Kalev Saarva, Maarja Sert, Anneli Snow, and Ingela Virkus; Tanja Mihhailova-Saar, Koit Toome, and Estoni Kohver (of 5miinust) made their guesting appearances.

== Reception ==
Legend:
Highest rated episode
Lowest rated episode

No.	Title	Air date	Timeslot (EET)	Live + VOSDAL			Consolidated					
No.	Title	Air date	Timeslot (EET)	Live + VOSDAL			Rank	Per minute			Per show	
No.	Title	Air date	Timeslot (EET)	Rank	Points	Total	Rank	Points	Share	Total	Points	Total
1	"Estoni Kohver"	22 September 2024	Sunday, 20:05	2	12.9%	145,000	2	15.3%	32%	172,000	25.5%	286,000
2	"Inger Fridolin"	29 September 2024	Sunday, 20:05	2	12.7%	142,000	2	13.8%	27%	155,000	23.9%	268,000
3	"Tanja Mihhailova-Saar"	6 October 2024	Sunday, 20:05	10–11	8%	90,000	5	9.9%	30%	111,000	20.3%	228,000
4	"Taavi Immato"	13 October 2024	Sunday, 20:05	10	8.7%	98,000	4	11.1%	41%	125,000	21.8%	245,000
5	"Ott Lepland"	20 October 2024	Sunday, 20:05	8	8.9%	100,000	5	11%	33%	124,000	22.6%	254,000
6	"Koit Toome"	27 October 2024	Sunday, 20:05	5	9.8%	109,000	4	11.5%	36%	129,000	21.8%	245,000
Special	"I Didn't See Your Voice"	31 December 2024	Tuesday, 20:30	Not reported								

Source: Kantar Emor
