= Ma näen su häält season 2 =

Television game show season

Ma näen su häält
- Season 2
- Starring: Grete Kuld; Tõnis Niinemets; Evelin Võigemast; Andrei Zevakin
- Hosted by: Piret Laos
- Winners: Good singers: 6; Bad singers: 6
- Companion show: Ma nägin su häält (postgame aftershow)
- No. of episodes: 12

Release
- Original network: Kanal 2
- Original release: 18 September – 4 December 2022

Season chronology
- ← Previous; Season 1 Next → Season 3

The second season of the Estonian television mystery music game show Ma näen su häält premiered on Kanal 2 on 18 September 2022.

== Gameplay ==
=== Format ===
According to the original South Korean rules, the guest artist and contestants must attempt to eliminate bad singers during its game phase. At the final performance, the last remaining mystery singer is revealed as either good or bad by means of a duet between them and one of the guest artists.

If the last remaining mystery singer is good, the contestants win €2,022; this is also applied to the winning bad singer selected by them.

=== Rounds ===
1. First impression (Estonian: Esimene mulje)
  The guest artist and contestants are given some time to observe and examine each mystery singer based on their appearance.
2. Moving the mouth (Estonian: Suu liigutamine)
  Each mystery singer performs a lip sync to a song; good singers mime to a recording of their own, while bad singers mime to a backing track by another vocalist.
3. Home video (Estonian: Koduvideo)
  The guest artist and contestants are presented with a video package containing possible clues by one of the mystery singers.
4. Cross-examination (Estonian: Ristküsitlus)
  The guest artist and contestants may ask questions to the remaining mystery singers. Good singers are required to give truthful responses, while the bad singers must lie.

== Episodes ==
=== Guest artists ===
Legend:
Good singer
Bad singer
— The contestants won the money.
— The winning bad singer stole the money.

Episode		Guest artist (Note: Players' notes: For the returning guest artists (who also include foreigners and former good singers), names are displayed in italics.; For the mixed groups, names who identified as bad singers are displayed in italics.)	Contestants	Mystery singers (In their respective numbers and aliases)						
#	Date	Guest artist	Contestants	Elimination order						Winner
#	Date	Guest artist	Contestants	First impression	Moving the mouth		Home video		Cross-examination	Winner
1	18 September 2022	Daniel Levi (Note: Season highlight: Foreign guest artist: Daniel Levi (USA; ep. 2))	Marju and Nele → €0	5. Marylin Tilga; (Beyonce Fan)	3. Margit Kooser; (Philologist)	4. Veikko Siitam; (Electrician)	7. Margus Kobing; (Deer Herder)	1. Wang Yixuan; (Tastemaker)	6. Kene Viljak; (Rally Referee)	2. Liisbeth Horn; Food Courier
2	25 September 2022	Reet Linna	Lii and Marko → €2,022	7. Merili Otsma; (Fashion Enthusiast)	1. Urmas Persidski; (School Dad)	3. Martin Luup; (Electric Linesman)	5. Kaspar Pokk; (Videographer)	4. Kerli Metsis; (Roller Skater)	6. Sanna Sööt; (TikToker)	2. Kärt Leppik; Young Scientist
3	2 October 2022	Elina Nechayeva	Kervin and Ivor → €2,022	3. Carolyna Puiste; (Songbird)	1. Kristian Muldre; (Gasoline Boy)	5. Maria Mandre; (Equestrienne)	6. Anna Dõtõna; (Mafia Fan)	2. Kadri Leping; (Personal Developer)	4. Leonid Maznitsa; (Chess Player)	7. Maurizio D'Agapito; Business Consultant
4	9 October 2022	Stefan Airapetjan	Loona and Marelyn-Cristin → €0	1. Urmo Kütismaa; (Furniture Maker)	2. Helge Hartmann; (Record Spinner)	5. Getter Inessa; (Smoothie Master)	7. Maret Palusalu; (Public Servant)	6. (Speed Skater)	3. Grete-Liis Oja; (Grimm's Wizard)	4. Veiko Saago; Orienteer
5	16 October 2022	Birgit Sarrap	Elary and Diana → €2,022	1. Maili Vaarpu; (Hiker)	2. Marta Lotta Kukk; (Winter Swimmer)	6. Vilita; (Drag Queen)	7. (Telemarketer)	5. Marika Loderaud; (Clown)	4. Ant Nurhan; (Minimalist)	3. Mariah-Theresa Turbel; Barista
6	23 October 2022	Mihkel Raud	Egle and Kerro → €0	7. Vitaly Dudkin; (Cyclist)	1. Dagmar Õunap; (Boxer)	3. Kaarel Telgmaa; (Sales Manager)	5. (Pasta Lover)	6. Aiky Öövel; (Social Pedagogue)	2. Ranno Tamm; (Ice Cream Addict)	4. Kerttu Lepik; Activist
7	30 October 2022	Karl-Erik Taukar	Lea and Keiu → €0	4. Elina Vatsfeldt; (Auto Mechanic)	3. Eva-Britta Simson; (Nanny)	6. Jaagup Tuisk; (Nude Model)	7. Margrit Kits; (Pärnu Native)	5. Viktoria Borgmann; (Beauty Queen)	2. Oliver Timmusk; (Sauna Guy)	1. Kaisa Schmidt; Dentist
8	6 November 2022	Lauri Liiv (Black Velvet)	Lauri and Natalija → €2,022	7. (Intensive Care Unit)	2. Sergei Kuznetsov; (Merchant)	3. Dagmar Lukan; (Ecologist)	5. Margot Suur; (Aroma Gourmet)	6. Juhan Pärna; (Music Lover)	1. Marge Kesküla; (Drifter)	4. Ranele Raudsoo; Citizen
9	13 November 2022	Maarja-Liis Ilus	Maija-Leena and Karin → €0	3. Raily Rammi; (Mascara Technician)	1. Andri Võsokovski; (Dinner Guide)	4. Mart Luhari; (Wildlife Genius)	6. Sarah Nehari; (High School Graduate)	5. Erkki Sillaots; (Finnish-Estonian)	7. Tanel Lassik; (Moneywise)	2. Anita Vahter; Karaoke Ace
10	20 November 2022	Taavi Immato (Shanon)	Sten and Getter → €0	2. Eve Pärnsalu; (Golfer)	3. (Firefighter)	5. Elise Pani; (Illustrator)	7. Maria Kondratjeva; (Opera Singer)	4. Eva Jänes; (Space Fanatic)	6. Jarmo Seljamaa; (Substitute Teacher)	1. Regiina Vendla; Hairdresser
11	27 November 2022	Kristel Aaslaid	Ron and Kätlin → €2,022	5. Anni Õnneleid; (Nanny)	1. Reven Köster; (Construction Worker)	2. Kaari Kattai; (Dog Lover)	7. Ida Adele Raneli Ruul; (Hobbyist)	6. Eero Neeme; (Horse Trainer)	3. Peeter Priks; (Skier)	4. Anastasia Poddubko; Manicurist
12	4 December 2022	Grete Paia	Kadri and Alexandra → €2,022	1. Janek Sumberg; (Runner)	2. Anna Siitan; (World Savior)	5. Keiti Loim; (Bodybuilder)	7. Chrislin Metsanurm; (Pistol Journalist)	3. Elina Martinson; (Fitness Diva)	4. Madis Ader; (Hip-hop Dancer)	6. Kristjan Karmo; Lecturer

=== Panelists ===
Legend:
Regular panelist
Additional panelist
Guest panelist

Apps		Panelists in attendance (Sorted by first appearance, with episode designations)
g#	p#	Panelists in attendance (Sorted by first appearance, with episode designations)
12	2	Grete Kuld and Evelin Võigemast (1–12)
11	1	Tõnis Niinemets (1–10, 12)
6	1	Andrei Zevakin (1–5, 11)
4	1	Mart Juur (7–8, 10–11)
3	1	Estoni Kohver (5miinust) (6, 9, 12)

== Reception ==
Legend:
Highest rated episode
Lowest rated episode

No.	Title	Air date	Timeslot (EET)	Live			Live + VOSDAL			Consolidated		
No.	Title	Air date	Timeslot (EET)	Rank	Points	Total	Rank	Points	Total	Rank	Points	Total
1	"Daniel Levi"	18 September 2022	Sunday, 20:05	3	10.9%	129,000	3	13.1%	155,000	2	14.6%	173,000
2	"Reet Linna"	25 September 2022	Sunday, 20:05	3	11.1%	131,000	3	13.6%	161,000	2	14.8%	175,000
3	"Elina Nechayeva"	2 October 2022	Sunday, 20:05	2	11.5%	135,000	2	13.7%	162,000	1	15.3%	180,000
4	"Stefan Airapetjan"	9 October 2022	Sunday, 20:05	Not reported			7	9.9%	117,000	5	11.4%	134,000
5	"Birgit Sarrap"	16 October 2022	Sunday, 20:05	Not reported			6	11.1%	131,000	5	12.6%	149,000
6	"Mihkel Raud"	23 October 2022	Sunday, 20:05	5	9.1%	108,000	5	11%	129,000	4	12.9%	152,000
7	"Karl-Erik Taukar"	30 October 2022	Sunday, 20:05	5	9.6%	113,000	4	12.1%	143,000	3	14%	165,000
8	"Lauri Liiv"	6 November 2022	Sunday, 20:05	9	8.3%	98,000	7	10.5%	124,000	3	13.1%	155,000
9	"Maarja-Liis Ilus"	13 November 2022	Sunday, 20:05	5	9%	106,000	4	12.1%	143,000	2	14.2%	167,000
10	"Taavi Immato"	20 November 2022	Sunday, 20:05	7	8.8%	104,000	7	11.4%	134,000	2	13.3%	157,000
11	"Kristel Aaslaid"	27 November 2022	Sunday, 20:05	10	7.8%	93,000	6	10.3%	121,000	2	12.1%	143,000
12	"Grete Paia"	4 December 2022	Sunday, 20:05	3	9.8%	116,000	2	12.5%	148,000	2	13.6%	161,000

Source: Kantar Emor
