= Inger =

Inger may refer to:

== People ==
- Inger (given name), list of people with the given name
- Inger (surname), list of people with the surname
- Inger, the main character of Hans Christian Andersen's fairy tale The Girl Who Trod on a Loaf
- INGER, the stage name of Estonian singer Inger Fridolin

== Other uses ==
- Inger, Minnesota, United States, an unincorporated community and census-designated place
- Izhora River, also known as the Inger River, a tributary of the Neva River in Russia
- SS Inger (1930), a cargo ship torpedoed and sunk by a German U-boat in World War II; see List of shipwrecks in August 1941 (23 August)
