= Ma näen su häält season 6 =

Television game show season

Ma näen su häält
- Season 6
- Starring: Mart Juur; Korea (5miinust); Tõnis Niinemets; Eleryn Tiit; Evelin Võigemast
- Hosted by: Piret Laos
- Winners: Good singers: 8; Bad singers: 4
- No. of episodes: Regular: 12; Special: 1; Overall: 13

Release
- Original network: Kanal 2
- Original release: 21 September – 14 December 2025

Additional information
- Filming dates: Phase 1: 30 August – 31 August 2025; Phase 2: 27 October – 28 October 2025

Season chronology
- ← Previous; Season 5

The sixth season of the Estonian television mystery music game show Ma näen su häält premiered on Kanal 2 on 21 September 2025.

== Gameplay ==
=== Format ===
According to the original South Korean rules, the guest artist and contestants must attempt to eliminate bad singers during its game phase. At the final performance, the last remaining mystery singer is revealed as either good or bad by means of a duet between them and one of the guest artists.

If the last remaining mystery singer is good, the contestants win €2,025; this is also applied to the winning bad singer selected by them.

=== Rounds ===
1. Sound studio (Estonian: Helistuudio)
  A video recording from a studio session by one of the remaining mystery singers reveal only 0.3 seconds of their singing voice as an additional hint.

== Episodes ==
=== Guest artists ===
Legend:
Good singer
Bad singer
— The contestants won the money.
— The winning bad singer stole the money.

Episode		Guest artist (Note: Players' notes: For the returning guest artists (who also include foreigners and former good singers), names are displayed in italics.; For the mixed groups, names who identified as bad singers are displayed in italics.)	Contestants	Mystery singers (In their respective numbers and aliases)						
#	Date	Guest artist	Contestants	Elimination order						Winner
#	Date	Guest artist	Contestants	TBA						Winner
1	21 September 2025	Dagmar Oja	Raila and Franka → €2,025	3. Rene Paul Allkivi; (Windsurfer)	1. Kalmer; (Basketball Referee)	7. Anna-Liisa Vain; (Phone Girl)	4. Sirle Morozova; (Brain Trainer)	2. Reelika Seiler; (Car Enthusiast)	5. Giina Lissmann; (Assistant)	6. Aivar Juuse; PE Teacher
2	28 September 2025	Hanna-Liina Võsa	Sille and Ingela Kaljuste → €2,025	4. Grete; (Witch)	3. Pille; (Football Camp Director)	6. (Latvia) Viktorija Agnese Vancāne; (Blondie)	2. Lembit Lepson; (Realtor)	1. Kristina Liiv; (Mother-to-be)	7. Katry-Mary; (Estonian Folk Dancer)	5. Stefania Boiko; Customer Service Representative
3	5 October 2025	Villemdrillem	Rain and Kristina Jakobson → €2,025	7. Lucia Vahtrik; (Mountaineer)	3. Davier Anis; (Baker)	6. Robert Sepp; (Battalion Leader)	4. Kristina Vähi; (Dance Partygoer)	1. Brenda Metsvaht; (Office Beauty)	5. Maria-Eliisa Pärnapuu; (Animal Lover)	2. Mirtel Velström; Cafeteria Girl
4	12 October 2025	Birgit Sarrap	Eva Reis and Maria Pulla → €0	7. Indrek Sakala; (Winter Sportsman)	2. Meelika and Maili Altmäe; (Twins)	6. Ardo Richter; (Media Artist)	5. Carmen Apsolon; (People's Athlete)	3. Indrek Hunt; (Defense Alliance Member)	1. Rebeka Palu; (Sleeping Beauty)	4. Anette Suuder; Poetess
5	19 October 2025 (Note: Despite being not preempted, this episode was also aired during Kanal 2's special coverage of the 2025 Estonian municipal elections.)	Getter Jaani	Karis and Andres → €2,025	4. Carolina; (Painter)	2. Carmen Marjette Jaksen; (Beauty Queen)	6. Taago Taaber; (Grill Cook)	5. Marilii Saar; (Unnie)	3. Kristiine-Marii; (Solo Dancer)	1. Ivar August Kalaus; (Massage Therapist)	7. Steven Saar; Marvel Fanatic
6	26 October 2025	Säm	Märten and Erika → €2,025	7. Katariina-Liina Buš; (Pole Dancer)	1. Natalja Popova; (Educator)	4. Merily Lasen; (Traffic Controller)	5. Meelis Suurväli; (Fisherman)	6. Arabella Luusalu; (Podcaster)	3. Reimo Kivine; (Parkourist)	2. Janete Gloria Ruusmann; Story Writer
7	2 November 2025	Lauri Liiv (Black Velvet)	Miki-Peep Soopere and Priit → €0	1. Maila Mängel; (Radiographer)	2. Kerttu Saagpakk; (Studio Potter)	6. Laura Reimann; (Film Producer)	5. Ketlin Aun; (Padel Coach)	4. Anželika Ruubel; (Talent Scout)	7. Roberto Kivi; (Sommelier)	3. Kadi Haljand; Dog Breeder
8	9 November 2025	Marianne Leibur	Raido and Kaarel → €2,025	5. Ly Turba; (Board Gamer)	3. Sandra Tõõbo; (Shopaholic Girl)	7. Kermo; (Biathlete)	2. Johanna Maria Opermann; (Nerd)	4. Sille Lavin; (Jam Queen)	1. Mariann Õmblus; (Play Therapist)	6. Silver Palm; Commercial Voice Over
9	16 November 2025	Reigo Tamm	Marko and Signe → €2,025	5. Katrin; (Hip-hop Fan)	3. Gert Toomra; (Bioanalyst)	6. Tarvo Madsen; (Travel Companion)	2. Tõnu Ling; (Arborist)	4. Karl Tamm; (Fishing Shanty Hipster)	1. Getter; (Journalist)	7. Kristina Lehtmets; Expert Advisor
10	23 November 2025	Tanja Mihhailova-Saar (Note: Season highlight: Foreign guest artist: Tanja Mihhailova-Saar (RUS; ep. 10))	Mari-Liis and Kairi → €2,025	7. Ilme Lätti; (Fishwife)	3. Airi Ojamets; (Speech Mentor)	6. Rasmus Roos; (Mariachi Player)	5. Emily Lääts; (Downhill Skier)	1. Imbi Põld; (Graphic Designer)	4. Oliver Veimer; (Firefighter)	2. Triinu Orm; Civil Engineer
11	30 November 2025	Kristel Aaslaid	Johannes and Marleen → €0	4. Arti Henri Lukk; (Robotics Engineer)	2. Maria Melaha; (Botanist)	5. Taivo Sotš; (Sunshine Boy)	6. Filippo Pozza; (Taekwondo Fighter)	7. Rebecca Eeskivi; (Auto Paint Technician)	1. Aurelia Eespere; (Coffee Lover)	3. Säde-Serena Õnnekuu; Vegan
12	7 December 2025	Stefan Airapetjan	Karin Käbi Kuus and Heleriin → €0	5. Diana Korka; (Pastry Chef)	1. Cristofer Reitmann; (Winger)	6. Heinar; (Health Athlete)	4. Hanna-Liisa Mölder; (AML Official)	3. Elise-Maria Trei; (Bike Trainer)	2. Kristjan Kõva; (Romeo Doppelgänger)	7. Kaire Sildnik; Silk Painter

=== Panelists ===
Legend:
Regular panelist
Additional panelist
Guest panelist

Apps		Panelists in attendance (Sorted by first appearance, with episode designations)
g#	p#	Panelists in attendance (Sorted by first appearance, with episode designations)
12	1	Evelin Võigemast (1–12)
9	2	Mart Juur (1, 3, 6–12); Korea (5miinust) (2–5, 7–8, 10–12)
8	1	Eleryn Tiit (2, 4–5, 7–11)
6	1	Tõnis Niinemets (1–2, 4–6, 9)
4	1	Kristel Aaslaid (1, 3, 6, 12)

== Postseason Showcase (14 December 2025) ==
Also in this season, a third postseason showcase (subtitled Ma ei näinud su häält, English: I Didn't See Your Voice) was aired one week after its final game. It featured non-televised duet performances by guest artists Stefan Airapetjan, An-Marlen, Elina Born, Birgit Sarrap, Reigo Tamm, and Koit Toome; as well as an encore concert headlined by good singers Meelika and Maili Altmäe, Aivar Juuse, Kristjan Kõva, Aave Lentso, Robin Mittenbritt, Filippo Pozza, and Stefan Zabolotnõi.

== Reception ==
Legend:
Highest rated episode
Lowest rated episode

No.	Title	Air date	Timeslot (EET)	Live + VOSDAL			Consolidated					
No.	Title	Air date	Timeslot (EET)	Live + VOSDAL			Rank	Per minute			Per show	
No.	Title	Air date	Timeslot (EET)	Rank	Points	Total	Rank	Points	Share	Total	Points	Total
1	"Dagmar Oja"	21 September 2025	Sunday, 20:05	7	8.2%	90,000	4	9.7%	37%	106,000	18.9%	207,000
2	"Hanna-Liina Võsa"	28 September 2025	Sunday, 20:05	2	10.4%	114,000	2	11.5%	30%	126,000	18.7%	205,000
3	"Villemdrillem"	5 October 2025	Sunday, 20:05	22	6.2%	68,000	12	8%	42%	88,000	17.4%	191,000
4	"Birgit Sarrap"	12 October 2025	Sunday, 20:05	16	6.3%	69,000	10	7.8%	39%	85,000	17.3%	189,000
5	"Getter Jaani"	19 October 2025	Sunday, 20:05	Not reported			18	7.1%	37%	77,000	14.7%	161,000
6	"Säm"	26 October 2025	Sunday, 20:05	22	6.3%	70,000	14	8%	34%	87,000	17.4%	190,000
7	"Lauri Liiv"	2 November 2025	Sunday, 20:05	17	7.5%	82,000	11	8.8%	33%	97,000	17.3%	189,000
8	"Marianne Leibur"	9 November 2025	Sunday, 20:05	22	6.8%	74,000	15	8.2%	37%	90,000	16.9%	186,000
9	"Reigo Tamm"	16 November 2025	Sunday, 20:05	23	6.9%	75,000	13	8.6%	36%	94,000	16.7%	183,000
10	"Tanja Mihhailova-Saar"	23 November 2025	Sunday, 20:05	30	5.8%	64,000	20	7.2%	35%	79,000	16.5%	181,000
11	"Kristel Aaslaid"	30 November 2025	Sunday, 20:05	6	9.6%	106,000	5	10.3%	23%	113,000	18.6%	203,000
12	"Stefan Airapetjan"	7 December 2025	Sunday, 20:05	29	5.8%	64,000	23	7.5%	41%	82,000	15.6%	171,000
Special	"I Didn't See Your Voice"	14 December 2025	Sunday, 20:05	24	6.6%	72,000	26	6.9%	21%	76,000	13.1%	144,000

Source: Kantar Emor
