= Estonia in the Eurovision Song Contest 2022 =

- Eurovision Song Contest 2022
- Participating broadcaster: Eesti Rahvusringhääling (ERR)
- Country: Estonia
- Selection process: Eesti Laul 2022
- Selection date: 12 February 2022

Competing entry
- Song: "Hope"
- Artist: Stefan
- Songwriters: Stefan Airapetjan; Karl-Ander Reismann

Placement
- Semi-final result: Qualified (5th, 209 points)
- Final result: 13th, 141 points

Participation chronology

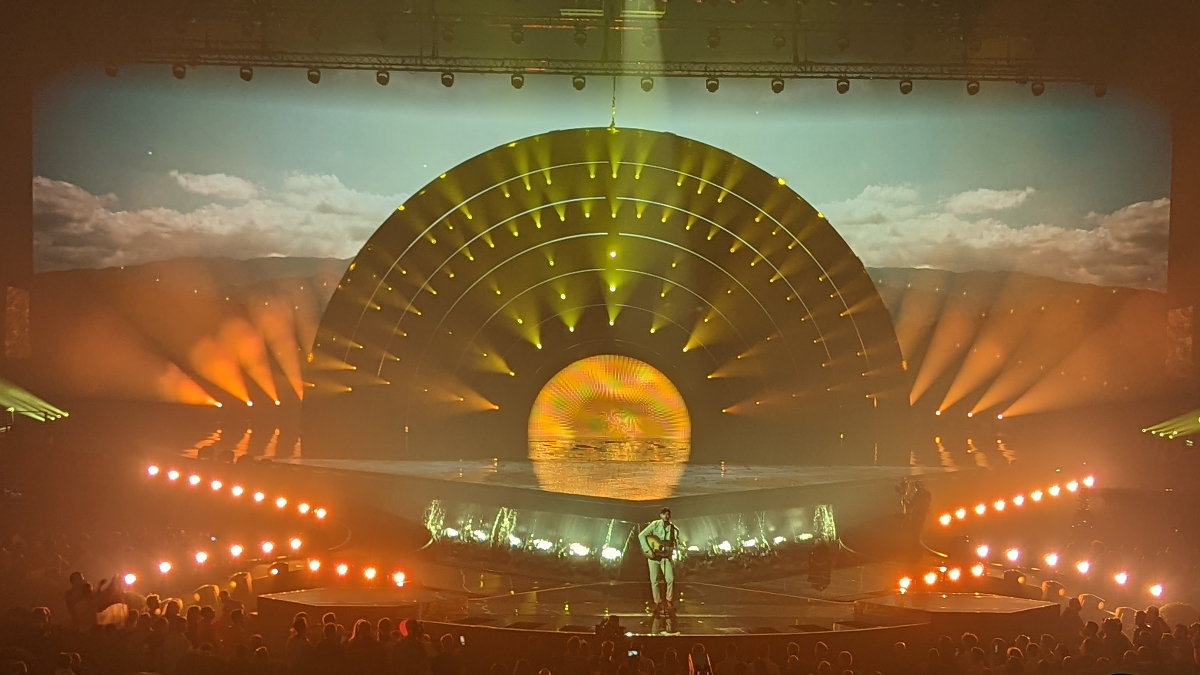
Stefan Airapetjan performs for Estonia at Eurovision 2022

Estonia was represented at the Eurovision Song Contest 2022 with the song "Hope" performed by Stefan. The Estonian broadcaster Eesti Rahvusringhääling (ERR) organised the national final Eesti Laul 2022 in order to select the Estonian entry for the contest. The national final consisted of seven shows: four quarter-finals, two semi-finals and a final. Ten songs competed in each quarter-final and semi-final and five from each show as determined by a jury panel and public vote qualified to the final. In the final, the winner was selected over two rounds of voting. In the first round, a jury panel and a public vote selected the top three to qualify to the superfinal. In the superfinal, "Hope" performed by Stefan was selected as the winner entirely by a public vote.

Estonia was drawn to compete in the second semi-final of the Eurovision Song Contest which took place on 12 May 2022. Performing during the show in position 12, "Hope" was announced among the top 10 entries of the first semi-final and therefore qualified to compete in the final on 18 May. It was later revealed that Estonia placed fifth out of the 18 participating countries in the semi-final with 209 points. In the final, Estonia was the closing performance of the show in position 25, placing thirteenth out of the 25 participating countries with 141 points.

== Background ==
Prior to the 2022 contest, Estonia had participated in the Eurovision Song Contest twenty-six times since its first entry in 1994, winning the contest on one occasion in 2001 with the song "Everybody" performed by Tanel Padar, Dave Benton and 2XL. Following the introduction of semi-finals for the 2004, Estonia has, to this point, managed to qualify to the final on seven occasions. In 2021, "The Lucky One" performed by Uku Suviste failed to qualify Estonia to the final where the song placed thirteenth in the semi-final.

The Estonian national broadcaster, Eesti Rahvusringhääling (ERR), broadcasts the event within Estonia and organises the selection process for the nation's entry. ERR confirmed Estonia's participation at the 2022 Eurovision Song Contest on 27 August 2021. Since their debut, the Estonian broadcaster has organised national finals that feature a competition among multiple artists and songs in order to select Estonia's entry for the Eurovision Song Contest. The Eesti Laul competition has been organised since 2009 in order to select Estonia's entry and on 28 August 2021, ERR announced the organisation of Eesti Laul 2022 in order to select the nation's 2022 entry.

== Before Eurovision ==
=== Eesti Laul 2022 ===
Eesti Laul 2022 was the fourteenth edition of the Estonian national selection Eesti Laul, which selected Estonia's entry for the Eurovision Song Contest 2022. The competition consisted of forty entries competing in four quarter-finals and two semi-finals, leading to a ten-song final on 12 February 2022. All shows were broadcast live on ETV, on ETV+ with Russian commentary as well as streamed online at the broadcaster's official website err.ee. The final was also broadcast in Spain on Ten as well as via radio in Estonia on Raadio 2 with commentary by Kristo Rajasaare, Margus Kamlat, Erik Morna and Robin Juhkental.

==== Format ====
The format of the competition included four quarter-finals on 20 November, 27 November, 4 December and 11 December 2021, two semi-finals on 3 and 5 February 2022 and a final on 12 February 2022. Ten songs competed in each quarter-final and five from each quarter-final qualified to the semi-finals. Ten songs competed in each semi-final and the top five from each semi-final qualified to complete the ten song lineup in the final. The results of the quarter-finals were determined solely by public televoting for the first three qualifiers and votes from a professional jury for the fourth and fifth qualifiers, while the results of the semi-finals were determined by the 50/50 combination of jury and public voting for the first qualifiers and a second round of public televoting for the remaining qualifiers. The winning song in the final was selected over two rounds of voting: the first round results selected the top three songs via the 50/50 combination of jury and public voting, while the second round (superfinal) determined the winner solely by public televoting.

==== Competing entries ====
On 2 September 2021, ERR opened the submission period for artists and composers to submit their entries up until 20 October 2021 through an online upload platform. Each artist and songwriter was able to submit a maximum of five entries. Foreign collaborations were allowed as long as one of the songwriters were Estonian and that there were a maximum of two foreign songwriters, one being the composer and one being the lyricist. A fee was also imposed on songs being submitted to the competition, with €50 for songs in the Estonian language and €100 for songs in other languages. 202 submissions were received by the deadline, of which 84 were in Estonian with the remaining in English, French, Spanish, Italian and an imaginary language. A 17-member jury panel consisting of Andi Raig, Bert Järvet, Eda-Ines Etti, Eric Kammiste, Heili Klandorf, Henri Laumets, Hugo Martin Maasikas, Jürgen Pärnsalu, Kadiah, Kaspar Viilup, Kerli Kivilaan, Lauri Laubre, Leonardo Romanello, Liis Lemsalu, Meelis Meri, Tarmo Hõbe and Thea Paluoja selected 40 quarter-finalists from the submissions and ten of the selected songs were announced each week on the ETV entertainment program Ringvaade, between 15 November 2021 and 7 December 2021.

Among the competing artists were previous Eurovision Song Contest entrants Evelin Samuel, who represented Estonia in 1999, Lauri Pihlap, who represented Estonia as member of 2XL in 2001 together with Tanel Padar and Dave Benton, Anna Sahlene, who represented Estonia in 2002, Ott Lepland, who represented Estonia in 2012, Stig Rästa, who represented Estonia in 2015 with Elina Born, and Elina Nechayeva, who represented Estonia in 2018. Alabama Watchdog, Andrei Zevakin, Ariadne, Desiree, Elysa, Emily J., Grete Paia, Helen, Inga Tislar (lead singer of deLulu), Jaagup Tuisk, Kéa, Lauri Liiv (lead singer of Black Velvet), Little Mess, Maian, Merilin Mälk, Meisterjaan, Púr Múdd, Shira, Sulev Lõhmus (percussionist of Black Velvet), Stefan, Traffic, Triin Niitoja and Wiiralt have all competed in previous editions of Eesti Laul. Little Mess' entry was co-written by Tanja, who represented Estonia in 2014, and the entry from Stig Rästa was co-written by Victor Crone, who represented Estonia in 2019.

Artist	Song	Songwriter(s)
Alabama Watchdog	"Move On"	Ken Einberg, Taaniel Pogga, Sven Seinpere, Linda Toom
An-Marlen	"Lõpuks muutub"	Ingel Marlen Mikk, Sander Sadam, Alvar Antson
Andrei Zevakin feat. Grete Paia	"Mis nüüd saab"	Andrei Zevakin, Henry Orlov, Grete Paia
Anna Sahlene	"Champion"	Anna Sahlene, Nicklas Ecklund, Dagmar Oja, Kaire Vilgats
Ariadne	"Shouldn't Be Friends"	Liina Ariadne Pedanik, Martti Hallik, Sofi Meronen, Aleksi Liski
Black Velvet	"Sandra"	Sven Lõhmus
Boamadu	"Mitte kauaks"	Peeter Priks, Keith Mutvei
deLulu	"Music Saved My Soul"	Taavi Paomets, Mairo Marjamaa, Inga Tislar
Desiree	"Siiani"	Hannes Agur Vellend, Desiree Mumm, Kretel Kopra
Dramanda	"Tule minu sisse"	Amanda Hermiine Künnapas, Hendrik Põlluste
Eleryn Tiit	"Tunnete keel"	Karl Killing, Gevin Niglas, Eleryn Tiit, Aron Blom
Elina Nechayeva	"Remedy"	Sven Lõhmus
Elysa	"Fire"	Linnea Deb, Ellen Benediktson, Andreas Stone, Elisa Kolk, Indrek Rahumaa
Emily J.	"Quicksilver"	Vallo Kikas, Emili Jürgens, Ani Nnebedum, Aleksanteri Hulkko
Evelin Samuel	"Waterfall"	Glen Pilvre, Priit Pajusaar, Katrin Pärn
Fiona and Me	"Feel Like This"	Fiona and Me
Goodreason	"Three Days Ago"	Hele-Mai Mängel
Helen	"Vaata minu poole"	Karl Killing, Gevin Niglas, Merili Käsper, Helen Randmets
Jaagup Tuisk	"Kui vaid"	Jaagup Tuisk, Rita Bavanati, Lauri Räpp
Jessica	"My Mom"	Steven Ilves, Jessica Rohelpuu
Jyrise	"Plaksuta"	Rauno Jürise, Tuomas Lehtinen, Mairo Virolainen, Sander Valge
Kaia-Liisa Kesler	"Vaikus"	Kaarel Orumägi, Kaia-Liisa Kesler
Kéa	"Everytime"	Andrei Zevakin, Ketter Orav
Lauri Pihlap	"Take Me Home"	Lauri Pihlap
Levvis	"Let's Talk About"	Aleksei Barudzin
Little Mess	"Hea päev"	Timo Vendt, Tanja Mihhailova-Saar, Andra Teede
Maian	"Meeletu"	Maian Lomp, Gevin Niglas
Meisterjaan	"Vahel lihtsalt"	Jaan Tätte Junior
Merilin Mälk	"Little Girl"	Karl-Ander Reismann
Minimal Wind feat. Elisabeth Tiffany	"What to Make of This"	Paula Pajusaar, Taavi-Hans Kõlar, Elisabeth Tiffany Lepik, Ralf Erik Kollom
Ott Lepland	"Aovalguses"	Ott Lepland, Maian Anna Kärmas, Karl-Ander Reismann
Peter Põder	"Koos lõpuni"	Peter Põder, Raul Krebs
Púr Múdd and Shira	"Golden Shores"	Madis Sillamo, Oliver Rõõmus, Joonatan Siiman, Kasper Krogh Vestergaard, Nikolaj Tøth Andersen
Shira	"Under Water"	Marika Rodionova, Kristi Raias, Johannes Laas
Silver Jusilo	"Elu rüpes"	Silver Jusilo
Stefan	"Hope"	Stefan Airapetjan, Karl-Ander Reismann
Stig Rästa	"Interstellar"	Stig Rästa, Fred Krieger, Victor Crone, Herman Gardarfve, David Lindgren Zacharias
Traffic	"Kaua veel"	Karl Killing, Andreas Poom, Fred Krieger, Silver Laas, Vallo Kikas
Triin Niitoja and Frants Tikerpuu	"Laululind"	Frants Tikerpuu
Wiiralt	"Kuradile"	Hendrik Sal-Saller, Martin Saaremägi

==== Shows ====
===== Quarter-finals =====
The four quarter-finals took place on 20 November, 27 November, 4 December and 11 December 2021 at the ERR studios in Tallinn, hosted by previous Estonian Eurovision Song Contest entrants: Tanel Padar and Eda-Ines Etti in the first quarter-final, Uku Suviste and Tanja Mihhailova-Saar in the second quarter-final, Ott Lepland and Laura Põldvere in the third quarter-final, and Getter Jaani and Jüri Pootsmann in the fourth quarter-final. In each quarter-final ten songs competed for the first three spots in the semi-finals with the outcome decided upon by a public televote which registered a total of 33,050 votes across the four quarter-finals; the remaining two qualifiers were decided by a jury panel between the remaining non-qualifiers. The jury panel that voted in the quarter-finals consisted of Sissi Nylia Benita, Synne Valtri, Egert Milder, Kadri Koppel, Olav Osolin, Bert Järvet, Vaido Pannel and Andres Puusepp.

Public vote qualifier Jury qualifier

Quarter-final 1 – 20 November 2021
R/O	Artist	Song	Jury	Televote		Result
R/O	Artist	Song	Jury	Votes	Rank	Result
1	Traffic	"Kaua veel"	4	501	6	Eliminated
2	Jaagup Tuisk	"Kui vaid"	1	434	9	Advanced
3	Kéa	"Everytime"	9	401	10	Eliminated
4	Fiona and Me	"Feel Like This"	5	440	8	Eliminated
5	Peter Põder	"Koos lõpuni"	8	736	5	Eliminated
6	Stig Rästa	"Interstellar"	3	1,422	2	Advanced
7	Maian	"Meeletu"	2	445	7	Advanced
8	Little Mess	"Hea päev"	7	1,048	4	Eliminated
9	Boamadu	"Mitte kauaks"	6	1,544	1	Advanced
10	Evelin Samuel	"Waterfall"	10	1,188	3	Advanced

Quarter-final 2 – 27 November 2021
R/O	Artist	Song	Jury	Televote		Result
R/O	Artist	Song	Jury	Votes	Rank	Result
1	Wiiralt	"Kuradile"	5	595	8	Eliminated
2	Desiree	"Siiani"	10	811	5	Eliminated
3	Silver Jusilo	"Elu rüpes"	9	773	6	Eliminated
4	Kaia-Liisa Kesler	"Vaikus"	1	576	9	Advanced
5	Helen	"Vaata minu poole"	7	1,134	3	Advanced
6	Jyrise	"Plaksuta"	2	466	10	Advanced
7	An-Marlen	"Lõpuks muutub"	4	605	7	Eliminated
8	Andrei Zevakin feat. Grete Paia	"Mis nüüd saab"	6	1,545	1	Advanced
9	Meisterjaan	"Vahel lihtsalt"	8	839	4	Eliminated
10	Triin Niitoja and Frants Tikerpuu	"Laululind"	3	1,514	2	Advanced

Quarter-final 3 – 4 December 2021
R/O	Artist	Song	Jury	Televote		Result
R/O	Artist	Song	Jury	Votes	Rank	Result
1	Stefan	"Hope"	4	2,050	1	Advanced
2	deLulu	"Music Saved My Soul"	3	280	10	Eliminated
3	Goodreason	"Three Days Ago"	9	387	9	Eliminated
4	Elina Nechayeva	"Remedy"	7	1,310	2	Advanced
5	Lauri Pihlap	"Take Me Home"	10	598	5	Eliminated
6	Levvis	"Let's Talk About"	5	512	8	Eliminated
7	Merilin Mälk	"Little Girl"	1	553	6	Advanced
8	Anna Sahlene	"Champion"	8	827	3	Advanced
9	Alabama Watchdog	"Move On"	2	529	7	Advanced
10	Shira	"Under Water"	6	739	4	Eliminated

Quarter-final 4 – 11 December 2021
R/O	Artist	Song	Jury	Televote		Result
R/O	Artist	Song	Jury	Votes	Rank	Result
1	Púr Múdd and Shira	"Golden Shores"	3	925	5	Advanced
2	Elysa	"Fire"	4	1,046	3	Advanced
3	Minimal Wind feat. Elisabeth Tiffany	"What to Make of This"	2	731	6	Advanced
4	Dramanda	"Tule minu sisse"	9	243	10	Eliminated
5	Emily J.	"Quicksilver"	8	353	9	Eliminated
6	Ott Lepland	"Aovalguses"	1	1,207	2	Advanced
7	Eleryn Tiit	"Tunnete keel"	6	600	7	Eliminated
8	Jessica	"My Mom"	10	416	8	Eliminated
9	Ariadne	"Shouldn't Be Friends"	5	956	4	Eliminated
10	Black Velvet	"Sandra"	7	1,771	1	Advanced

===== Semi-finals =====
The two semi-finals took place on 3 and 5 February 2022 at the Saku Suurhall in Tallinn, hosted by Priit Loog and previous Estonian Eurovision Song Contest entrant Maarja-Liis Ilus. In each semi-final ten songs competed for the first four spots in the final with the outcome decided upon by the combination of the votes from a jury panel and a public televote which registered 18,716 votes in the first semi-final and 18,195 votes in the second semi-final; the remaining two qualifiers were decided by an additional televote between the remaining non-qualifiers which registered 6,205 votes in the first semi-final and 6,066 votes in the second semi-final. The jury panel that voted in the semi-finals consisted of Alar Kotkas, Inger, Rolf Roosalu, Tanja Mihhailova-Saar, Kadri Tali, Villemdrillem, Margus Kamlat, Mari-Liis Männik, Elina Born, Mihkel Mattisen and Maris Järva.

First round (jury and televote) qualifier Second round (televote-only) qualifier

Semi-final 1 – 3 February 2022
R/O	Artist	Song	Jury		Televote		Total	Place
R/O	Artist	Song	Votes	Points	Votes	Points	Total	Place
1	Elysa	"Fire" (Note: The music video for "Fire" was used after Elysa was tested positive for COVID-19.)	77	6	5,206	12	18	1
2	Helen	"Vaata minu poole"	13	1	1,773	7	8	8
3	Andrei Zevakin feat. Grete Paia	"Mis nüüd saab"	54	5	2,521	10	15	2
4	Alabama Watchdog	"Move On"	52	4	566	1	5	10
5	Merilin Mälk	"Little Girl" (Note: The music video for "Little Girl" was used after Merilin Mälk was tested positive for COVID-19.)	78	7	1,058	2	9	7
6	Stig Rästa	"Interstellar"	92	12	1,149	3	15	3
7	Triin Niitoja and Frants Tikerpuu	"Laululind"	43	2	1,207	5	7	9
8	Kaia-Liisa Kesler	"Vaikus"	90	10	1,155	4	14	5
9	Elina Nechayeva	"Remedy"	50	3	2,414	8	11	6
10	Ott Lepland	"Aovalguses"	89	8	1,667	6	14	4

Semi-final 1 – Second round
Artist	Song	Televote	Place
Alabama Watchdog	"Move On"	395	4
Elina Nechayeva	"Remedy"	2,091	1
Helen	"Vaata minu poole"	375	5
Kaia-Liisa Kesler	"Vaikus"	1,212	3
Merilin Mälk	"Little Girl"	1,772	2
Triin Niitoja and Frants Tikerpuu	"Laululind"	360	6

Semi-final 2 – 5 February 2022
R/O	Artist	Song	Jury		Televote		Total	Place
R/O	Artist	Song	Votes	Points	Votes	Points	Total	Place
1	Jyrise	"Plaksuta"	40	2	417	1	3	10
2	Maian	"Meeletu"	78	7	1,221	3	10	6
3	Boamadu	"Mitte kauaks"	43	3	1,686	6	9	7
4	Evelin Samuel	"Waterfall"	20	1	1,227	4	5	9
5	Black Velvet	"Sandra"	56	6	2,261	8	14	3
6	Púr Múdd and Shira	"Golden Shores"	48	4	1,079	2	6	8
7	Jaagup Tuisk	"Kui vaid"	87	8	1,269	5	13	4
8	Minimal Wind feat. Elisabeth Tiffany	"What to Make of This" (Note: The music video for "What to Make of This" was used after Minimal Wind and Elisabeth Tiffany were tested positive for COVID-19.)	54	5	1,700	7	12	5
9	Stefan	"Hope"	116	12	4,752	12	24	1
10	Anna Sahlene	"Champion"	96	10	2,583	10	20	2

Semi-final 2 – Second round
Artist	Song	Televote	Place
Boamadu	"Mitte kauaks"	887	4
Evelin Samuel	"Waterfall"	1,245	2
Jyrise	"Plaksuta"	585	6
Maian	"Meeletu"	1,153	3
Minimal Wind feat. Elisabeth Tiffany	"What to Make of This"	1,357	1
Púr Múdd and Shira	"Golden Shores"	839	5

===== Final =====
The final took place on 12 February 2022 at the Saku Suurhall in Tallinn, hosted by Priit Loog and previous Estonian Eurovision Song Contest entrant Maarja-Liis Ilus. The five entries that qualified from each of the two preceding semi-finals, all together ten songs, competed during the show. The winner was selected over two rounds of voting. In the first round, a jury (50%) and public televote (50%) determined the top three entries to proceed to the superfinal. The public vote in the first round registered 69,514 votes. In the superfinal, "Hope" performed by Stefan was selected as the winner entirely by a public televote. The public televote in the superfinal registered 57,197 votes. In addition to the performances of the competing entries, the show was opened by Uku Suviste, who represented Estonia in the Eurovision Song Contest 2021, while Eurovision Song Contest 2002 hosts Annely Peebo and Marko Matvere as well as Jüri Pootsmann, who represented Estonia in the Eurovision Song Contest 2016, performed as the interval acts. The jury panel that voted in the first round of the final consisted of Jonathan Perkins (American songwriter and producer), Mr Lordi (Finnish musician), Audrius Giržadas (Lithuanian Eurovision Head of Delegation), Per Sunding (Swedish music producer and musician), Emily Griggs (Australian television producer and director), Natalie Horler (German singer), Lőrinc Bubnó (former Hungarian Eurovision Head of Delegation), Martin Sutton (British musician, songwriter and producer), Marta Cagnola (Italian music journalist and critic), Scarlet Keys (American songwriter) and Lotta Furebäck (Swedish choreographer).

Final – 12 February 2022
R/O	Artist	Song	Jury		Televote		Total	Place
R/O	Artist	Song	Votes	Points	Votes	Points	Total	Place
1	Elina Nechayeva	"Remedy"	43	1	2,862	4	5	8
2	Andrei Zevakin feat. Grete Paia	"Mis nüüd saab"	55	4	5,147	5	9	6
3	Jaagup Tuisk	"Kui vaid"	48	2	1,577	1	3	10
4	Elysa	"Fire"	66	7	14,747	10	17	3
5	Ott Lepland	"Aovalguses"	62	6	2,426	3	9	7
6	Stig Rästa	"Interstellar"	53	3	2,284	2	5	9
7	Minimal Wind feat. Elisabeth Tiffany	"What to Make of This"	101	12	7,699	8	20	2
8	Stefan	"Hope"	85	10	19,641	12	22	1
9	Anna Sahlene	"Champion"	69	8	5,668	6	14	4
10	Black Velvet	"Sandra"	56	5	7,463	7	12	5

Detailed jury votes
R/O	Song	Mr Lordi	M. Sutton	M. Cagnola	A. Giržadas	P. Sunding	N. Horler	S. Keys	L. Furebäck	E. Griggs	L. Bubnó	J. Perkins	Total
1	"Remedy"	4	3	4	7	1	6	2	3	4	4	5	43
2	"Mis nüüd saab"	1	7	10	3	12	4	4	2	2	3	7	55
3	"Kui vaid"	3	2	2	10	3	5	7	1	3	10	2	48
4	"Fire"	5	10	1	6	4	8	8	6	5	7	6	66
5	"Aovalguses"	7	6	6	4	5	7	6	10	7	1	3	62
6	"Interstellar"	10	8	12	2	7	2	3	5	1	2	1	53
7	"What to Make of This"	6	12	7	5	6	10	12	7	12	12	12	101
8	"Hope"	2	5	5	12	10	3	10	12	10	8	8	85
9	"Champion"	12	4	3	8	2	12	5	8	6	5	4	69
10	"Sandra"	8	1	8	1	8	1	1	4	8	6	10	56

Superfinal – 12 February 2022
Artist	Song	Televote	Place
Elysa	"Fire"	3,929	3
Minimal Wind ft. Elisabeth Tiffany	"What to Make of This"	17,587	2
Stefan	"Hope"	35,681	1

==== Ratings ====
Viewing figures by show
Show	Date	Viewing figures		Ref.
Show	Date	Nominal	Share	Ref.
Final	12 February 2022	240,000	20.3%	

== At Eurovision ==
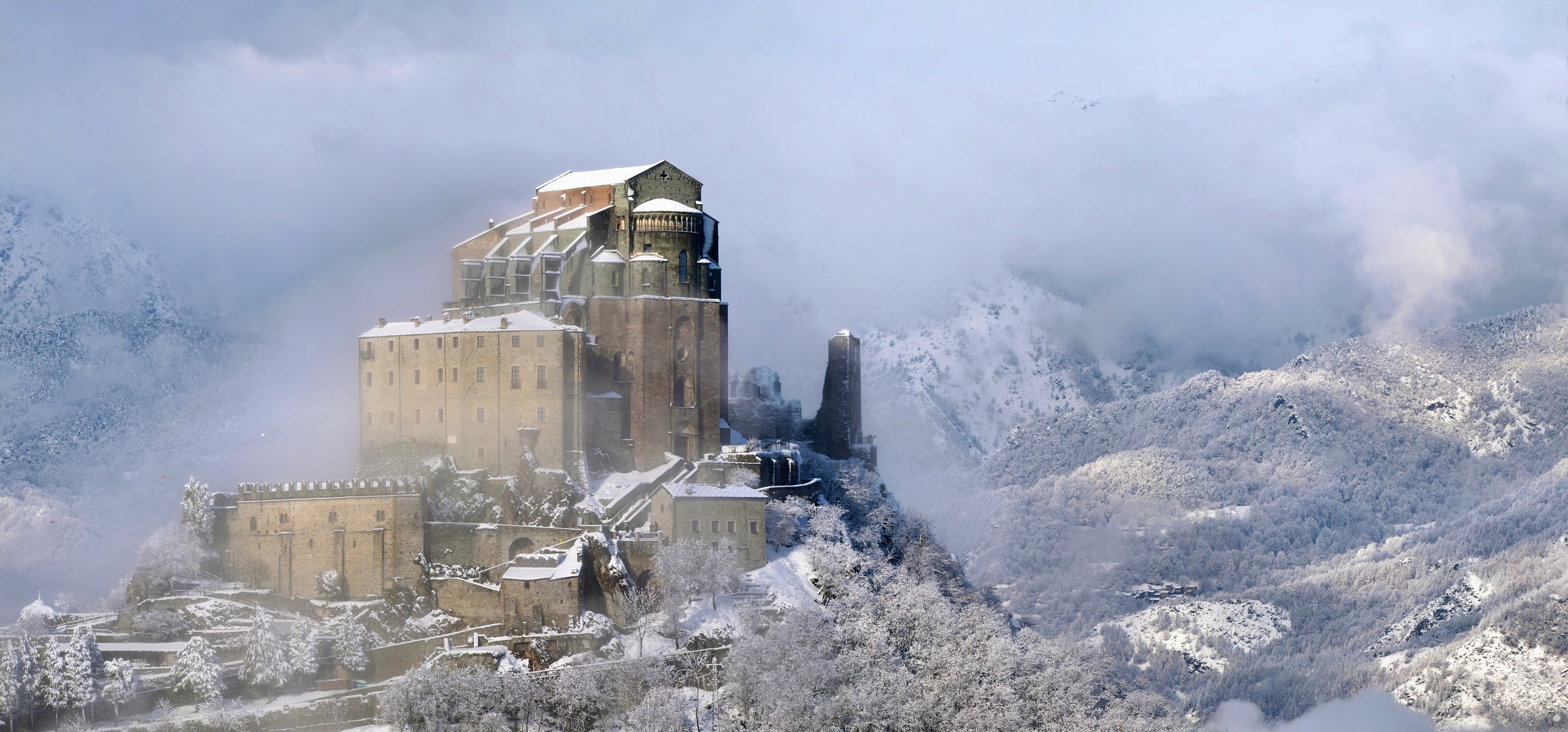
A video postcard introduced Stefan's performance in the second semi-final of the Eurovision Song Contest 2022. The postcard was filmed at the Sacra di San Michele in Sant'Ambrogio di Torino, Piedmont and featured virtual projections of Stefan across the location.

According to Eurovision rules, all nations with the exceptions of the host country and the "Big Five" (France, Germany, Italy, Spain and the United Kingdom) are required to qualify from one of two semi-finals in order to compete for the final; the top ten countries from each semi-final progress to the final. The European Broadcasting Union (EBU) split up the competing countries into six different pots based on voting patterns from previous contests, with countries with favourable voting histories put into the same pot. On 25 January 2022, an allocation draw was held which placed each country into one of the two semi-finals, as well as which half of the show they would perform in. Estonia was placed into the second semi-final, to be held on 12 May 2022, and was scheduled to perform in the second half of the show.

Once all the competing songs for the 2022 contest had been released, the running order for the semi-finals was decided by the shows' producers rather than through another draw, so that similar songs were not placed next to each other. Estonia was set to perform in position 12, following the entry from North Macedonia and before the entry from Romania.

The two semi-finals and the final were broadcast in Estonia on ETV with commentary in Estonian by Marko Reikop and on ETV+ with commentary in Russian by Aleksandr Hobotov and Julia Kalenda. The Estonian spokesperson, who announced the top 12-point score awarded by the Estonian jury during the final, was Tanel Padar who won the Eurovision Song Contest for Estonia in 2001 together with Dave Benton and 2XL.

=== Semi-final ===
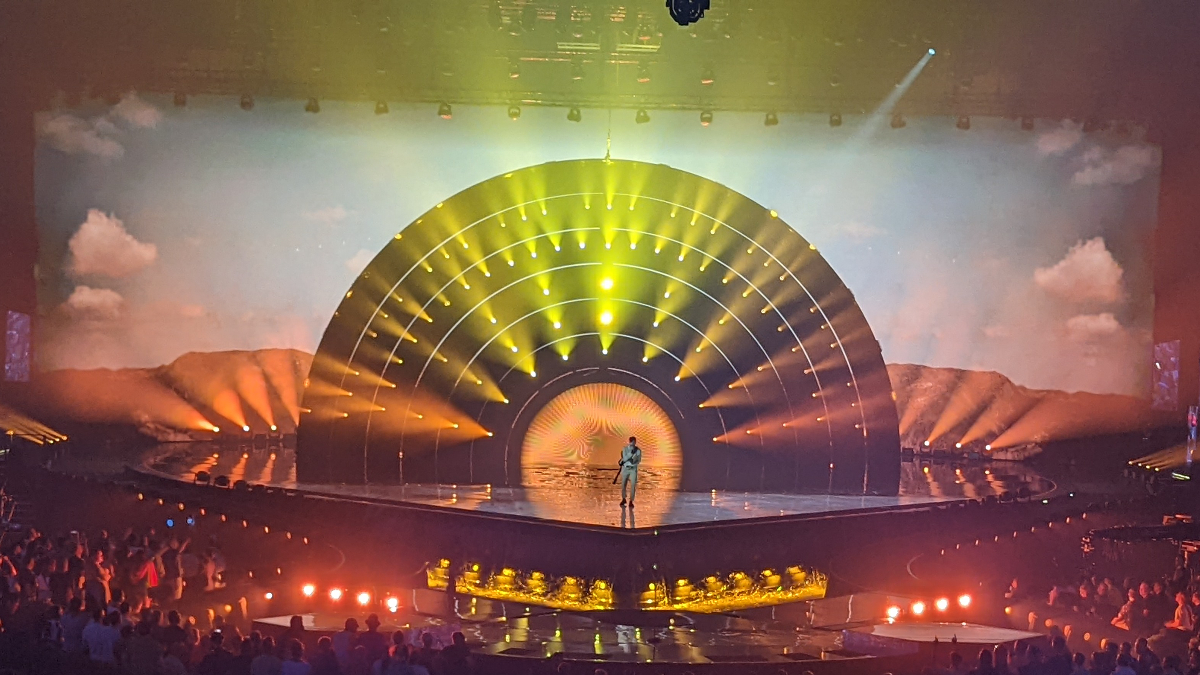
Stefan performing during the second semi-final

Stefan took part in technical rehearsals on 3 and 6 May, followed by dress rehearsals on 11 and 12 May. This included the jury show on 11 May where the professional juries of each country watched and voted on the competing entries.

The Estonian performance featured Stefan performing on stage in a white and beige outfit and starting on the satellite stage playing the guitar with a sepia filter on the camera that later faded away. During the second verse, Stefan moved to the main stage before jumping over the waterfall surrounding the stage to finish the final chorus on the satellite stage with the sepia filter being used again before fading to black. The stage displayed gold and blue colours with a Western-inspired desert scenery appearing on the LED screens.

At the end of the show, Estonia was announced as having finished in the top 10 and subsequently qualifying for the grand final. It was later revealed that Estonia placed fifth in the semi-final, receiving a total of 209 points: 96 points from the televoting and 113 points from the juries.

=== Final ===
Shortly after the second semi-final, a winners' press conference was held for the ten qualifying countries. As part of this press conference, the qualifying artists took part in a draw to determine which half of the grand final they would subsequently participate in. This draw was done in the order the countries appeared in the semi-final running order. Estonia was drawn to compete in the second half. Following this draw, the shows' producers decided upon the running order of the final, as they had done for the semi-finals. Estonia was subsequently placed to perform last in position 25, following the entry from Serbia.

Stefan once again took part in dress rehearsals on 13 and 14 May before the final, including the jury final where the professional juries cast their final votes before the live show. Stefan performed a repeat of his semi-final performance during the final on 14 May. Estonia placed thirteenth in the final, scoring 141 points: 98 points from the televoting and 43 points from the juries.

=== Voting ===
Voting during the three shows involved each country awarding two sets of points from 1-8, 10 and 12: one from their professional jury and the other from televoting. Each nation's jury consisted of five music industry professionals who are citizens of the country they represent. This jury judged each entry based on: vocal capacity; the stage performance; the song's composition and originality; and the overall impression by the act. In addition, each member of a national jury may only take part in the panel once every three years, and no jury was permitted to discuss of their vote with other members or be related in any way to any of the competing acts in such a way that they cannot vote impartially and independently. The individual rankings of each jury member in an anonymised form as well as the nation's televoting results were released shortly after the grand final.

Below is a breakdown of points awarded to Estonia and awarded by Estonia in the second semi-final and grand final of the contest, and the breakdown of the jury voting and televoting conducted during the two shows:

==== Points awarded to Estonia ====
Points awarded to Estonia (Semi-final 2)
Score	Televote	Jury
12 points	Finland	
10 points	Poland	Serbia; Sweden
8 points	Czech Republic; Romania; Sweden	Ireland; Malta
7 points	Belgium; Georgia; Montenegro	Azerbaijan; Cyprus; Czech Republic; Georgia; Poland; Romania; San Marino
6 points	Ireland	Montenegro
5 points		Australia
4 points	Germany; Israel; Serbia	Finland; Germany; United Kingdom
3 points	Australia; Cyprus	Israel
2 points	Spain; United Kingdom	North Macedonia
1 point	North Macedonia	

Points awarded to Estonia (Final)
Score	Televote	Jury
12 points	Armenia	
10 points	Finland	Serbia
8 points	Latvia; Lithuania; Poland	Czech Republic
7 points	Moldova	
6 points	Serbia	Sweden
5 points	Albania; Romania; Ukraine	Malta; Moldova; United Kingdom
4 points	Czech Republic; Sweden	
3 points	Denmark; Montenegro; North Macedonia	Armenia
2 points	Croatia; Norway; United Kingdom	
1 point	Netherlands	Australia

==== Points awarded by Estonia ====
Points awarded by Estonia (Semi-final 2)
Score	Televote	Jury
12 points	Finland	Sweden
10 points	Sweden	Australia
8 points	Czech Republic	Finland
7 points	Belgium	Czech Republic
6 points	Poland	Azerbaijan
5 points	Australia	Belgium
4 points	Serbia	Ireland
3 points	Malta	Georgia
2 points	Romania	Romania
1 point	Georgia	Malta

Points awarded by Estonia (Final)
Score	Televote	Jury
12 points	Ukraine	Sweden
10 points	Sweden	Italy
8 points	Finland	Australia
7 points	Lithuania	Portugal
6 points	Moldova	Greece
5 points	United Kingdom	Finland
4 points	Norway	United Kingdom
3 points	Netherlands	Azerbaijan
2 points	Germany	Lithuania
1 point	Spain	Netherlands

==== Detailed voting results ====
The following members comprised the Estonian jury:

- Karl Killing
- Liina Ariadne Pedanik
- Maian Anna Kärmas
- Sven Lõhmus
- Toomas Olljun

Detailed voting results from Estonia (Semi-final 2)
R/O	Country	Jury							Televote	
R/O	Country	Juror A	Juror B	Juror C	Juror D	Juror E	Rank	Points	Rank	Points
01	Finland	4	5	4	2	7	3	8	1	12
02	Israel	6	7	13	16	12	12		15	
03	Serbia	17	17	7	17	17	17		7	4
04	Azerbaijan	3	12	3	13	4	5	6	16	
05	Georgia	15	3	17	15	6	8	3	10	1
06	Malta	10	14	14	4	9	10	1	8	3
07	San Marino	7	16	6	14	11	11		11	
08	Australia	2	2	2	3	2	2	10	6	5
09	Cyprus	11	15	15	8	8	13		12	
10	Ireland	13	11	12	5	5	7	4	14	
11	North Macedonia	14	10	9	10	16	14		13	
12	Estonia									
13	Romania	9	9	8	6	13	9	2	9	2
14	Poland	12	13	10	11	14	15		5	6
15	Montenegro	16	8	16	12	15	16		17	
16	Belgium	5	6	11	7	10	6	5	4	7
17	Sweden	1	1	1	1	1	1	12	2	10
18	Czech Republic	8	4	5	9	3	4	7	3	8

Detailed voting results from Estonia (Final)
R/O	Country	Jury							Televote	
R/O	Country	Juror A	Juror B	Juror C	Juror D	Juror E	Rank	Points	Rank	Points
01	Czech Republic	14	17	18	17	15	21		20	
02	Romania	24	16	14	16	21	22		18	
03	Portugal	2	11	15	7	4	4	7	11	
04	Finland	10	10	10	2	6	6	5	3	8
05	Switzerland	13	15	9	24	5	12		17	
06	France	21	6	13	13	19	15		21	
07	Norway	12	21	24	12	22	20		7	4
08	Armenia	8	13	17	8	16	13		14	
09	Italy	5	2	2	4	1	2	10	15	
10	Spain	16	7	16	10	7	11		10	1
11	Netherlands	6	12	5	14	17	10	1	8	3
12	Ukraine	15	8	12	15	11	14		1	12
13	Germany	19	19	23	11	14	19		9	2
14	Lithuania	4	18	7	19	10	9	2	4	7
15	Azerbaijan	18	3	4	18	20	8	3	24	
16	Belgium	17	14	11	21	13	17		19	
17	Greece	7	4	6	6	12	5	6	23	
18	Iceland	11	22	22	20	9	16		16	
19	Moldova	20	23	21	22	23	23		5	6
20	Sweden	1	1	1	1	2	1	12	2	10
21	Australia	3	5	3	3	3	3	8	22	
22	United Kingdom	9	9	8	5	8	7	4	6	5
23	Poland	23	20	19	9	18	18		13	
24	Serbia	22	24	20	23	24	24		12	
25	Estonia									
