= Tuisk =

Family name

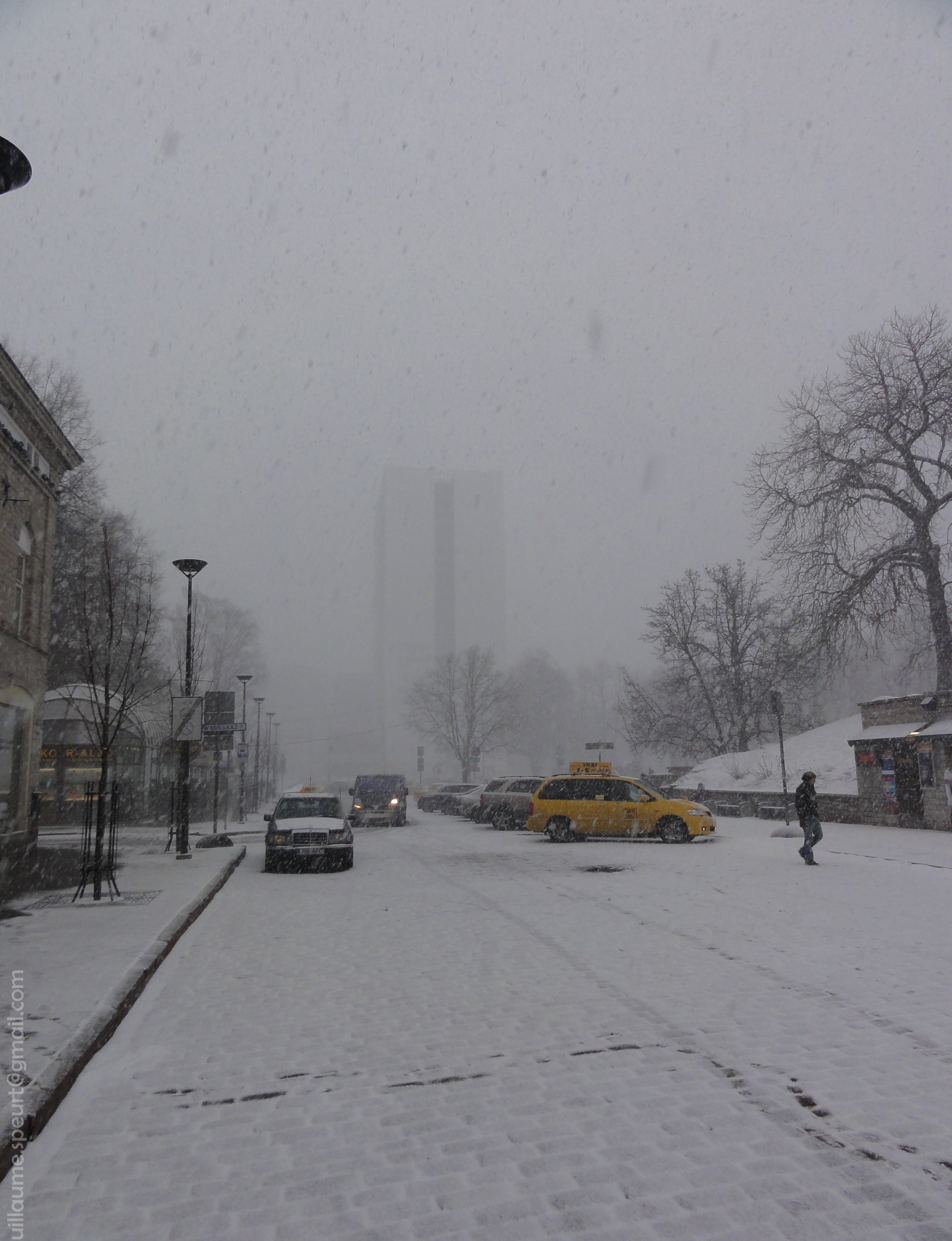
- Blizzard in Tallinn at Viru Keskus in 2011

Origin
- Language: Estonian
- Meaning: "blizzard"
- Region of origin: Estonia

Tuisk is an Estonian language surname meaning "blizzard". As of 1 January 2023, 227 men and 284 women bear the surname Tuisk in Estonia. Tuisk ranks 241st for men and 186th for women in terms of prevalence of surnames in the country. Tuisk is most commonly found in Saare County, where 10.13 per 10,000 inhabitants bear the name.

People bearing the surname Tuisk include:

- Aidi Gerde Tuisk (born 2002), racing cyclist
- Jaagup Tuisk (born 2001), pop singer
- Mart Tuisk (1889–1942), military colonel
- Tambet Tuisk (born 1976), actor
