= Ma näen su häält season 5 =

Television game show season

Ma näen su häält
- Season 5
- Starring: Kristel Aaslaid; Mart Juur; Korea (5miinust); Tõnis Niinemets; Eleryn Tiit
- Hosted by: Evelin Võigemast (Note: Season highlight: Evelin Võigemast, who assigned panelist duties for 4 seasons, became a host for that entire season, while Piret Laos was in a parental leave at the time.)
- Winners: Good singers: 3; Bad singers: 3
- No. of episodes: 6

Release
- Original network: Kanal 2
- Original release: 13 April – 18 May 2025

Additional information
- Filming dates: 9 April – 10 April 2025

Season chronology
- ← Previous; Season 4 Next → Season 6

The fifth season of the Estonian television mystery music game show Ma näen su häält premiered on Kanal 2 on 13 April 2025.

== Gameplay ==
=== Format ===
According to the original South Korean rules, the guest artist and contestants must attempt to eliminate bad singers during its game phase. At the final performance, the last remaining mystery singer is revealed as either good or bad by means of a duet between them and one of the guest artists.

If the last remaining mystery singer is good, the contestants win €2,025; this is also applied to the winning bad singer selected by them.

=== Rounds ===
1. TBA (Estonian: TBA)

== Episodes ==
=== Guest artists ===
Legend:
Good singer
Bad singer
— The contestants won the money.
— The winning bad singer stole the money.

Episode		Guest artist (Note: Players' notes: For the returning guest artists (who also include foreigners and former good singers), names are displayed in italics.; For the mixed groups, names who identified as bad singers are displayed in italics.)	Contestants	Mystery singers (In their respective numbers and aliases)						
#	Date	Guest artist	Contestants	Elimination order						Winner
#	Date	Guest artist	Contestants	TBA						Winner
1	13 April 2025	Karl Killing	Rasmus Voolaid and Mart Treial → €0	6. Karli Pastak; (Kuldsed Käed Janitor)	1. Andri Lobjakas; (Researcher)	4. Kerli Pungas; (Eyebrow Specialist)	5. Linette Risttee; (Perfume Connoisseur)	2. Kersti Jänes; (Daytime Runner)	3. Kenneth Laus; (Printing Press Operator)	7. Heidi Udeküll; Young Actress
2	20 April 2025	Ott Lepland	Tiina and Kadly Künnap → €2,025	6. Ly Unga; (Sports Photographer)	1. Victoria Oolo; (Crime Writer)	2. Piia Tõnisma; (Fairytale Creator)	7. Lembit Kopso; (One-man Band)	5. Piret Hallik; (Director)	4. Inna Bertero; (Oil Painter)	3. Getter Kägu; Stewardess
3	27 April 2025	Birgit Sarrap	Anneli and Rainer Leppik → €2,025	6. Olav Mets; (Marathon Runner)	1. Sandra Arumäe; (Ace Dancer)	3. Aave Lentso; (Pensioner)	7. Tanel Kermas; (Sales Representative)	4. Olari Viikholm; (Choir Singer)	2. Helena Vain; (Housewife)	5. Aare Külvja; Farmworker
4	4 May 2025	Koit Toome	Ketty and Florika → €0	2. Margit Udam; (Maths Teacher)	3. Hannelore Karmel Juurikas; (Herbalist)	4. Robin Mittenbritt; (Midfielder)	7. Margit Leinus; (Driving Instructor)	5. Raul Kivi; (Lawyer)	1. Aleksei Bljahhin; (Software Developer)	6. Laureen Teesalu; Grade 9 Student
5	11 May 2025	Elina Born	Mehis Pärn and Tiina Jacobi → €2,025	2. Merit Hirvoja-Tamm; (Padel Player)	1. Stefan Zabolotnõi; (MNSH Fan)	4. Elvis Jakobson; (Drummer)	6. Karl Kramm; (Handball Goalkeeper)	5. Avely Koppel; (K-pop Fan)	7. Ivar Nelk; (Fish Smoker)	3. Piret Lilleste; Auditor
6	18 May 2025	An-Marlen	Virve Soeson and Kristjan Kriss → €0	1. Getter-Heleen Aasa; (Hairstylist)	2. Jane Sõõro; (Kalevi's Daughter)	4. Getter Hallikmäe; (Gardener)	7. Kristel Kolga; (Folklorist)	3. Kevin Loorits; (Microinvestor)	6. Jüri Valt; (Engine Surgeon)	5. Gunnar Peebu; Chess Player

=== Panelists ===
Legend:
Regular panelist
Additional panelist
Guest panelist

Apps		Panelists in attendance (Sorted by first appearance, with episode designations)
g#	p#	Panelists in attendance (Sorted by first appearance, with episode designations)
6	2	Korea (5miinust) and Eleryn Tiit (1–6)
3	3	Kristel Aaslaid (1–3); Tõnis Niinemets (2–4); Mart Juur (2, 5–6)
1	3	Andrei Zevakin (1); Synne Valtri (5); Piret Laos (6)

== Reception ==
Legend:
Highest rated episode
Lowest rated episode

No.	Title	Air date	Timeslot (EET)	Live + VOSDAL			Consolidated					
No.	Title	Air date	Timeslot (EET)	Live + VOSDAL			Rank	Per minute			Per show	
No.	Title	Air date	Timeslot (EET)	Rank	Points	Total	Rank	Points	Share	Total	Points	Total
1	"Karl Killing"	13 April 2025	Sunday, 20:05	6	9.5%	107,000	5	11.7%	37%	131,000	23.8%	267,000
2	"Ott Lepland"	20 April 2025	Sunday, 20:05	6	8.4%	94,000	5	10.1%	31%	113,000	21.7%	243,000
3	"Birgit Sarrap"	27 April 2025	Sunday, 20:05	11–15	7.6%	85,000	10	9.1%	36%	103,000	17.8%	200,000
4	"Koit Toome"	4 May 2025	Sunday, 20:05	7	8.9%	100,000	5	10%	34%	112,000	21.3%	239,000
5	"Elina Born"	11 May 2025	Sunday, 20:05	3	11.1%	124,000	3	11.9%	25%	133,000	20.8%	233,000
6	"An-Marlen"	18 May 2025	Sunday, 20:05	7	11.3%	127,000	7	11.8%	21%	132,000	19.9%	223,000

Source: Kantar Emor
