= Ma näen su häält =

Estonian television game show

- Genre: Game show
- Based on: I Can See Your Voice by CJ ENM
- Directed by: Anna Stepanova
- Presented by: Piret Laos (1–4, 6); Evelin Võigemast (5)
- Starring: The celebrity panelists (see cast)
- Country of origin: Estonia
- Original language: Estonian
- No. of seasons: 6
- No. of episodes: Regular: 60; Special: 4; Overall: 64

Production
- Executive producer: Triin Luhats
- Producer: Kaupo Karelson
- Camera setup: Multi-camera
- Production company: Ruut

Original release
- Network: Kanal 2
- Release: 27 February 2022 – 14 December 2025

Related
- I Can See Your Voice franchise

Ma näen su häält (lit. 'I Can See Your Voice') is an Estonian television mystery music game show based on the South Korean programme of the same title, featuring its format where a guest artist and contestants attempt to eliminate bad singers from the group, until the last mystery singer remains for a duet performance. It first aired on Kanal 2 on 27 February 2022.

== Gameplay ==
=== Format ===
Over the course of four rounds, the guest artist and a pair of contestants must attempt to eliminate bad singers from a group of seven "mystery singers", identified only by their occupation or alias, without ever hearing them perform live. They are assisted by clues regarding the singers' backgrounds, style of performance, and observations from a celebrity panel. At the end of a game, the last remaining mystery singer is revealed as either good or bad by means of a duet between them and one of the guest artists. (Note: Gameplay note: The winning contestants or a bad singer gets a cash prize, based on the airing year of its season, starting from €2,022 and so on.)

If the last remaining mystery singer is good, the contestants win a cash prize; this is also applied to the winning bad singer selected by them.

=== Rounds ===
==== Visual round ====
- First impression (Estonian: Esimene mulje)

s1–3: The guest artist and contestants are given some time to observe and examine each mystery singer based on their appearance.

==== Lip sync round ====
- Moving the mouth (Estonian: Suu liigutamine)

s1–3: Each mystery singer performs a lip sync to a song; good singers mime to a recording of their own, while bad singers mime to a backing track by another vocalist.

==== Evidence round ====
- Home video (Estonian: Koduvideo)

s1–3: The guest artist and contestants are presented with a video package containing possible clues by one of the mystery singers.

==== Interrogation round ====
- Cross-examination (Estonian: Ristküsitlus)

s1–3: The guest artist and contestants may ask questions to the remaining mystery singers. Good singers are required to give truthful responses, while the bad singers must lie.

==== Rehearsal round ====
- Sound studio (Estonian: Helistuudio)

s6: A video recording from a studio session by one of the remaining mystery singers reveal only 0.3 seconds of their singing voice as an additional hint.

== Production ==
Following the success of Maskis laulja, TV3 has initially made interest to produce an Estonian adaptation of I Can See Your Voice, as part of CJ ENM's dealing with Fremantle in November 2020. Duo Media Networks would later acquire the rights in January 2022, with Ruut assigning on production duties.

== Broadcast history ==
Ma näen su häält debuted on 27 February 2022. One week after first season finale, a highlight special (subtitled Suurimad üllatused, transl. The Biggest Surprises) was aired on 22 May 2022.

One day after concluding its first season, Kanal 2 already renewed the series for a second season, which premiered on 18 September 2022; this also conducted an in-game event Ma kuulen su häält (transl. I Hear Your Voice) and a follow-up postgame aftershow Ma nägin su häält (transl. I Saw Your Voice).

As part of Kanal 2's 30th anniversary programming lineup that announced in May 2023, the said network renewed the series for a third season, which premiered on 17 September 2023.

During the second season finale of Tähtede täht in May 2024, the series has announced to renew for a fourth season, which premiered on 22 September 2024.

In February 2025, Kanal 2 renewed the series for a fifth season during upfronts for their spring programming lineup, with filming taking place at TV3 Stuudio in Tallinn, and began airing on 13 April 2025. One month after that finale, auditions for an upcoming sixth season commenced in June 2025, which was subsequently confirmed by Kanal 2 and premiered on 21 September 2025.

For three seasons, a series of postseason showcases (subtitled Ma ei näinud su häält, transl. I Didn't See Your Voice) featured an encore concert with some of invited mystery singers return to perform one last time, and non-televised duet performances by respective guest artists. Special episodes in the third and fourth seasons have been aired on the last day of the year, while the sixth season had also aired one week concluding its final game.

== Cast ==
The series employs a panel of celebrity "detectives" who assist the guest artists and contestants in identifying good and bad mystery singers throughout the game. Along with regular members, guest panelists also appear since the first season. Overall, nine celebrities have served as panelists, with their original lineup consisting of Mart Juur, Grete Kuld, Evelin Võigemast, and Andrei Zevakin. Later members who joined the group's duties also include Tõnis Niinemets from the 2nd season; Kristel Aaslaid from the 4th season; and Eleryn Tiit from the 5th season. 5miinust members Estoni Kohver and Korea had their individual panelist duties.

| Designations: |
| Main cast member | H Hosting duties |
| Additional cast member | g# Total games attended, by panelists |

| Cast member | Seasons | | | | | |
| Cast member | 1 | 2 | 3 | 4 | 5 | 6 |
|---|---|---|---|---|---|---|
| Piret Laos | H | H | H | H | 1 (Note: Panelists' note: In the 5th season, Evelin Võigemast assigned her hosting duties, while Piret Laos was on a parental leave at the time; Laos would subsequently return in the finale as a guest panelist.) | H |
| Mart Juur | 9 | | | | 3 | 9 |
| Estoni Kohver (5miinust) | 7 | | 9 | 5 | | |
| Grete Kuld | 11 | 12 | 12 | | | |
| Evelin Võigemast | 9 | 12 | 10 | 6 | H | 12 |
| Andrei Zevakin | 10 | 6 | 9 | | | |
| Tõnis Niinemets | | 11 | | 4 | 3 | 6 |
| Kristel Aaslaid | | | | 6 | 3 | |
| Korea (5miinust) | | | | | 6 | 9 |
| Eleryn Tiit | | | | | 6 | 8 |

== Series overview ==
| Series | Episodes | Originally released | | Good singers | Bad singers |
| Series | Episodes | First released | Last released | Good singers | Bad singers |
|---|---|---|---|---|---|
| 1 | 12 | 27 February 2022 | 15 May 2022 | 10 | 2 |
| 2 | 12 | 18 September 2022 | 4 December 2022 | 6 | 6 |
| 3 | 12 | 17 September 2023 | 3 December 2023 | 9 | 3 |
| 4 | 6 | 22 September 2024 | 27 October 2024 | 3 | 3 |
| 5 | 6 | 13 April 2025 | 18 May 2025 | 3 | 3 |
| 6 | 12 | 21 September 2025 | 7 December 2025 | 8 | 4 |
| Sp | 4 | 22 May 2022 | 14 December 2025 | —N/a | —N/a |

== Accolades ==
| Event | Year (Note: Indicates the year of ceremony) | Category | Nominee(s) | Result | Ref(s) |
|---|---|---|---|---|---|
| Estonian Film and Television Awards | 2023 | Best Entertainment Show | Ma näen su häält | Nominated | |
| Estonian Film and Television Awards | 2023 | Best Host | Piret Laos | Nominated | |
| Estonian Film and Television Awards | 2024 | Best Entertainment Show | Ma näen su häält | Won | |
