= Ma näen su häält season 1 =

Television game show season

Ma näen su häält
- Season 1
- Starring: Mart Juur; Estoni Kohver (5miinust); Grete Kuld; Evelin Võigemast; Andrei Zevakin
- Hosted by: Piret Laos
- Winners: Good singers: 10; Bad singers: 2
- No. of episodes: Regular: 12; Special: 1; Overall: 13

Release
- Original network: Kanal 2
- Original release: 27 February – 22 May 2022

Season chronology
- Next → Season 2

The first season of the Estonian television mystery music game show Ma näen su häält premiered on Kanal 2 on 27 February 2022.

== Gameplay ==
=== Format ===
According to the original South Korean rules, the guest artist and contestants must attempt to eliminate bad singers during its game phase. At the final performance, the last remaining mystery singer is revealed as either good or bad by means of a duet between them and one of the guest artists.

If the last remaining mystery singer is good, the contestants win €2,022; this is also applied to the winning bad singer selected by them.

=== Rounds ===
1. First impression (Estonian: Esimene mulje)
  The guest artist and contestants are given some time to observe and examine each mystery singer based on their appearance.
2. Moving the mouth (Estonian: Suu liigutamine)
  Each mystery singer performs a lip sync to a song; good singers mime to a recording of their own, while bad singers mime to a backing track by another vocalist.
3. Home video (Estonian: Koduvideo)
  The guest artist and contestants are presented with a video package containing possible clues by one of the mystery singers.
4. Cross-examination (Estonian: Ristküsitlus)
  The guest artist and contestants may ask questions to the remaining mystery singers. Good singers are required to give truthful responses, while the bad singers must lie.

== Episodes ==
=== Guest artists ===
Legend:
Good singer
Bad singer
— The contestants won the money.
— The winning bad singer stole the money.

Episode		Guest artist (Note: Players' notes: For the returning guest artists (who also include foreigners and former good singers), names are displayed in italics.; For the mixed groups, names who identified as bad singers are displayed in italics.)	Contestants	Mystery singers (In their respective numbers and aliases)						
#	Date	Guest artist	Contestants	Elimination order						Winner
#	Date	Guest artist	Contestants	First impression	Moving the mouth		Home video		Cross-examination	Winner
1	27 February 2022	Tanel Padar	Henri and Enn → €2,022	1. Edgar Kõpp; (Fisherman)	3. Aita Kaaver; (Beekeeper)	7. Helen Maidre; (Fire Dancer)	2. Jana Abzalon; (Secretary)	6. Sten Erik-Liiv; (Cruise Star)	5. Indrek Hinno; (Wedding Groom)	4. Kailiin Dubrov; Filmmaker
2	6 March 2022	Anne Veski	Leanika and Ketlyn → €2,022	7. Joosep Järve; (Band Boy)	2. Kati Roosi Siht; (Poker Player)	6. Eva Enika Rauba; (Miss Bikini)	4. Sergei Saveljev; (Top Manager)	3. Ilja Simpson; (Dance Boy)	5. Marelle Vaino; (Preschool Teacher)	1. Andra Aus; Working Animal
3	13 March 2022	Jüri Pootsmann	Marge and Kristi → €2,022	2. Peeter Veltmann; (Baker)	4. Pille Siht; (Motorcycle Rider)	6. Nikola Kolev; (Bulgarian Mickey Mouse)	1. Teet Kaur; (Estonian Language Teacher)	7. Maarja Holter; (Housewife)	5. Valdik Kask; (Santa Claus)	3. Maiko Yamada; Globetrotter
4	20 March 2022	Koit Toome	Karit and Karmo → €2,022	6. Erkki Leek; (Basketball Coach)	2. Rait Sohkin; (Art Student)	5. Natalia Taling; (Shopkeeper)	4. Silver Piiroja; (Sports Boy)	3. Lii Aalik; (Ballroom Dancer)	7. Triin-Eliis Süld; (Classic Fan)	1. Hanna Rebeka Leintštrep; Photographer
5	27 March 2022	Nele-Liis Vaiksoo	Taavi and Jako → €0	7. Kristo Leier; (Salesman)	1. Kristi Rahumägi; (Frisbee Player)	5. Vahur Krautman; (Grill Master)	2. Karel Tohv; (Gamer)	6. Hõbe-Heli Ahk; (Chanter)	4. Mirjam Kits; (Tennis Player)	3. Mihkel Juhkam; Tõnis' Successor
6	3 April 2022	Silver Laas (Traffic)	Andra and Sander → €2,022	7. Anton Klink; (Personal Trainer)	4. Pavel Ponomarjov; (Bartender)	2. Einike Sooväli; (Tour Guide)	1. Felipe Brito; (Footballer)	5. Armand Danilson; (Woodworking Teacher)	6. Ulrika Saar; (Folk Dancer)	3. Kristiin Koppel; Working Student
7	10 April 2022	Eda-Ines Etti	Daisi and Kristjan → €2,022	7. Vivika Vool; (Flower Child)	1. Jaanus Hallik; (Actor)	4. Kristiine Pajusaar; (Make-up Artist)	3. Egon Punnison; (Troubadour)	5. Kersti Annok; (Bartender)	2. Candy Kikkas; (Waitress)	6. Konstantin Sedov; Radio DJ
8	17 April 2022	Elina Born	Liisa and Silver → €0	4. Ain Peegel; (Plumber)	2. Carlos Liiv; (Exchange Student)	6. Reena Uusmets; (Zumba Instructor)	3. Nora Viikmaa; (Säärane Mulk)	7. Kätlin Bärton; (Rally Racing Fan)	1. Kusti Muri; (Cross-country Rider)	5. Kaire Koidu; Belly Dancer
9	24 April 2022	Getter Jaani	Jane and Monalisa → €2,022	1. Mait Mikusaar; (Basketball Player)	2. Lauri Linamägi; (Security Guard)	7. Romet Leimann; (Bus Fanatic)	6. Tambet Kikas; (Summer Getaway)	5. Marit Kesa; (Lie Detector)	3. Meeli Pärna; (Dancing Mom)	4. Kätlin Kits; Medical Student
10	1 May 2022	Laura Põldvere	Jadvi and Mireen → €2,022	6. Evelina Lebedeva; (Technician)	2. Rain Avarmaa; (Digital Artist)	4. Aule Urb; (Craftsman)	1. Tõnis Sarap; (Newscaster)	5. Urmas Mägi; (Freelancer)	7. Merilyn Õis; (Volleyball Player)	3. Birgita Sillaots; Beautician
11	8 May 2022	Ott Lepland	Silja and Kene → €2,022	3. Kristiina Ivanova; (Hobby Baker)	1. Valeri Krasnov; (Machine Operator)	6. Andra Truuts; (Office Scum)	4. Priidu Aardam; (Islander)	5. Tõnis Hallaste; (Mad Scientist)	7. Polina Kuznetsova; (Air Traffic Controller)	2. Laura Vals; Construction Manager
12	15 May 2022	Synne Valtri	Anette and Ingrid → €2,022	5. Alo Helekivi; (Showman)	2. Mailika Sanin; (Milkman)	7. Eliise Nurgamaa; (Rescuer)	1. Rosanna Saul; (Cook)	4. Olev Mäe; (P.E. Teacher)	6. Enrique Sims; (Courier)	3. Sandra Vesseluha; Home Defender

=== Panelists ===
Legend:
Regular panelist
Guest panelist

Apps		Panelists in attendance (Sorted by first appearance, with episode designations)
g#	p#	Panelists in attendance (Sorted by first appearance, with episode designations)
11	1	Grete Kuld (1–4, 6–12)
10	1	Andrei Zevakin (1–10)
9	2	Evelin Võigemast (1–6, 10–12); Mart Juur (1–7, 11–12)
7	1	Estoni Kohver (5miinust) (1, 5, 8–12)
1	4	Tõnis Niinemets (5); Anu Saagim (7); Jüri Butšakov (8); Indrek Vaheoja (9)

== Reception ==
Legend:
Highest rated episode
Lowest rated episode

No.	Title	Air date	Timeslot (EET)	Live			Live + VOSDAL			Consolidated		
No.	Title	Air date	Timeslot (EET)	Rank	Points	Total	Rank	Points	Total	Rank	Points	Total
1	"Tanel Padar"	27 February 2022	Sunday, 20:05	Not reported			8	13.2%	156,000	5	14.8%	174,000
2	"Anne Veski"	6 March 2022	Sunday, 20:05	5	12.2%	144,000	6	14.4%	170,000	4	16.2%	192,000
3	"Jüri Pootsmann"	13 March 2022	Sunday, 20:05	Not reported						13	11.8%	139,000
4	"Koit Toome"	20 March 2022	Sunday, 20:05	Not reported						6	13.4%	158,000
5	"Nele-Liis Vaiksoo"	27 March 2022	Sunday, 20:05	Not reported			6	12.5%	148,000	5	14.6%	173,000
6	"Silver Laas"	3 April 2022	Sunday, 20:05	Not reported			7	11.1%	132,000	4	13.4%	158,000
7	"Eda-Ines Etti"	10 April 2022	Sunday, 20:05	Not reported						8	11.8%	139,000
8	"Elina Born"	17 April 2022	Sunday, 20:05	9	8.8%	104,000	7	10.8%	128,000	3	13%	154,000
9	"Getter Jaani"	24 April 2022	Sunday, 20:05	6	9%	106,000	5	11.2%	132,000	3	13.1%	155,000
10	"Laura Põldvere"	1 May 2022	Sunday, 20:05	1	12.7%	150,000	1	15.5%	183,000	1	16.5%	195,000
11	"Ott Lepland"	8 May 2022	Sunday, 20:05	6	8.8%	104,000	6	10.7%	126,000	3	12.6%	149,000
12	"Synne Valtri"	15 May 2022	Sunday, 20:05	6	12.2%	144,000	6	15.5%	183,000	5	16.3%	193,000
Special	"Biggest Surprises"	22 May 2022	Sunday, 20:05	10	7.2%	85,000	7	9%	106,000	6	9.7%	114,000

Source: Kantar Emor
