= Hope (Stefan song) =

2021 single by Stefan

Single by Stefan

from the album Hope
- Language: English
- Released: 4 December 2021
- Genre: Country and western, country pop
- Length: 3:04
- Label: Moonwalk
- Songwriters: Stefan Airapetjan; Karl-Ander Reismann

Stefan singles chronology
"Doomino" (2021)	"Hope" (2021)

Music video
- "Hope" on YouTube

Eurovision Song Contest 2022 entry
- Country: Estonia
- Artist: Stefan
- Language: English
- Composers: Stefan Airapetjan; Karl-Ander Reismann
- Lyricists: Stefan Airapetjan; Karl-Ander Reismann

Finals performance
- Semi-final result: 5th
- Semi-final points: 209
- Final result: 13th
- Final points: 141

Entry chronology
- ◄ "The Lucky One" (2021)
- "Bridges" (2023) ►

"Hope" is a song by Estonian-Armenian singer Stefan Airapetjan. The song represented Estonia in the Eurovision Song Contest 2022 in Turin, Italy after winning Eesti Laul 2022, Estonia's national final.

== Background ==
The music video for the song was filmed in the Tabernas Desert in Almería, Spain. According to Stefan, the song is about everlasting, neverending hope.

== Eurovision Song Contest ==
=== Eesti Laul 2022 ===
Eesti Laul 2022 was the fourteenth edition of the Estonian national selection Eesti Laul, which selected Estonia's entry for the Eurovision Song Contest 2022. The format of the competition included four quarter-finals on 20 November, 27 November, 4 December and 11 December 2021, two semi-finals on 3 and 5 February 2022 and a final on 12 February 2022. Ten songs competed in each quarter-final and five from each quarter-final qualified to the semi-finals. Ten songs competed in each semi-final and the top five from each semi-final qualified to complete the ten song lineup in the final. The results of the quarter-finals were determined solely by public televoting for the first three qualifiers and votes from a professional jury for the fourth and fifth qualifiers, while the results of the semi-finals were determined by the 50/50 combination of jury and public voting for the first qualifiers and a second round of public televoting for the remaining qualifiers. The winning song in the final was selected over two rounds of voting: the first round results selected the top three songs via the 50/50 combination of jury and public voting, while the second round (superfinal) determined the winner solely by public televoting.

On 2 September 2021, ERR opened the submission period for artists and composers to submit their entries up until 20 October 2021 through an online upload platform. Each artist and songwriter was able to submit a maximum of five entries. Foreign collaborations were allowed as long as one of the songwriters were Estonian and that there were a maximum of two foreign songwriters, one being the composer and one being the lyricist. A fee was also imposed on songs being submitted to the competition, with €50 for songs in the Estonian language and €100 for songs in other languages. 202 submissions were received by the deadline, of which 84 were in Estonian, and the others were in English, French, Spanish, Italian and an imaginary language. A 17-member jury panel consisting of Andi Raig, Bert Järvet, Eda-Ines Etti, Eric Kammiste, Heili Klandorf, Henri Laumets, Hugo Martin Maasikas, Jürgen Pärnsalu, Kadiah, Kaspar Viilup, Kerli Kivilaan, Lauri Laubre, Leonardo Romanello, Liis Lemsalu, Meelis Meri, Tarmo Hõbe and Thea Paluoja selected 40 quarter-finalists from the submissions and ten of the selected songs were announced each week on the ETV entertainment program Ringvaade, between 15 November 2021 and 7 December 2021.

The song would compete in the third quarter-final. Ten songs competed for three spots in the semi-finals with the outcome decided upon by a public televote. The remaining two qualifiers were decided by the votes from the jury panel. Stefan would qualify as a televote qualifier.

The song would then compete in the second semi-final. Five acts from the semi-final advanced to the final. The first four qualifiers were determined by a combined jury and public voting, while the remaining qualifier came from a second round of public televoting. Stefan would qualify as a first round jury and televote qualifier.

The song would compete in the final on 12 February 2022. An initial three superfinalists were determined by a combined jury and public voting, while the winner was decided from a second round of public televoting. Stefan would qualify from the first round, finishing first with 22 points. In the second round, Stefan would once again come first, earning 35,681 televotes, winning the contest.

=== At Eurovision ===
According to Eurovision rules, all nations with the exceptions of the host country and the "Big Five" (France, Germany, Italy, Spain and the United Kingdom) are required to qualify from one of two semi-finals in order to compete for the final; the top ten countries from each semi-final progress to the final. The European Broadcasting Union (EBU) split up the competing countries into six different pots based on voting patterns from previous contests, with countries with favourable voting histories put into the same pot. On 25 January 2022, an allocation draw was held which placed each country into one of the two semi-finals, as well as which half of the show they would perform in. Estonia was placed into the second semi-final, held on 12 May 2022, and performed in the second half of the show, in 12th place out of the 18 performing countries.

== Charts ==
=== Weekly charts ===
Weekly chart performance
Chart (2022)	Peak position
Estonia Airplay (Radiomonitor)	1
Iceland (Tónlistinn)	35
Lithuania (AGATA)	28
Netherlands (Single Tip)	20
Sweden (Sverigetopplistan)	87
UK Singles Downloads (Official Charts)	47

=== Year-end charts ===
Year-end chart performance
Chart (2025)	Position
Estonia Airplay (TopHit)	163
