= Inger (surname) =

Inger is a surname. It also has a given name version, Inger, which is mostly used in Norway. Notable people with the surname include:

- Archie Johnson Inger (1883–1954), American artist and author
- Manfred Inger (1907–1984), Austrian actor
- Robert F. Inger (1920–2019), American herpetologist
- Stella Inger (born 1983), American television journalist
