= Jaagup Tuisk =

Estonian pop singer

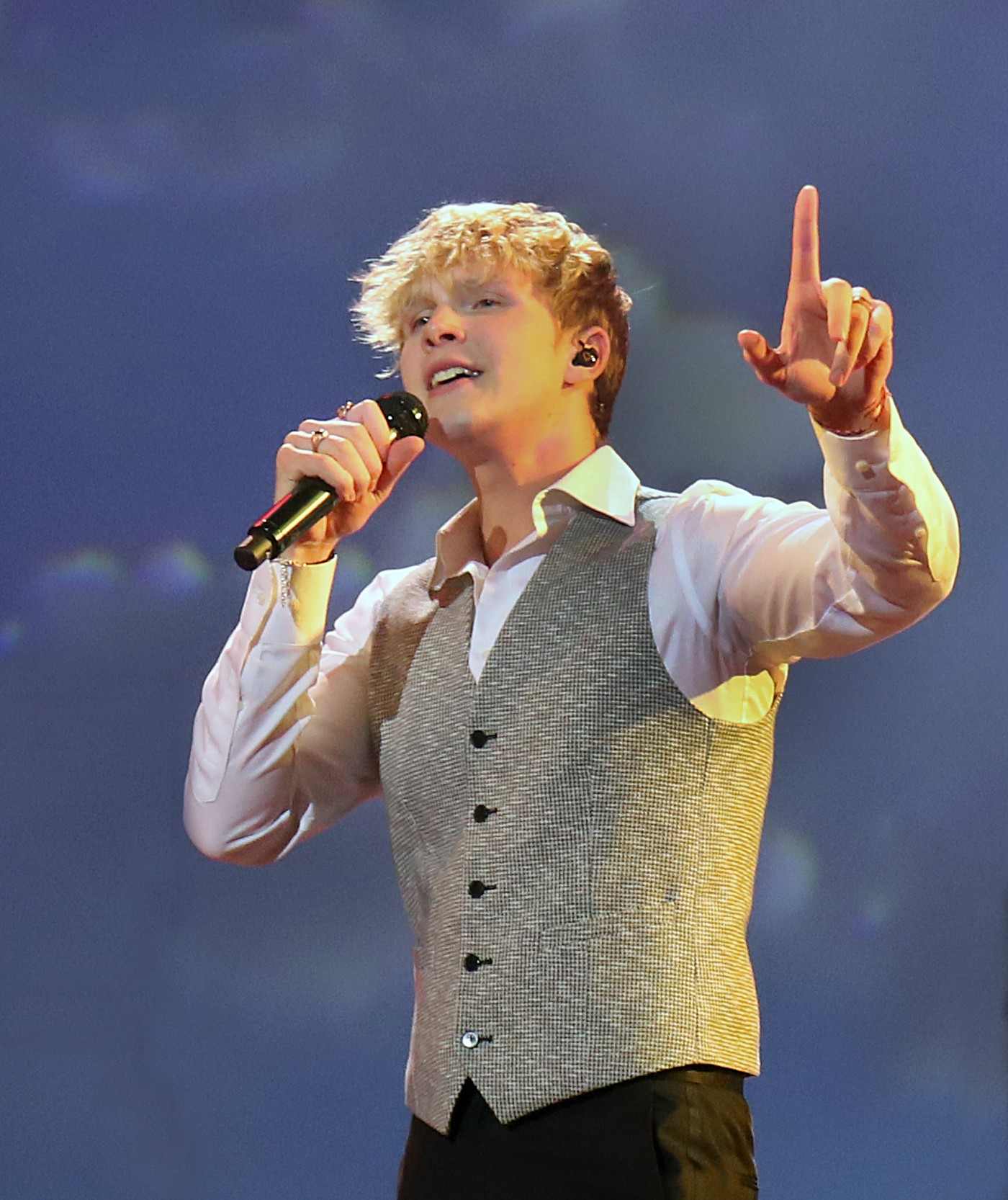
- Jaagup Tuisk performing at the Alexela Concert Hall in 2022

Background information
- Born: 1 August 2001 (age 25); Laagri, Estonia
- Genres: Pop
- Occupations: Singer; songwriter; music producer
- Instruments: Vocals; Piano; Guitar; Drums; Trumpet
- Years active: 2017–present
- Label: Made In Baltics

Jaagup Tuisk (born 1 August 2001) is an Estonian singer from Laagri.

== Musical career ==
In 2014 at the age of 12, he went on the "Kaks ja pool meest" concert tour with Uku Suviste and Kristjan Kasearu.

In 2018, Tuisk took part in the seventh season of the Estonian music television reality competition Eesti otsib superstaari, where he finished in fifth place.

He participated in Eesti Laul 2020 with the song "Beautiful Lie". He qualified and came in first place in the first round of the final, but in the superfinal he came in second place behind Uku Suviste with "What Love Is".

On 15 November 2021, it was announced that Tuisk will return to the contest in the, 2022 edition with the song "Kui vaid". He participated in the first quarter final where the juries chose him as one of their qualifiers for the semi final, where he qualified to the final and came in tenth place.

== Discography ==
=== Singles ===
- 2018 – Käes Nüüd Aeg
- 2018 – Legendid oma loos
- 2019 – Hetkes
- 2019 – Beautiful Lie
- 2020 – Miinusprojekt
- 2020 – Bachata
- 2021 – Jää minuga
- 2021 – Kui vaid
- 2022 – Tuhk ja tolm (featuring Ines)

=== Extended plays ===
- 2021 – Teemantidest linn
- 2021 – Las mängib ta
- 2021 – Ma ju tean
