= Stefan Airapetjan =

Estonian singer and songwriter

Stefan Airapetjan Ստեֆան Հայրապետյան
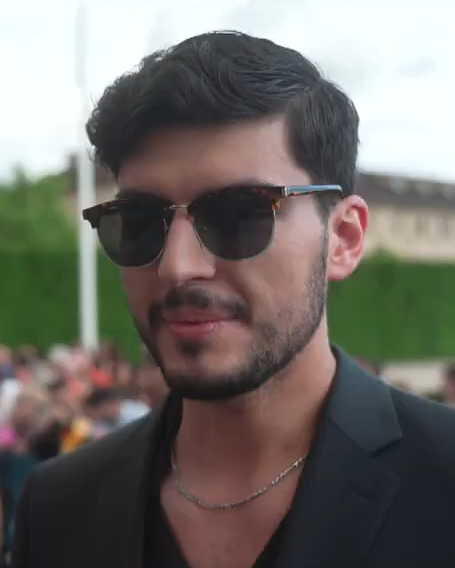
- Airapetjan in 2022

Background information
- Born: 24 December 1997 (age 28); Viljandi, Estonia
- Genres: Pop music
- Occupations: Singer, songwriter
- Years active: 2017–present
- Label: Moonwalk Records

Stefan Airapetjan (Armenian: Ստեֆան Հայրապետյան, romanized: Stefan Hayrapetyan; born 24 December 1997), known simply as Stefan, is an Estonian singer and songwriter, best known for winning the first edition of Maskis Laulja, the Estonian version of Masked Singer in 2020 and representing Estonia in the Eurovision Song Contest 2022 with the song "Hope", placing 13th in the final.

== Early life ==
Airapetjan was born and raised in Viljandi, Estonia as the son of Armenian immigrants. He has a sister named Stefania.

== Career ==
=== Early career ===
Airapetjan has been singing since his early childhood, with Hedi-Kai Pai his vocal coach, and won a number of contests. In 2010, he entered Laulukarussell, a singing competition for children organised by Eesti Rahvusringhääling, and reached the final.

=== 2018–2020: Eesti Laul and Maskis Laulja ===
Airapetjan entered the music competition Eesti Laul on four occasions, winning once. His first entry was in 2018 as part of a duo called Vajé with the song "Laura (Walk with Me)", finishing third in the superfinal. His first solo entry was in 2019 with the song "Without You", which won the jury vote in the grand final and qualified for the superfinal, finishing third. He then entered in 2020 with the song "By My Side", which finished seventh in the grand final.

In 2020, Airapetjan won as Aries (Estonian: Jäär) in the first edition of The Masked Singer. He made his way to the finals, where he was declared the winner of the competition.

Maskis Laulja performances and results
Episode	Song	Original artist	Result
1	"Fly Me to the Moon"	Frank Sinatra	Advanced
4	"für Oksana"	Nublu	Advanced
5	"Jailhouse Rock"	Elvis Presley	Advanced
6	"Human"	Rag'n'Bone Man	Advanced
7	"Take Me to Church"	Hozier	Advanced
8	"Chop Suey!"	System of a Down	Winner

=== 2022–present: Return to Eesti Laul and Eurovision ===
In 2022, Airapetjan participated in Eesti Laul 2022 with the song "Hope" and won, besting out 40 entries. The win earned him the right to represent Estonia in the Eurovision Song Contest 2022 in Turin. In the Eurovision Song Contest, he performed 12th in the second semi-final and placed 5th, which qualified him to the final. In the final, he finished 13th place overall with 141 points.

== Discography ==
=== Studio albums ===
List of studio albums, with selected details
Title	Details
Hope	Released: 30 November 2022; Label: Moonwalk; Formats: Digital download, streaming

=== Extended plays ===
List of extended plays, with selected details
Title	Details
Kiri külmkapi peal 2.0	Released: 23 May 2023; Label: Moonwalk; Formats: Digital download, streaming

=== Singles ===
==== As lead artist ====
Title	Year	Peak chart positions							Album or EP
Title	Year	EST Dom.	EST Air. (Note: The TopHit airplay chart for Estonia began publication in January 2023. Radiomonitor data is used for the peak positions from the earlier period.)	ICE	LTU	NLD Tip	SWE	UK Digital	Album or EP
"Without You"	2018	5	2	—	—	—	—	—	Hope
"Better Days"	2019	—	—	—	—	—	—	—	Hope
"We'll Be Fine"	2019	36	—	—	—	—	—	—	Hope
"By My Side"	2019	30	—	—	—	—	—	—	Hope
"Oh My God"	2020	—	—	—	—	—	—	—	Hope
"Let Me Know"	2020	—	—	—	—	—	—	—	Hope
"Doomino" (with Liis Lemsalu)	2021	*	—	—	—	—	—	—	Hope
"Hope"	2021	*	1	35	28	20	87	47	Hope
"Miraaž"	2022	*	2	—	—	—	—	—	Hope
"Kiri külmkapi peal"	2022	*	—	—	—	—	—	—	Hope
"Kiri külmkapi peal" (version with Lenna)	2023	*	42	—	—	—	—	—	Non-album singles
"Seotud käed"	2023	*	45	—	—	—	—	—	Non-album singles
"Katkine tee"	2024	*	58	—	—	—	—	—	Non-album singles
"Purjetuul" (with Reket)	2024	*	5	—	—	—	—	—	Non-album singles
"Jackpot" (with Liis Lemsalu)	2025	*	5	—	—	—	—	—	Non-album singles
"Eiffel"	2025	*	7	—	—	—	—	—	Non-album singles
"Langevarjuna"	2026	*	14	—	—	—	—	—	Non-album singles
"—" denotes a recording that did not chart or was not released in that territory. "*" denotes that the chart did not exist at that time.

==== As featured artist ====
Title	Year	Album or EP
"Headlights" (Wateva featuring Stefan)	2021	Disposable Society
"Klasnie kraski" (Sander Mölder featuring Stefan and Fredi)	2021	Tiks 086

==== As part of Vajé ====
Title	Year	Album or EP
"Soldier"	2017	Non-album single
"Laura (Walk with Me)"	2017	Non-album single
"Home"	2018	Non-album single

=== Other charted songs ===
Title	Year	Peak chart position	Album or EP
Title	Year	EST Air.	Album or EP
"Better Days" (Remix version)	2019	77	Non-album single

== Awards and nominations ==
Year	Award	Category	Nominee(s)	Result	Ref.
2020	Estonian Music Awards	Pop Artist of the Year	Himself	Nominated	
2023	Estonian Music Awards	Pop Artist of the Year	Himself	Won	
2023	Estonian Music Awards	Male Artist of the Year	Himself	Won	
2023	Estonian Music Awards	Artist of the Year	Himself	Won	
2023	Estonian Music Awards	Song of the Year	"Hope"	Won	
2023	Estonian Music Awards	Album of the Year	Hope	Nominated	
2023	Estonian Music Awards	Debut Album of the Year	Hope	Nominated	

== Notes ==
Awards and achievements
Preceded by Uku Suviste with "The Lucky One"	Estonia in the Eurovision Song Contest; 2022	Succeeded by Alika with "Bridges"
