= INGER (singer) =

Estonian singer, songwriter, and footballer (born 1999)

Inger Fridolin (INGER)
- Born: Inger Fridolin; 11 March 1999 (age 27); Estonia
- Occupations: Singer; songwriter; footballer
- Instruments: Vocals; percussion; ukulele; guitar
- Years active: 2017–present
- Partner: Karmen King
- Website: soundslikeinger.com

Inger Fridolin (stage name INGER); born 11 March 1999) is an Estonian singer, songwriter, and footballer.

== Early life and education ==
Inger was born on 11 March 1999. Their mother is the choral conductor Janne Fridolin. Inger's mother named them after Mats Traat's novel Inger. Growing up, their mother kept chickens at home.

Inger first studied at Viimsi Secondary School (2007–2011). During the same period, they studied percussion at the Viimsi Music School. From 2011, they studied percussion at the Tallinn Music High School. From 2016, they studied in the multimedia stream at Tallinn 32nd Secondary School, graduating in 2019.

In 2020, they began studying recreation management at Tallinn University and graduated with a Bachelor's degree in 2023.

== Career ==
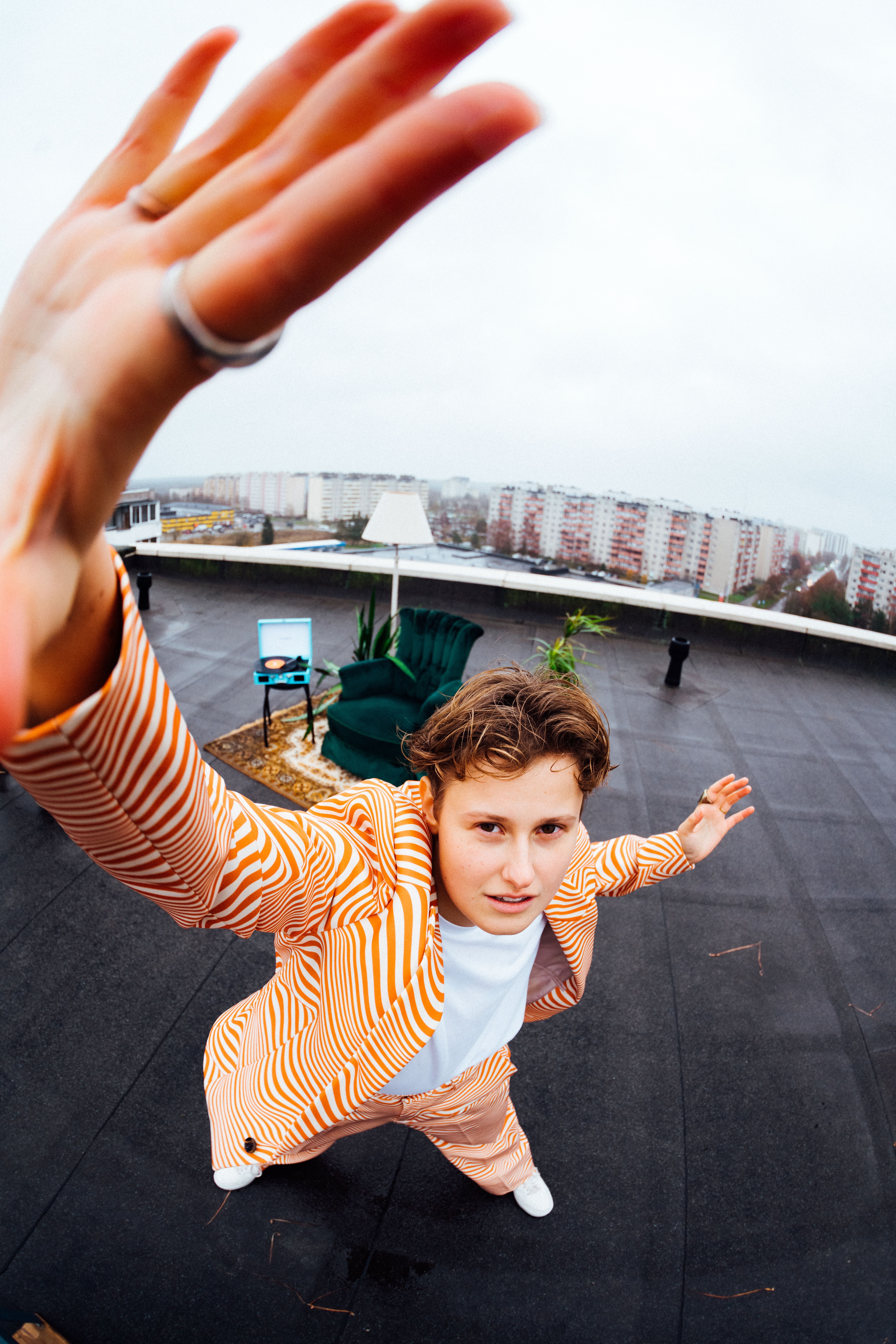
A promotional photo of INGER for Eesti Laul 2023

=== Musical career ===
Fridolin came to public attention as a musician in the autumn of 2017 when they participated in the Noortebänd 2017 competition, reaching the final. In 2017, they received the Radio 2 Demo of the Year award for the song "Again." Fridolin participated in the Eesti Laul 2019 competition, where they also reached the final, finishing 6th with the song "Coming Home". In the same year, they took 2nd place in the final of the German Songwriting Awards. In 2020, Inger participated in Eesti Laul 2020 and achieved 8th place with the song "Only Dream." They were also selected as the New Artist of the Week for the international A&R Worldwide newsletter.

In 2018, Inger performed at the Intsikurmu Festival. In 2019, they were invited to participate in the MUSEXPO music conference in Los Angeles, USA, where artists such as Katy Perry, LMFAO, and Jessie J had previously performed. In the same year, they performed at the Westernpop Festival in the Netherlands and the Chengdu International Sister Cities Youth Music Festival in China.

In 2020, Inger performed at Sofarsounds in Latvia and at the Intsikurmu and Valgeranna festivals in Estonia. In 2022, Inger performed at the Norden Festival in Germany. Between 2020 and 2022, also Inger was the host of the Koolitants Festival.

In 2022, Fridolin released their first EP, "Higher Self," featuring five tracks. On 22 April 2025, they released their full-length Estonian-language debut album, Armastatuna. Themes of social non-conformity are explored in their 2026 double single "Sa mind ei kuule" (You Don't Hear Me) and "Katki" (Broken).

An Eesti Laul interview with INGER in 2019

In 2023, Fridolin appeared in the final of Eesti Laul, the national song contest to decide the country's Eurovision pick. They were the second to perform in the line-up and played their song "Awaiting You". They placed in 7th place in the national competition.

=== Sports career ===
Inger began football training at the age of six. They have represented the Estonian girls' national youth teams 24 times, scoring two goals. Inger played in the Estonian women's leagues for Tallinna FC Flora II and the national youth team during 2015 and 2016. They have subsequently worked as a coach at the Viimsi Martin Reim football school and FC Flora.

== Discography ==
Year	Single	Record label
2018	"Again"	INGER
2018	"Notice you"	INGER
2018	"Storm" ft. Avoid Dave	INGER
2018	"I'm Alright"	TuneBase
2018	"Coming home"	TuneBase
2019	"Willie"	Made in Baltics
2019	"Beautiful day"	INGER
2019	"Only dream"	INGER
2020	"Playing games"	INGER
2021	"WTF" ft. manna	INGER, manna
2022	"who i really am"	INGER
2022	"Awaiting You"	INGER
2023	"Nähtamatu"	INGER
2023	"Põled kui suvi"	INGER
2024	"Öösegadus"	INGER
2024	"jah, sa oled see"	INGER
2024	"head aega"	INGER, EiK
2024	"Kuniks me ei muutu"	INGER
2025	"kuues meel"	INGER
2025	"Tantsin iseendaga"	INGER
2025	"kollane maja"	INGER
2026	"Sa mind ei kuule" / "Katki"	INGER

Year	Album	Record label
2022	Higher Self (EP)	INGER
2025	Armastatuna	INGER

INGER in 2026

== Television work ==
They have participated in the series "MasterChef Eesti" and "Kalamaja Blues".

== Personal life ==
Inger is a guitar and ukulele teacher at Rahumäe Basic School.

Inger's partner is Karmen King.

Inger has identified as gender fluid.

Inger has ADHD.
