= Mart Juur =

Estonian humorist and journalist

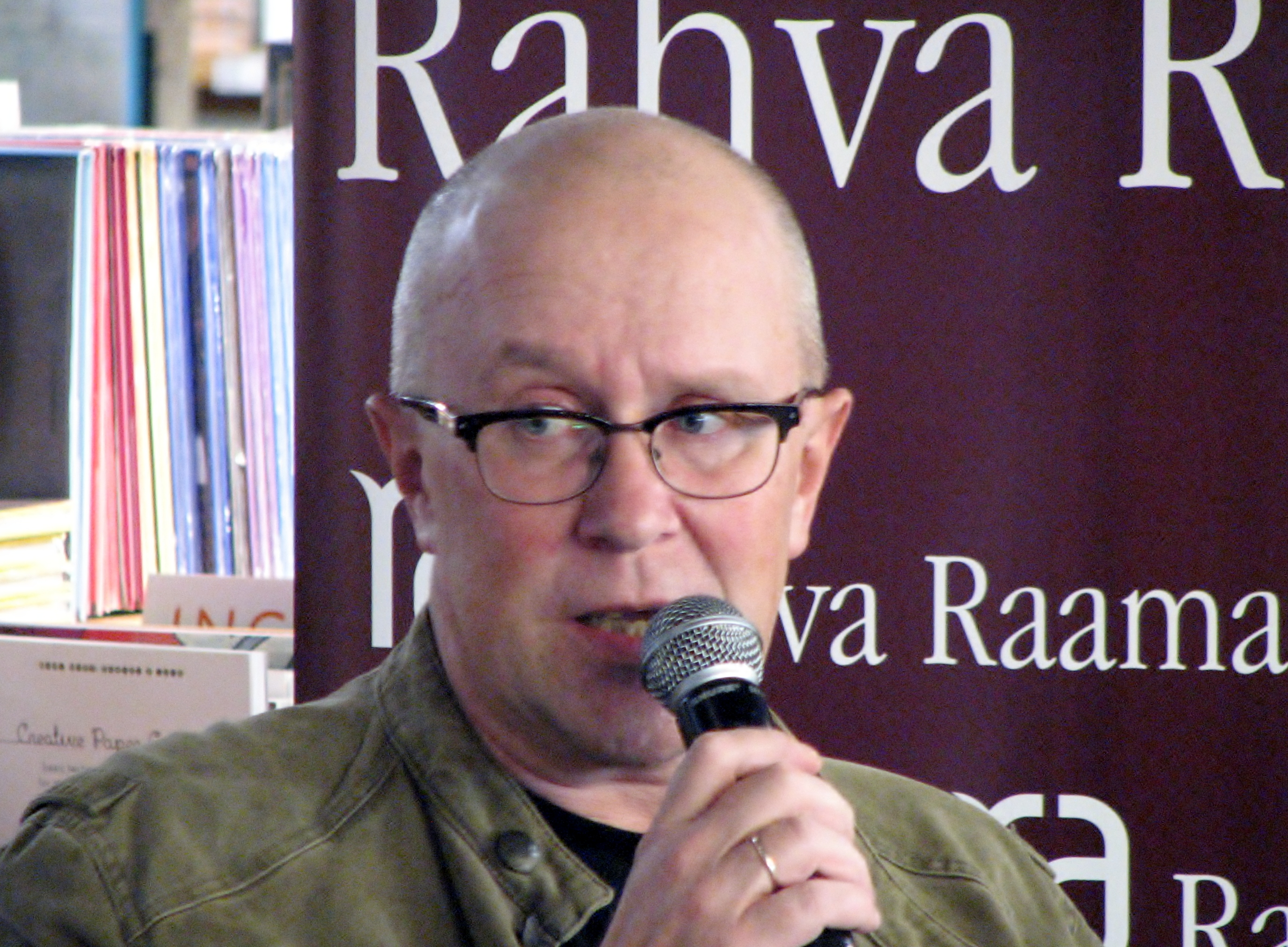
Mart Juur

Mart Juur (born 29 September 1964 in Tartu) is an Estonian writer, humorist, journalist, music critic, editor and television presenter.

He has been the presenter of several television programs, such as Rahva oma kaitse and Ärapanija.

His daughter is a musician and an environmental activist Maria Minerva.

== Selected works ==
- Jamasuutra (1991)
- Eesti ajakirjanduse kogutud pärlid Vol. 2 (1998)
- Lollipop (1999)
- Arkaadi A. (2001)
- Huumori kool (2008)
- Pane eesti peale tagasi (2008)
- Naeruklubi (2010)
- 101 Eesti popmuusika albumit
- Hea tuju raamat (2018)
