= Estonia in the Eurovision Song Contest 2025 =

- Eurovision Song Contest 2025
- Participating broadcaster: Eesti Rahvusringhääling (ERR)
- Country: Estonia
- Selection process: Eesti Laul 2025
- Selection date: 15 February 2025

Competing entry
- Song: "Espresso Macchiato"
- Artist: Tommy Cash
- Songwriters: Tomas Tammemets; Johannes Naukkarinen

Placement
- Semi-final result: Qualified (5th, 113 points)
- Final result: 3rd, 356 points

Participation chronology

Estonia was represented at the Eurovision Song Contest 2025 with the song "Espresso Macchiato", written by Tomas Tammemets and Johannes Naukkarinen, and performed by Tammemets himself under his stage name Tommy Cash. The Estonian participating broadcaster, Eesti Rahvusringhääling (ERR), organised the national final Eesti Laul 2025 in order to select its entry for the contest.

== Background ==
Prior to the 2025 contest, Eesti Televisioon (ETV) until 2007, and Eesti Rahvusringhääling (ERR) since 2008, had participated in the Eurovision Song Contest representing Estonia twenty-nine times since ETV's first entry in 1994, winning the contest in 2001 with the song "Everybody" performed by Tanel Padar, Dave Benton and 2XL. Following the introduction of semi-finals in 2004, Estonia has, to this point, managed to qualify to the final on ten occasions, including in 2024, when "(Nendest) narkootikumidest ei tea me (küll) midagi" performed by 5miinust and Puuluup ultimately placed 20th in the final.

As part of its duties as participating broadcaster, ERR organises the selection of its entry in the Eurovision Song Contest and broadcasts the event in the country. Since its debut, the Estonian broadcaster had organised national finals that featured a competition among multiple artists and songs in order to select its entry for the contest. The Eesti Laul competition has been organised since 2009, and on 16 September 2024, ERR revealed the rules and regulations of the 2025 edition.

== Before Eurovision ==
=== Eesti Laul 2025 ===
Eesti Laul 2025 was the 17th edition of the national selection Eesti Laul, organised by ERR to select its entry for the Eurovision Song Contest 2025. The competition consisted of a 16-song final on 15 February 2025 at the Unibet Arena in Tallinn, and was hosted by Eda-Ines Etti and Karl "Korea" Kivastik. The show was broadcast on Eesti Televisioon (ETV), on ETV2 with Estonian sign language translation and on ETV+ with Russian commentary by Aleksandr Hobotov and Julia Kalenda, via radio on Raadio 2, as well as online at the broadcaster's streaming platform Jupiter and official website err.ee.

==== Competing entries ====
On 16 September 2024, ERR opened the submission period for artists and composers to submit their entries up until 21 October 2024 through an online upload platform. Each artist and songwriter was only able to submit a maximum of five entries. Foreign collaborations were allowed as long as one of the songwriters was Estonian. A fee was also imposed on songs being submitted to the competition, with €50 for songs in the Estonian language and €100 for songs in other languages; both of the fees were doubled for entries submitted from 19 October 2024. 175 submissions were received by the deadline, of which 65 were in Estonian and the remaining 110 were in English, Italian, German and French. A 34-member jury panel selected 15 finalists and an additional 20 songs for an online wildcard selection from the submissions. Prior to selecting the 20 wildcard entries, ERR requested permission from artists who had submitted songs to participate in the wildcard round, of which 137 (out of 160) submissions agreed to. The rejected 117 submissions were uploaded to the Raadio 2 website on 15 December 2024.

One of the finalists, Räpina Jack featuring Kaisa Ling, was announced during the ETV entertainment program Ringvaade on 1 November 2024, while an additional finalist, Tuuli Rand, was announced on 4 November 2024 during the Raadio 2 program R2 hommik. The remaining selected finalists were subsequently announced on 4 and 5 November 2024 during Ringvaade. For the online wildcard, the public was able to vote for their favourite entry on the Raadio 2 website between 28 December 2024 and 5 January 2024. The winner, "Tantsin veel" performed by Marta Lotta, was announced on 6 January 2025 during R2 hommik.

Among the competing artists were previous Eurovision Song Contest entrants Anna Sahlene, who represented Estonia in 2002, as a finalist as well as Gerli Padar, who represented Estonia in 2007, and Laura Põldvere, who represented Estonia in 2005 and 2017, as online wildcard entrants. An-Marlen, Andrei Zevakin, Elysa, Frants Tikerpuu, Hain Hoppe (member of Räpina Jack), Janek, Joelle, Minimal Wind and Tuuli Rand have all competed in previous editions of Eesti Laul. Janek's entry was written by Kjetil Mørland, who represented Norway in 2015 with Debrah Scarlett.

Selection jury members
- Alice Aleksandridi
- Alika
- Allan Roosileht
- Andi Aus
- Andry Padar
- Anneli Pilpak
- Gita Siimpoeg
- Heini Vaikmaa
- Henri Laumets
- Indrek Sarrap
- Jana Hallas
- Johanna Mängel
- Jürgen Pärnsalu
- Jüri Pootsmann
- Karl-Ander Reismann
- Kohver
- Kristo Veinberg
- Maian Kärmas
- Magnus Müürsepp
- Maris Järva
- Maris Kõrvits
- Mihkel Mattisen
- Owe Petersell
- Pille-Riin Karro
- Piret Krumm
- Raivo Tafenau
- Robert Kõrvits
- Saara Pius
- Siim Aimla
- Sven Lõhmus
- Tanja Mihhailova-Saar
- Tarvo Mölder
- Ülar-Johannes Palm

Online wildcard – 6 January 2025
| Artist | Song | Songwriter(s) | Place |
|---|---|---|---|
| AG and Laura Põldvere | "Pimepäev" | Carl Deion Jõekallas; Mario Järvet; Silver Orissaar; Vahur Valgmaa | 2 |
| Antsud Metal Project | "Ei enam" | Aile Alveus; Antsud; Emmanouil Tselepis | 10 |
| Bel-Etage Swingorkester | "Mind kõikjal näed" | Mart Sander | — |
| Carol Suurevälja | "Purpose" | Carol Suurevälja; Claus Pener | 9 |
| Cecilia | "Rollercoaster" | Cecilia-Martina Mägi; Sander Sadam | 4 |
| Ela | "Südamés" | Triin Kadaja | — |
| Elina Martinson | "Sinitihane" | Tuuli Pruul | — |
| Everfall | "Stories We Hold" | Claus Pener; Martin Vist | 5 |
| Felix Enghult | "More than Innocent" | Felix Enghult; Mattias Athlei; Stig Rästa; Teven Aavik | — |
| Gerli Padar | "Võõraks jääd" | Peter Põder; Allan Kasuk; Stella Seim; Gerli Padar | — |
| Horror Dance Squad | "The Rebel Reborn" | Henri Kuusk; Ian Robert Karell; Indrek Ulp; Karl Mesipuu; Mikk Peetrimägi | 3 |
| Kozy | "Jääb nii (tahan, et tead)" | Erkki Reeman; Kaarel Kose | — |
| Marianne Leibur | "Pluto and Mars" | Ann Mäekivi; Robert Rebane | — |
| Marta Lotta | "Tantsin veel" | Johannes Pihlak; Marta Lotta Kukk; Taavi-Peeter Liiv | 1 |
| Merwis | "Aknal langevaid pisaraid" | Peter Põder | 7 |
| Mick Pedaja | "Sound of Pines" | Mick Pedaja; Sergio Llopis | 8 |
| Sarah Murray | "High on Myself" | Liis Hainla; Sander Sadam; Sarah Murray | — |
| Silver Jusilo | "Turn Back Time" | Markus Palo; Silver Jusilo | — |
| Sten-Olle | "Noorex" | Sten-Olle Moldau | — |
| Synne Valtri | "Butterflies & Bees" | Johannes Lõhmus; Synne Valtri | 6 |

Eesti Laul 2025 participating entries
| Artist | Song | Songwriter(s) |
|---|---|---|
| An-Marlen | "Külm" | Frederik Mustonen; Ingel Marlen Mikk; Maria Vainumägi |
| Andrei Zevakin feat. Karita | "Ma ei tea sind" | Andrei Zevakin; Liina Ariadne Pedanik; Martti Hallik |
| Anna Sahlene | "Love Me Low" | David Lindgren Zacharias; Bobby Ljunggren; Michaela Stridbeck; Anna Sahlin; Dagmar Oja; Kaire Vilgats |
| Ant | "Tomorrow Never Comes" | Ant Nurhan; Kim Wennerström; Merili Käsper |
| Elysa | "The Last to Know" | Simon Peyron; Angelino Markenhorn; Julie Aagaard; Elisa Kolk |
| Felin | "Solo Anthem" | Paul Rey; Gevin Niglas; Johanna Ekholm; Elin Blom Etoall |
| Frants Tikerpuu | "Trouble" | Frants Tikerpuu |
| Gem98 | "Psycho" | Richard Sepajõe; Gevin Niglas; Karl Birnbaum; Frederik Küüts |
| Janek | "Frozen" | Janek Valgepea; Kjetil Mørland |
| Johanna Elise | "Eyes Don't Lie" | Timo Vendt; Johanna-Elise Kabe |
| Marta Lotta | "Tantsin veel" | Johannes Pihlak; Marta Lotta Kukk; Taavi-Peeter Liiv |
| Minimal Wind | "Armageddon" | Elisabeth Tiffany Lepik; Taavi-Hans Kõlar; Paula Pajusaar; Velle Tamme; Robin Kiisholts; Katri Merily Reimand |
| Räpina Jack feat. Kaisa Ling | "Tule" | Kill Kaare; Kaisa Ling |
| Stereo Terror | "Prty Till the End of the World" | Lauri Hämäläinen; Heigo Anto |
| Tommy Cash | "Espresso Macchiato" | Tomas Tammemets; Johannes Naukkarinen |
| Tuuli Rand | "REM" | Cecilia-Martina Mägi; Sander Sadam |

==== Final ====
The final took place on 15 February 2025. Sixteen songs competed during the show and the winner was selected over two rounds of voting. In the first round, a jury (50%) and public televote (50%) determined the top three entries to proceed to the superfinal. In the superfinal, "Espresso Macchiato" performed by Tommy Cash was selected as the winner entirely by a public televote. The jury panel that voted in the first round of the final consisted of Regína Ósk (Icelandic singer), William Lee Adams (American journalist, founder of Wiwibloggs), Juris Matuzelis (Latvian television and entertainment director), Ramūnas Zilnys (pop music director and journalist at the Lithuanian National Broadcasting), Marvin Dietmann (Austrian television and entertainment director), Ene Rämmeld (Estonian actress), Alexandra Rotan (Norwegian singer) and Victor Crone (Swedish musician). In addition to the performances of the competing entries, host Eda-Ines Etti (who represented Estonia in 2000), 5miinust and Puuluup (both of which represented Estonia in 2024) with Florian Wahl, singer Kitty Florentine, and the bands Cartoon, Dagö and Nordic Pulse performed as interval acts.

Final – 15 February 2025
| R/O | Artist | Song | Jury | | Televote | | Total | Place |
| R/O | Artist | Song | Votes | Points | Votes | Points | Total | Place |
|---|---|---|---|---|---|---|---|---|
| 1 | Ant | "Tomorrow Never Comes" | 32 | 11 | 2,887 | 14 | 25 | 5 |
| 2 | Stereo Terror | "Prty Till the End of the World" | 17 | 6 | 257 | 2 | 8 | 15 |
| 3 | Janek | "Frozen" | 58 | 14 | 1,393 | 12 | 26 | 4 |
| 4 | Räpina Jack feat. Kaisa Ling | "Tule" | 6 | 2 | 576 | 7 | 9 | 13 |
| 5 | Johanna Elise | "Eyes Don't Lie" | 16 | 5 | 455 | 5 | 10 | 12 |
| 6 | Felin | "Solo Anthem" | 34 | 12 | 626 | 9 | 21 | 6 |
| 7 | Elysa | "The Last to Know" | 25 | 9 | 600 | 8 | 17 | 8 |
| 8 | Gem98 | "Psycho" | 28 | 10 | 356 | 3 | 13 | 11 |
| 9 | An-Marlen | "Külm" | 68 | 15 | 1,811 | 13 | 28 | 3 |
| 10 | Frants Tikerpuu | "Trouble" | 20 | 7 | 1,389 | 11 | 18 | 7 |
| 11 | Anna Sahlene | "Love Me Low" | 15 | 4 | 365 | 4 | 8 | 14 |
| 12 | Tuuli Rand | "REM" | 3 | 1 | 223 | 1 | 2 | 16 |
| 13 | Minimal Wind | "Armageddon" | 23 | 8 | 462 | 6 | 14 | 9 |
| 14 | Andrei Zevakin feat. Karita | "Ma ei tea sind" | 35 | 13 | 5,233 | 15 | 28 | 2 |
| 15 | Tommy Cash | "Espresso Macchiato" | 75 | 16 | 23,625 | 16 | 32 | 1 |
| 16 | Marta Lotta | "Tantsin veel" | 9 | 3 | 1,132 | 10 | 13 | 10 |

Superfinal – 15 February 2025
| Artist | Song | Televote | Place |
|---|---|---|---|
| An-Marlen | "Külm" | 3,634 | 3 |
| Andrei Zevakin feat. Karita | "Ma ei tea sind" | 4,334 | 2 |
| Tommy Cash | "Espresso Macchiato" | 41,414 | 1 |

Detailed jury votes
| R/O | Song | R. Ósk | W. L. Adams | J. Matuzelis | R. Zilnys | M. Dietmann | E. Rämmeld | A. Rotan | V. Crone | Total |
|---|---|---|---|---|---|---|---|---|---|---|
| 1 | "Tomorrow Never Comes" | 2 | 3 | 6 | 7 | 7 | | 7 | | 32 |
| 2 | "Prty Till the End of the World" | 6 | 6 | | | | | 5 | | 17 |
| 3 | "Frozen" | 10 | 8 | 10 | 10 | 4 | 7 | 8 | 1 | 58 |
| 4 | "Tule" | | | 1 | | | 2 | | 3 | 6 |
| 5 | "Eyes Don't Lie" | | | | | 5 | | 4 | 7 | 16 |
| 6 | "Solo Anthem" | 12 | | 4 | 5 | 6 | | 2 | 5 | 34 |
| 7 | "The Last to Know" | | 2 | 2 | 1 | 3 | 5 | 6 | 6 | 25 |
| 8 | "Psycho" | | 12 | | | | 6 | | 10 | 28 |
| 9 | "Külm" | 4 | 7 | 7 | 8 | 12 | 12 | 10 | 8 | 68 |
| 10 | "Trouble" | 1 | 1 | | 4 | 1 | 10 | 3 | | 20 |
| 11 | "Love Me Low" | 5 | | 5 | 3 | | | | 2 | 15 |
| 12 | "REM" | | | | | | 3 | | | 3 |
| 13 | "Armageddon" | | 4 | 3 | 2 | 8 | 1 | 1 | 4 | 23 |
| 14 | "Ma ei tea sind" | 8 | 5 | 8 | 6 | | 8 | | | 35 |
| 15 | "Espresso Macchiato" | 7 | 10 | 12 | 12 | 10 | | 12 | 12 | 75 |
| 16 | "Tantsin veel" | 3 | | | | 2 | 4 | | | 9 |

== At Eurovision ==
The Eurovision Song Contest took place at St. Jakobshalle in Basel, Switzerland, and consisted of two semi-finals held on the respective dates of 13 and 15 May, and the final on 17 May 2025. During the allocation draw held on 28 January 2025, Estonia was drawn to compete in the first semi-final, performing in the first half of the show.

Estonia qualified for the final, finishing in 5th place with 113 points. During the final, Estonia performed in the 3rd position, following Luxembourg and preceding Israel. In the end Estonia finished in 3rd place with 356 points, finishing in 9th place in the jury voting with 98 points and in 2nd place in the televote with 258 points, their best result since 2002.

=== Voting ===
==== Points awarded to Estonia ====
Points awarded to Estonia (Semi-final 1)
| Score | Televote |
|---|---|
| 12 points | Croatia |
| 10 points | Azerbaijan; San Marino (Note: San Marino uses a jury in the semi-finals.) |
| 8 points | Albania; Cyprus; Italy; Poland |
| 7 points | |
| 6 points | Iceland; Netherlands; Norway; Portugal; Sweden |
| 5 points | |
| 4 points | Belgium; Rest of the World; Spain |
| 3 points | Switzerland; Ukraine |
| 2 points | |
| 1 point | Slovenia |

Points awarded to Estonia (Final)
| Score | Televote | Jury |
|---|---|---|
| 12 points | Armenia; Croatia; Latvia; Malta; Serbia | |
| 10 points | Israel; Lithuania; Montenegro; Poland | Belgium; Italy |
| 8 points | Austria; Azerbaijan; Finland; Georgia; Greece; Netherlands; Sweden | |
| 7 points | Cyprus; Iceland; Italy; Norway; San Marino; Slovenia; Spain | Azerbaijan; Lithuania; San Marino; Slovenia |
| 6 points | Australia; Czechia; Denmark; Ireland; United Kingdom | |
| 5 points | Albania; Luxembourg | Croatia; Switzerland; Ukraine |
| 4 points | Germany | Finland; Norway |
| 3 points | | Australia; Austria; Iceland; Luxembourg; Malta; Portugal; Serbia; United Kingdom |
| 2 points | Belgium; Rest of the World; Switzerland; Ukraine | Armenia |
| 1 point | Portugal | Latvia |

==== Points awarded by Estonia ====
Points awarded by Estonia (Semi-final 1)
| Score | Televote |
|---|---|
| 12 points | Sweden |
| 10 points | Netherlands |
| 8 points | Ukraine |
| 7 points | Iceland |
| 6 points | Portugal |
| 5 points | Norway |
| 4 points | San Marino |
| 3 points | Slovenia |
| 2 points | Albania |
| 1 point | Belgium |

Points awarded by Estonia (Final)
| Score | Televote | Jury |
|---|---|---|
| 12 points | Sweden | Switzerland |
| 10 points | Finland | Finland |
| 8 points | Latvia | Sweden |
| 7 points | Italy | Austria |
| 6 points | Ukraine | France |
| 5 points | Iceland | United Kingdom |
| 4 points | Netherlands | Italy |
| 3 points | Germany | Latvia |
| 2 points | Israel | Poland |
| 1 point | Lithuania | Netherlands |

==== Detailed voting results ====
Each participating broadcaster assembles a five-member jury panel consisting of music industry professionals who are citizens of the country they represent. Each jury, and individual jury member, is required to meet a strict set of criteria regarding professional background, as well as diversity in gender and age. No member of a national jury was permitted to be related in any way to any of the competing acts in such a way that they cannot vote impartially and independently. The individual rankings of each jury member as well as the nation's televoting results were released shortly after the grand final.

The following members comprised the Estonian jury:

- Indrek Sarrap
- Ott Lepland (represented Estonia in the Eurovision Song Contest 2012)
- Owe Petersell
- Elina Nechayeva (represented Estonia in the Eurovision Song Contest 2018)

Alika was initially supposed to be a juror but her ranking was reportedly removed due to her sharing opinions on several songs online, contravening the rules.

Detailed voting results from Estonia (Semi-final 1)
| R/O | Country | Televote | |
| R/O | Country | Rank | Points |
|---|---|---|---|
| 01 | Iceland | 4 | 7 |
| 02 | Poland | 13 | |
| 03 | Slovenia | 8 | 3 |
| 04 | Estonia | | |
| 05 | Ukraine | 3 | 8 |
| 06 | Sweden | 1 | 12 |
| 07 | Portugal | 5 | 6 |
| 08 | Norway | 6 | 5 |
| 09 | Belgium | 10 | 1 |
| 10 | Azerbaijan | 11 | |
| 11 | San Marino | 7 | 4 |
| 12 | Albania | 9 | 2 |
| 13 | Netherlands | 2 | 10 |
| 14 | Croatia | 12 | |
| 15 | Cyprus | 14 | |

Detailed voting results from Estonia (Final)
| R/O | Country | Jury | | | | | | Televote | |
| R/O | Country | Juror A | Juror B | Juror C | Juror D | Rank | Points | Rank | Points |
|---|---|---|---|---|---|---|---|---|---|
| 01 | Norway | 10 | 16 | 23 | 22 | 22 | | 12 | |
| 02 | Luxembourg | 3 | 17 | 25 | 23 | 13 | | 18 | |
| 03 | Estonia | | | | | | | | |
| 04 | Israel | 5 | 18 | 7 | 11 | 11 | | 9 | 2 |
| 05 | Lithuania | 24 | 21 | 8 | 10 | 16 | | 10 | 1 |
| 06 | Spain | 23 | 10 | 22 | 19 | 23 | | 21 | |
| 07 | Ukraine | 12 | 20 | 4 | 20 | 14 | | 5 | 6 |
| 08 | United Kingdom | 8 | 7 | 20 | 3 | 6 | 5 | 19 | |
| 09 | Austria | 7 | 2 | 5 | 14 | 4 | 7 | 11 | |
| 10 | Iceland | 17 | 15 | 24 | 21 | 24 | | 6 | 5 |
| 11 | Latvia | 18 | 9 | 15 | 2 | 8 | 3 | 3 | 8 |
| 12 | Netherlands | 6 | 11 | 6 | 15 | 10 | 1 | 7 | 4 |
| 13 | Finland | 4 | 1 | 13 | 4 | 2 | 10 | 2 | 10 |
| 14 | Italy | 11 | 22 | 3 | 7 | 7 | 4 | 4 | 7 |
| 15 | Poland | 16 | 3 | 11 | 12 | 9 | 2 | 23 | |
| 16 | Germany | 9 | 13 | 16 | 24 | 17 | | 8 | 3 |
| 17 | Greece | 22 | 19 | 19 | 8 | 18 | | 25 | |
| 18 | Armenia | 13 | 4 | 17 | 17 | 12 | | 17 | |
| 19 | Switzerland | 2 | 5 | 1 | 5 | 1 | 12 | 14 | |
| 20 | Malta | 20 | 14 | 12 | 16 | 21 | | 24 | |
| 21 | Portugal | 15 | 24 | 9 | 6 | 15 | | 15 | |
| 22 | Denmark | 19 | 8 | 18 | 25 | 19 | | 22 | |
| 23 | Sweden | 1 | 12 | 14 | 1 | 3 | 8 | 1 | 12 |
| 24 | France | 14 | 6 | 2 | 9 | 5 | 6 | 13 | |
| 25 | San Marino | 21 | 23 | 10 | 13 | 20 | | 16 | |
| 26 | Albania | 25 | 25 | 21 | 18 | 25 | | 20 | |
