= Nublu (rapper) =

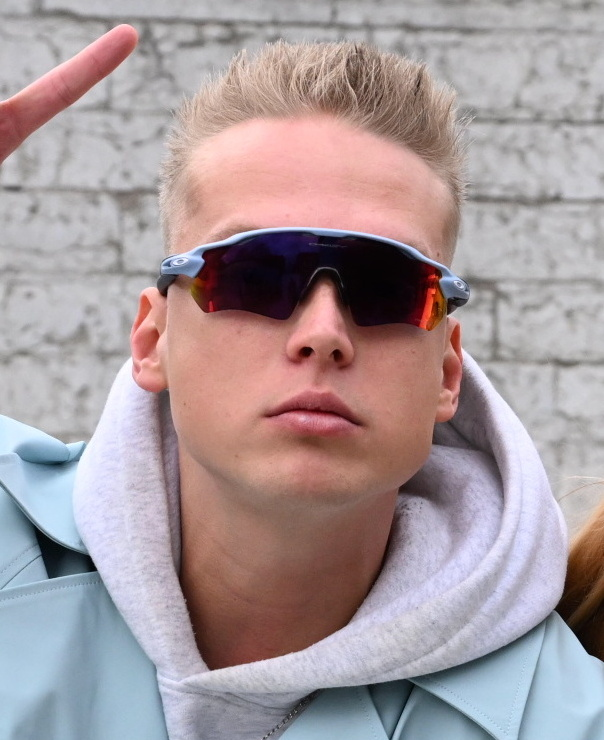
- Nublu in 2024

Background information
- Born: Markkus Pulk; 26 June 1996 (age 30); Keila, Harju County, Estonia
- Genres: Hip-hop, Mumble rap, Pop-rap
- Occupations: Rapper; songwriter
- Years active: 2018–present
- Label: Island Finland
- Website: nublufy.ee
- Relatives: Eva-Lotta Kiibus (sister)

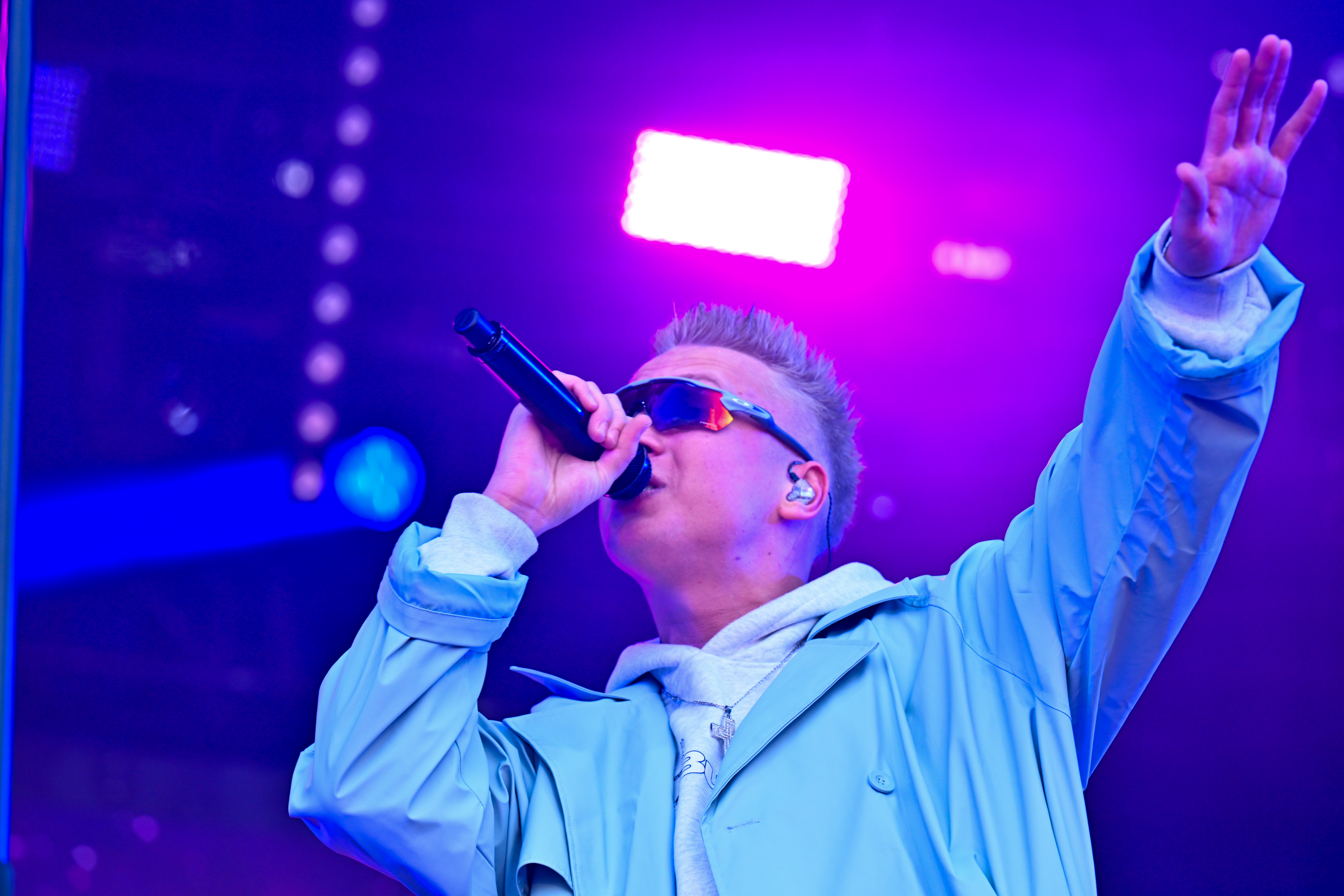
Nublu performing in 2024

Markkus Pulk (born on 26 June 1996 in Keila), professionally known as Nublu (stylized in all lowercase), is an Estonian rapper.

On 10 January 2024, he and Mikael Gabriel were announced as one of the participants of Uuden Musiikin Kilpailu 2024, the Finnish national final for the Eurovision Song Contest 2024, with the song "Vox populi" alongside Mikael Gabriel. They ultimately finished 3rd in the competition with 178 points.

== Early life ==
His younger sister is Eva-Lotta Kiibus, a retired figure skater. In 2021, he stated that he was a member of FCI Levadia Tallinn.

== Discography ==
=== Studio albums ===
List of studio albums, with selected details
Title	Details
Café kosmos	Released: 14 December 2020; Label: Universal Music Estonia; Format: CD, digital download, LP, streaming

=== Live albums ===
List of studio albums, with selected details
Title	Details
Räimerahvas	Released: 30 November 2023; Label: Self-released; Format: digital download, streaming

=== Extended plays ===
List of studio albums, with selected details
Title	Details
Kirjadkoju	Released: 29 November 2024; Label: Island Records Finland; Format: digital download, streaming
Supersuure hoolega (with Vaiko Eplik)	Released: 30 May 2025; Label: Universal Music Estonia, Kaigas; Format: digital download, LP, streaming
Is It Estonia?! (with Tief City 44)	Released: 3 July 2026; Label: Universal Music Estonia; Format: digital download, streaming

=== Singles ===
==== As lead artist: 2018–2021 ====
List of 2018–2021 singles as lead artist, showing year released, chart positions and album name
Title	Year	Peak chart positions					Album or EP
Title	Year	EST	EST Dom.	EST Air. (Note: The TopHit airplay chart for Estonia began publication in January 2023. Radiomonitor data is used for the peak positions from the period before March 2024, as the TopHit chart did not include Estonian-language songs before that date. Radiomonitor confirms on its official website that it bases its data on dozens of Estonian radio stations, a complete list of which can be found in the "About Us" section of their website. If, after March 2024, the TopHit peak differs significantly from the Radiomonitor peak, the Radiomonitor peak is used, since the list of their recognized stations is public.)	FIN	FIN Air.	Album or EP
"Droonid"	2018	—	—	—	—	—	Non-album singles
"Kassipulma aftekas"	2018	—	21	—	—	—	Non-album singles
"Mina ka" (featuring Reket)	2018	1	1	10	—	—	Räimerahvas
"Rulli rulli rulli (Nublu Remix)" (with Öed)	2018	4	4	—	—	—	Non-album single
"Öölaps!"	2018	1	1	3	—	—	Mind on Mitu
"TMT"	2018	1	1	1	—	—	Räimerahvas
"Tsirkus" (with 5miinust and Pluuto)	2019	5	1	—	—	—	Non-album singles
"Muusikakool"	2019	2	1	—	—	—	Non-album singles
"Rotterdam"	2019	1	1	5	—	—	Non-album singles
"Aluspükse" (with 5miinust)	2019	1	1	—	—	—	Non-album singles
"Für Oksana" (featuring Gameboy Tetris)	2019	1	1	2	—	—	Café kosmos
"Croissantid"	2020	1	1	1	—	—	Café kosmos
"1-2"	2020	1	1	1	—	—	Café kosmos
"Laiaks lüüa"	2020	1	1	—	—	—	Café kosmos
"Universum" (with Mikael Gabriel)	2020	*		1	4	53	Café kosmos
"Paraadna" (with Gameboy Tetris and Raul Ojamaa)	2020	*		96	—	—	Café kosmos
"Tamburiin" (with Gameboy Tetris and Buck Fuddi)	2020	*		—	—	—	Café kosmos
"Biology" (with Cartoon and Jéja, featuring Gameboy Tetris)	2021	*		2	—	—	Non-album singles
"Uputada merre" (featuring Whogaux)	2021	*		—	—	—	Non-album singles
"Vihje" (with Mikael Gabriel)	2021	*		5	8	62	Non-album singles
"—" denotes a recording that did not chart or was not released in that territory. "*" denotes that the chart did not exist at that time.

==== As lead artist: since 2022 ====
List of singles released since 2022 as lead artist, showing year released, chart positions and album name
Title	Year	Peak chart positions			Album or EP
Title	Year	EST Air.	FIN	FIN Air.	Album or EP
"Pagasita peruus (Aguascalientes)"	2022	—	—	—	Non-album singles
"Barranco"	2022	—	—	—	Non-album singles
"Võsa"	2022	—	—	—	Non-album singles
"Kastehein"	2022	3	—	—	Räimerahvas
"Kuhu kadus sten?" (with Gameboy Tetris)	2022	—	—	—	Non-album single
"Ära ärata"	2023	3	—	—	Räimerahvas
"Duubel 5"	2023	—	—	—	Räimerahvas
"Kõrvetab" (with 5miinust and Nexus)	2023	—	—	—	Non-album singles
"Heikki?"	2023	78	—	—	Non-album singles
"Trammipark!"	2023	81	—	—	Räimerahvas
"Vox populi" (with Mikael Gabriel)	2024	100	4	21	Non-album singles
"Yao Ming" (with Mikael Gabriel)	2024	—	—	—	Non-album singles
"Push It" (featuring Maria Kallastu)	2024	1	—	72	Non-album singles
"Peagi saabun"	2024	4	—	—	Kirjadkoju
"Lausu tõtt" (with Vaiko Eplik)	2025	1	—	—	Supersuure hoolega
"Lausu tõtt (Noëp Remix)" (with Vaiko Eplik, featuring Noëp)	2025	32	—	—	Non-album single
"Kesselaid" (featuring Tief City 44)	2026	1	—	—	Is It Estonia?!
"Meeldivad tydrukud" (featuring Orelipoiss)	2026	—	—	—	Supersuure hoolega (Note: Appears only on Deluxe edition.)
"Sügistuuled"	2026	—	—	—	Supersuure hoolega
"Lainte laul" (featuring Tief City 44)	2026	11	—	—	Is It Estonia?!
"—" denotes a recording that did not chart or was not released in that territory.

==== As featured artist ====
Title	Year	Peak chart positions		Album or EP
Title	Year	EST	EST Dom.	Album or EP
"Keeruta" (Lenna featuring Nublu)	2018	2	2	3X
"Mesimagus" (Pluuto featuring Nublu)	2019	1	2	Non-album singles
"Vöörad" (Beebilõust featuring Nublu)	2019	7	2	Non-album singles
"SOS" (Pluuto featuring Nublu and Reket)	2019	14	4	Non-album singles
"Tõenäosus (Paraq)" (Boipepperoni featuring Nublu)	2023	*		Kukkunud kuult
"Instituudiauto" (Kirot with Niklavz and Pluuto, featuring Genka and Nublu)	2024	*		Balti instituut
"—" denotes a recording that did not chart or was not released in that territory. "*" denotes that the chart did not exist at that time.

=== Other charted songs ===
==== As lead artist ====
Title	Year	Peak chart positions			Album or EP
Title	Year	EST	EST Dom.	EST Air.	Album or EP
"2 Quick Start"	2018	3	3	—	Mind on mitu
"Siin/Seal"	2024	*		59	Kirjadkoju
"Bach/Brunner" (with Vaiko Eplik)	2025	*		69	Supersuure hoolega
"Tipus ulub tuul" (with Vaiko Eplik)	2025	*		54	Supersuure hoolega
"Arbuusisuvi" (featuring Tief City 44 and Evelin Võigemast)	2026	*		32	Is It Estonia?!
"—" denotes a recording that did not chart or was not released in that territory. "*" denotes that the chart did not exist at that time.

==== As featured artist ====
Title	Year	Peak chart positions			Album or EP
Title	Year	EST	EST Dom.	EST Air.	Album or EP
"SOS (Siimi Remix)" (Pluuto featuring Nublu, Reket and Siimi)	2019	17	5	—	Non-album song
"GRL VMP" (Maria Kallastu featuring Nublu)	2024	*		66	Digipalavik
"—" denotes a recording that did not chart or was not released in that territory. "*" denotes that the chart did not exist at that time.
