= 5miinust =

Estonian musical group

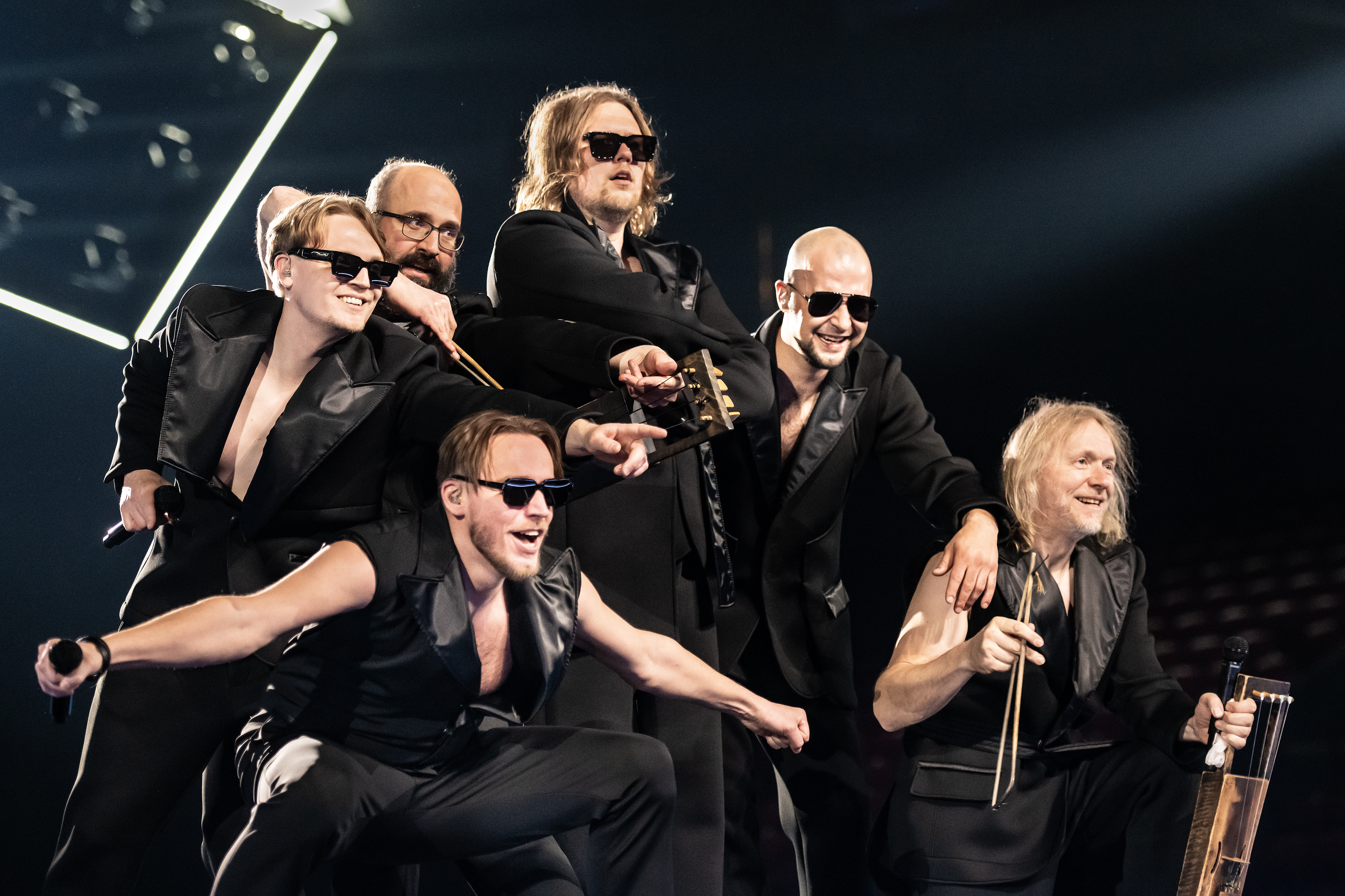
- 5miinust performing alongside Puuluup in 2024

Background information
- Origin: Võsu, Estonia
- Genre: Hip hop
- Years active: 2015–present
- Label: Universal Music Group
- Members: Kristjan Jakobson (Estoni Kohver / Kohver); Mihkel Tamm (Päevakoer); Karl Kivastik (Põhja-Korea / Korea); Priit Tomson (Lancelot)
- Past members: Pavel Botšarov (Venelane)

5miinust (stylized in all caps; Estonian pronunciation: [viːs ˈmiːnust], Estonian for 'five minuses') is an Estonian hip hop group formed in Võsu in 2015. The members of the group are Kristjan Jakobson (pseudonym "Estoni Kohver" (Note: Literally 'Eston's briefcase', but chiefly a reference to Eston Kohver, Estonian security officer detained by Russia in 2014.) or simply "Kohver"), Mihkel Tamm ("Päevakoer"), (Note: Estonian for 'garden tiger moth', literally 'day dog' or 'sun dog'.) Karl Kivastik ("Põhja-Korea" (Note: Estonian for 'North Korea'.) or simply "Korea"), and Priit Tomson ("Lancelot"). They were originally joined by a fifth member, Pavel Botšarov ("Venelane"), (Note: Estonian for 'the Russian'.) who left the group in 2023, starting a solo career under the pseudonym Gameboy Tetris.

5miinust represented Estonia in the Eurovision Song Contest 2024 alongside Puuluup with "(Nendest) narkootikumidest ei tea me (küll) midagi".

== History ==
Founded in Võsu in Lääne-Viru County, 5miinust rose to prominence in 2018, the year in which both studio albums "Aasta plaat" and "Rämmar", released in 2016 and 2017 respectively through Legendaarne Records, charted in the top twenty of the best-selling albums chart nationally, making them two of the 18 most successful albums in 2018. The following year they recorded the single "Aluspükse" with Nublu, which spent six consecutive weeks at the top of the Eesti Tipp-40, becoming the 3rd best-selling song in Estonia for 2019. Also in the same year they were signed to the Baltic branch of Universal Music Group, a label through which they released the following singles, "Paaristõuked", "Peo lõpp" and "Loodus ja hobused", all three number one in the Eesti Tipp-40.

As part of the Estonian Music Awards, the Estonian music industry's main awards, they have won in the Artist of the Year category on two occasions, as well as receiving two additional nominations.

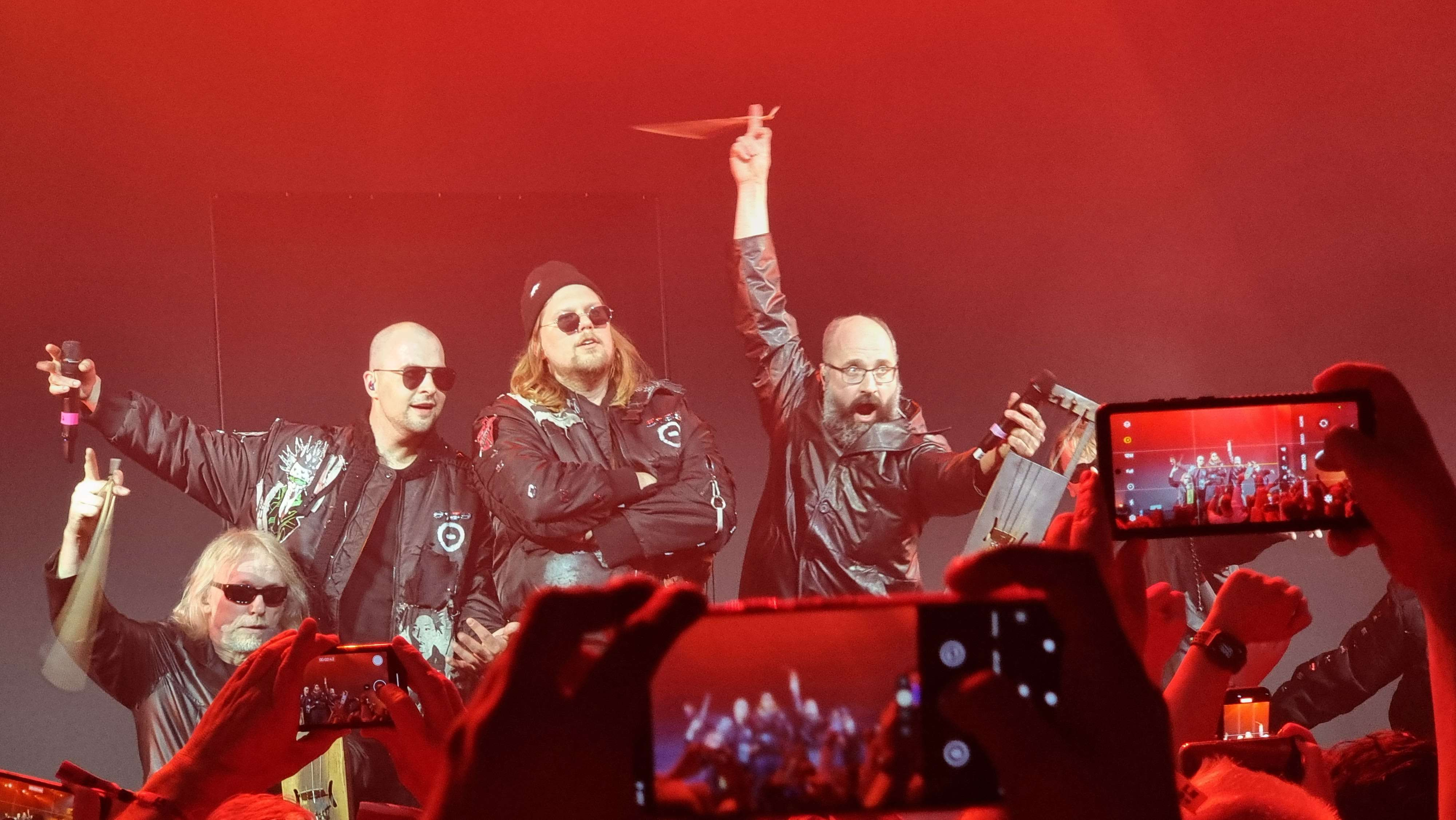
5Miiust and Puuluup in 2024

In November 2023, 5miinust and Puuluup were announced as one of the semi-finalists of Eesti Laul 2024, the Estonian selection for the Eurovision Song Contest 2024, with the song "(Nendest) narkootikumidest ei tea me (küll) midagi". They qualified for the final during the first round of the semi-final. They ultimately won the final and earned the chance to represent Estonia at the contest. At Eurovision they were drawn to compete in the second semi-final, where they placed sixth out of 16 with 79 points, qualifying to the final, where they placed 20th out of 26 with 37 points. On 25 March 2026, former member Pavel Botšarov died by suicide at the age of 40.

== Discography ==
=== Studio albums ===
List of studio albums, with selected details
Title	Details	Peak chart positions
Title	Details	EST
Korralik Saavutus – Aasta Plaat	Released: 10 August 2016; Label: Legendaarne Records; Formats: Digital download, streaming	16
Rämmar	Released: 1 May 2017; Label: Legendaarne Records; Formats: Digital download, streaming	12

=== Collaborative albums ===
List of albums, with selected details
Title	Details
Kannatused ehk külakiigel pole stopperit (with Puuluup)	Released: 26 April 2024; Label: Universal Music Oy; Formats: CD, Vinyl, Digital download, streaming

=== Extended plays ===
List of EPs, with selected details
Title	Details
Niid for Spiid	Released: 23 April 2018; Label: Legendaarne Records; Formats: Digital download, streaming
Kõik on süüdi	Released: 30 November 2021; Label: Universal Music Oy; Formats: Digital download, streaming

=== Singles ===
==== As lead artist ====
Title	Year	Peak chart positions						Album or EP
Title	Year	EST Dom.	EST Air. (Note: The TopHit airplay chart for Estonia began publication in January 2023. Radiomonitor data is used for the peak positions from the period before March 2024, as the TopHit chart did not include Estonian-language songs before that date.)	FIN	LAT Stream.	LTU	SWE Heat.	Album or EP
"Erootikapood"	2017	2	—	—	—	—	—	Non-album singles
"Võlg" (featuring Tigran and 372)	2018	14	—	—	—	—	—	Non-album singles
"Jõul" (featuring Sass Henno)	2018	6	—	—	—	—	—	Non-album singles
"Aitäh" (featuring Sass Henno)	2018	4	—	—	—	—	—	Non-album singles
"Tsirkus" (with Nublu and Pluuto)	2019	1	—	—	—	—	—	Non-album singles
"Lendan" (featuring Orelipoiss)	2019	—	—	—	—	—	—	Non-album singles
"Tasuta"	2019	15	—	—	—	—	—	Non-album singles
"Aluspükse" (with Nublu)	2019	1	—	—	—	—	—	Non-album singles
"Paaristõuked" (with Villemdrillem)	2019	1	2	—	—	—	—	Non-album singles
"Peo lõpp"	2020	1	1	—	—	—	—	Non-album singles
"Loodus ja hobused" (featuring Hendrik Sal-Saller)	2020	1	6	—	—	—	—	Non-album singles
"Gloria"	2021	*	2	—	—	—	—	Non-album singles
"Buffalo"	2021	*	—	—	—	—		Non-album singles
"Koptereid"	2021	*	3	—	—	—	—	Kõik on süüdi
"Vamos"	2022	*	17	—	—	—	—	Non-album singles
"Kõrvetab" (with Nublu and Nexus)	2023	*	—	—	—	—	—	Non-album singles
"Kallab" (with Nublu and Elina Born)	2023	*	—	—	—	—	—	Non-album singles
"(Nendest) narkootikumidest ei tea me (küll) midagi" (with Puuluup)	2023	*	1	49	11	16	7	Kannatused ehk külakiigel pole stopperit
"Isegi kakelda pole kellegagi" (with Puuluup)	2024	*	—	—	—	—	—	Kannatused ehk külakiigel pole stopperit
"Pilates Spiritual Clüb" (with Florian Wahl featuring Jozels)	2025	*	94	—	—	—	—	Non-album singles
"Vanad noormehed"	2025	*	5	—	—	—	—	Non-album singles
"Tooge vana 5minni tagasi"	2025	*	—	—	—	—	—	Non-album singles
"Teine öö x Aga siis" (with Jüri Pootsmann)	2025	*	—	—	—	—	—	Non-album singles
"—" denotes items which were not released in that country or failed to chart. "*" denotes that the chart did not exist at that time.

==== As featured artist ====
Title	Year	Album or EP
"Nii või naa (Neljas öö Remix)" (Jüri Pootsmann featuring 5miinust and Sass Henno)	2016	Non-album single
"Viskit 2018" (Öökülm featuring 5miinust, Genka, Napoleon, and Contra)	2018	Viskit
"Nätakas" (372Kaspar featuring 5miinust)	2024	Hasart

=== Other charted songs ===
Title	Year	Peak chart positions		Album or EP
Title	Year	EST Dom.	EST Air.	Album or EP
"Fuuria" (featuring Genka, Jalgpalluri Tütar, and Kuera)	2016	12	—	Korralik Saavutus - Aasta Plaat
"K2lifaat" (featuring Genka, Cool D, Vana Yoss, and Beebilõust)	2016	15	—	Korralik Saavutus - Aasta Plaat
"Kuum"	2016	13	—	Korralik Saavutus - Aasta Plaat
"Karussell"	2017	4	—	Rämmar
"Naabrid"	2017	6	—	Rämmar
"Deliirium"	2017	20	—	Rämmar
"Skittles"	2017	30	—	Rämmar
"Pohmakas"	2018	22	—	Niid for Spiid
"Anna vett"	2018	20	—	Niid for Spiid
"Trenažöör" (featuring Sass Henno and Jozels)	2018	1	—	Niid for Spiid
"Keti lõpp" (featuring Reket)	2018	8	—	Niid for Spiid
"Mis sa tegid?"	2021	*	9	Kõik on süüdi
"—" denotes items which were not released in that country or failed to chart. "*" denotes that the chart did not exist at that time.

== Awards and nominations ==
Year	Award	Category	Nominee(s)	Result	Ref.
2017	Estonian Music Awards	Best Hip-Hop or Rap Album	Korralik saavutus - Aasta plaat	Nominated	
2020	Estonian Music Awards	Artist of the Year	5miinust	Won	
2021	Estonian Music Awards	Hip-Hop or Rap Artist of the Year	5miinust	Nominated	
2022	Estonian Music Awards	Artist of the Year	5miinust	Won	
2022	Estonian Music Awards	Pop Artist of the Year	5miinust	Nominated	
2022	Estonian Music Awards	Ensemble of the Year	5miinust	Nominated	
2022	Estonian Music Awards	Song of the Year	"Koptereid"	Nominated	
2022	Estonian Music Awards	Music Video of the Year	"Koptereid"	Nominated	
2024	Estonian Music Awards	Music Video of the Year	"Kõrvetab" (with Nublu and Nexus)	Nominated	
2024	Eurovision Awards	Best Onstage Ensemble	5miinust (with Puuluup)	Nominated	
2025	Estonian Music Awards	Band of the Year	5miinust (with Puuluup)	Won	
2025	Estonian Music Awards	Album of the Year	Kannatused ehk külakiigel pole stopperit (with Puuluup)	Won	
2025	Estonian Music Awards	Ethno or Folk Album of the Year	Kannatused ehk külakiigel pole stopperit (with Puuluup)	Won	
2025	Estonian Music Awards	Song of the Year	"(Nendest) narkootikumidest ei tea me (küll) midagi" (with Puuluup)	Nominated	

== Footnotes ==
Awards and achievements
Preceded by Alika with "Bridges"	Estonia in the Eurovision Song Contest; 2024; With: Puuluup	Succeeded by Tommy Cash with "Espresso Macchiato"
