= Puuluup =

Estonian musical group

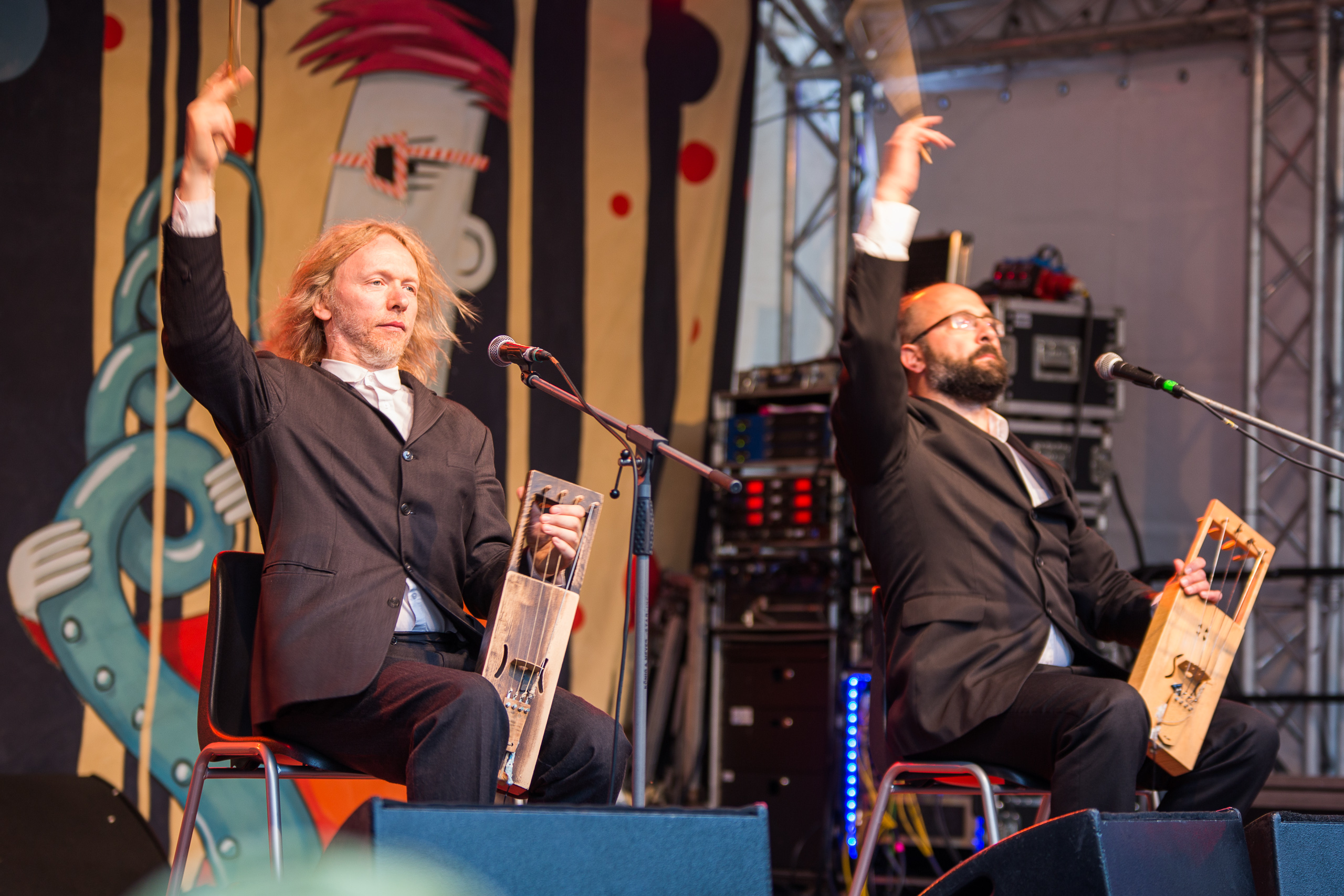
- Ramo Teder (left) and Marko Veisson (right) performing in 2018

Background information
- Origin: Estonia
- Genres: Nu-folk
- Instruments: Talharpa; looper
- Years active: 2014–present
- Label: Õunaviks
- Members: Marko Veisson; Ramo Teder
- Website: www.puuluup.ee

Puuluup (Estonian pronunciation: [ˈpuːluːp]) are an Estonian nu-folk duo that was established in 2014 by Ramo Teder (a.k.a. Pastacas) and Marko Veisson.

In November 2023, they were announced alongside 5miinust as one of the semi-finalists of Eesti Laul 2024, the Estonian selection for the Eurovision Song Contest 2024, with the song "(Nendest) narkootikumidest ei tea me (küll) midagi". They qualified for the final during the first round of the semi-final. They ultimately won the final and represented Estonia at the contest. At Eurovision they were drawn to compete in the second semi-final, where they placed sixth out of 16 with 79 points, qualifying to the final, where they placed 20th out of 26 with 37 points.

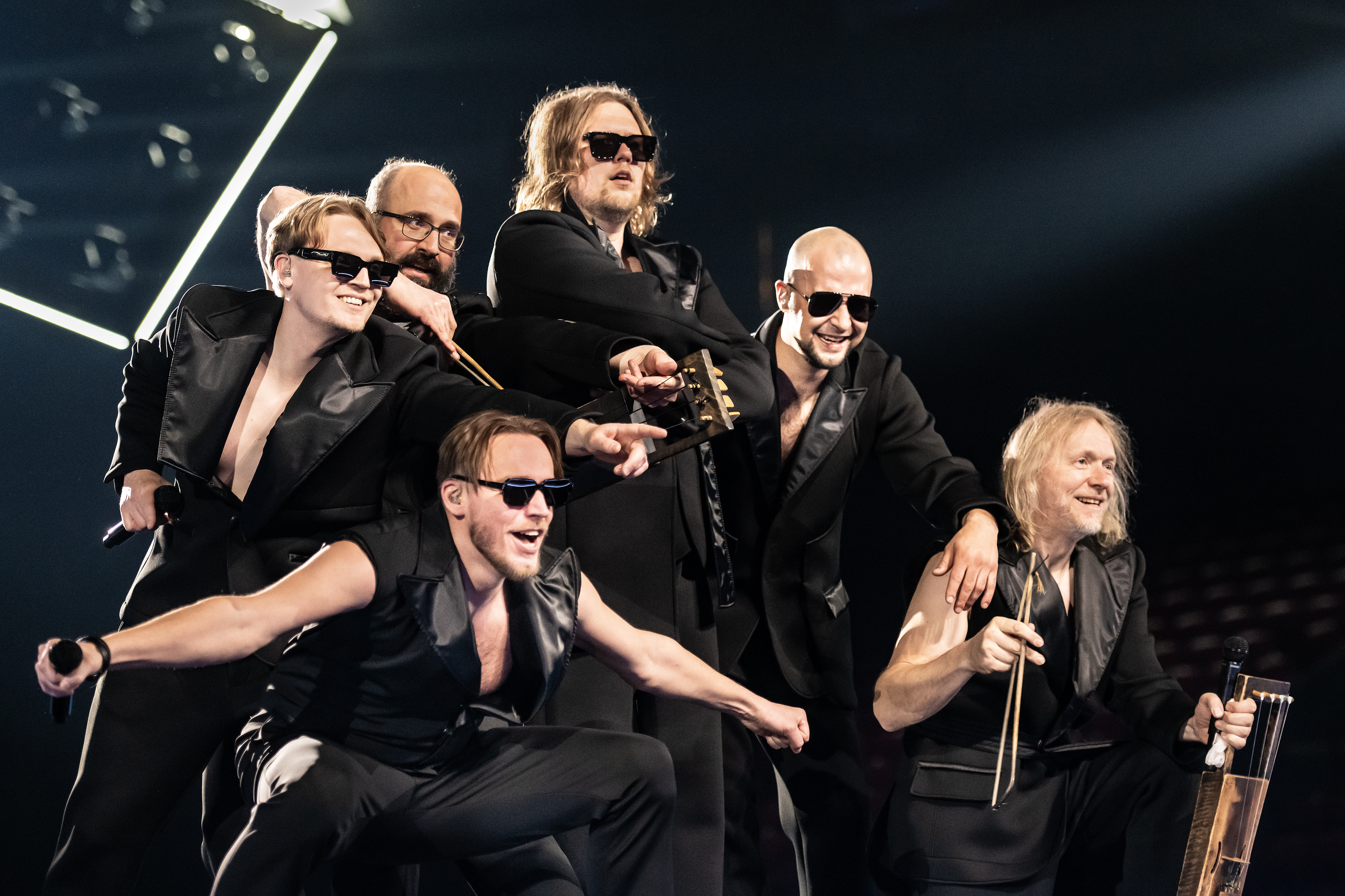
5miinust and Puuluup at the Eurovision Song Contest 2024

== Discography ==
=== Studio albums ===
List of studio albums, with selected details
Title	Details	Peak chart positions
Title	Details	EST
Süüta mu lumi	Released: 1 May 2018; Label: Õunaviks; Formats: Digital download, streaming	31
Viimane suusataja	Released: 17 September 2021; Label: Õunaviks; Formats: Digital download, streaming	*
"*" denotes that the chart did not exist at that time.

=== Collaborative albums ===
List of albums, with selected details
Title	Details
Kannatused ehk külakiigel pole stopperit (with 5miinust)	Released: 26 April 2024; Label: Universal Music Oy; Formats: Digital download, streaming

=== Singles ===
Title	Year	Peak chart positions					Album or EP
Title	Year	EST Air. (Note: The TopHit airplay chart for Estonia began publication in January 2023. Radiomonitor data is used for the peak positions from the period before March 2024, as the TopHit chart did not include Estonian-language songs before that date.)	FIN	LAT Stream.	LTU	SWE Heat.	Album or EP
"Martafana"	2018	—	—	—	—	—	Süüta mu lumi
"Kasekesed"	2019	—	—	—	—	—	Viimane suusataja
"Käpapuu"	2020	—	—	—	—	—	Viimane suusataja
"Mama Can Do"	2020	—	—	—	—	—	Non-album single
"Liigutage vastu"	2021	—	—	—	—	—	Viimane suusataja
"Paala järve vaala baar"	2021	—	—	—	—	—	Viimane suusataja
"(Nendest) narkootikumidest ei tea me (küll) midagi" (with 5miinust)	2023	1	49	11	16	7	Kannatused ehk külakiigel pole stopperit
"Isegi kakelda pole kellegagi" (with 5miinust)	2024	—	—	—	—	—	Kannatused ehk külakiigel pole stopperit
"Üksinda tantsima"	2025	—	—	—	—	—	Non-album single
"—" denotes items which were not released in that country or failed to chart. " * " denotes that the chart did not exist at that time.

=== Other collaborations ===
Title	Year	Album or EP
"Veeruur" (Anne-Mari Kivimäki featuring Puuluup)	2025	Kotiin
"Homme" (Noëp featuring Puuluup)	2025	Folktonic II (Baile Folk)
"Vastlalaul" (Duo Ruut featuring Puuluup)	2025	Ilmateade

== Awards and nominations ==
Year	Award	Category	Nominee(s)	Result	Ref.
2019	Estonian Music Awards	Album of the Year	Süüta mu lumi	Nominated	
2019	Estonian Music Awards	Ethno, Folk, or National Album of the Year	Süüta mu lumi	Won	
2020	Estonian Music Awards	Song of the Year	"Kasekesed"	Nominated	
2022	Estonian Music Awards	Album of the Year	Viimane suusataja	Nominated	
2022	Estonian Music Awards	Ethno or Folk Album of the Year	Viimane suusataja	Won	
2022	Estonian Music Awards	Ensemble of the Year	Viimane suusataja	Won	
2024	Eurovision Awards	Best Onstage Ensemble	Puuluup (with 5miinust)	Nominated	
2025	Estonian Music Awards	Band of the Year	Puuluup (with 5miinust)	Won	
2025	Estonian Music Awards	Album of the Year	Kannatused ehk külakiigel pole stopperit (with 5miinust)	Won	
2025	Estonian Music Awards	Ethno or Folk Album of the Year	Kannatused ehk külakiigel pole stopperit (with 5miinust)	Won	
2025	Estonian Music Awards	Song of the Year	"(Nendest) narkootikumidest ei tea me (küll) midagi" (with 5miinust)	Nominated	

== Footnotes ==
Awards and achievements
Preceded by Alika with "Bridges"	Estonia in the Eurovision Song Contest; 2024; With: 5miinust	Succeeded by Tommy Cash with "Espresso Macchiato"
