= Tuuli Rand =

Estonian singer

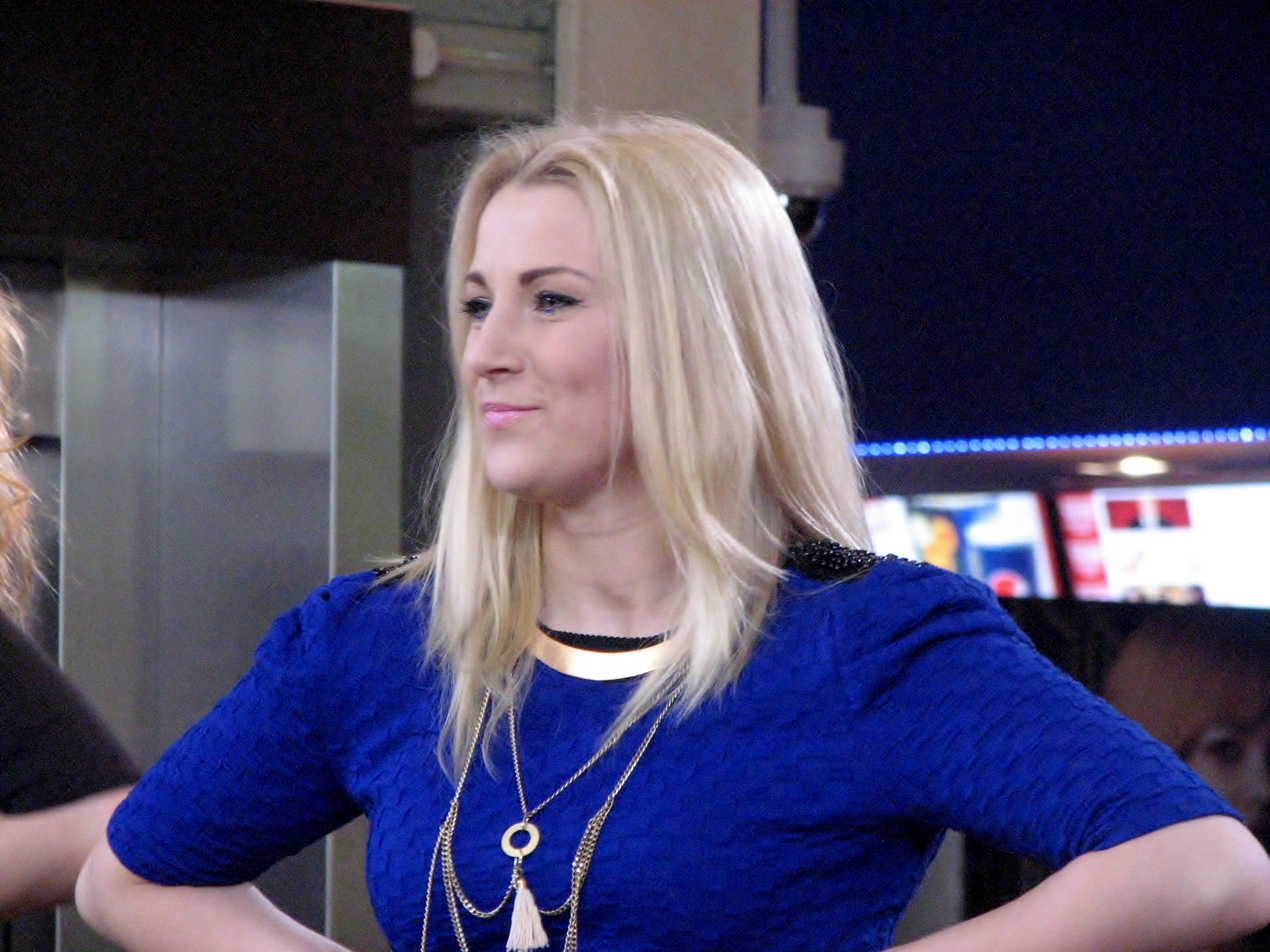
- Tuuli Rand

Background information
- Born: Tuuli Rand; 1 March 1990 (age 36); Kuressaare, then part of Estonian SSR, Soviet Union
- Origin: Estonia

Tuuli Rand (born 1 March 1990) is an Estonian singer.

== Early life and education ==
Rand was born in Kuressaare, Saaremaa. She is a graduate of Kuressaare Gymnasium and Georg Ots Music Singing School.

== Career ==
She is the lead singer in bands TuuliKustiPeep, Funkifize, Bliss, Estonian Dream Dixieland Band, and the vocal ensemble Söörömöö.

During the Estonian singing show Eesti otsib superstaari she came to the studio rounds, but stopped there on her way and she did not make the finals.

As semi-finalist of Eesti Laul 2013 competition, she was co-managing two projects. With Liisi Koikson and band Söörömöö (of it she is a member), she sang the song "Üle vee" (Over the Water) and as a solo artist sang the song "Ring the Alarm", with Teele Viira. The songs finished 5th and 10th respectively in the final.

She returned the following year with VÖÖRAD singing the song "Maailm on hull" but was eliminated in the semi-final.

Tuuli Rand released the first solo single, "Do not Be Afraid", which she wrote alongside drummer Peep Kallas.

Rand participated in Eesti Laul 2021 to represent Estonia in the Eurovision Song Contest 2021 with her song "Üks öö", but did not qualify for the final.

Rand is competed in Eesti Laul 2025 to represent Estonia in the Eurovision Song Contest 2025 with the song "REM" but came in last place with only two points.
