= Estonia in the Eurovision Song Contest 2024 =

- Eurovision Song Contest 2024
- Participating broadcaster: Eesti Rahvusringhääling (ERR)
- Country: Estonia
- Selection process: Eesti Laul 2024
- Selection date: 17 February 2024

Competing entry
- Song: "(Nendest) narkootikumidest ei tea me (küll) midagi"
- Artist: 5miinust and Puuluup
- Songwriters: Karl "Põhja Korea" Kivastik; Kim Wennerström; Kristjan "Kohver" Jakobson; Marko Veisson; Mihkel "Päevakoer" Tamm; Priit "Lancelot" Tomson; Ramo Teder

Placement
- Semi-final result: Qualified (6th, 79 points)
- Final result: 20th, 37 points

Participation chronology

Estonia was represented at the Eurovision Song Contest 2024 with the song "(Nendest) narkootikumidest ei tea me (küll) midagi" performed by 5miinust and Puuluup. The Estonian participating broadcaster, Eesti Rahvusringhääling (ERR), organised the national final Eesti Laul 2024 in order to select its entry for the contest. The national final consisted of two shows: a semi-final and a final. Fifteen songs competed in the semi-final and five were automatically qualified for the final. A total of five songs qualified from the semi-final: three were determined by a jury panel and public vote and two were selected solely by the public vote. In the final, the winner was selected over two rounds of voting. In the first round, a jury panel and a public vote selected the top three to qualify to the superfinal. In the superfinal, "(Nendest) narkootikumidest ei tea me (küll) midagi" performed by 5miinust and Puuluup was selected as the winner entirely by a public vote.

Estonia was drawn to compete in the second semi-final of the Eurovision Song Contest which took place on 9 May 2024. Performing during the show in position 13, "(Nendest) narkootikumidest ei tea me (küll) midagi" was announced among the top 10 entries of the second semi-final and therefore qualified to compete in the final on 11 May. It was later revealed that Estonia placed sixth out of the 16 participating countries in the semi-final with 79 points. In the final, Estonia performed in position 9 and placed twentieth out of the 25 participating countries, scoring 37 points.

== Background ==
Prior to the 2024 contest, Eesti Televisioon (ETV) until 2007, and Eesti Rahvusringhääling (ERR) since 2008, had participated in the Eurovision Song Contest representing Estonia twenty-eight times since ETV's first entry in 1994, winning the contest in 2001 with the song "Everybody" performed by Tanel Padar, Dave Benton and 2XL. Following the introduction of semi-finals in 2004, they had, to this point, managed to qualify to the final on nine occasions, including in 2023, when "Bridges" performed by Alika placed eighth in the final.

As part of its duties as participating broadcaster, ERR organises the selection of its entry in the Eurovision Song Contest and broadcasts the event in the country. Since its debut, the Estonian broadcaster had organised national finals that featured a competition among multiple artists and songs in order to select its entry for the contest. The Eesti Laul competition had been organised since 2009, and on 5 July 2023, ERR announced that it would organise the 2024 edition of the competition, thus confirming its participation in the 2024 contest.

== Before Eurovision ==
=== Eesti Laul 2024 ===
Eesti Laul 2024 was the sixteenth edition of the Estonian national selection Eesti Laul, which selected the Estonian entry for the Eurovision Song Contest 2024. The competition was held between 20 January and 17 February 2024 and was hosted by Tõnis Niinemets and Grete Kuld. Like in previous editions, Aleksandr Hobotov and Julia Kalenda provided Russian-language commentary in the live shows of Eesti Laul on ETV+.

==== Format ====
In July 2023, ERR announced their intention to apply changes to the production team of the selection, with Tomi Rahula stepping down from his position as chief producer after five editions, as well as to the format of the competition. Karmel Killandi was later revealed as his successor.

On 15 September 2023, ERR specified the details of the new format. This included only one semi-final on 20 January 2024 and a final on 17 February 2024. 15 songs competed in the semi-final and the top five qualified for the final, joining five automatic qualifiers for a ten-song final. The results of the semi-final were determined by the combination of votes from a 35 (or more)-member jury and public televoting for the first qualifiers, and a second round of public televoting for the remaining qualifiers. The winning song in the final was also selected over two rounds of voting: the top songs selected via the combination of a 9-member international expert jury and public voting went through a second round of televoting to determine the winner.

==== Competing entries ====
A submission window for interested artists was open from 15 September until 23 October 2023, with each applicant able to submit a maximum of five entries. At least 50% of the artists and/or songwriters for a submission were required to be nationals or residents of Estonia, with a lower fee imposed on Estonian-language songs compared to songs in other languages; both of the fees were doubled for entries submitted in the last two days before the deadline. At the closing of the application period, 215 entries had been received – 88 in Estonian, 126 in English and one in Italian.

The 15 semi-finalist entries and 5 finalist entries (plus two backups) were selected by a 41-member jury composed both of professionals and non-specialist music listeners, who were not informed about the identity of the applicants until after the selection took place. Selected artists and entries were announced during the daily broadcasts of the ETV entertainment program Ringvaade on 6 and 7 November 2023. Despite being set to be released on 8 December 2023, some were leaked the previous day.

Among the selected competing artists was Laura, who represented Estonia in 2005 as part of the group Suntribe and in 2017 alongside Koit Toome.

Selection jury members
- Airi Liiva
- Alice Aleksandrini
- Andres Aljaste
- Andres Oja
- Andres Panksepp
- Anett Kulbin
- Anna-Aurelia Kangur
- Bert Brikenfeldt
- Danel Pandre
- Elina Nechayeva
- Evert Poom
- Gerd Eston Sepp
- Hanna-Liina Võsa
- Heini Vaikmaa
- Ivi Rausi
- Juhan Paadam
- Jüri Nael
- Koit Raudsepp
- Lauri Liiv
- Magnus Müürsepp
- Maian Kärmas
- Margot Suur
- Maria Listra
- Martin Korjus
- Martin Trudnikov
- Ott Lepland
- Owe Petersell
- Pille Minev
- Priit Pajusaar
- Raivo Oja
- Rauno Märks
- Rein Fuks
- Riivo Kallasmaa
- Robert Kõrvits
- Sten Heinoja
- Sten Teppan
- Tarmo Krimm
- Ülar-Johannes Palm
- Vaiko Eplik
- Veronika Portsmuth
- Yasmyn

Competing entries
Artist	Song	Songwriter(s)
5miinust and Puuluup	"(Nendest) narkootikumidest ei tea me (küll) midagi"	Karl "Põhja Korea" Kivastik; Kim Wennerström; Kristjan "Kohver" Jakobson; Marko Veisson; Mihkel "Päevakoer" Tamm; Priit "Lancelot" Tomson; Ramo Teder
Anet Vaikmaa	"Serotoniin"	Sven Lõhmus
Antsud	"Vetevaim"	Aile Alveus; Antsud
Brother Apollo	"Bad Boy"	Erkki Sippel; Joseph Miettinen
Carlos Ukareda	"Never Growing Up"	Carlos Ukareda
Cartoon and Ewert Sundja	"Oblivion"	Ewert Sundja; Hugo Martin Maasikas; Joosep Järvesaar
Cecilia	"FOMO"	Cecilia-Martina Mägi; Liis Hainla; Sander Sadam
Daniel Levi	"Over the Moon"	Daniel Levi Viinalass; Vallo Kikas; Victor Crone
Ewert and The Two Dragons	"Hold Me Now"	Erki Pärnoja; Ewert Sundja; Ivo Etti; Kristjan Kallas
Inga	"No Dog on a Leash"	Inga Tislar; Markus Palo
Ingmar	"Dreaming"	Ingmar Erik Kiviloo
Laura	"Here's Where I Draw the Line"	Johannes Lõhmus; Laura Põldvere
Nele-Liis Vaiksoo	"Käte ümber jää"	Allan Kasuk; Marek Sadam; Nele-Liis Vaiksoo; Peter Põder
Ollie	"My Friend"	Oliver Mazurtšak
Peter Põder	"Korra veel"	Peter Põder
Silver Jusilo	"Lately"	Silver Jusilo; Markus Palo
Sofia Rubina	"Be Good"	Jason Hunter; Renae Rain; Robert Stanley Montes
Traffic	"Wunderbar"	Stig Rästa; Silver Laas
Uudo Sepp and Sarah Murray	"Still Love"	Aleksi Wiklund; Joel Sundkvist; Liis Hainla; Uudo Sepp
Yonna	"I Don't Know About You"	Johanna Eendra; Jakob Kaarma; Semjon Greef

==== Shows ====
===== Semi-final =====
The semi-final took place on 20 January 2024 at the University of Tartu Sports Hall in Tartu. The city, elected European Capital of Culture for 2024, featured in promotional segments aired during the show. The show also featured guest performances by dance crew Põmaki! (directed by Ingmar Jõela) and former Eesti Laul participant Anett Kulbin with Angus, who sung "Tattoo".

First round (jury and televote) qualifier Second round (televote-only) qualifier

Semi-final (first round) – 20 January 2024
R/O	Artist	Song	Jury		Televote		Total	Place
R/O	Artist	Song	Votes	Points	Votes	Points	Total	Place
1	5miinust and Puuluup	"(Nendest) narkootikumidest ei tea me (küll) midagi"	218	4	6,794	12	16	2
2	Inga	"No Dog on a Leash"	269	8	640	2	10	7
3	Ollie	"My Friend"	242	7	3,242	10	17	1
4	Yonna	"I Don't Know About You"	151	0	343	0	0	13
5	Peter Põder	"Korra veel"	117	0	323	0	0	14
6	Cartoon and Ewert Sundja	"Oblivion"	286	10	640	1	11	6
7	Traffic	"Wunderbar"	242	6	983	6	12	4
8	Ingmar	"Dreaming"	195	3	1,868	8	11	5
9	Anet Vaikmaa	"Serotoniin"	170	0	892	5	5	9
10	Laura	"Here's Where I Draw the Line"	174	1	1,321	7	8	8
11	Sofia Rubina	"Be Good"	236	5	188	0	5	11
12	Antsud	"Vetevaim"	121	0	394	0	0	12
13	Silver Jusilo	"Lately"	99	0	305	0	0	15
14	Cecilia	"FOMO"	185	2	720	3	5	10
15	Ewert and The Two Dragons	"Hold Me Now"	295	12	802	4	16	3

Semi-final (second round) – 20 January 2024
Artist	Song	Televote	Place
Anet Vaikmaa	"Serotoniin"	1,864	1
Antsud	"Vetevaim"	199	10
Cartoon and Ewert Sundja	"Oblivion"	850	5
Cecilia	"FOMO"	515	6
Inga	"No Dog on a Leash"	435	7
Ingmar	"Dreaming"	1,078	4
Laura	"Here's Where I Draw the Line"	349	8
Peter Põder	"Korra veel"	1,413	2
Silver Jusilo	"Lately"	109	11
Sofia Rubina	"Be Good"	102	12
Traffic	"Wunderbar"	1,278	3
Yonna	"I Don't Know About You"	213	9

===== Final =====
The final took place on 17 February 2024 at the Tondiraba Ice Hall in Tallinn. The members of the international jury were William Lee Adams (founder of Wiwibloggs), Ole Tøpholm (DR Eurovision commentator), Anna Sahlene (Swedish singer who represented Estonia in 2002), Julian Gutierrez, Andrew Rogers, Annely Peebo (2002 Eurovision co-host), Henkka Remes, Liam Clark (former Eurovision head of press for Estonia) and Þórunn Lárusdóttir. The show featured guest performances by Alika (2023 Estonian Eurovision representative) featuring Bedwetters, HND, Gameboy Tetris, Eleryn Tiit, Muteko Taiko, Dance Republic Tantsukool and Arop.

Final – 17 February 2024
R/O	Artist	Song	Jury		Televote		Total	Place
R/O	Artist	Song	Votes	Points	Votes	Points	Total	Place
1	Brother Apollo	"Bad Boy"	43	3	413	1	4	10
2	Carlos Ukareda	"Never Growing Up"	54	6	634	2	8	6
3	Ewert and The Two Dragons	"Hold Me Now"	43	4	806	3	7	7
4	Anet Vaikmaa	"Serotoniin"	63	7	2,945	6	13	5
5	Ollie	"My Friend"	74	12	7,384	10	22	1
6	Daniel Levi	"Over the Moon"	43	5	4,040	8	13	4
7	Uudo Sepp and Sarah Murray	"Still Love"	33	1	1,179	5	6	8
8	Peter Põder	"Korra veel"	33	2	1,092	4	6	9
9	5miinust and Puuluup	"(Nendest) narkootikumidest ei tea me (küll) midagi"	67	8	16,740	12	20	2
10	Nele-Liis Vaiksoo	"Käte ümber jää"	69	10	3,152	7	17	3

Detailed jury votes
R/O	Song	L. Clark	W. L. Adams	A. Peebo	H. Remes	J. Gutierrez	O. Tøpholm	T. Lárusdóttir	A. Rogers	A. Sahlene	Total
1	"Bad Boy"	5	7	4	8	1	3	1	8	6	43
2	"Never Growing Up"	12	6	6	4	3	6	4	5	8	54
3	"Hold Me Now"	3	3	2	3	8	2	5	10	7	43
4	"Serotoniin"	8	8	7	5	6	10	10	7	2	63
5	"My Friend"	7	10	8	10	10	12	3	4	10	74
6	"Over the Moon"	2	5	12	6	7	4	2	1	4	43
7	"Still Love"	6	1	3	1	4	7	6	2	3	33
8	"Korra veel"	1	2	1	7	2	5	7	3	5	33
9	"(Nendest) narkootikumidest ei tea me (küll) midagi"	10	12	5	12	12	1	8	6	1	67
10	"Käte ümber jää"	4	4	10	2	5	8	12	12	12	69

Superfinal – 17 February 2024
Artist	Song	Televote	Place
5miinust and Puuluup	"(Nendest) narkootikumidest ei tea me (küll) midagi"	26,422	1
Nele-Liis Vaiksoo	"Käte ümber jää"	5,014	3
Ollie	"My Friend"	12,494	2

==== Ratings ====
Viewing figures by show
Show	Air date	Average viewership	Share (%)	Average rating (%)	Total viewership	Total rating (%)
Semi-final	20 January 2024	155,000	36.7%	13.6%	255,000	22.4%
Final	17 February 2024	191,000	41.5%	16.6%	297,000	25.9%

=== Preparation and promotion ===
In accordance with Eurovision regulations, which prohibit any reference to trademarks, mention of Lay's chips was removed from a verse of "(Nendest) narkootikumidest ei tea me (küll) midagi" ahead of the contest. As part of their participation in the contest, 5miinust and Puuluup attended the Barcelona Eurovision Party on 6 April 2024, the London Eurovision Party on 7 April 2024 and the Nordic Eurovision Party in Stockholm on 14 April 2024.

== At Eurovision ==
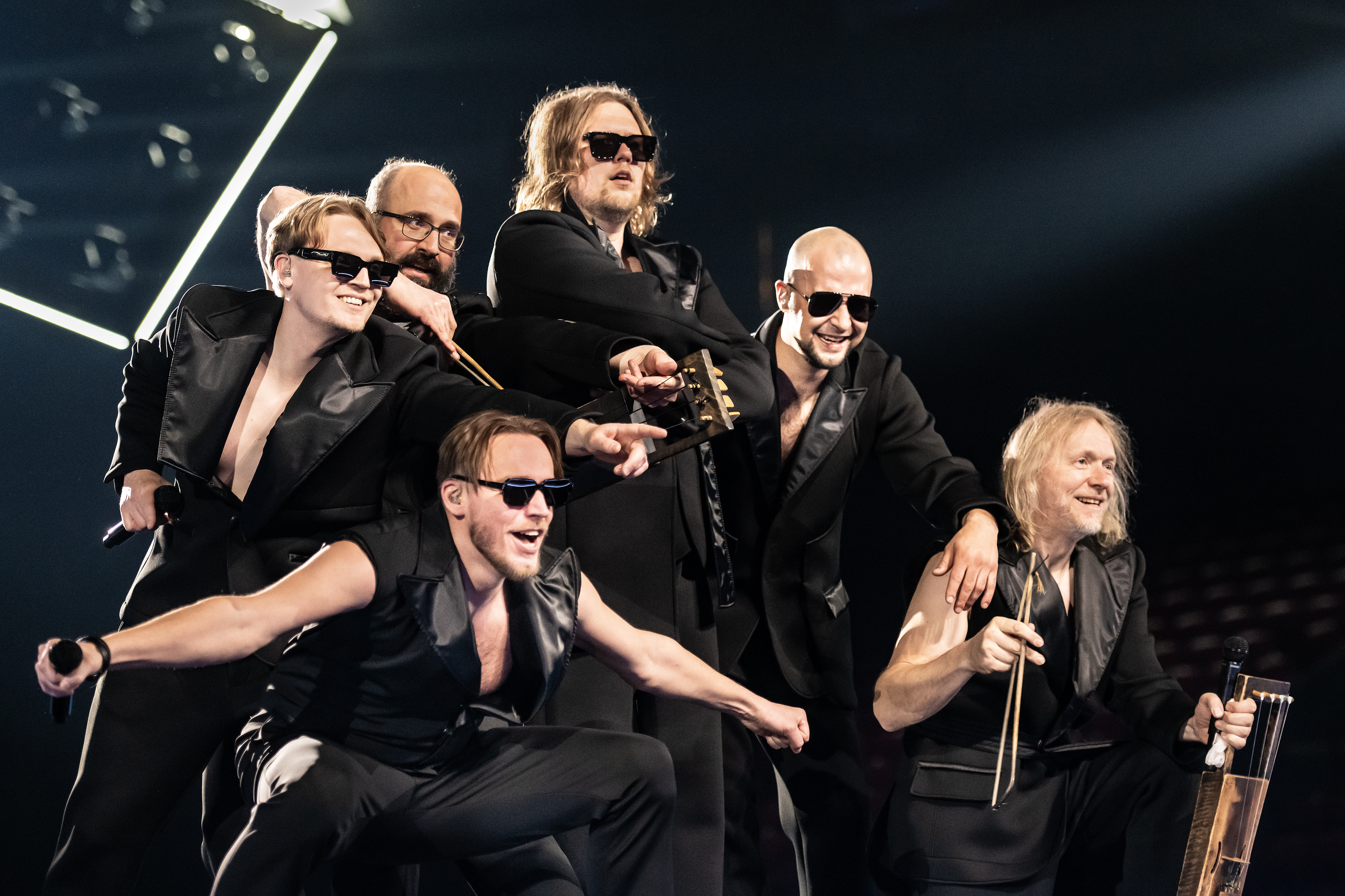
5miinust and Puuluup during a rehearsal before the final.

According to Eurovision rules, all nations with the exceptions of the host country and the "Big Five" (France, Germany, Italy, Spain and the United Kingdom) are required to qualify from one of two semi-finals in order to compete for the final; the top ten countries from each semi-final progress to the final. The European Broadcasting Union (EBU) split up the competing countries into six different pots based on voting patterns from previous contests, with countries with favourable voting histories put into the same pot. On 30 January 2024, an allocation draw was held which placed each country into one of the two semi-finals, as well as which half of the show they would perform in. Estonia was placed into the second semi-final, to be held on 9 May 2024, and was scheduled to perform in the second half of the show.

Once all the competing songs for the 2024 contest had been released, the running order for the semi-finals was decided by the shows' producers rather than through another draw, so that similar songs were not placed next to each other. Estonia was set to perform in position 13, following the entry from Belgium and before the entry from Israel.

In Estonia, all shows were aired on ETV with Estonian-language commentary by Marko Reikop, on ETV+ with Russian-language commentary by Aleksandr Hobotov and Julia Kalenda, as well as on ETV2 with Estonian Sign Language interpreters.

In addition, ahead of the contest, ERR again organised and broadcast the Eurovision preview show Eurovisiooni laulud between 31 March and 5 May 2024; hosted by Eesti laul presenters Grete Kuld and Tõnis Niinemets, each episode featured a panel composed of television personalities and members from the public who discussed and evaluated the competing entries, ultimately decreeing a number of favourites – namely Austria, Cyprus, Ireland, Italy, Norway and Ukraine. As part of the Eurovision programming, ERR also cooperated with DR and SVT alongside other EBU member broadcasters – namely ARD/WDR, the BBC, ČT, ERR, France Télévisions, NRK, NTR, RÚV, VRT and Yle – to produce and air a documentary titled ABBA – Against the Odds, on the occasion of the 50th anniversary of Sweden's first victory at the contest with "Waterloo" by ABBA.

In late March 2024, the Estonian postcard, to be shown before the country's performance in each show, was filmed. Filming took place in the same industrial area in Estonia where the music video for "(Nendest) narkootikumidest ei tea me (küll) midagi" was set.

=== Semi-final ===
5miinust and Puuluup took part in technical rehearsals on 30 April and 3 May, followed by dress rehearsals on 8 and 9 May. For their performance of "(Nendest) narkootikumidest ei tea me (küll) midagi" at the contest, they were all dressed in black.

At the end of the show, Estonia was announced as having finished in the top 10 and subsequently qualifying for the grand final. It was later revealed that Estonia placed sixth in the semi-final, receiving a total of 79 points.

=== Final ===
Following the semi-final, Estonia drew "producer's choice" for the final, meaning that the country performed in the half decided by the contest's producers. It was later revealed that Estonia would perform in position 9, following the entry from Spain and before the entry from Ireland.

Estonia once again took part in dress rehearsals on 10 and 11 May before the final, including the jury final where the professional juries cast their final votes before the live show. 5miinust and Puuluup performed a repeat of their semi-final performance during the final on 11 May. Estonia placed twentieth in the final, scoring 37 points: 33 points from the televoting and 4 points from the juries.

=== Voting ===
Below is a breakdown of points awarded to Estonia in the second semi-final and in the final. Voting during the three shows involved each country awarding sets of points from 1-8, 10 and 12: one from their professional jury and the other from televoting in the final vote, while the semi-final vote was based entirely on the vote of the public. The Estonian jury consisted of Alice Aleksandridi, Olavi Pihlamägi, Rolf Roosalu, Sten Teppan, and Kaire Vilgats. In the second semi-final, Estonia placed sixth with 79 points, receiving maximum twelve points from Latvia. In the final, Estonia placed 20th with 37 points, receiving twelve points from Latvia in the televote. Over the course of the contest, Estonia awarded its 12 points to Latvia in the second semi-final, and to Switzerland (jury) and Ukraine (televote) in the final.

ERR appointed Birgit Sarrap, who represented Estonia in the 2013 contest, as its spokesperson to announce the Estonian jury's votes in the final.

==== Points awarded to Estonia ====
Points awarded to Estonia (Semi-final 2)
Score	Televote
12 points	Latvia
10 points	Israel
8 points	
7 points	Austria; Rest of the World; Netherlands
6 points	Czechia
5 points	Switzerland
4 points	Belgium; Denmark; Norway
3 points	Albania; Italy
2 points	Armenia; France; Greece
1 point	San Marino (Note: San Marino uses a jury in the semi-finals.)

Points awarded to Estonia (Final)
Score	Televote	Jury
12 points	Latvia	
10 points		
8 points		
7 points	Finland	
6 points	Lithuania	
5 points		
4 points	Croatia; Ukraine	
3 points		
2 points		Austria; Italy
1 point		

==== Points awarded by Estonia ====
Points awarded by Estonia (Semi-final 2)
Score	Televote
12 points	Latvia
10 points	Netherlands
8 points	Israel
7 points	Switzerland
6 points	Norway
5 points	Denmark
4 points	Armenia
3 points	Austria
2 points	Czechia
1 point	Georgia

Points awarded by Estonia (Final)
Score	Televote	Jury
12 points	Ukraine	Switzerland
10 points	Croatia	Ukraine
8 points	Finland	Croatia
7 points	Switzerland	France
6 points	Israel	Sweden
5 points	France	Israel
4 points	Lithuania	Germany
3 points	Latvia	Italy
2 points	Ireland	Lithuania
1 point	Sweden	Latvia

==== Detailed voting results ====
Each participating broadcaster assembles a five-member jury panel consisting of music industry professionals who are citizens of the country they represent. Each jury, and individual jury member, is required to meet a strict set of criteria regarding professional background, as well as diversity in gender and age. No member of a national jury was permitted to be related in any way to any of the competing acts in such a way that they cannot vote impartially and independently. The individual rankings of each jury member as well as the nation's televoting results were released shortly after the grand final.

The following members comprised the Estonian jury:

- Alice Aleksandridi
- Olavi Pihlamägi
- Rolf Roosalu
- Sten Teppan
- Kaire Vilgats

Detailed voting results from Estonia (Semi-final 2)
R/O	Country	Televote	
R/O	Country	Rank	Points
01	Malta	14	
02	Albania	15	
03	Greece	12	
04	Switzerland	4	7
05	Czechia	9	2
06	Austria	8	3
07	Denmark	6	5
08	Armenia	7	4
09	Latvia	1	12
10	San Marino	13	
11	Georgia	10	1
12	Belgium	11	
13	Estonia		
14	Israel	3	8
15	Norway	5	6
16	Netherlands	2	10

Detailed voting results from Estonia (Final)
R/O	Country	Jury							Televote	
R/O	Country	Juror A	Juror B	Juror C	Juror D	Juror E	Rank	Points	Rank	Points
01	Sweden	5	3	9	17	2	5	6	10	1
02	Ukraine	2	2	3	4	13	2	10	1	12
03	Germany	15	9	6	5	12	7	4	16	
04	Luxembourg	14	21	16	18	20	23		20	
~~05~~	~~Netherlands~~ ‡ (Note: The Netherlands was disqualified prior to the final.)	~~25~~	~~22~~	~~24~~	~~25~~	~~16~~	~~25~~		N/A	
06	Israel	13	5	2	6	19	6	5	5	6
07	Lithuania	6	8	12	22	6	9	2	7	4
08	Spain	22	14	20	14	7	17		14	
09	Estonia									
10	Ireland	21	25	5	16	21	16		9	2
11	Latvia	20	11	18	3	10	10	1	8	3
12	Greece	9	24	23	12	11	18		19	
13	United Kingdom	24	4	11	10	22	11		18	
14	Norway	7	15	21	15	8	13		11	
15	Italy	4	10	8	20	9	8	3	15	
16	Serbia	16	7	7	19	24	14		23	
17	Finland	23	12	13	7	17	15		3	8
18	Portugal	17	20	17	8	25	21		22	
19	Armenia	11	23	14	23	4	12		12	
20	Cyprus	18	19	10	24	18	22		17	
21	Switzerland	1	1	1	2	3	1	12	4	7
22	Slovenia	19	18	19	13	23	24		24	
23	Croatia	10	6	4	9	1	3	8	2	10
24	Georgia	12	17	22	11	15	20		21	
25	France	3	13	15	1	5	4	7	6	5
26	Austria	8	16	25	21	14	19		13	
