= (Nendest) narkootikumidest ei tea me (küll) midagi =

2024 song by 5miinust and Puuluup

Single by 5miinust and Puuluup

from the album Kannatused ehk külakiigel pole stopperit
- English title: We (really) know nothing about (these) drugs
- Released: 8 December 2023
- Genre: Electro-hop, folktronica, nu-folk
- Length: 2:47
- Label: Universal
- Songwriters: Kim Wennerström; Kohver; Lancelot; Marko Veisson; Päevakoer; Põhja Korea; Ramo Teder
- Producer: Kim Wennerström

5miinust singles chronology
"Kallab" (2023)	"(Nendest) narkootikumidest ei tea me (küll) midagi" (2023)	"Isegi kakelda pole kellegagi" (2024)

Puuluup singles chronology
"Paala järve vaala baar" (2021)	"(Nendest) narkootikumidest ei tea me (küll) midagi" (2023)	"Isegi kakelda pole kellegagi" (2024)

Music video
- "(Nendest) narkootikumidest ei tea me (küll) midagi" on YouTube

Eurovision Song Contest 2024 entry
- Country: Estonia
- Artists: 5miinust and Puuluup
- Language: Estonian
- Composers: Kim Wennerström; Marko Veisson; Ramo Teder
- Lyricists: Kristjan "Kohver" Jakobson; Priit "Lancelot" Tomson; Mihkel "Päevakoer" Tamm; Karl "Põhja Korea" Kivastik

Finals performance
- Semi-final result: 6th
- Semi-final points: 79
- Final result: 20th
- Final points: 37

Entry chronology
- ◄ "Bridges" (2023)
- "Espresso macchiato" (2025) ►

Official performance video
- "(Nendest) narkootikumidest ei tea me (küll) midagi" (Second Semi-Final) on YouTube "(Nendest) narkootikumidest ei tea me (küll) midagi" (Grand Final) on YouTube

"(Nendest) narkootikumidest ei tea me (küll) midagi" (Estonian: [ˈnendest nɑrˈkoːtikumidest ei̯ ˈteɑ̯ me ˈkylː ˈmidɑgi]; transl. We (really) know nothing about (these) drugs (Note: Word-for-word translation: "(about) (These) drugs do-not know we (sure) anything")) is a collaborative song by Estonian hip hop group 5miinust and Estonian folk duo Puuluup, released on 8 December 2023 by Universal Music Oy. It was written by members of both groups. The song represented Estonia in the Eurovision Song Contest 2024, where it placed 20th with 37 points.

The song has been described as one that satirises police targeting society's lower class in drug raids. Critical response to "(Nendest) narkootikumidest ei tea me (küll) midagi" has drawn highly polarised, mostly negative reviews by Eurovision beat reporters. Various outlets deemed the song to be messy and confusing, some ranking it among the bottom-worst entries of the competition. Others praised the song and its humour, and even some sceptical reviews pointed to the enthusiastic audience participation.

The song entered the top 20 in all official charts across Baltic states.

== Background and composition ==
"(Nendest) narkootikumidest ei tea me (küll) midagi" was composed by the members of Puuluup: Marko Veisson and Ramo Teder, and was written by the members of 5miinust: Estoni Kohver, Päevakoer, Põhja-Korea, and Lancelot, along with Kim Wennerström. According to Veisson and Korea, the song was inspired by a journey that the two took. While on the journey, Veisson reportedly told Korea that he did not "know anything about [Korea's] drugs". It also drew inspiration from a 1980 song that referenced poppies and ducks, which is used as a political metaphor; the poppy in used within the song to reference the upper class along with heroin, and ducks were used to refer to the lower class.

In an analysis by poet Joonas Veelmaa, Veelmaa claims that the song is trying to "disprove some kind of myth", reinforcing that the person listening to the song is not a drug addict. In another analysis by Wiwibloggs' Lucy Percy, they claimed that in the song's beginning, the duo is raided in a police drug sting. According to Percy, they deny that they are drug addicts because the duo isn't wealthy, and thus can't buy drugs; albeit, they drink IPAs and wear sunglasses to hide their pupils. Percy later wrote that the mention of the duo being poor "hints at how wealth can impact the way police perceive people... because they're poor, they need to defend themselves and deny everything. Or it could just be a glorious piece of intelligent humour."

The two groups were officially announced to compete in Eesti Laul 2024 on 6 November 2023. The song, along with an accompanying music video, officially premiered on Eesti Rahvusringhääling's digital app on 8 December. The song was later performed live for the first time on 23 December.

== Critical reception ==
Reception from beat reporters has largely been negative with some highly positive exceptions, but even several negative reviews conceded the high audience appeal of the song.

In a Wiwibloggs review containing several reviews from several critics, the song was rated 5.4 out of 10 points, ranking 30th out of the 37 songs competing in the Eurovision Song Contest 2024 on the site's annual ranking. Another review conducted by ESC Bubble that contained reviews from a combination of readers and juries rated the song 12th out of the 16 songs in the Eurovision semi-final it was in. Vulture's Jon O'Brien ranked the song 36th and second-last overall, calling the song a "Käärijä knockoff"; its "wordy title" and "deranged dad dancing" would leave the rest of Europe scratching their heads. ESC Beat's Doron Lahav ranked the song as his overall last place, stating that he found the song "too messy" and while he saw it "as an effort to showcase creativity", he "was left confused at the end of listening". Erin Adam of The Scotsman rated the song 3 out of 10 points, stating that while she did not personally like the entry, she conceded that the song was a "fun high tempo entry that can do well in the televote".

In contrast, National Public Radio's (NPR) Glen Weldon included it in his list of 10 overall favourites to win the contest. It was the favourite entry of German comedian Johannes Floehr, who commented "Those boys make me proud to be Estonian. And I am German." Ewan Spence of website ESCInsight hailed the audience participation ignited by the song: "Everyone in the crowd just ended up shouting "HEY" very loudly with the beat of the song before doing their TikTok-friendly Veisson dance."

== Music video and promotion ==
Along with the song's release, an accompanying music video was released on the same day. To further promote the song, they announced their intents to participate in various Eurovision pre-parties throughout the month of April, including the Barcelona Eurovision Party 2024 on 6 April, the London Eurovision Party 2024 on 7 April, and the Nordic Eurovision Party 2024 on 14 April.

== Eurovision Song Contest ==
=== Eesti Laul 2024 ===
Estonia's broadcaster Eesti Rahvusringhääling (ERR) organized a 20-entry competition, Eesti Laul 2024, the sixteenth iteration of the national final. It consisted of a semi-final held on 20 January 2024, which separated into two rounds and later culminated into a grand final to select its entrant for the Eurovision Song Contest 2024. The semi-final featured 15 entries, and in the first round, the top three, selected by a 50/50 vote of televote and juries, earned a berth in the grand final with five other automatic grand final entrants. In the second round, the remaining 12 songs competed for two spots that was selected by televoting. The winner of the ten-song final was selected similarly; a 50/50 vote of televote and juries selected the top three to move into a superfinal, and a televote determined the overall winner of the contest.

"(Nendest) narkootikumidest ei tea me (küll) midagi" was announced to compete in the contest on 6 November 2023. The song was later drawn to perform first in the semi-final. The performance was interpreted by ESC United's Boris Meersman to be an extension of the song's meaning; the members of 5miinust were interpreted to be "incompetent drug dealers" and Puuluup since as "hostage[s]". An eye displayed in the staging's background is also shown, which was interpreted as a way to show that "when we want to connect to people, we look at their eyes first, so putting one in the middle directs the audience to focus their attention on what is happening right in front of it".

The song qualified in the first round, and was later drawn to perform ninth in the final that took place on 17 February. In the grand final, they were able to advance to the superfinal and later won the superfinal with 26,422 votes, over double more than the second-place finisher. As a result, the song won the rights to represent Estonia in the Eurovision Song Contest 2024.

=== At Eurovision ===
The Eurovision Song Contest 2024 took place at the Malmö Arena in Malmö, Sweden, and consists of two semi-finals held on the respective dates of 7 and 9 May and the final on 11 May 2024. During the allocation draw on 30 January 2024, Estonia was drawn to compete in the second semi-final, performing in the second half of the show. The duo were later drawn to perform 13th in the semi-final, after Belgium's Mustii and before Israel's Eden Golan.

Before Eurovision, Kohver stated plans to change the lyrics of the song. In March 2024, it was announced that in order to comply with Eurovision regulations prohibiting any reference to trademarks, a mention of "green Lay's" chips would be replaced with "deposit bottles". The Eurovision performance features both groups dressed in black suits, with Puuluup playing talharpas. All members wear black, performing the "veisson" dance occasionally throughout the performance. The lighting also changes occasionally, featuring yellow, pink, and green; the same is also displayed for the background LEDs. The song finished in sixth, scoring 79 points and securing a position in the grand final.

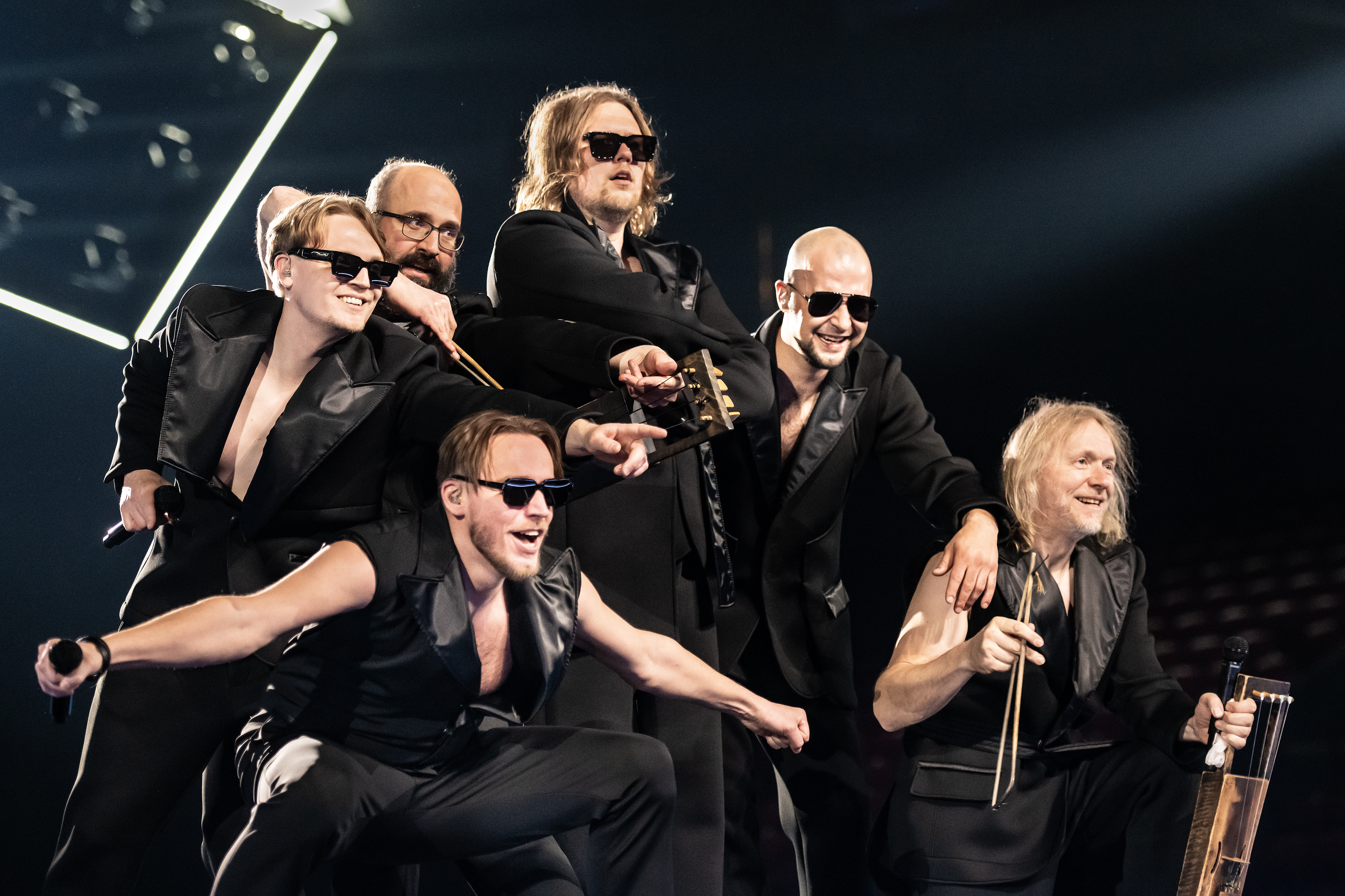
Both bands performing the song at a dress rehearsal before the Eurovision 2024 grand final.

Both bands performed a repeat of their performance in the grand final on 11 May. The song was performed ninth in the final, after Spain's Nebulossa and before Ireland's Bambie Thug. After the results were announced, they finished 20th with a total of 37 points, with split score of four points from juries and 33 points from public televoting. Regarding the former, only Austria and Italy gave the song two points each. However, it managed to earn one set of 12 points from the public televote from the country of Latvia. In response to their result, members of both bands expressed satisfaction; they jokingly called their greatest disappointment to have finished one point and position behind Finland.

== Awards and nominations ==
Year	Award	Category	Result	Ref.
2025	Estonian Music Awards	Song of the Year	Nominated	

== Charts ==
=== Weekly charts ===
Weekly chart performance for "(Nendest) narkootikumidest ei tea me (küll) midagi"
Chart (2024)	Peak position
Estonia Airplay (Radiomonitor)	1
Estonia Airplay (TopHit)	16
Finland (Suomen virallinen lista)	49
Greece International (IFPI)	57
Latvia Streaming (LaIPA)	11
Lithuania (AGATA)	16
Sweden Heatseeker (Sverigetopplistan)	7
UK Singles Downloads (Official Charts)	99

=== Monthly charts ===
Monthly chart performance for "(Nendest) narkootikumidest ei tea me (küll) midagi"
Chart (2024)	Peak position
Estonia Airplay (TopHit)	24

=== Year-end charts ===
Year-end chart performance for "(Nendest) narkootikumidest ei tea me (küll) midagi"
Chart (2024)	Peak position
Estonia Airplay (TopHit)	83

== Release history ==
Release history and formats for "(Nendest) narkootikumidest ei tea me (küll) midagi"
Country	Date	Format(s)	Version	Label	Ref.
Various	8 December 2023	Digital download; streaming	Original	Universal Music Oy	
Various	18 July 2024	Digital download; streaming	Planeet and Muul remix	Universal Music Oy	
