= Alika Milova =

Estonian singer-songwriter (born 2002)

Alika
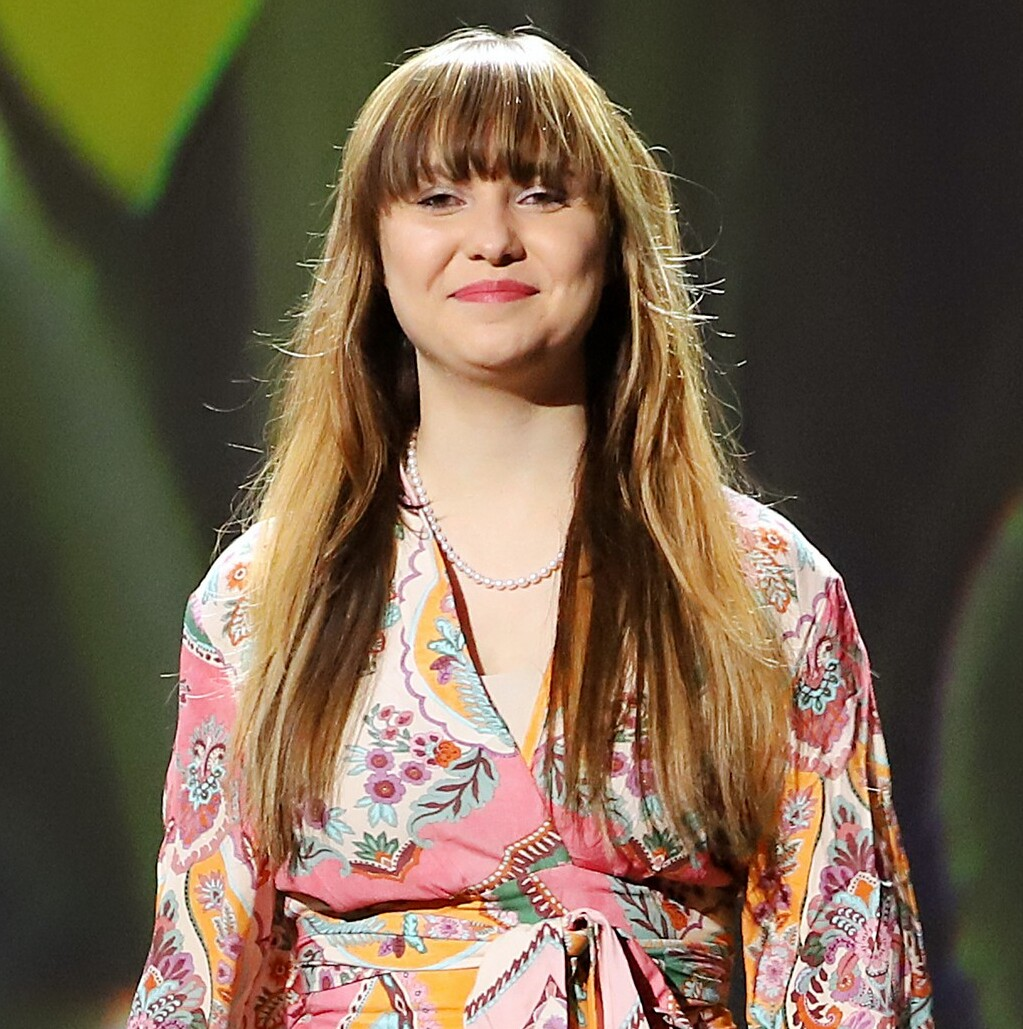
- Alika in 2022

Background information
- Born: Alika Milova; 5 September 2002 (age 24); Narva, Estonia
- Occupations: Singer; songwriter
- Years active: 2021–present
- Label: Universal Music Group

Alika Milova (Note: Russian: Алика Милова) (born 5 September 2002), known mononymously as Alika, is an Estonian singer. She represented Estonia in the Eurovision Song Contest 2023 with the song "Bridges", finishing in eighth place with 168 points.

== Musical career ==
Milova made her name by participating in various singing competitions and television programs in Estonia and abroad since childhood, including The Baltic Voice, New Wave Junior, Kaunas Talent, Bravo Song Contest and Berlin Perle. She rose to prominence in 2021 with her victory at the eighth edition of the Estonian talent show Eesti otsib superstaari, which earned her a record deal with Universal Music Group.

On 1 November 2022, it was announced that she would participate in Eesti Laul 2023 with the song "Bridges". She participated in Semi Final 2 and qualified for the final. On 11 February 2023, Milova performed in the final, where televoting chose her as the winner among the 12 participants to become their national representative at the Eurovision Song Contest 2023 in Liverpool.

At Liverpool, Alika performed in the first half of the second semi-final and placed 10th, qualifying for the final. In the grand final, Milova ultimately placed 8th with a score of 168 points.

On 14 August 2023, Alika announced on her Instagram account that her debut album would be released on 24 November. This debut album, titled simply 'Alika', won Debut Album of the Year at the Estonian Music Awards 2024 (Eesti Muusikaauhinnad 2024) held on 1 February 2024. At the same awards ceremony, Alika also won Artist of the Year, Female Artist of the Year, Album of the Year and Song of the Year with her Eurovision entry Bridges.

On 29 November 2024, Alika released her EP "Virmalised" (in Estonian: Northern Lights), which is an independent release. This EP contains three previously released singles "Mis minuga saab?", "Saame kokku" and "Virmalised", and two new songs "Silmapiir" and "Ära ava".

In October 2024, Alika appeared in MasterChef Eesti, Estonian version of MasterChef broadcast on TV channel Telia Eesti.

She won season 10 of Su nägu kõlab tuttavalt (Estonian version of Your Face Sounds Familiar) in 2025.

== Personal life ==
Milova was born into a Russian-speaking family in the Estonian border town of Narva. Originally, most of her family is from Simferopol, Crimea; members of her family that still lived there moved to Kyiv after the Russian invasion and occupation of Crimea in 2014. Milova's sister, Valeria Milova, is a professional dancer and choreographer who has appeared on the Turkish and Irish versions of Dancing with the Stars. Together with her husband Vitali Kozmin, Valeria co-created the ballroom dance stage production Ballroom Theatre, for which Alika provided her vocals.

== Discography ==
=== Studio albums ===
List of studio albums, with selected details
Title	Details
Alika	Released: 24 November 2023; Label: Universal; Format: Digital download, streaming

=== Extended plays ===
List of EPs, with selected details
Title	Details
Virmalised	Released: 29 November 2024; Label: AM Music; Format: Digital download, streaming

=== Singles ===
List of singles, with selected chart positions
Title	Year	Peak chart positions						Album or EP
Title	Year	EST Air. (Note: The TopHit airplay chart for Estonia began publication in January 2023. Radiomonitor data is used for the peak positions from the earlier period.)	ICE	LTU	NLD Tip	SWE Heat.	UK Down.	Album or EP
"Õnnenumber"	2021	5	—	—	—	—	—	Non-album single
"Bon appetit"	2022	12	—	—	—	—	—	Alika
"C'est la vie"	2022	—	—	—	—	—	—	Alika
"Bridges"	2022	—	40	20	23	17	51	Alika
"You"	2023	—	—	—	—	—	—	Alika
"Too Much"	2023	—	—	—	—	—	—	Alika
"Lihtsalt veab"	2023	—	—	—	—	—	—	Alika
"Õde ütles"	2023	—	—	—	—	—	—	Alika
"Mis minuga saab?" (featuring Villemdrillem)	2024	—	—	—	—	—	—	Virmalised
"Saame kokku"	2024	—	—	—	—	—	—	Virmalised
"Virmalised"	2024	—	—	—	—	—	—	Virmalised
"Parasiit" (with Säm)	2025	6	—	—	—	—	—	Non-album singles
"K.A.S."	2025	86	—	—	—	—	—	Non-album singles
"Motiiv"	2026	—	—	—	—	—	—	Non-album singles
"Uju või upu" (with Arg Part)	2026	—	—	—	—	—	—	Non-album singles
"Laagna tee"	2026	—	—	—	—	—	—	Non-album singles
"Kissitavad silmad" (with Säm)	2026	15	—	—	—	—	—	Non-album singles
"—" denotes a recording that did not chart or was not released in that territory. "*" denotes that the chart did not exist at that time.

== Notes ==
Awards and achievements
Preceded by Uudo Sepp	Eesti otsib superstaari winner 2021	Succeeded by Ant Nurhan
Preceded by Stefan with "Hope"	Estonia in the Eurovision Song Contest; 2023	Succeeded by 5miinust and Puuluup with "(Nendest) narkootikumidest ei tea me (küll) midagi"
