= Johannes Floehr =

German comedian and writer

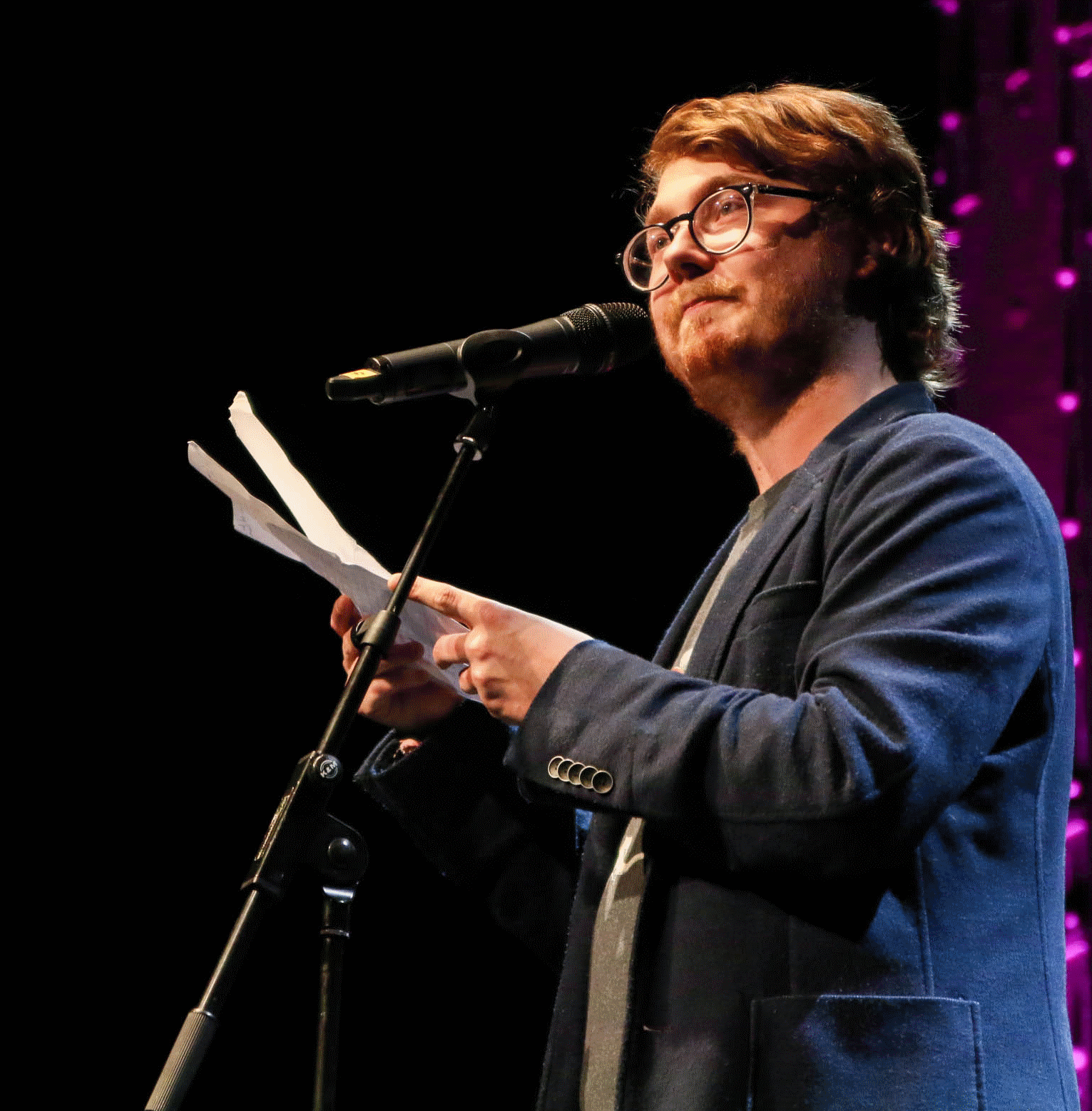
Johannes Floehr in 2016

Johannes Floehr is a German author and comedian based in Hamburg.

Floehr started his career performing slam poetry, winning several Poetry Slams in Germany, Austria and Switzerland. 2011 he was acting as himself in the satiric movie Die PARTEI. 2014 he won the Heinrich Heine Jugendliteraturpreis in Dusseldorf, a literature contest for young poets. As a guest of the Federal Foreign Office he visited Tallinn, the capital of Estonia, to write poems with the students of an Estonian school in 2016.

He has published two books: Buch (2018) is a collection of short stories, while Dialoge is a collection of Floehr's tweets. Both books has been published by Lektora Verlag. Currently he is on tour with his satiric comedy programme Ich bin genau mein Humor. In the year 2020 he won Rostocker Koggenzieher (in silver), a competition for Kabarett with his programme. Regularly he is a guest in TV shows like Comedy Talent Show (SRF) or Olafs Klub (MDR).

Floehr actively supports antifascist and multicultural causes. To this extent, he has joined protests against events organized by the right-wing party Alternative for Germany in his hometown Krefeld. One of his short stories also touches the issue of Islamophobia, with Floehr remarking with a wholehearted "Yes!" that Islam is a part of Germany. He is a fan of the Eurovision Song Contest.

== Works ==
- Buch (2018) ISBN 978-3-95461-110-2
- Dialoge (2019) ISBN 978-3-95461-141-6
- Abendkasse: Eure schlimmsten Bühnenstorys (2021) ISBN 978-3954612031
- Buch 2 (2022) ISBN 978-3954612369
- FLEURS (2025) ISBN 978-3954612727
