= Espresso Macchiato (song) =

2024 single by Tommy Cash

Single by Tommy Cash
- Language: Italian-English; Macaronic
- Released: 6 December 2024
- Genre: Dance-pop
- Length: 2:53
- Composers: Tomas Tammemets; Johannes Naukkarinen
- Lyricist: Johannes Naukkarinen
- Producer: Johannes Naukkarinen

Tommy Cash singles chronology
"Untz Untz" (2024)	"Espresso Macchiato" (2024)	"OK" (2025)

Music videos
- "Espresso Macchiato" on YouTube "Espresso Macchiato" (alternative version) on YouTube

Eurovision Song Contest 2025 entry
- Country: Estonia

Finals performance
- Semi-final result: 5th
- Semi-final points: 113
- Final result: 3rd
- Final points: 356

Entry chronology
- ◄ "(Nendest) narkootikumidest ei tea me (küll) midagi" (2024)
- "Too Epic to Be True" (2026) ►

Official performance video
- "Espresso Macchiato" (first semi-final) on YouTube "Espresso Macchiato" (grand final) on YouTube

"Espresso Macchiato" is a song by Estonian rapper Tommy Cash. It was written by the artist and Johannes Naukkarinen, and interpolates the overture of "The Barber of Seville" by Gioachino Rossini. The song was self-released on 6 December 2024. Self-described as a song that details the story of an Italian man that features numerous references to stereotypes of Italian culture, "Espresso Macchiato" represented Estonia in the Eurovision Song Contest 2025, where it placed third with 356 points.

The song received heavily divisive reception. It was well received by some critics for its uniqueness and its high energy musical composition. However, the song was heavily criticised by others for its lyrics, finding the Macaronic lyrics and their content to be meaningless or offensive towards Italians and their culture. The latter complaints led to unsuccessful calls from some Italian government officials and organisations for the song's exclusion from the contest.

To promote the song, two music videos were released alongside a remix of the song by Italian rapper Tony Effe. "Espresso Macchiato" enjoyed widespread commercial success in Europe, peaking at number one in its native Estonia. The song additionally peaked at number two in five countries, within the top five in six additional countries, and within the top ten in four more countries.

== Background and composition ==
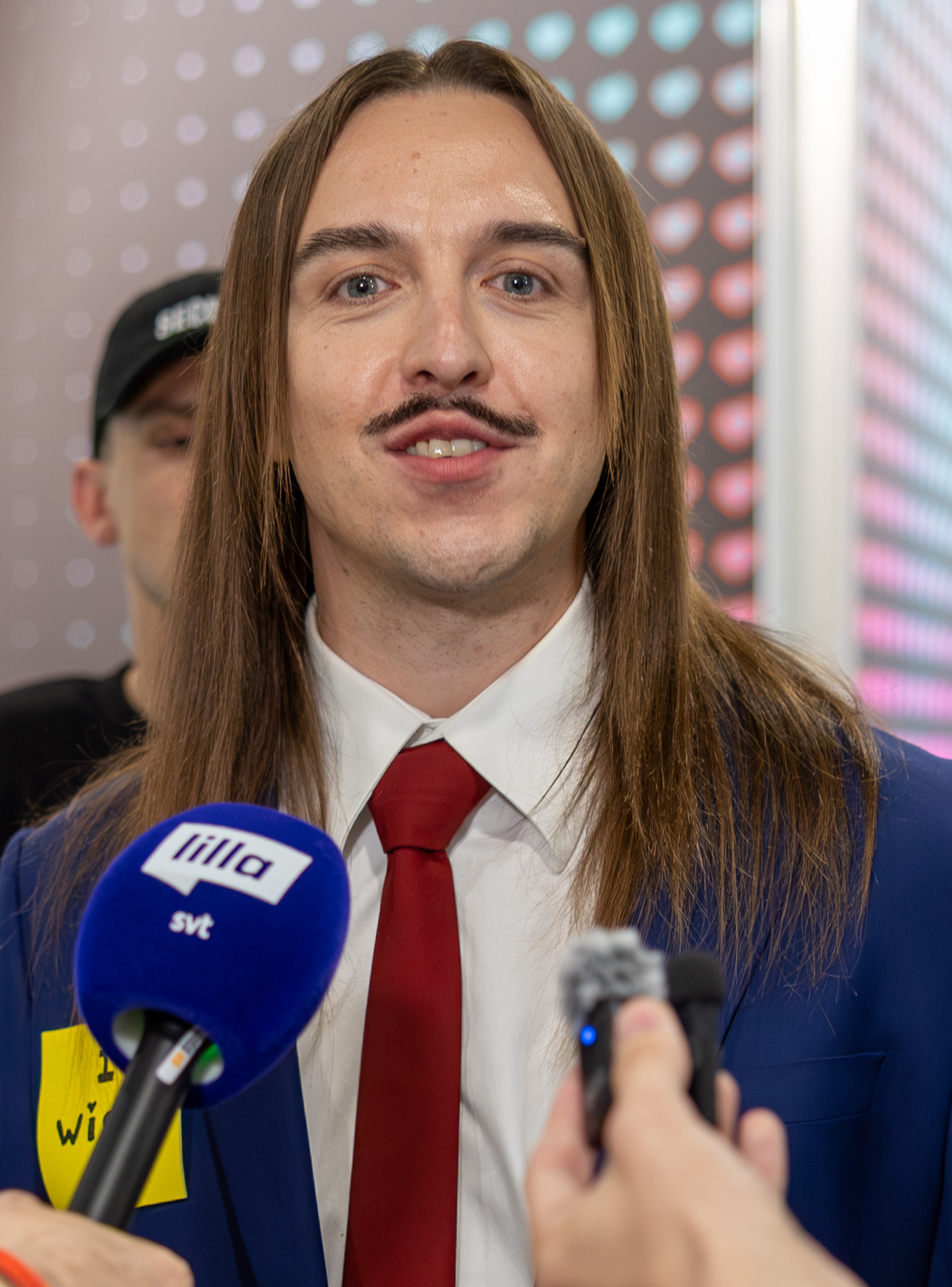
"Espresso Macchiato" was sung by Estonian rapper Tommy Cash (pictured in 2025).

"Espresso Macchiato" was written by Tomas Tammemets (known professionally as Tommy Cash) and Johannes Naukkarinen, with production handled by Naukkarinen. The song was recorded in the ArtDepoo Gallery in Tallinn. It has been described by media outlets as a song with a typical rap flow. The lyrics feature a Macaronic mixture of broken English, Spanglish, and the Broccolino dialect of American Italian, with Cash singing the lyrics in a stereotypical Italian accent. In an interview with Corriere della Sera, Cash stated that "Espresso Macchiato" was the "most innocent song in my discography... I wanted to be strategic, making a song that everyone from 2 to 78 would like." Prior to the contest, Cash released various projects, including "Untz Untz", a song that combined "sex and sport" to create a "Sex Olympics" which featured various sexual acts in the song's music video. "Espresso Macchiato" was released on 6 December 2024 alongside all other songs competing in Eesti Laul 2025, Estonia's national selection for the Eurovision Song Contest 2025. He later stated that he was convinced to release the song after hearing his grandmother's reaction to the song.

According to Cash, who often creates comedic songs on provocative issues, the song is inspired by trips that he took to Italy where he often recorded music, stating that the words "espresso macchiato" popped into his head with "zero references to anything else, zero anything". He added in Rolling Stone Italia that the story behind the song was "silly", with Cash remembering the words after recommending his producer to order an espresso macchiato during a trip in Italy. He was later inspired to enter the Eurovision Song Contest after the reception of his previous single "Untz Untz", stating to the BBC, "My career is pretty colourful, and I've done so many interesting projects. You know, why not have Eurovision on my Wikipedia page and put my name in the history books of my country?"

"Espresso Macchiato" features lyrics about spaghetti, mafia figures, and numerous other stereotypes associated with Italian culture, which has made it a subject of notable controversy in the Italian press. In Rolling Stone Italia, Cash stated the song was made to represent himself as a person who "sees happiness in the little things", stating that although he has been involved in the music scene for years, "I still feel like that guy who can enjoy the little moments, tiny things like a coffee." In an analysis from Tallinn University professor Daniele Monticelli, he described the song as a story about Italians, their history, and their stereotypes. Monticelli refers to the Italian diaspora to the United States, the poor state of the Italian economy before World War II that led to many Italians emigrating from Italy, and the subsequent economic recovery to Italy in the 1950s that led to the creation of the dolce vita concept and subsequently, the stereotypes portrayed in "Espresso Macchiato". In another analysis from Wiwibloggs' Ruxandra Tudor, the song was described as a "fun little parody, playfully mocking an Italian lifestyle" that told the story of an Italian ristorante owner named Tomaso addicted to coffee and tobacco. In the song, Tudor stated that Tomaso grew from being poor to being extremely rich through hard work and subsequently, the assistance of coffee.

== Music video and promotion ==
Along with the song's release, two accompanying music videos were made and released on 6 December 2024 and 16 March 2025, respectively. The first video was released alongside all other songs competing in Eesti Laul 2025, and features Cash drinking a cup of coffee. The video was inspired by a scene from 1982 Danish film 66 Scenes from America where American artist Andy Warhol eats a hamburger. The second video was directed by Alina Pyazok and filmed in the Spanish city of Barcelona. The video features Cash playing two characters, with one wearing a black suit and another wearing a brown suit. After the two perform a dance sequence, the two share a coffee with straws, which causes the two characters to combine into each other. The second half of the music video features a "surreal world" with numerous cameos, including Estonian sign language interpreter Jegor Andrejev and four dancers posing as Cash's bodyguards: Kajtek Januszkiewicz, Aleksandr Luksha, Alexander Makarov, and Jene' Walker. The final shot of the video features Cash flying away on a coffee bean-shaped balloon. To promote the song, he performed the song live on Italian talk show Stasera c'è Cattelan su Rai 2 on 15 April 2025. Cash additionally released a remix of "Espresso Macchiato" with Italian rapper Tony Effe on 9 May.

== Reception ==
=== Critical reception ===
In a Wiwibloggs review containing several reviews from several critics, the song was rated 5.03 out of 10 points, earning 32nd out of the 37 songs competing in that year's Eurovision in the site's annual ranking that year. ESC Beat's Doron Lahav ranked the song last overall, writing that he found the Macaronic lyrics to be "questionable and even disrespectful". He added that he thought the song overall was "infantile". Jon O'Brien, a writer for Vulture, ranked the song 21st overall, criticising the lyrics of the song for a lack of meaning but admitting that the "electro-swing 'We No Speak Americano'–esque sound isn't so offensive". Rob Picheta, writer for American outlet CNN, ranked it 11th out of the 26 finalists in Eurovision 2025, describing the song as a "gimmicky spectacle that caricatures Italian coffee culture". The Times' Ed Potton ranked it first overall out of all 26 finalists, rating it five out of five stars. He praised it for having "the lot — chantable chorus, pumping danceability, a vision of Italy worthy of a Dolmio ad and the most magnificent wobbly-legged dancing this side of the Wigan Casino". He added that he thought the song was the representation of "peak Eurovision". Yle's Eva Frantz gave the song a 10 out of 10 rating, proclaiming it as "this year's most boisterous entry" and stating that the song was "so fluffy it's brilliant". Aftenposten's Robert Hoftun Gjestad rated the song a 6 out of 6, praising the musical composition and comedic nature of the song.

The Daily Telegraph's Ed Power put the song third on his top 10 finalists to watch list, writing that the song's staging for Eurovision was "memorable". The BBC's Mark Savage described the song as one of two in the contest that "suck[ed] up to Italy", calling it "more memorable, but definitely more unhinged" than Gabry Ponte's "Tutta l'Italia". The Guardian's Angelica Frey included the song in her top ten best Eurovision 2025 songs list, comparing the song to DJ Ötzi's "Pronto Giuseppe!". Frey later added that the song was a representative of the Italian brainrot trend. Another reporter from The Guardian, Michael Hogan, described the song as "infernally catchy", adding that the song was "delivered in an accent worthy of a Dolmio ad". LaC News24's Luca Arnaù defined "Espresso Macchiato" as "not a song", but rather "an experience. An experiment. An ode to the Italian macchietta, peppered with lyrics that sound like they came out of Google Translate on acid". Oggi's Stefano Braghiroli stated that he found the song "bizarre - and perhaps a bit cheeky - rather than offensive". He further stated that he thought Cash had the intention of writing the song for Italians to like it, adding, "In this we notice perhaps a bit of dissonance. More than stereotypes, we note perhaps a rough knowledge of our country, without malice, but with curiosity."

=== Unsuccessful complaints for exclusion ===
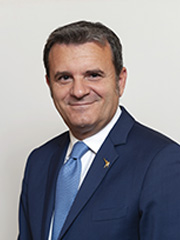
Some Italian politicians and organizations, including Lega Nord member Gian Marco Centinaio, unsuccessfully called for the song's exclusion.

Following the song's victory at Eesti Laul 2025, the song received complaints from some Italian organisations and politicians. Italian consumers' association Codacons requested the European Broadcasting Union (EBU), the sanctioning body for the Eurovision Song Contest, to disqualify the song for "convey[ing] a message of a population tied to organized crime" in February 2025. In addition, numerous politicians of Italian conservative party Lega Nord, including Gian Marco Centinaio, vice President of the Senate of the Republic, also called for the song's disqualification, with Centinalo proclaiming on Instagram, "Whoever insults Italy should stay out of Eurovision. This singer should come to our country to see how decent people work before he presses himself to write such stupid songs." In response to Italian criticism, Cash stated in a Rai Radio 2 interview that "I love Italy and have the utmost respect for the country", adding that he did not think the song would cause negative reception amongst Italians.

== Eurovision Song Contest ==
=== Eesti Laul 2025 ===
Estonia's national broadcaster Eesti Rahvusringhääling (ERR) organised Eesti Laul 2025, the 17th iteration of the national final to select Estonia's representative for the Eurovision Song Contest. The competition featured 16 songs in a standalone grand final on 15 February 2025. The winner of the competition was selected over two rounds of voting. The top three placing songs in the final advanced into a superfinal, with the winner of the superfinal winning the competition. In the first round, the songs were selected by a 50/50 split of juries and public televoting. In the superfinal, the winning song was selected solely by televote.

Cash was announced as a participant on 5 November 2024 with "Espresso Macchiato", with Cash being drawn to perform 15th in the final. In the grand final, he finished in first in both the juries and public televoting, earning the maximum 16 points in each category for a total of 32 points. In the superfinal, Cash earned 41,414 televotes, approximately 83.86% of the total televotes and over 37,000 more than runner-up song "Ma ei tea sind" by Andrei Zevakin. As a result of winning the competition, Cash earned the right to represent Estonia in the Eurovision Song Contest 2025.

=== At Eurovision ===
The Eurovision Song Contest 2025 took place at the St. Jakobshalle in Basel, Switzerland, and consisted of two semi-finals held on the respective dates of 13 and 15 May and the final on 17 May 2025. During the allocation draw held on 28 January 2025, Estonia was drawn to compete in the first semi-final in the first half of the show. Cash was later drawn to perform in fourth, after Slovenia's Klemen Slakonja and before Ukraine's Ziferblat.

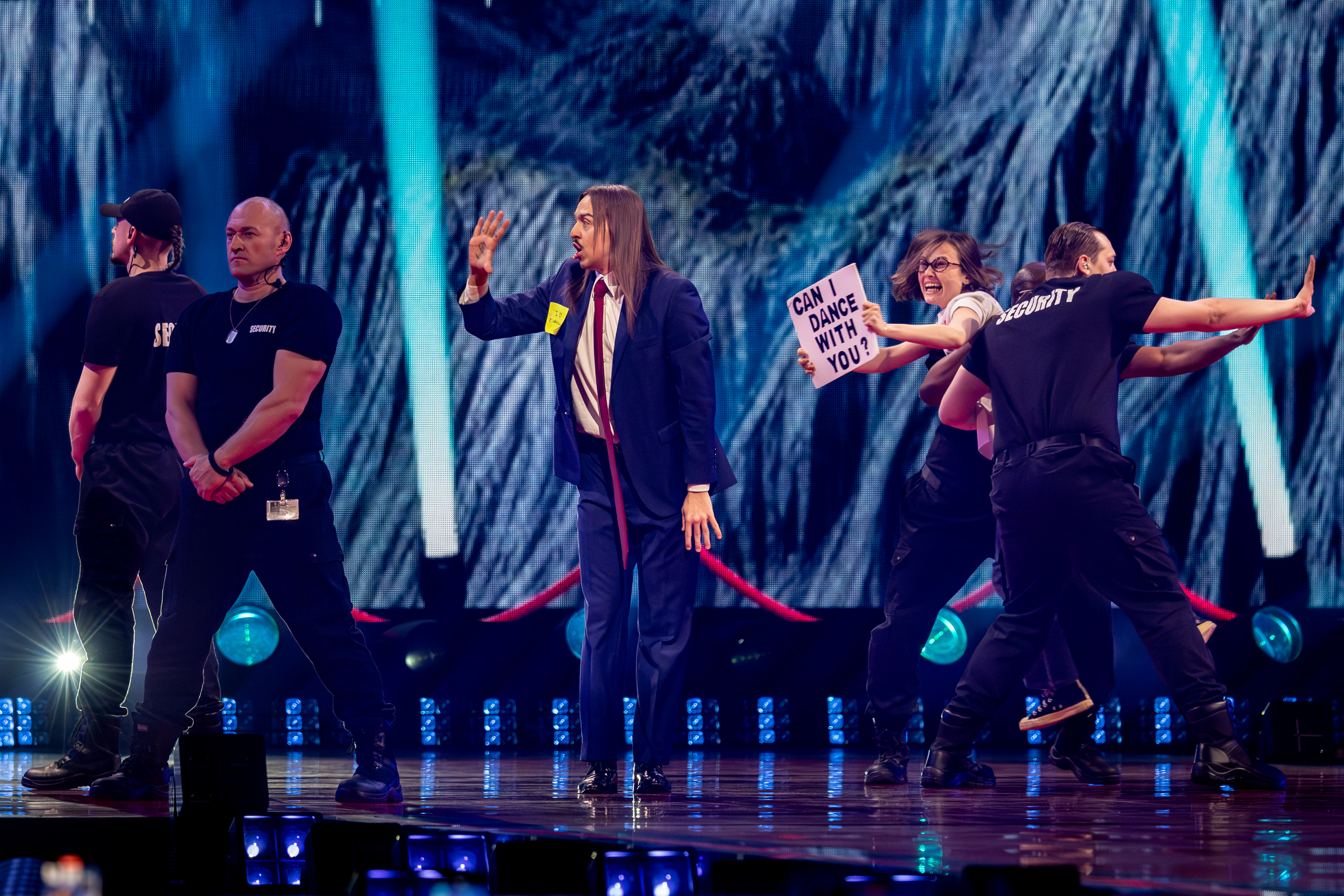
Cash performing "Espresso Macchiato" at a dress rehearsal before the Eurovision 2025 grand final. The picture features Anastasiia Lider, acting as a stage invader, being restrained by Cash's bodyguards.

For its Eurovision performance, Alina Pasok was appointed as the staging director. The performance featured Cash in a blue and white suit with a red tie, with a yellow sticky note attached to the jacket saying "I Love Eurovision". Cash performed alongside five backing dancers. Four of the dancers featured in his music video appeared again as the mock bodyguards for Cash, standing around and assisting him during the performance. A fifth dancer, Anastasiia Lider, acted as a stage invader. The beginning of the performance features Cash amongst a background featuring the "Winner's Cafe", holding a coffee cup. Throughout the performance, Cash performs dance moves inspired by the stringy and bouncy nature of spaghetti amongst backgrounds of the Alps, a plane with Tommy Cash's signature on it, and a mountain featuring a parody of the Hollywood Sign that says "Tommywood". Nearing the end of the performance, Lider, posing as a "super fan" of Cash, rushes the stage and eventually dances with Cash after a scuffle with security. "Espresso Macchiato" secured a position in the grand final, finishing in fifth in its semi-final with 113 points.

Cash performed a repeat of his performance in the grand final on 17 May. The song performed third, after Luxembourg's Laura Thorn and before Israel's Yuval Raphael. After the results were announced, Cash finished in third with a total score of 356 points, with a split score of 98 jury points and 258 televoting points. Regarding the former, the song did not receive any sets of the maximum 12 points; the maximum points received was a two sets of 10 points from Belgium and Italy. However, the song did receive five sets of the maximum 12 points from the public televote. In response to his result, Cash stated that he was sorry he came one point from tying with Israel, stating that there was a "bit of a political tug".

== Charts ==
=== Weekly charts ===
Weekly chart performance
Chart (2025)	Peak position
Austria (Ö3 Austria Top 40)	3
Belgium (Ultratop 50 Flanders)	4
CIS Airplay (TopHit)	97
Croatia International Airplay (Top lista)	5
Czech Republic Airplay (ČNS IFPI)	11
Czech Republic Singles Digital (ČNS IFPI)	41
Estonia Airplay (TopHit)	1
Finland (Suomen virallinen lista)	3
Finland Airplay (Radiosoittolista)	18
Germany (GfK)	12
Global 200 (Billboard)	93
Greece International (IFPI)	2
Iceland (Tónlistinn)	3
Ireland (IRMA)	49
Israel (Mako Hitlist)	31
Italy (FIMI)	69
Italy (FIMI) Tony Effe Remix	53
Latvia Streaming (LaIPA)	2
Lithuania (AGATA)	7
Lithuania Airplay (TopHit)	1
Luxembourg (Billboard)	4
Netherlands (Dutch Top 40)	17
Netherlands (Single Top 100)	9
North Macedonia Airplay (Radiomonitor)	18
Norway (VG-lista)	5
Poland (Polish Streaming Top 100)	14
Portugal (AFP)	75
Russia Streaming (TopHit)	25
Slovakia Airplay (ČNS IFPI)	57
Slovakia Singles Digital (ČNS IFPI)	71
Slovenia Airplay (Radiomonitor)	15
Spain (Promusicae)	37
Suriname (Nationale Top 40)	16
Sweden (Sverigetopplistan)	3
Switzerland (Schweizer Hitparade)	2
UK Singles (Official Charts)	40
UK Independent (Official Charts)	8

2026 weekly chart performance for "Espresso Macchiato"
Chart (2026)	Peak position
Estonia Airplay (TopHit)	45
North Macedonia Airplay (Radiomonitor)	11

=== Monthly charts ===
Monthly chart performance for "Espresso Macchiato"
Chart (2025)	Peak position
Estonia Airplay (TopHit)	1
Lithuania Airplay (TopHit)	1
Russia Streaming (TopHit)	33

=== Year-end charts ===
Year-end chart performance
Chart (2025)	Peak position
Austria (Ö3 Austria Top 40)	42
Belgium (Ultratop 50 Flanders)	65
Estonia Airplay (TopHit)	3
Iceland (Tónlistinn)	28
Lithuania Airplay (TopHit)	12
Russia Streaming (TopHit)	131
Sweden (Sverigetopplistan)	61

=== Decade-end charts ===
20s Decade-end chart performance
Chart (2025–2026)	Position
Russia Streaming (TopHit)	191

== Certifications ==
Certifications for "Espresso Macchiato"
Region	Certification	Certified units/sales
Austria (IFPI Austria)	Gold	15,000^{‡}
Spain (Promusicae)	Gold	50,000^{‡}
^{‡} Sales+streaming figures based on certification alone.

== Release history ==
Release history and format for "Espresso Macchiato"
Country	Date	Format(s)	Version	Label	Ref.
Various	6 December 2024	Digital download; streaming	Single track	Self-released	
Various	9 May 2025	Digital download; streaming	Tony Effe remix	Self-released	
