= Vanilla Ninja discography =

- Studio albums: 5
- Compilation albums: 2
- Singles: 15
- Music videos: 12
- DVD: 2

This is a comprehensive listing of official releases by Estonian pop-rock band Vanilla Ninja.

== Albums ==
=== Studio albums ===
Year	Title	Chart positions							Certifications
Year	Title	EST	GER	AUT	SWI	CZE	POL	EUR	Certifications
2003	Vanilla Ninja: First studio album; Released: May 30, 2003; Formats: CD; Singles: 1	1	—	—	—	—	—	—	Estonia (Platinum)
2004	Traces of Sadness: Second studio album; Released: June 7, 2004; Formats: CD; Singles: 4	1	3	4	14	37	37	—	Germany (Gold); Austria (Gold); Estonia (Platinum)
2005	Blue Tattoo: Third studio album; Released: March 14, 2005; Formats: CD; Singles: 4	1	4	7	4	55	19	14	Estonia (Platinum)
2006	Love Is War: Fourth studio album; Released: May 19, 2006; Formats: CD; Singles: 3	1	16	29	14	—	48	—	Estonia (Platinum)
2021	Encore: Fifth studio album; Released: October 8, 2021; Formats: CD; Singles: 1	—	13	44	31	—	—	—	—
		EST	GER	AUT	SUI	CZE	POL	EUR	
	Number one albums	4	0	0	0	0	0	0	
	Top ten albums	4	2	2	1	0	0	0	

=== Compilation albums ===
Year	Title	Chart positions
Year	Title	SWI
2005	Silent Emotions: Hits compilation; Released: November 16, 2005; Formats: CD	—
2005	Best Of: Hits compilation; Released: December 2, 2005; Formats: CD	70
2026	The Hits: Hits compilation; Released: May 12, 2026; Formats: CD, digital download	—
		SWI
	Number one albums	0
	Top ten albums	0

== Singles ==
Year	Single	Album	Peak chart positions						
Year	Single	Album	EST	GER	AUT	SWI	POL	FIN	EUR
2003	"Club Kung Fu"	Vanilla Ninja	—	95	—	—	—	—	—
2003	"Tough Enough"	Traces of Sadness	1	13	16	52	4	11	52
2004	"Don't Go Too Fast"	Traces of Sadness	1	23	33	53	16	—	83
2004	"Liar" / "Heartless"	Traces of Sadness	4	23	22	43	—	—	76
2004	"When the Indians Cry"	Traces of Sadness	1	8	7	27	4	—	35
2004	"Blue Tattoo"	Blue Tattoo	—	9	16	12	22	—	26
2005	"I Know"	Blue Tattoo	32	13	17	27	2	—	45
2005	"I Know (Unplugged)"	Blue Tattoo	—	—	—	—	—	—	—
2005	"Cool Vibes"	Blue Tattoo	3	42	58	17	—	—	91
2005	"Megamix"	Best Of	—	79	—	66	—	—	—
2006	"Dangerzone"	Love Is War	3	21	23	18	1	—	102
2006	"Rockstarz"	Love Is War	1	86	—	—	8	—	—
2007	"Insane in Vain" (Released only in Estonian radio stations)	Love Is War	18	—	—	—	—	—	—
2008	"Birds of Peace"	Love Is War (Latin America version)	3	—	—	—	—	—	—
2008	"Crashing Through The Doors"	Non Album Track	1	—	—	—	—	—	—
2021	"Gotta Get It Right"	Encore	—	—	—	—	—	—	—
		Number one hits	5	0	0	0	1	0	0
		Top ten hits	9	2	1	0	5	0	0

== Music videos ==
#	Year	Title	Director	Place
1.	2003	"Nagu Rockstaar"		Tallinn, Estonia
2.	2003	"Tough Enough"	Mathias Vielsäcker, Christoph Mangler	Berlin, Germany
3.	2004	"Don't Go Too Fast"	Mathias Vielsäcker, Christoph Mangler	Berlin, Germany
4.	2004	"Liar"	Carsten Gutschmidt, Bernard Wedig	Germany
5.	2004	"When the Indians Cry"	Mathias Vielsäcker, Christoph Mangler	(Spain) Playa Caragol, Mallorca
6.	2004	"Blue Tattoo"	Sascha Kramer, David Brandes	Iceland
7.	2005	"I Know"	Sascha Kramer	Frankfurt am Main, Berlin, Germany
8.	2005	"I Know (Unplugged)"		
9.	2005	"Cool Vibes"		
10.	2005	"Megamix"	video collage	
11.	2006	"Dangerzone"	Jeffrey Lisk & Bernd Possardt	Cape Town, South Africa
12.	2006	"Rockstarz"	Sandra Marschner	Berlin, Germany

== DVDs ==
Year	Title
2004	Traces of Sadness (Live in Estonia)
2005	Best Of: The Video Collection
