= Best Of (Vanilla Ninja album) =

2005 compilation album by Vanilla Ninja

Greatest hits album by Vanilla Ninja
- Released: December 2, 2005
- Recorded: 2003–2005
- Genre: Pop rock, hard rock
- Length: 68:38
- Language: English
- Label: Bros Records
- Producer: David Brandes

Vanilla Ninja chronology
Blue Tattoo (2005)	Best Of (2005)	Love Is War (2006)

Singles from Best Of
- 1. "Megamix" Released: November 25, 2005

Best Of is a best-of album by the Estonian girl band Vanilla Ninja. The album was released in December 2005 and consists of thirteen songs from their Traces of Sadness and Blue Tattoo albums. The album was released in several countries in Central Europe, but did not make the top 100 in Germany or Austria, and peaked at #70 in Switzerland. The album did not make the chart in Estonia either, ending their run of three consecutive #1 albums.

== History ==
The release of Best Of was controversial, as the group had already left Bros Records, and the band were unaware of its release. In interviews during the weeks around the album's release, Vanilla Ninja member Piret Järvis asked fans not to buy the album, as it would be supporting the Bros label.

The album was essentially a greatest hits album of the group's releases since their 2004 international breakthrough, containing tracks recorded between late 2003 and early 2005 with no new material. Most of their singles were included on the album, including "Tough Enough", "When The Indians Cry", "I Know" and their Eurovision Song Contest 2005 song "Cool Vibes".

No tracks from their first album, Vanilla Ninja, were included, as this had been released by TopTen rather than Bros Records. The album was generally criticised by critics, who argued that the band's career was not long enough to warrant a "Best Of" album.

The album cover for Best Of showed the original Vanilla Ninja line-up, with Maarja Kivi pictured instead of Triinu Kivilaan, despite her leaving the group in mid-2004. Kivi was signed to Bros as a solo artist, with an upcoming single, "Could You".

== Track listing ==
1. "Tough Enough" – 3:22
2. "Don't Go Too Fast" – 3:11
3. "When the Indians Cry" – 3:31
4. "Blue Tattoo" – 4:08
5. "Cool Vibes" – 4:05
6. "My Puzzle Of Dreams" – 3:22
7. "Never Gotta Know" – 3:15
8. "Traces of Sadness" – 3:21
9. "Liar" – 3:36
10. "Don't You Realize" – 3:49
11. "I Know" – 3:17
12. "Corner Of My Mind" – 3:37
13. "Destroyed By You" – 3:51
14. "Tough Enough" (Extended version) – 6:24
15. "Blue Tattoo" (Extended version) – 9:20
16. "Megamix" (Extended version) – 6:29

== Chart positions ==
Chart (2005)	Position
Swiss Albums (Schweizer Hitparade)	70
