= Triinu Kivilaan =

Estonian vocalist and former model (born 1989)

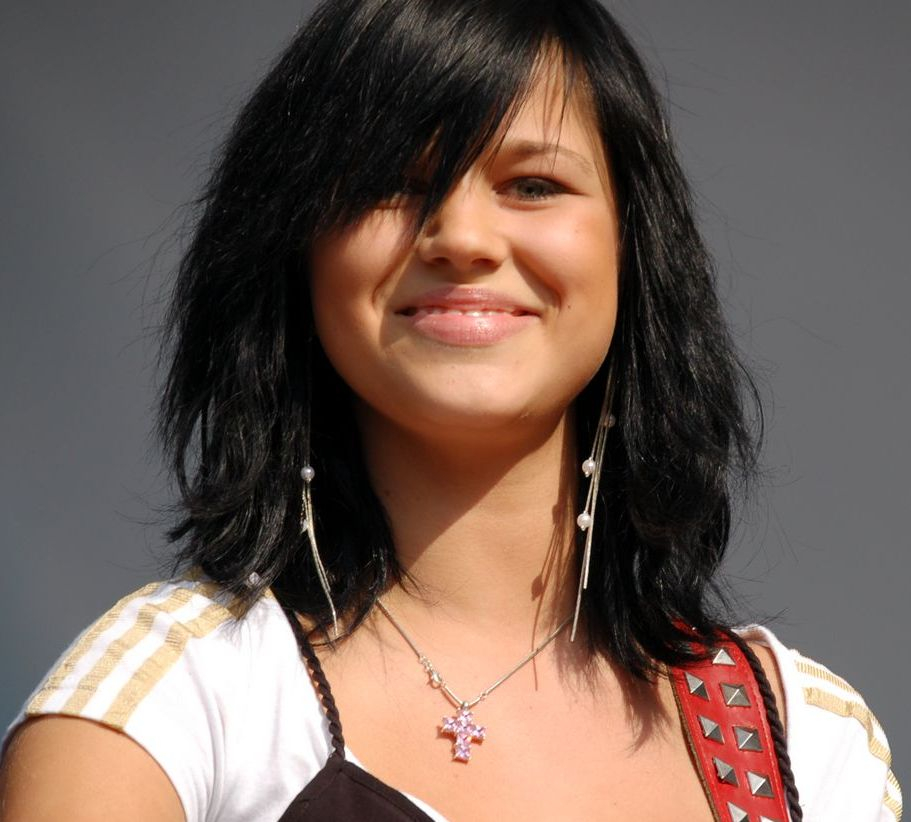
- Triinu Kivilaan in 2005.

Background information
- Born: 13 January 1989 (age 37); Viljandi, then part of Estonian SSR, Soviet Union
- Genres: Pop rock, R&B
- Occupations: Singer, model
- Years active: 2006–present
- Label: Studio 03

Triinu Kivilaan (born 13 January 1989 in Viljandi, Estonia) is an Estonian vocalist and former model, best known as a former member of the popular girl group Vanilla Ninja. She had been modelling for several years when she replaced Maarja Kivi on bass in the group in 2004, having met the other members of the group a year earlier. A key factor, allegedly, in her being selected to join the group was the similarities between her and Kivi's appearance. Kivilaan was (by several years) the youngest member of the group, and continued with her education despite Vanilla Ninja's busy schedule.

When Kivilaan joined the group, Vanilla Ninja had already been chosen to represent Switzerland at the Eurovision Song Contest 2005. Kivilaan's arrival jeopardised Vanilla Ninja's participation in the Contest, as she was only 15 years old, and after the appearance of young participants such as 1986 winner Sandra Kim, the Eurovision had set an age requirement that all participants must be at least 16. Kivilaan initially claimed to be 17 years old, but the Swiss selectors doubted this and discovered her true age. For a while it looked like the group would have to withdraw, but the fact that Kivilaan would reach her 16th birthday four months before the Contest meant that the European Broadcasting Union allowed the girls to compete.

Kivilaan would eventually leave Vanilla Ninja in December 2005, with the other three members (Lenna Kuurmaa, Katrin Siska and Piret Järvis) deciding to continue as a trio. The reasons given by the group when announcing the decision was that Kivilaan had left by "mutual consent", and that creative differences were the main reason for her leaving.

During her time in the group, Triinu only played a bit part in Vanilla Ninja's songs, despite her replacing the group's original lead singer. Kivilaan mostly only provided backing vocals and basic instrumentation during live performances, and was essentially separated from the other three members during their semi-final and final performances at the Eurovision Song Contest 2005. Kivilaan also only appeared sparingly in the group's music videos, with the exception of "When The Indians Cry", in which she featured prominently.

She was living in Switzerland in 2021.

== Discography ==
=== Albums ===
- Blue Tattoo (2005) (as part of Vanilla Ninja)
- Now and Forever (2008)
- Encore (2021) (as part of Vanilla Ninja)

=== Singles ===
- Home (2008)
- Fallen (2008)
- Be With You (2008)
- Is It Me (2009)
