= Vanilla Ninja =

Estonian all-female rock band

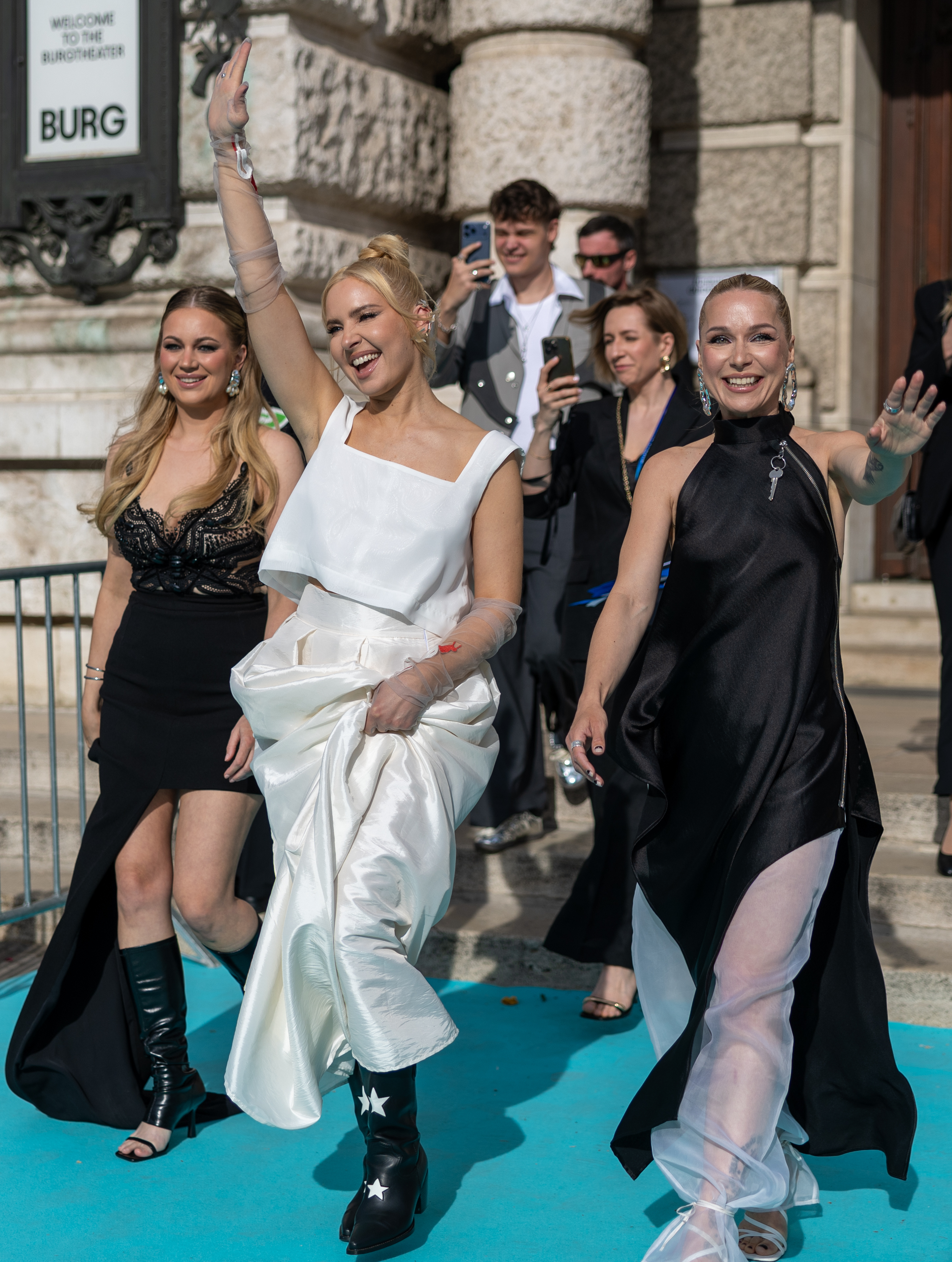
- Vanilla Ninja in 2026

Background information
- Origin: Tallinn, Estonia
- Genres: Pop rock; hard rock
- Years active: 2002–2008; 2020–present
- Labels: TopTen, Bros, EMI, Capitol, Broken Records International, ZYX, Pony Canyon
- Members: Lenna Kuurmaa; Piret Järvis; Kerli Kivilaan
- Past members: Maarja Kivi; Katrin Siska; Triinu Kivilaan
- Website: vanillaninja.ee

Vanilla Ninja is an Estonian all-female rock band from Tallinn, formed in 2002. The group achieved commercial success in Estonia and across Europe, particularly following the release of their second studio album, Traces of Sadness (2004), which reached the top five of the album charts in Germany and Austria and was certified gold in both countries and platinum in Estonia. The album produced several of the group's best-known singles, including "Tough Enough", "Don't Go Too Fast", "Liar", and "When the Indians Cry".

The band's original lineup consisted of Maarja Kivi, Lenna Kuurmaa, Katrin Siska, and Piret Järvis. Their self-titled debut album, Vanilla Ninja (2003) reached number one and was certified platinum in Estonia. Kivi left the group in 2004 and was replaced by Triinu Kivilaan. Following Kivilaan's departure in 2005, the group continued as a trio and released Blue Tattoo (2005) and Love Is War (2006). Blue Tattoo became their highest-charting album in Switzerland and reached the top ten in Estonia, Germany, and Austria.

Vanilla Ninja represented Switzerland in the Eurovision Song Contest 2005 with the song "Cool Vibes", finishing eighth in the final. The group had previously competed in Eurolaul 2003 with "Club Kung-Fu", finishing ninth, and returned to the competition in Eurolaul 2007 with "Birds of Peace", which finished fourth. After a period of inactivity, Vanilla Ninja reunited in 2021 and released their fifth studio album, Encore.

In 2022, Kerli Kivilaan joined the band following the departures of Siska and Triinu Kivilaan. In 2026, the group won Eesti Laul 2026 with the song "Too Epic to Be True" and represented Estonia in the Eurovision Song Contest 2026, where they finished eleventh in the first semi-final. The 2026 lineup consisted of Kuurmaa, Järvis, and Kerli Kivilaan.

== History ==
=== 2002: Formation ===
Vanilla Ninja were formed in 2002 as a four-piece girl band. The original line-up consisted of Maarja Kivi (vocals/bass), Lenna Kuurmaa (vocals/guitar), Katrin Siska (vocals/keyboard) and Piret Järvis (vocals/guitar). Although all of the members were effectively vocalists, the main vocalist would often change between Kivi and Kuurmaa. At the time of formation the group's producer was Sven Lõhmus.

Early in 2002 Kivi had participated in Eurolaul, Estonia's Eurovision pre-selection contest, but had finished 7th. Due to her participation in Eurolaul she was chosen to front the band, which subsequently gained some exposure early on in their existence, despite none of the other members having had any previous national success in their career. Kivi had been friends with Kuurmaa for some time before the formation of the group, whilst Järvis and Siska were friends from school.

=== 2003: Eurolaul and debut album ===
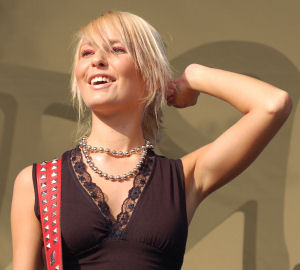
Piret Järvis (2005)

In 2003 the group participated in Estonian ESC preselection Eurolaul 2003. Performing the song "Club Kung Fu" the group proved to be by far the most popular in the phone polls, but unlike other countries, Estonia used a jury to decide the song for Eurovision instead of the televote. The jury, which included figures such as Michael Ball, proved to not share the opinion expressed by the televoters and placed the group joint bottom of the ten entrants. The participation and popularity of the song, however, helped the group and created exposure for the release of their debut album, Vanilla Ninja, released in May 2003. Containing the original version of the song "Club Kung Fu", along with a drum and bass remix and thirteen new pop-rock tracks in English and Estonian, the album proved to be a success in Estonia and launched the band into the national mainstream, pushing the group to seek international success in Germany, Switzerland and Austria.

=== 2003/2004: Expansion into Europe and 2nd album ===
Following a successful debut in Estonia, Vanilla Ninja have launched themselves as a band in three German speaking countries of Europe – Germany, Austria and Switzerland. The band did not release their debut album or "Club Kung Fu" in these countries, instead opting for a new track called "Tough Enough". Proving to again be a pop-rock track, although with less of a 'novelty' style to it, the song was released in Germany on 8 December 2003, and then later in Austria and Switzerland on 4 January and 8 February 2004 respectively. It proved to be a success, gaining large amounts of airplay on the popular VIVA music video channel, and making the top twenty in both Germany and Austria. The single also featured in the dance mat games "Dance Dance Revolution ULTRAMIX 2" and "In The Groove".

Following the success of their debut single the group released "Club Kung Fu" in Germany, and then a third single, "Don't Go Too Fast", in both Germany and Austria on 4 and 5 April (and in Switzerland during March, although it missed the top 100). The latter just missed the top twenty in both countries, and was followed up by their second album Traces of Sadness in June 2004. The album included "Tough Enough" and "Don't Go Too Fast", as well as numerous other tracks, such as "When The Indians Cry" and "Liar". It's along with the album track "Metal Queen" have also both featured in the "DrumMania" series of drumming games.

=== 2004: New band member and Eurovision for Switzerland ===
Despite not having as much chart success in Switzerland as in Austria and Germany, the band had become increasingly popular with the Swiss public. Their chart performance had also been improving, with the Traces Of Sadness album making #14, but despite that no-one would have expected the shock announcement that the group would represent Switzerland in the Eurovision Song Contest 2005. The Swiss selectors had suffered several years of poor results in the Eurovision, culminating in 'null points' for Piero and the MusicStars in the 2004 semi-final, and so looked to the group due to their popularity in both Switzerland and various other European countries. The announcement angered some people, especially Estonians, who felt that the group should represent their home country and not a country that they have minor connections to. In Switzerland some also opposed the selection, again on the basis that none of the group were Swiss. The selectors responded by stating that the song would still have a Swiss component due to it being mostly written by David Brandes. Ironically, although Brandes was born in Switzerland and went to school there, he is essentially German.

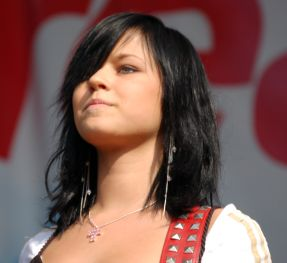
Triinu Kivilaan (2005)

Their selection and participation in the contest was put into jeopardy soon after the announcement, though, after Maarja Kivi left the group due to becoming pregnant with her first child. Her replacement was Triinu Kivilaan, who at the time was only 15 years old. Their participation was put into doubt due to regulations stating that competitors must be at least 16 years old, a rule introduced to eliminate participants such as the 13-year-old 1986 Eurovision winner Sandra Kim. Kivilaan had in fact initially claimed to be 17 years old, but the Swiss selectors doubted this and eventually found out her true birth date was 13 January 1989.

It began to look as if Vanilla Ninja would not represent Switzerland in 2005, but the Swiss selectors decided not to reverse the selection, on the basis that Kivilaan would turn 16 before the contest. There was no danger of the EBU blocking their participation, because their own age rule specified a cut-off date of the contest itself, whereas national selectors could tweak their age regulations to their own liking. This annoyed some, who felt that the selectors had acted in a heavy-handed manner by selecting Vanilla Ninja.

Following the Eurovision selection the group went on to continue their success in Europe, releasing the single "Liar". The single scraped into the top twenty in Germany and Austria, but performed disappointingly in Switzerland (reaching only #43 despite the announcement regarding Eurovision 2005). The following single, however, would prove to be their biggest hit to date and would launch them into the German top ten for the first time.

"When The Indians Cry", their fifth Central European single, would be the group's first slow, soft, ballad-like song. The music video would also be the first to feature Triinu Kivilaan, with previous videos featuring Maarja Kivi. Kivilaan proved to fit into the group well, looking older than her age of 15 and silencing critics who believed she would be out of place in a band with girls all three or more years older than her. Incidentally, one of the reasons that Kivilaan was chosen to replace Kivi was due to their similar appearance, making it easy to mix the two up. The song would be Vanilla Ninja's first ballad, featuring a slow tempo, unlike most previous songs which had been fairly upbeat. It proved to be a hit, reaching #8 in the German charts in September 2004, #7 in the Austrian charts and #27 in the Swiss charts (which had not reacted as expected to their selection for Eurovision).

With the song putting them into the German chart mainstream, and gaining huge airplay on the music video channel VIVA, Vanilla Ninja would begin to become one of the biggest acts in Germany. The follow-up to "When The Indians Cry", a new track called "Blue Tattoo" and in a similar style to their previous release, would also reach the German top ten whilst making the Austrian top twenty and Swiss top thirty.

=== 2005: 3rd album and Eurovision ===
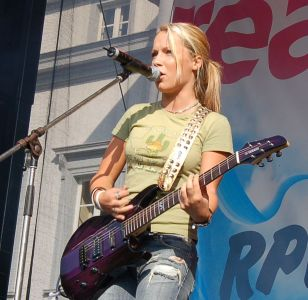
Lenna Kuurmaa singing "Cool Vibes".

Following the success of the "Blue Tattoo" single in November and December 2004, the group would take a three-month break from releasing material in order to tour Asia. In 2004 the group had reportedly set an ambitious target of "conquering the world", and the tour proved to be successful in helping them to begin to do that, winning new fans in countries such as Japan, China, Malaysia and Thailand. The group also played a key role in VIVA's 2004 "Your Stars For Christmas" show, singing a re-worded version of "When The Indians Cry" called "Light Of Hope".

In May 2005 the group returned to the charts, releasing a new song called "I Know", which featured a mildly controversial video based around domestic abuse. The song was again successful, peaking at #13 in Germany and #17 in Austria. Two weeks after its release their third album, Blue Tattoo, was released in various European countries and proved to be as successful as the previous album, charting at #4 in Germany and, unsurprisingly (as it included the Eurovision song "Cool Vibes"), Switzerland.

During their hiatus in order to tour Asia the Swiss Eurovision song had been completed and had been announced as being called "Cool Vibes". A short song, in order to comply with Eurovision regulations, the track received mixed response. Many saw it to be a good pop-rock song, but many believed it was not the girls' best, and that it was not the type of song suitable for Eurovision.

The song failed to get off to a good start, though, as the song was banned from the German charts after writer and producer David Brandes was accused of manipulating the charts by buying thousands of copies of his artist's singles. Among the songs he had allegedly bought many copies of were the groups "When The Indians Cry" single, and the German Eurovision entry "Run and Hide" by Gracia. Soon after Gracia was fired by her record company, and the two artists (along with "Virus Incorporation") were banned from the charts for initially three weeks. The girls came out unaffected, although it would be a blow for the songwriter and may have meant the high position of "When The Indians Cry" was helped by the mass-buying of singles by Brandes.

Due to Switzerland getting no points in the semi-final of the 2004 contest, Vanilla Ninja had to compete in the Eurovision semi-final on 19 May 2005. Against artists such as Wig Wam, Luminita Anghel and Zdob şi Zdub the competition was difficult, but the group progressed to the final and were given good odds of 10/1 for winning the contest. The group's performance in the final on 21 May was, according to some, not as good as it could have been, although those criticising the performance also criticised the song (believing a song similar to "When The Indians Cry" or even "Club Kung Fu" would have been better).

In the voting, however, the group did well in the early stages. Despite not representing their native Estonia, their home country responded well and gave the group the full 12 points (Estonia's entry, Suntribe's "Let's Get Loud", had been eliminated in the semi-final). Latvia also gave the group 12 points, whilst Germany rather surprisingly only gave them four. Austrian voters were even less impressed by the performance, not giving any points to the group at all.

Despite leading at the one-third stage, Vanilla Ninja eventually slipped down the leader board and finished 8th. The result allowed Switzerland to achieve their best result for years and automatic qualification for next year's final, but for the group it was a disappointment considering their popularity and good odds for winning the contest.

=== Post-Eurovision, split from Brandes and fourth/fifth album ===
On 12 June 2005 the group released "Cool Vibes" in Switzerland, the single charting at number 17. Despite failing to make the top ten, a surprise as the girls represented Switzerland, the release became their best-placed Swiss single release yet. The single was not released in Germany initially, possibly due to the April 2005 allegations that David Brandes manipulated the chart placing of several of his songs, including "When The Indians Cry" by Vanilla Ninja, which resulted in a short ban from the charts for the group. However, on 2 July, the single charted in Germany at the comparatively poor position of #42, and in Austria at #70.

In a May 2005 interview with The Baltic Times, the group attempted to distance themselves from the pop music genre. Piret Järvis told the newspaper that the group "started out with a pop-rock style of music". The band also claimed that their music is gradually become heavier and more typical of the rock genre.

Following the arguably disappointing performance of the "Cool Vibes" single, the group stopped releasing singles from their Blue Tattoo album, instead concentrating on touring commitments. By the second half of 2005 it would become clear that the group was starting to have problems with their record label, Bros Music, and their manager David Brandes. Since moving from the TopTen label the group had suffered from problems such as the scandal of Brandes buying their singles in bulk to boost chart positions, with the label also suffering problems (such as being 'booted out' of the Sony BMG Music Entertainment group). The problems escalated toward the end of 2005 when the girls parted company with Bros Music and Brandes, moving to the EMI-owned Capitol Music label. According to press releases from the group's new management, their relationship with Bros Music and Brandes is now "hostile", and any future affiliation with their former manager is therefore unlikely. Brandes himself has claimed that their career "is over", and that their new management company are "amateurs".

After leaving Bros Music, the group began work on what was intended to be their fourth album. Bros Music, however, released a ninth single, "Megamix", in December 2005, along with a "greatest hits" album Best Of. According to the girls, they were not consulted about the release of the single or the album, with Järvis asking fans to not buy either release. This, along with the lack of promotion on Bros part, made both the single and album a flop (the single only made the lower reaches of the Swiss and German charts, failing to make the Austrian Top 100 at all, with the album making #70 in Switzerland and failing to chart elsewhere). The band's not knowing about the releases was further backed up by 2004 promotional photos being used for the CD covers, with Maarja Kivi appearing, despite leaving the group over a year beforehand. Kivi's appearance has also been claimed by some to be clever promotion on the part of Brandes, as Kivi is now signed to Bros as a solo artist.

Shortly after the failure of their uncommissioned single and album releases, the group announced that Triinu Kivilaan was leaving the group, with Kuurmaa, Siska and Järvis continuing as a trio. According to the remaining members of Vanilla Ninja, Kivilaan left because of the stress of being in the group, and to concentrate on her studies. Some have still, however, suggested that her leaving may have simply been down to a lack of vocal talent, or due to a rift with the other members. Despite rumours suggesting Kivi might be rejoining the group, it seems that the group will not be adding a fourth member again.

The group released their first original single for almost a year in April 2006, with "Dangerzone" seeing the girls retain their pop-rock sound from previous albums. The single charted on 7 May 2006 in Switzerland, peaking at #18, with the release in Germany placing one position higher. The Austrian release would also make #23, suggesting that the group is likely to continue the success that Traces of Sadness and Blue Tattoo had in Central Europe. Meanwhile, the girl's fifth album Love is War is expected to be released in the near future.

The group is extremely popular in their native Estonia, with the girls seen as a-list celebrities in the Baltic countries. The three members are also seen as something of sex symbols in their homeland, with a 2006 poll by the Estonian magazine Kroonika voting Piret Järvis the country's most attractive female. The top five of the poll also featured Siska (2nd) and Kuurmaa (4th). Kivilaan was not included, despite being a former model.

=== Eurolaul 2007 ===
Vanilla Ninja participated in Eurolaul 2007, the Estonian preselection for the Eurovision Song Contest 2007, with the song "Birds of Peace". Their song placed 4th.

=== Viña del Mar Festival 2008 ===
Broken Records International S.A. founder, Héctor Faune, tried to contact Vanilla Ninja with no success, until two Polish fans (Tomek & Yo – Tomek), from the site love-ninjas gave to Faune Lenna's direct contact, so he could propose to the band the idea to participate in the Viña del Mar International Song Festival 2008, representing their native Estonia.

This festival is the most important of this category in Latin America, girls participated with their power ballad "Birds of Peace", and they won the "Silver Seagull" which is the maximum trophy of the Festival and ten thousand dollars as the Best Performers / Interpreters of the festival contest.

=== Vanilla Ninja recording a Per Gessle song ===
Vanilla Ninja's 2008 single "Crashing Through the Doors" was written by Per Gessle from Roxette with lyrics by Piret and Lenna. Broken Records International put the Vanilla Ninja girls in contact with Per Gessle himself, who was glad to cooperate. The song peaked at #2 in Estonian charts.

=== Eurovision 2026 ===
The band represented Estonia in the Eurovision Song Contest 2026 after their victory in Estonia's national final Eesti Laul. They performed in the second half of the First Semi-Final on 12 May 2026, but did not qualify for the final, missing qualification by a tiny margin and finishing 11th.

== Recent period ==
On 27 November 2020, after not releasing an album for almost 14 years, Katrin Siska posted on her facebook page that they will be releasing a new album in 2021, with Triinu re-joining the group. That album has been released and is called 'Encore'.

In March 2022, Kerli Kivilaan, younger sister of Triinu Kivilaan, joined the group.

== Music videos ==
Vanilla Ninja have made music videos for all of the singles they have released, although some have proved to be more popular than others. The first music video to feature Triinu Kivilaan was "When The Indians Cry", with previous videos featuring the now departed Maarja Kivi. "When The Indians Cry", along with "Tough Enough" and "Blue Tattoo" have been the most successful of Vanilla Ninja's videos, in terms of airplay, to date. The video for "Cool Vibes" is the most recent of their videos to gain airplay, featuring regularly on Central European Video Channels throughout June and July 2005.

All of the girls' videos have been extremely popular on German video channels, gaining airplay mainly on the popular music channel VIVA. The feat of airplay on VIVA is even more impressive because, from late 2003 until late 2005, the girls were signed to Bros Records, distributed by Sony BMG Music, when the station has been exposed as being biased for the airplay of artists signed to rival record company Universal.

Vanilla Ninja received a considerable amount of bad publicity for their "Cool Vibes" video, which seemingly stole material from Deine Lakaien's video for their single "Mindmachine". There is currently no proof that the band members of Vanilla Ninja knew about the alleged stolen material. That is because the video was produced in a phase of separation from David Brandes and he alone did the production for the video.

== Discography ==
Studio albums

- Vanilla Ninja (2003)
- Traces of Sadness (2004)
- Blue Tattoo (2005)
- Love Is War (2006)
- Encore (2021)

== Awards and nominations ==
Year	Nominee / work	Award	Result
2006	Vanilla Ninja	Best Baltic Act at MTV European Music Awards	Nominated

== Band members ==
Current lineup

- Lenna Kuurmaa – lead vocals, guitar (2002–2009; 2019–present)
- Piret Järvis – lead guitar, backing vocals (2002–2009; 2019–present)
- Kerli Kivilaan – bass guitar, backing vocals (2022-present)

Former

- Maarja Kivi – vocals, bass guitar (2002–2004)
- Katrin Siska – keyboards, synthesizers, backing vocals (2002–2009; 2019–2022)
- Triinu Kivilaan – bass guitar, backing vocals (2004–2005, 2020–2022)

=== Timeline ===
Awards and achievements
Preceded by Piero and the MusicStars with "Celebrate"	Switzerland in the Eurovision Song Contest; 2005	Succeeded by six4one with "If We All Give a Little"
Preceded by Tommy Cash with "Espresso Macchiato"	Estonia in the Eurovision Song Contest; 2026	Succeeded by TBD
