= Love Is War (album) =

2006 album by Vanilla Ninja

Studio album by Vanilla Ninja
- Released: (Germany) May 19, 2006 (Japan) May 31, 2006 (Poland) June 26, 2006 (Brazil) October 7, 2009
- Recorded: 2005–2006; Tindeltown Music Studios, Germany
- Genre: Alternative rock
- Length: 42:19
- Language: English
- Label: EMI/Capitol Records
- Producer: Kiko Masbaum, Kent Larsson

Vanilla Ninja chronology
Best Of (2005)	Love Is War (2006)	Encore (2021)

Professional ratings
Review scores
Source	Rating
Metal Maiden	(8/10) link
Stylus	B+ 2006-06-27
Melodic.net	link

Love is War is Vanilla Ninja's fourth studio album, released by EMI Music Germany in May 2006. This is the first album by the girls as a three-piece band. Recording took about six months. Most of the songs are co-written by the band members - Lenna and Piret - making this album the most personal for girls. For example, the song "Kingdom Burning Down" tells a story of their fight with their ex-producer and as they say, "Every song is dedicated to someone and they have important meaning for us." The first single from this album was "Dangerzone", which was fairly successful in Germany and Poland. Vanilla Ninja performed this song at the Sopot International Song Festival in Poland. Later, the single "Rockstarz" was released. However, due to many release date changes caused by EMI, the single did not chart well and the band was dropped from the label.

== Track listing ==
#	Title	Words	Time
1	"Kingdom Burning Down"	Piret Järvis, Lenna Kuurmaa, Michelle Leonard	3:59
2	"Dangerzone (Long version)"	Martin Fly, Lenna Kuurmaa, Michelle Leonard, Flo Peil	3:17
3	"The Band That Never Existed"	Lenna Kuurmaa, Michelle Leonard	3:15
4	"Rockstarz"	Per Henrik Aldeheim, Michelle Leonard, Christian Neander	3:26
5	"Shadows on the Moon"	Martin Fly, Piret Järvis, Flo Peil	3:05
6	"Black Symphony"	Piret Järvis, Kent Larsson, Jeff Lebowski, Michelle Leonard, Claudio Pagonis	3:46
7	"Pray"	Martin Fly, Lenna Kuurmaa, Claudio Pagonis	4:34
8	"Battlefield"	Jeff Lebowski, Claudio Pagonis	3:08
9	"Spirit of the Dawn"	Martin Fly, Claudio Pagonis	3:52
10	"Insane in Vain"	Martin Fly, Bassel El Hallak, Michelle Leonard	3:17
11	"Bad Girls"	Martin Fly, Piret Järvis	3:14
12	"Silence"	Lenna Kuurmaa, Michelle Leonard	4:31
13	"Love Is Just a War" (Brazil & Japan bonus track)	Lenna Kuurmaa, Kiko Masbaum, Michelle Leonard, Harry Hess	3:26
14	"My Name" (Brazil & Japan bonus track)	Lenna Kuurmaa, Kiko Masbaum, Michelle Leonard, Christian Neander	3:11

=== B-sides ===
- "Falling Star" (Found on "Dangerzone" single)

== Singles ==
1. "Dangerzone" (2006)
2. "Rockstarz" (2006)
3. "Insane in Vain" (Estonian radio only) (2007)

== Music videos ==
1. "Dangerzone" (2006)
2. "Rockstarz" (2006)

== Charts ==
Chart (2006)	Peak position
Austrian Albums Chart	29
Estonian Albums Chart	1
Germany Top 100	16
Polish OLiS Top 50 Albums	48
Swiss Albums Chart	14
