= Shine It On =

"Shine it on"

Single by Maarja Kivi
- Released: 1 September 2006
- Genre: Rock
- Label: Icezone Music
- Songwriter: Clyde Ward
- Producer: David Brandes

"Shine It On" is the second single of Estonian musician Maarja Kivi. "Shine It On" was released on 1 September 2006. The single was a bigger hit than her first single "Could You", and reached number #16 at MTV Baltic TOP 20. In Estonia, the single peaked at #9 in the singles' chart.

== Track listing ==
1. "Radio Edit" 3:30
2. "Unplugged Version" 3:30
3. "Extended Version" 5:07
4. "Classical Version" 3:28
5. "Video" 3:29

== Charts ==
- #9 Estonia
- #48, Germany
- #43, Austria
- #16, MTV Baltic TOP 20
