= Piret Järvis =

Estonian musician

Piret Järvis-Milder
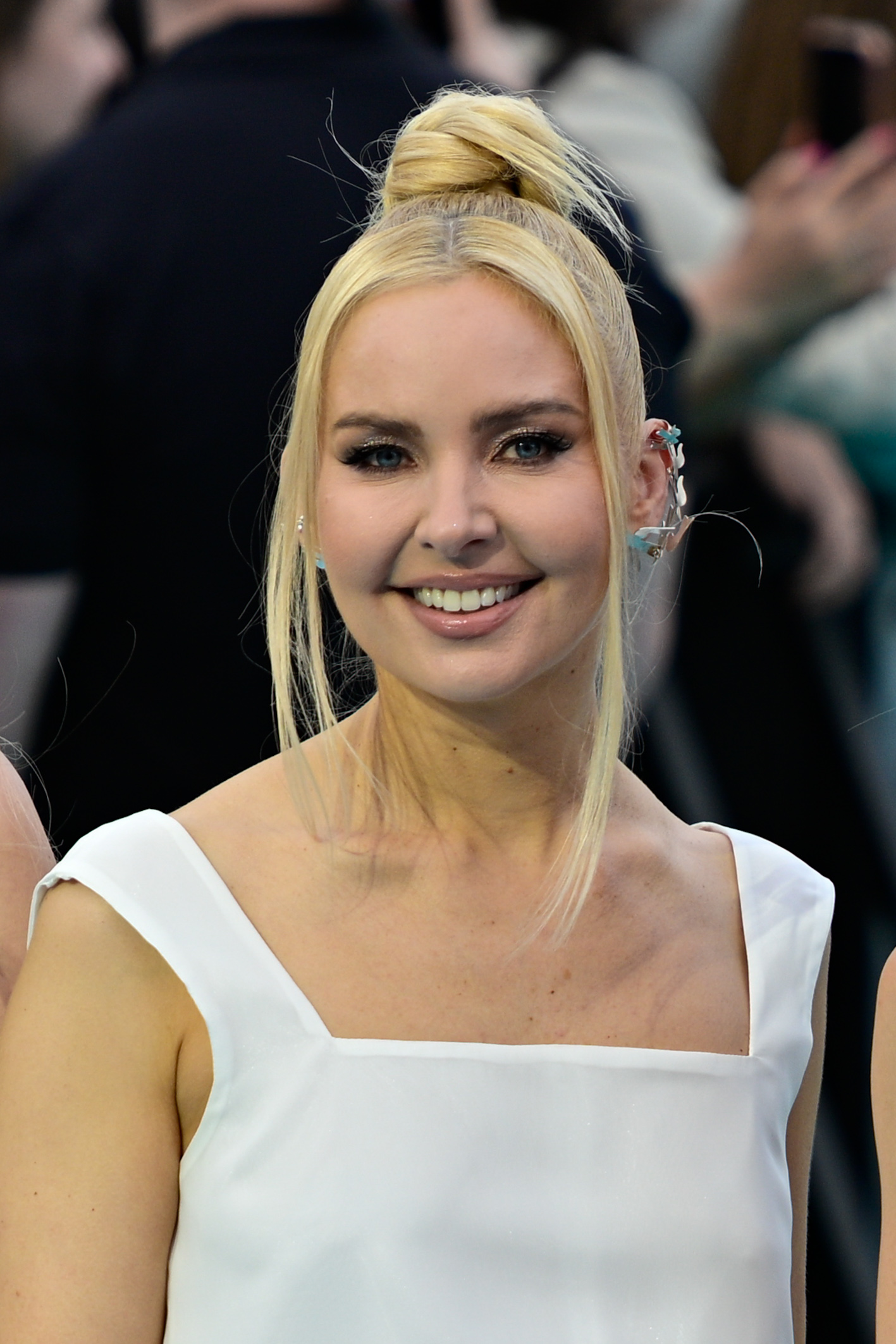
- Järvis in 2026

Background information
- Born: 6 February 1984 (age 42); Tallinn, then part of Estonian SSR, Soviet Union
- Origin: Estonia
- Genres: Pop; rock
- Occupations: TV host; singer-songwriter
- Instruments: Vocals; electric guitar
- Years active: 2002–present
- Member of: Vanilla Ninja

Piret Järvis-Milder (born 6 February 1984) is an Estonian television host and singer, guitarist, and songwriter of the popular rock band Vanilla Ninja.

== Early life and education ==
Born to Maire and Enno Järvis she has an older sister and a younger brother. After graduating high school she entered International University of Concordia where she was majoring in Media and Public Relations. Later she continued to study journalism at the University of Tartu.

== Career ==
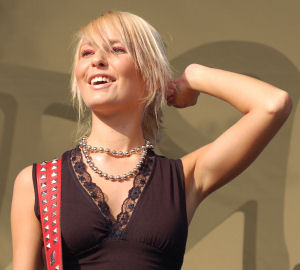
Piret Järvis at Koblenz festival, 2005

She was one of the four members to form Vanilla Ninja in 2002 and wrote lyrics for the song "Club Kung Fu" that made Vanilla Ninja well known in Estonia. She continued as a lyricist for many of the band's songs like "Birds Of Peace", "I Don't Care at All", "Black Symphony" etc. Although she initially played a more 'background' role in the group, she featured heavily on their 2005 album Blue Tattoo due to Maarja Kivi (the former lead singer) leaving in 2004. Järvis often acted as the spokesperson for the group in interviews, and on numerous occasions has been dubbed as the best looking and most stylish member. In 2005 she was voted Estonia's sexiest woman of the year by the readers of Estonia's best-selling gossip magazine Kroonika.

Järvis gave out the Estonian votes in Eurovision 2011, which mathematically confirmed Azerbaijan's first victory in the competition.

She has worked for different Estonian TV channels since 2002, including TV3, MTV Eesti, MTV Baltics, and is currently a host and a journalist at the Eesti Rahvusringhääling. She has hosted shows such as Pealtnägija, Eesti Laul, Jõulutunnel, and Terevisioon.

== Personal life ==
In August 2017, Järvis married Estonian musician Egert Milder in Georgia. The couple have two children: a daughter born in 2020 and a son born in 2023.
