= Tough Enough (song) =

Single by Vanilla Ninja

from the album Traces of Sadness
- A-side: "Tough Enough"
- Released: November 24, 2003
- Recorded: 2003
- Genre: Pop rock, Eurotrance, Eurodance, electropop, dance-rock, dance-pop, alternative rock, adult contemporary
- Length: 3:24
- Label: Bros Music
- Songwriters: David Brandes, Jane Tempest (Petra Brändle), John O'Flynn
- Producer: David Brandes

Vanilla Ninja singles chronology
| "Tough Enough" (2003) | "Club Kung Fu" (2004) |

"Tough Enough" is the debut single of the Estonian girl band Vanilla Ninja. The music was composed by David Brandes and Petra Brändle (under the pseudonym Jane Tempest), with lyrics by Bernd Meinunger (as John O'Flynn).

"Tough Enough" was released on November 24, 2003, and entered the charts, reaching number 11 in Finland, 13 in Germany, 16 in Austria and 52 in Switzerland. The song features on the albums Traces of Sadness, Limited Edition and Best Of. The video, by Mathias Vielsäcker and Christoph Mangler, was shot in November 2003.

The song appeared in the 2004 video games Dancing Stage Fusion, Dance Dance Revolution Ultramix 2 and In the Groove.

== Charts ==
| Chart (2004) | Peak position |
|---|---|
| Austrian Singles Chart | 16 |
| Finnish Singles Charts | 11 |
| German Singles Chart | 13 |
| Swiss Singles Chart | 52 |

== Track listing ==
1. "Tough Enough" (Single version) – 3:24
2. "Tough Enough" (Ambient mix) – 3:24
3. "Tough Enough" (Extended version) – 6:24
4. "Tough Enough" (Unplugged version) – 3:24
5. "Tough Enough" (Musicvideo) – 3:24
