= Switzerland in the Eurovision Song Contest 2004 =

- Eurovision Song Contest 2004
- Participating broadcaster: Swiss Broadcasting Corporation (SRG SSR)
- Country: Switzerland
- Selection process: Eurosong 2004
- Selection date: 6 March 2004

Competing entry
- Song: "Celebrate"
- Artist: Piero Esteriore and the MusicStars
- Songwriters: Greg Manning

Placement
- Semi-final result: Failed to qualify (22nd, 0 points)

Participation chronology

Switzerland was represented at the Eurovision Song Contest 2004 with the song "Celebrate", written by Greg Manning, and performed by Piero Esteriore and the MusicStars. The Swiss participating broadcaster, the Swiss Broadcasting Corporation (SRG SSR), selected its entry through the national final Eurosong 2004. The broadcaster returned to the contest after a one-year absence following its relegation from 2003 as one of the bottom five entrants in 2002. The Swiss-German/Romansh broadcaster Schweizer Fernsehen der deutschen und rätoromanischen Schweiz (SF DRS), the Swiss-French broadcaster Télévision Suisse Romande (TSR), and the Swiss-Italian broadcaster Televisione svizzera di lingua italiana (TSI) each conducted varying selections and a total of twelve entries were selected to advance to the televised national final—four artists and songs from each selection. The twelve finalists performed during the national final on 6 March 2004 where two rounds of regional televoting ultimately selected "Celebrate" performed by Piero Esteriore and the MusicStars as the winner.

Switzerland competed in the semi-final of the Eurovision Song Contest which took place on 12 May 2004. Performing during the show in position 3, "Celebrate" was not announced among the top 10 entries of the semi-final and therefore did not qualify to compete in the final. It was later revealed that Switzerland placed twenty-second (last) out of the 22 participating countries in the semi-final and failed to score any points. This marked the fourth time the nation had received nul points in the history of the competition.

== Background ==
Prior to the 2004 contest, the Swiss Broadcasting Corporation (SRG SSR) had participated in the Eurovision Song Contest representing Switzerland forty-four times since its first entry in 1956. It won that first edition of the contest with the song "Refrain" performed by Lys Assia. Its second victory was achieved in 1988 with the song "Ne partez pas sans moi" performed by Canadian singer Céline Dion. In 2002, "Dans le jardin de mon âme" performed by Francine Jordi placed 22nd earning 15 points.

As part of its duties as participating broadcaster, SRG SSR organises the selection of its entry in the Eurovision Song Contest and broadcasts the event in the country. The broadcaster confirmed their intentions to participate at the 2004 contest on 10 July 2003. Along with its participation confirmation, SRG SSR also announced that it would select its entry for the 2004 contest through a national final. The broadcaster has selected its entry for the contest through both national finals and internal selections in the past. Since 1998, it has opted to organize a national final in order to select the entry.

== Before Eurovision ==
=== Eurosong 2004 ===
Eurosong 2004 was the national final organised by SRG SSR to select its entry for the Eurovision Song Contest 2004. The national final featured entries from the three SRG SSR broadcasters: the Swiss-German/Romansh broadcaster Schweizer Fernsehen der deutschen und rätoromanischen Schweiz (SF DRS), the Swiss-French broadcaster Télévision Suisse Romande (TSR), and the Swiss-Italian broadcaster Televisione svizzera di lingua italiana (TSI). TSR staged the show on 6 March 2004 at its Studio 4 in Geneva, hosted by Jean-Marc Richard and was televised on SF 2 with German commentary by Sandra Studer, TSI 2 with Italian commentary by Roberta Foglia and TSR 1.

==== Selection process ====
The selection process took place in two stages before the finalists for the live show and ultimately the winner are selected. The first stage of the competition included SF DRS, TSR, and TSI each conducting varying selections in order to determine the candidates they submitted for the second stage of the competition. Each broadcaster submitted four candidates to proceed to the second stage, the televised national final, where the winning artist and song was selected to represent Switzerland in Istanbul.

- The SF DRS selection involved a collaboration with record label Universal Music and the casting show MusicStar. 27 songs were submitted by Universal Music and music producers of MusicStar and an expert jury selected the top eight songs. The top four contestants of the first season of MusicStar each selected one of the eight songs as the SF DRS candidates for the national final.
- The TSR selection involved interested artists submitting their entries to the broadcaster. At the close of the deadline, 53 entries were received and 26 of the entries were shortlisted. A jury panel evaluated the shortlisted entries and selected the four TSR candidates for the national final.
- TSI received 78 entry submissions following a submission period. 35 songs were shortlisted and evaluated by a jury panel on 27 February 2004 which selected the four TSI candidates for the national final.

Competing entries
Broadcaster	Artist	Song	Songwriter(s)
RTSI	A-Live	"You Are Pretty"	Peter Zehnder
RTSI	Antonella Lafortezza	"Dove nascono gli amori"	Claudio Lazzarino, Antonio Lovecchio
RTSI	Irina	"Heb ab"	Irene Zwahlen, Jürg Walter
RTSI	Mauro Sabbioni	"Sicuramente uomini"	Mauro Sabbioni
SF DRS	Carmen Fenk	"Something New"	Signorino TJ
SF DRS	Daniela Brun	"The Ghost of You"	David Holler, Urs Wiesendanger
SF DRS	Mario Pacchioli	"By Your Side"	Mario Pacchioli, Ricardo Sanz
SF DRS	Piero Esteriore and the MusicStars	"Celebrate"	Greg Manning
TSR	Caroline Agostinio	"Le monde danse"	Runge Soren
TSR	Fanny	"L'île de lumière"	Daniel Beaux, Benoït Kaufmann
TSR	Lorenzo Marra	"Je rêve d'un monde"	Lorenzo Marra, Laurent Rima, Frederic Vonlanthen
TSR	Tiffen	"Fly Away"	Eddy Vuille, Anne Erard, Laurence Guillod

==== Final ====
The final took place on 6 March 2004. The twelve candidate songs in contention to represent Switzerland were performed and two rounds of regional televoting selected the winner. In the first round, the top six entries were selected to advance to the second round. The second round results were combined with the results of the first round which resulted in the selection of "Celebrate" performed by Piero Esteriore and the MusicStars as the winner. A total of 631,000 votes were registered over both rounds. In addition to the performances from the competing artists, the band Core22 and British singer Jamelia performed as the interval acts.

First Round – 6 March 2004
R/O	Artist	Song	Points	Place
1	Tiffen	"Fly Away"	17	7
2	Mauro Sabbioni	"Sicuramente uomini"	16	9
3	Carmen Fenk	"Something New"	23	5
4	Lorenzo Marra	"Je rêve d'un monde"	14	10
5	Daniela Brun	"The Ghost of You"	17	7
6	Fanny	"L'île de lumière"	13	11
7	Mario Pacchioli	"By Your Side"	26	2
8	Irina	"Heb ab"	10	12
9	A-Live	"You Are Pretty"	26	2
10	Antonella Lafortezza	"Dove nascono gli amori"	21	6
11	Caroline Agostinio	"Le monde danse"	24	4
12	Piero Esteriore and the MusicStars	"Celebrate"	27	1

Second Round – 6 March 2004
R/O	Artist	Song	First Round	Second Round				Total	Place
R/O	Artist	Song	First Round	DRS	TSR	TSI	Total	Total	Place
1	Carmen Fenk	"Something New"	23	2	—N/a	—N/a	3	26	5
2	Mario Pacchioli	"By Your Side"	26	5	2	3	10	36	2
3	A-Live	"You Are Pretty"	26	—N/a	—N/a	—N/a	1	27	4
4	Antonella Lafortezza	"Dove nascono gli amori"	21	—N/a	—N/a	2	3	24	6
5	Caroline Agostinio	"Le monde danse"	24	—N/a	5	—N/a	5	29	3
6	Piero Esteriore and the MusicStars	"Celebrate"	27	3	3	5	11	38	1

== At Eurovision ==
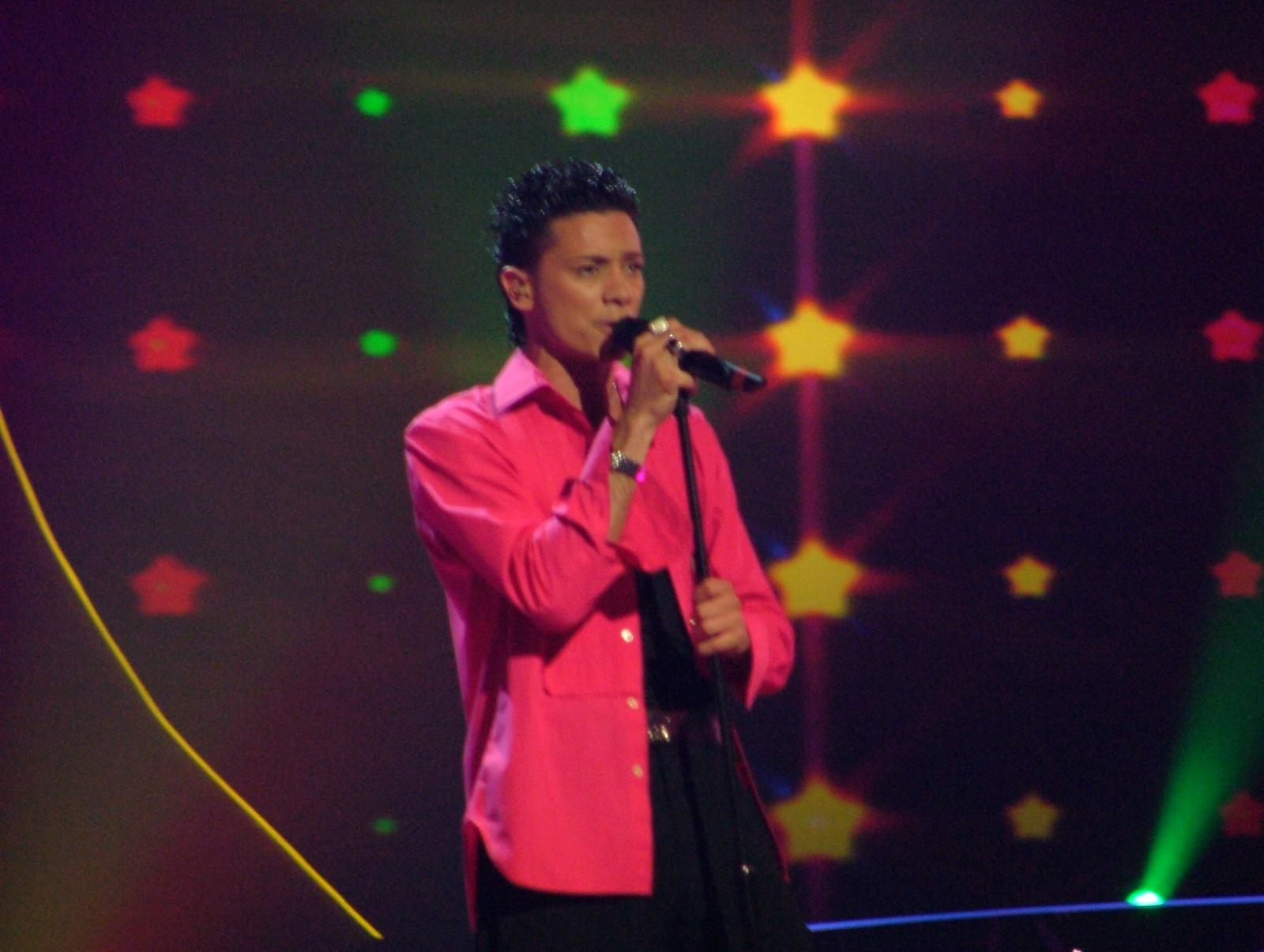
Piero Esteriore during a rehearsal before the semi-final

It was announced that the competition's format would be expanded to include a semi-final in 2004. According to the rules, all nations with the exceptions of the host country, the "Big Four" (France, Germany, Spain, and the United Kingdom), and the ten highest placed finishers in the 2003 contest are required to qualify from the semi-final on 12 May 2004 in order to compete for the final on 15 May 2004; the top ten countries from the semi-final progress to the final. On 23 March 2004, an allocation draw was held which determined the running order for the semi-final and Switzerland was set to perform in position 3, following the entry from Belarus and before the entry from Latvia. At the end of the semi-final, Switzerland was not announced among the top 10 entries in the semi-final and therefore failed to qualify to compete in the final. It was later revealed that Switzerland placed twenty-second (last) in the semi-final, failing to score any points. This marked the fourth time Switzerland received nul points, the previous occasions being in 1964, in 1967, and in 1998.

In Switzerland, three broadcasters that form SRG SSR aired both shows of the contest. Marco Fritsche provided German commentary on SF DRS, Jean-Marc Richard and Marie-Thérèse Porche provided French commentary on TSR, while Daniela Tami and Claudio Lazzarino provided Italian commentary on TSI. SRG SSR appointed Emel Aykanat as its spokesperson to announce the results of the Swiss televote during the final.

=== Voting ===
Below is a breakdown of points awarded to Switzerland and awarded by Switzerland in the semi-final and grand final of the contest. The nation awarded its 12 points to Serbia and Montenegro in the semi-final and the final of the contest. Following the release of the televoting figures by the EBU after the conclusion of the competition, it was revealed that a total of 595,932 televotes were cast in Switzerland during the two shows: 92,305 votes during the semi-final and 503,627 votes during the final.

==== Points awarded to Switzerland ====
Switzerland did not receive any points at the Eurovision Song Contest 2004 semi-final.

==== Points awarded by Switzerland ====
Points awarded by Switzerland (Semi-final)
Score	Country
12 points	Serbia and Montenegro
10 points	Albania
8 points	Bosnia and Herzegovina
7 points	Portugal
6 points	Croatia
5 points	Macedonia
4 points	Netherlands
3 points	Greece
2 points	Ukraine
1 point	Cyprus

Points awarded by Switzerland (Final)
Score	Country
12 points	Serbia and Montenegro
10 points	Germany
8 points	Turkey
7 points	Albania
6 points	Spain
5 points	Bosnia and Herzegovina
4 points	Greece
3 points	Croatia
2 points	Cyprus
1 point	Macedonia
