= Piero Esteriore =

Swiss singer

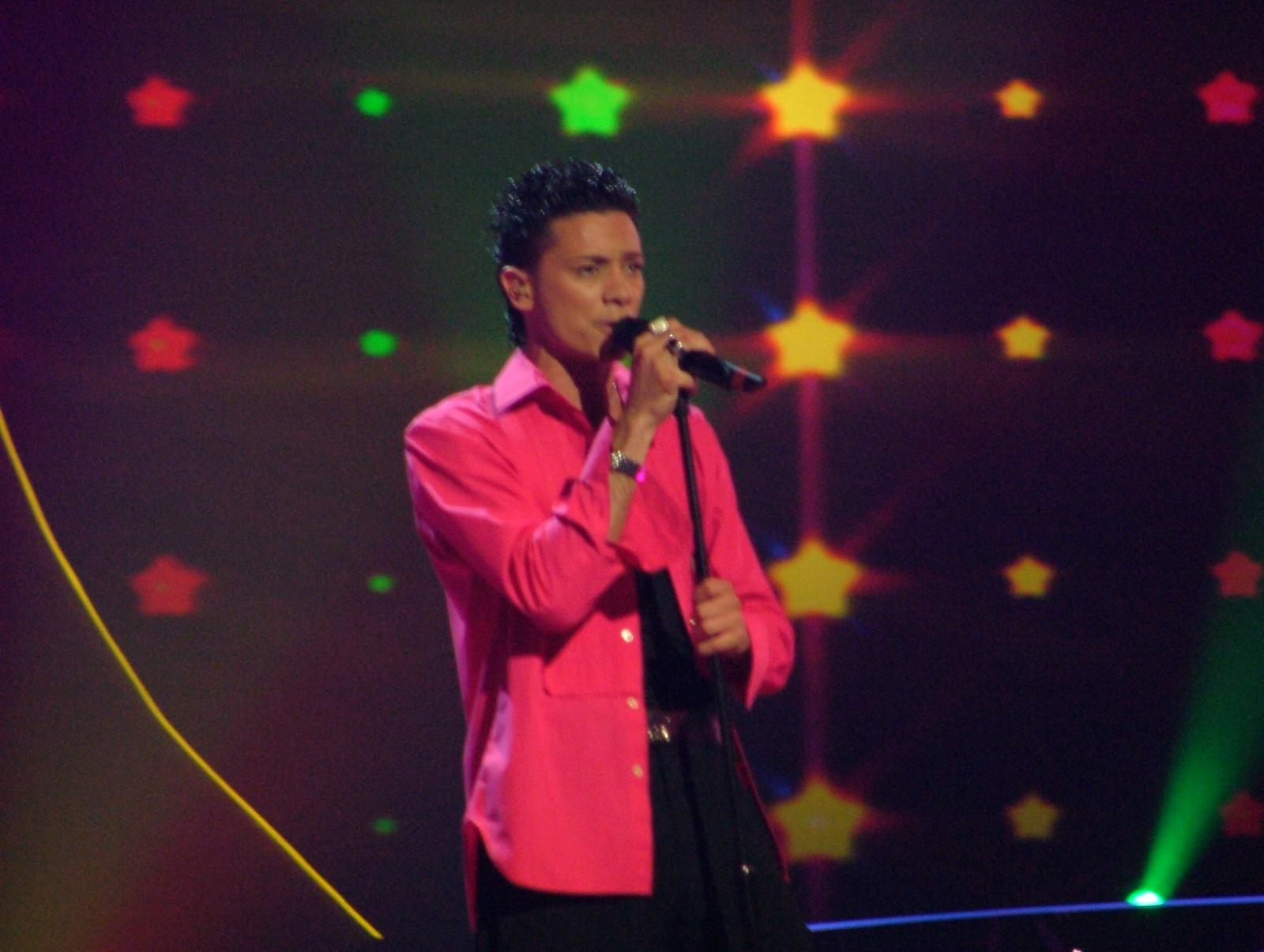
Piero Esteriore performing in Eurovision 2004

Piero Esteriore (born 23 September 1977 in Laufen, Switzerland) is a Swiss singer. He represented Switzerland in Eurovision Song Contest 2004 with the song "Celebrate".

== Career ==
Of Sicilian origin, Esteriore grew up in Aesch, Basel-Landschaft and learned playing the drums when he was six. He studied hairdressing and was trained in the profession. He also pursued music simultaneously.

He auditioned for season 9 of the German Big Brother in Cologne on the episode broadcast on 16 March 2009, but left voluntarily the following week. Then in 2011, he appeared in casting for Das Supertalent. He also played the role of Gary Colman in the German adaptation of Avenue Q on the Théâtre de Saint-Gall.

In 2004, he auditioned for the inaugural series of reality television competition MusicStar on SF Schweizer Fernsehen where he finished third. Representing Switzerland in the semi-finals of Eurovision 2004, he received zero points from all 32 voting nations and failed to advance to the final.

However his debut album 1 Secondo reached #3 on the Swiss Hitparade, the official albums chart in January 2005. His single "Mammamia" placed 10th on the Swiss Singles Chart.

The follow-up album Io vivo in 2007 peaked only at #34 and stayed only 2 weeks in the Swiss Albums chart. Esteriore toured for a number of years with singer Andreas Gabalier in Switzerland, Germany and Austria.

His third album Mondo was released in 2012 and on 8 May 2016, he released the album Zwei2due with a mixture of Swiss-Germann and Italian songs.

== Discography ==
=== Albums ===
Title	Year	Peak positions	
Title	Year	SWI	AUT
1 Secondo	2005	3	–
Io vivo	2007	34	–
Mondo	2012	–	14
Zwei2due	2016	16	–

=== Singles ===
Title	Year	Peak positions	Album
Title	Year	SWI	Album
"Celebrate" (with The MusicStars)	2004	11	
"Mammamia"	2004	10	
"Mare"	2005	53	
"Salta"	2005	38	
