= Katrin Siska =

Estonian musician

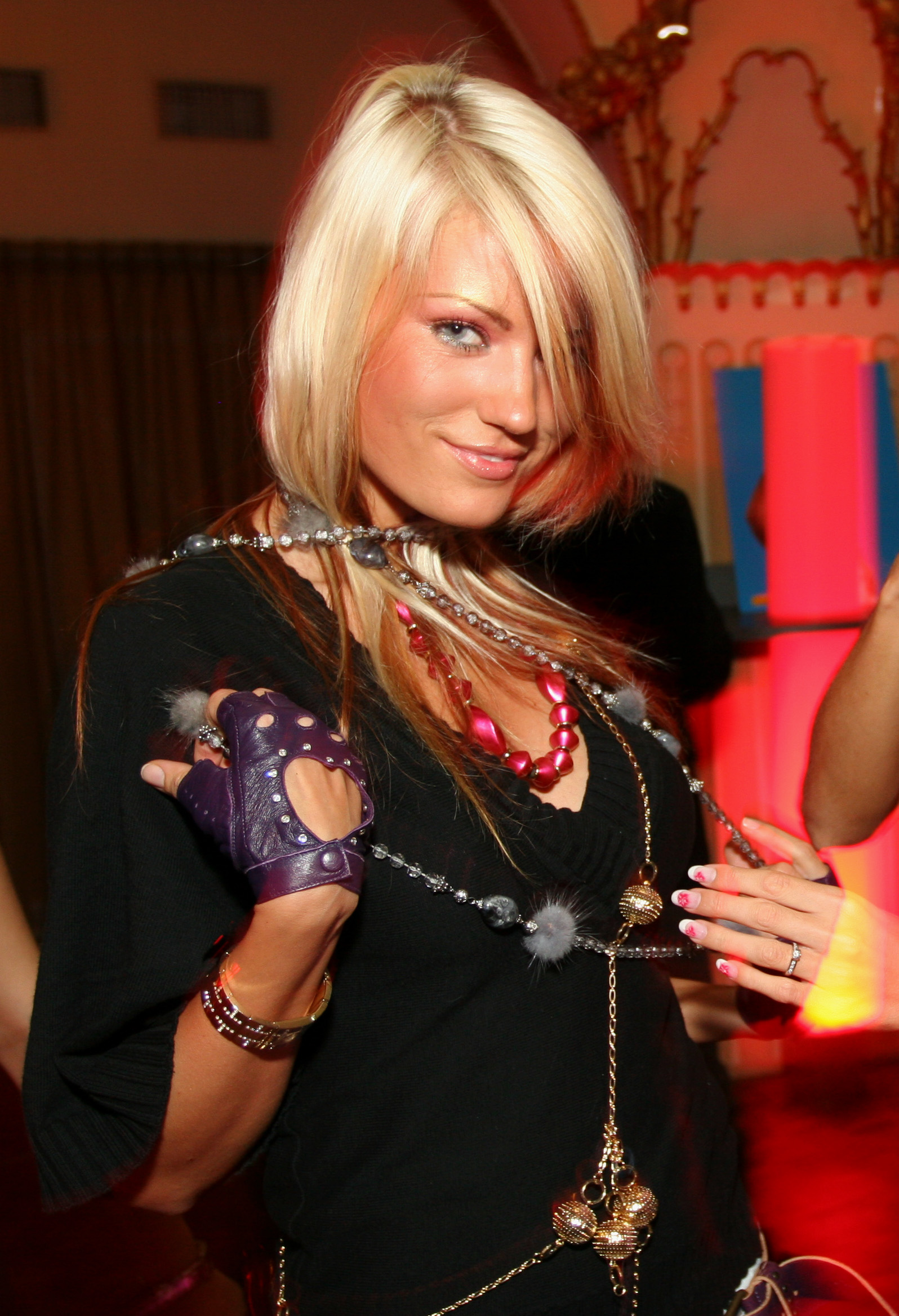

Background information
- Born: 10 December 1983 (age 42); Tallinn, then part of Estonian SSR, Soviet Union
- Origin: Estonia
- Genres: Pop, rock
- Occupation: Singer-songwriter
- Instruments: Vocals, guitar
- Years active: 2002-present

Katrin Siska (born December 10, 1983) is an Estonian vlogger and musician, and a former member of the Estonian girl group Vanilla Ninja.

Siska was born in Tallinn. Alongside her musical commitments, she studied finance and accounting at a vocational school, and international relations and diplomacy in Tallinn. After moving back to Estonia with Vanilla Ninja from Germany in 2006, she returned to university to study law at Tallinn University of Technology.

She is fluent in Estonian, Russian, English, German and Finnish.

Siska was a member of a choir at school, and started playing the piano when she was 7 years old. She has a younger sister.

In August 2009, Siska joined the Estonian Centre Party. She left Vanilla Ninja in 2022.
