= Vanilla Ninja (album) =

2003 album by Vanilla Ninja

Studio album by Vanilla Ninja
- Released: May 30, 2003
- Recorded: 2002–2003
- Genre: Pop rock, hard rock
- Length: 52:09
- Language: English, Estonian
- Label: TopTen
- Producer: Sven Lõhmus

Vanilla Ninja chronology
Vanilla Ninja (2003)	Traces of Sadness (2004)

Singles from Vanilla Ninja
- 1. "Club Kung Fu" Released: 2003

Vanilla Ninja is the first album by the Estonian girl band Vanilla Ninja. The album was released on May 30, 2003, and was only ever released in Estonia, despite the group's subsequent success in Germany, Austria and Switzerland. The album did well in Estonia, and one track, the group's Eurolaul 2003 entry "Club Kung Fu", was released as a single in Germany and reached #95 in March 2004.

The album contained a blend of songs in English and Estonian, as well as a drum 'n' bass remix of "Club Kung Fu". It is the group's only album with songs in Estonian.

"Vanilla Ninja" was certified Platinum in Estonia.

== Track listing ==
1. "Guitar and Old Blue Jeans" – 4:02 (English)
2. "Why?" – 3:22 (English)
3. "Club Kung Fu" – 2:42 (English)
4. "Nagu Rockstaar" – 4:10 (Estonian)
5. "Purunematu" - 3:25 (Estonian)
6. "Inner Radio" – 3:00 (English)
7. "Outcast" – 3:59 (English)
8. "Toxic" – 2:23 (English)
9. "Spit It Out" – 4:46 (English)
10. "Psycho" – 3:17 (English)
11. "Klubikuningad" – 2:05 (Estonian)
12. "Polluter" - 3:23 (English)
13. "Vanad Teksad Ja Kitarr" – 3:40 (Estonian)
14. "Sugar and Honey" – 3:26 (English)
15. "Club Kung Fu" (Drum 'n' Bass Remix) – 4:29 (English)

== Chart positions ==
- Estonia – #1
