= Lenna Kuurmaa =

Estonian singer and actress

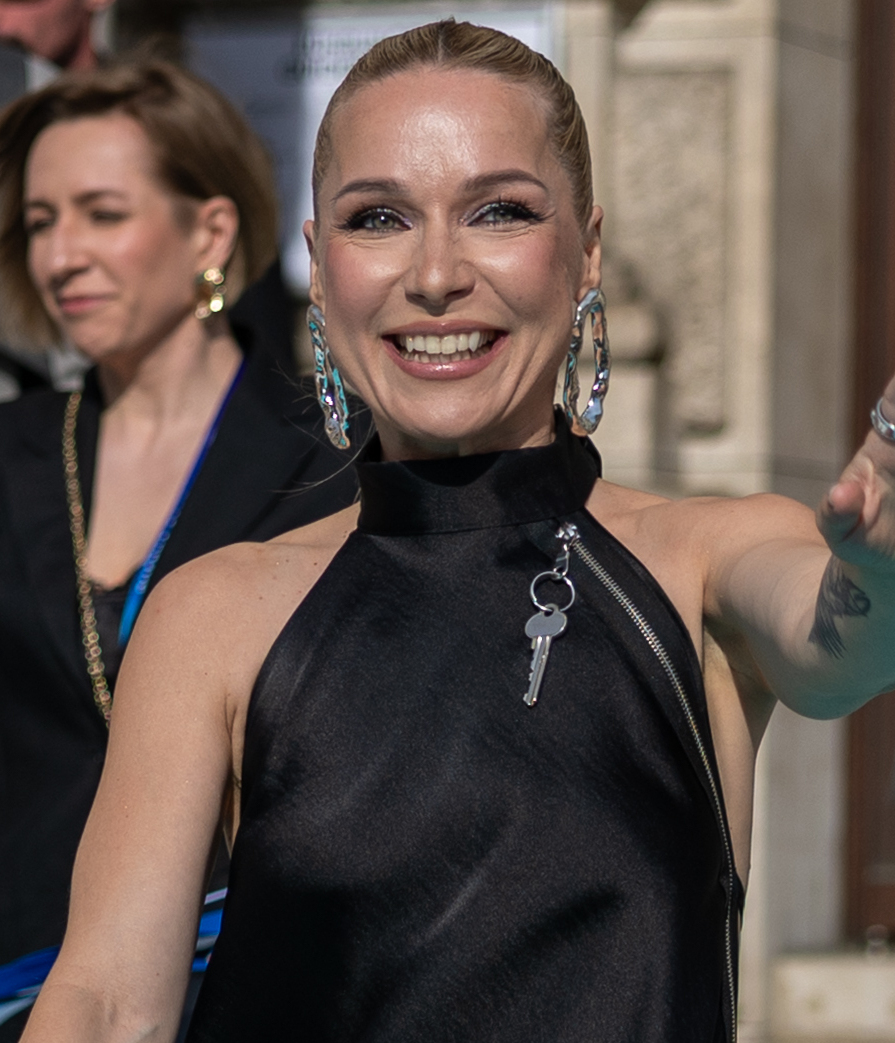
- Kuurmaa in 2026

Background information
- Also known as: Lenna
- Born: 26 September 1985 (age 40); Tallinn, then part of Estonian SSR, Soviet Union
- Genres: Pop, rock
- Occupations: Singing-songwriting, acting
- Instruments: Vocals, guitar
- Labels: Mortimer Snerd & Frontiers Records

Lenna Kuurmaa (born 26 September 1985) is an Estonian singer-songwriter and actress. She is a member of the girl group Vanilla Ninja, but after the band's hiatus since 2009, continued to work as a solo-artist. She also formed a band with the name "Lenna" who released the debut album Lenna in June 2010.

== Musical career ==
From 1990 to 2002, Lenna Kuurmaa was a member of the ETV Lasteekraani Muusikastuudio and performed together with the choir in many festivals internationally (in Italy, the Netherlands, Finland, Denmark, Norway, Israel, the United Kingdom, Spain, USA and Russia). She studied violin in Tallinn Music School from 2000 to 2006 under teacher Urvo Uibokand. She received vocal training from Ester Lepa and Ludmilla Issakova 1997–2002. In 2002 she took part of televised singing contest Fizz Superstar, where she made it to the quarter-finals. In the same year Kuurmaa, together with 3 other girls, formed the rock band Vanilla Ninja. After Vanilla Ninja's hiatus in 2009, Lenna Kuurmaa started working as a solo-musician with the artist-name Lenna. In June 2010, she released her debut album Lenna under Mortimer Snerd. All of the songs were written together with and produced by Vaiko Eplik, who is also the owner of the record label. Her band also performed at the 2010 Shanghai EXPO.

=== Eurovision Song Contest ===
Lenna Kuurmaa has taken part in the Eurovision Song Contest and its national preselection contests with varying success.

- In 2003, with Vanilla Ninja, the song "Club Kung-Fu" was placed at the last position by an international jury at the national preselection contest Eurolaul, even while having a strong popular support.
- Again together with Vanilla Ninja, she represented Switzerland with the song "Cool Vibes" in the Eurovision Song Contest 2005 in Kyiv, where they finished 8th.
- In 2007, Vanilla Ninja participated in Eurolaul 2007 with the song "Birds of Peace", and placed fourth.
- In 2010, Lenna Kuurmaa participated as a solo artist at the national contest Eesti Laul 2010 with the song "Rapunzel", which was co-arranged by Vaiko Eplik. The song finished second.
- In 2012, Lenna participated again in the national contest Eesti Laul 2012 with the song "Mina jään", which finished second.
- In 2014, Lenna participated again in Eesti Laul with the song "Supernoova". She finished fourth.
- In 2017, Lenna participated again in Eesti Laul, this time with the song "Slingshot", finishing eighth.

== Acting ==
Kuurmaa played the second lead role of Maya in the 2007 Estonian film Kuhu põgenevad hinged (Where Souls Go) and Angela in the Estonian soap opera Kodu keset linna, also in 2007. Since 2008, Kuurmaa has taken part in Theatre NO99's play Pericles as a guest-actress. In 2010, she was given a role of an Estonian Security Police investigator in the crime-drama series Kelgukoerad. She has stated that she has no interest in pursuing professional acting education.

She has a role in the 2012 Finnish movie Vuosaari, named after a particular district in Helsinki and the same year appeared as Pille in the Peeter Simm-directed drama Üksik saar. From 2012 until 2014, she appeared as Anne in the Kanal 2 comedy series Tupiktänava mehed. In 2017, Kuurmaa began appearing in the role of Ramilda Martin on the Estonian TV3 crime-comedy series Kättemaksukontor.

== Other activities ==
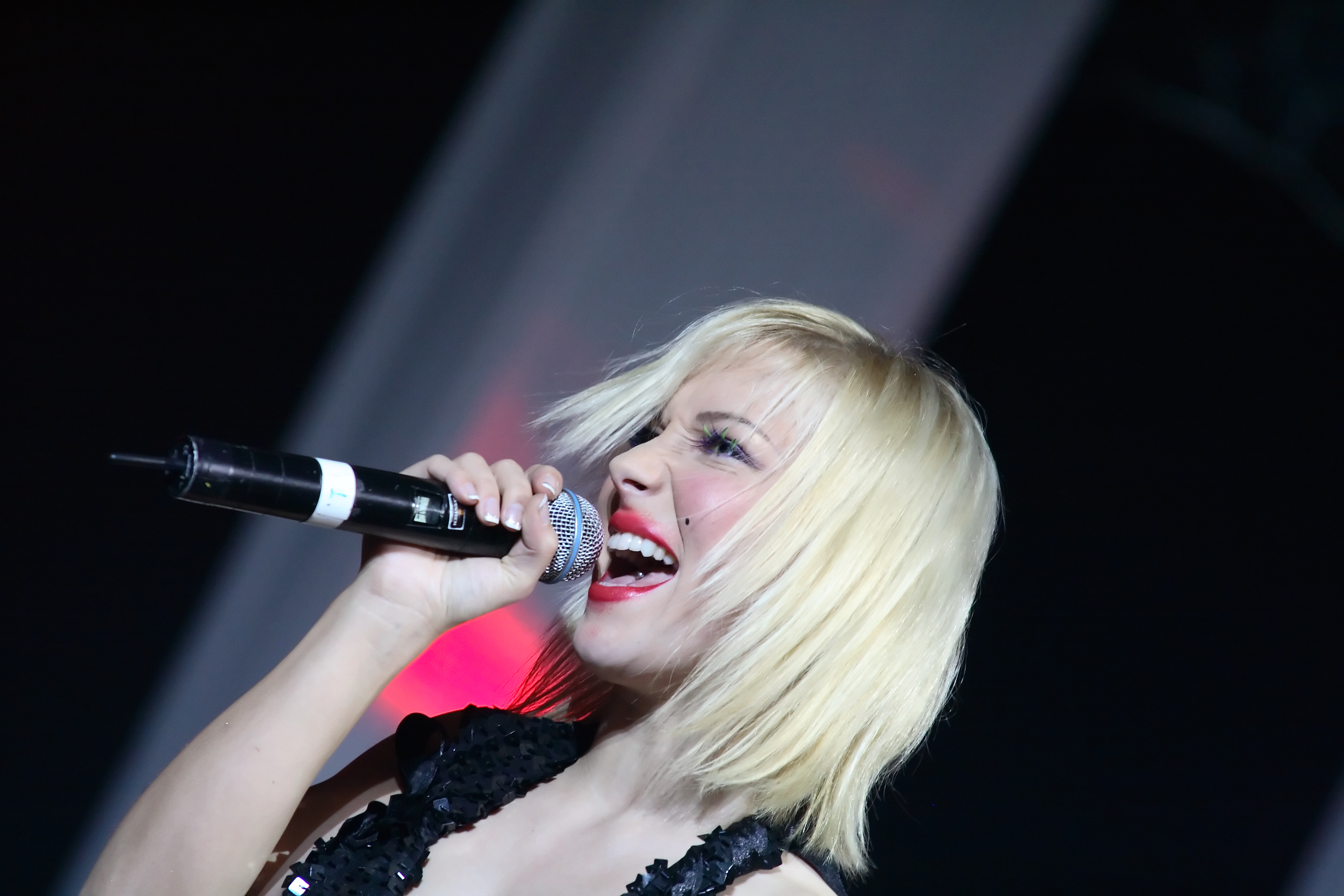
Lenna Kuurma performing at the Raadio 2 Hit of the Year award gala, 2007

Kuurmaa has also worked in television, for example being the host for the song contest Laulukarussell in 2006. She has also hosted programs in the Sky Plus radio since 2007. Kuurmaa is a member of Estonian Performers' Association (EEL) and Estonian Authors' Society (EAÜ). She has been involved in the musical theatre projects Kuningas ja mina (The King and I) and Helisev muusika (The Sound of Music). In 2007, Lenna Kuurmaa was chosen by the audience of Raadio 2 to be a singer in the Unistuste Bänd (Dream Band), a supergroup composed of popular Estonian musicians for a one-time performance at Raadio 2 Hit of the Year award gala.

In 2010, she participated in the TV3 series "Laulud tähtedega" with Artur Talvik. In 2015, she took part of the Estonian version of the TV show Stars in Their Eyes.

== Discography ==
=== Albums ===
Title	Details
Lenna	Released: 18 May 2010; Label: Mortimer Snerd; Format: CD, digital download
Teine	Released: 2013; Label: Raud Meedia; Format: CD, digital download
Moonland (with Moonland)	Released: 23 September 2014; Label: Frontiers Records; Format: CD, digital download
3X	Released: 3 December 2018; Label: Made In Baltics, Sony Music; Format: CD, digital download

=== Singles ===
==== As lead artist ====
Title	Year	Peak chart positions	Album
Title	Year	EST	Album
"Rapunzel"	2010	1	Lenna
"Musta pori näkku" (with Mihkel Raud)	2010	—	Lenna
"Kogu tõde jüriööst"	2010	—	Lenna
"Mida sa teed"	2010	—	Lenna
"Maailm ei keerle"	2011	—	Lenna
"Hüvasti, Maa"	2011	—	Lenna
"Mina jään"	2012	1	Teine
"Sinule"	2013	—	Non-album single
"Seal, kus jäljed kaovad maast"	2013	14	Teine
"Supernoova"	2013	10	Teine
"Heaven Is To Be Close to You" (with Moonland)	2014	—	Moonland
"Open Your Heart" (with Moonland)	2014	—	Moonland
"Live and let go" (with Moonland)	2014	—	Moonland
"Veel ei tea"	2015	—	Non-album singles
"Suvehommik Setumaal"	2015	—	Non-album singles
"Õnnega koos"	2016	—	Non-album singles
"Slingshot"	2017	—	TBA
"—" denotes a single that did not chart or was not released in that territory.

==== As featured artist ====
Title	Year	Peak chart positions	Album
Title	Year	EST	Album
"Sellel ööl" (Violina featuring Lenna Kuurmaa)	2010	20	Non-album single
"—" denotes a single that did not chart or was not released in that territory.

==== Other songs ====
- "Saatus naerdes homse toob/Think idly"
- "Loomeinimesed"
- "Like a kid"
- "Mine tee tööd"
- "Vara" (with Slide-Fifty)
- "Rada" (with Mikk Saar)
- "Sinuni" (with Ott Lepland)
- "Kallim kullast (with Koit Toome)
- "Eesti, Eesti, Eesti"
- "Falling Star"
- Taevatähtedest Tee (with Ivo Linna and Supernova)
