= Traces of Sadness =

2004 album by Vanilla Ninja

Studio album by Vanilla Ninja
- Released: June 7, 2004
- Recorded: 2003–2004; Bros Music Studios
- Genre: Pop rock, hard rock
- Length: 57:05
- Language: English
- Label: Bros
- Producer: David Brandes

Vanilla Ninja chronology
Vanilla Ninja (2003)	Traces of Sadness (2004)	Blue Tattoo (2005)

Singles from Traces of Sadness
- 1. "Tough Enough" Released: 24 November 2003; 2. "Don't Go Too Fast" Released: 22 March 2004; 3. "Liar" Released: 24 May 2004; 4. "When the Indians Cry" Released: 23 August 2004

Professional ratings
Review scores
Source	Rating
CD Starts	5/10 stars

Traces of Sadness is the second album by the Estonian girl band Vanilla Ninja. Released in June 2004, the album included the hit singles "Tough Enough", "Liar" and "When the Indians Cry". It peaked at number three in the German album charts and brought the girls into the mainstream, while increasing their popularity in other countries such as Switzerland and Austria, staying in the charts for almost a full year in the former. "Traces of Sadness" was certified Gold (100,000 copies) by the IFPI in Germany, Gold in Austria (15,000 copies) and Platinum in Estonia.

== Track listing ==
1. "Tough Enough" – 3:24
2. "Traces of Sadness" – 3:23
3. "Stay" – 3:54
4. "When the Indians Cry" – 3:44
5. "Don't Go Too Fast" – 3:14
6. "Heartless" – 3:51
7. "Liar" – 3:38
8. "Don't You Realize" – 3:52
9. "Wherever" – 3:26
10. "Metal Queen" – 3:27
11. "Looking For a Hero" – 3:55
12. "Destroyed By You" – 3:54
13. "Traces of Sadness" (Extended version) – 5:56
14. "Heartless" (Extended version) – 7:38

The album also contained two extras:

- Tough Enough (Video)
- Don't Go Too Fast (Video)

== Limited edition bonus CD ==
1. "Blue Tattoo" (Unplugged version)
2. "Tough Enough" (Unplugged version)
3. "Don't Go Too Fast" (Unplugged version)
4. "Liar" (Unplugged version)
5. "Stay" (Unplugged version)
6. "Metal Queen" (Unplugged version)
7. "Destroyed By You" (Unplugged version)
8. "Don't You Realize" (Classical version)
9. "Heartless" (Classical version)
10. "Traces Of Sadness" (Classical version)
11. "Looking For A Hero" (Classical version)
12. "Light Of Hope"

The limited edition of the album also contained two extras:

- Liar (Video)
- When The Indians Cry (Video)

== Appearance in music games ==
A shorter version of the songs "Liar", "Metal Queen" and "Tough Enough" were made playable in Drummania V2/GuitarFreaks V2/Dance Dance Revolution Ultramix 2. "Tough Enough" was also available to play on the arcade release of Dancing Stage Fusion. However, it was not included with the home release for PlayStation or PlayStation 2.

== Chart positions ==
- Estonia – #1
- Germany – #3
- Austria – #4
- Switzerland – #14
- Czech Republic – #37
- Poland – #37

== Certifications ==
Certifications for "Traces of Sadness"
Region	Certification	Certified units/sales
Austria (IFPI Austria)	Gold	15,000^{*}
Germany (BVMI)	Gold	100,000^{^}
^{*} Sales figures based on certification alone.^{^} Shipments figures based on certification alone.
