= Kroonika =

Estonian magazine

Kroonika (meaning The Chronicle in English) is an Estonian magazine. It is most popular among young Estonian-speaking readers aged between 13 and 30.

== History and profile ==
Kroonika was established in 1996. Its previous publishers were Kroonpress Ltd. and AS Ajakirjade Kirjastus. The magazine is published in the Estonian language by Delfi Meedia and includes gossip and news on the country's biggest celebrities. It is published weekly on Fridays and is based in Tallinn. Its editor-in-chief is Ingrid Veidenberg.

Erika Salumäe, an Estonian track bicycle racer and Olympic champion, sued the magazine for publishing damaging and insulting news about her in 2016. In 2018 the publisher, Ekspress Meedia, was ordered by the court to pay Salumäe 9,500 Euros.
