= TopTen =

Estonian record label

TopTen is an Estonian record label which has started the career of a number of successful Baltic chart acts, including the internationally successful girl group Vanilla Ninja, which enjoyed chat success in a number of countries across Europe, especially in Estonia, Germany and Austria, and are currently the label's most successful act.

== See also ==
- Lists of record labels
