= Blue Tattoo =

2005 album by Vanilla Ninja

Studio album by Vanilla Ninja
- Released: March 14, 2005
- Recorded: 2004–2005
- Genre: Pop rock, hard rock, Gothic Rock
- Length: 58:54
- Language: English
- Label: Bros Records
- Producer: David Brandes

Vanilla Ninja chronology
Traces of Sadness (2004)	Blue Tattoo (2005)	Best Of (2005)

Blue Tattoo is the third album by the Estonian girl band Vanilla Ninja, and the last original Vanilla Ninja album released by Bros Records. Following the successful 2004 album Traces of Sadness, Blue Tattoo was the group's most successful album yet with the singles "Blue Tattoo" (from which the album gets its name), "I Know" and "Cool Vibes". "Cool Vibes" was also the 2005 Swiss Eurovision entry, increasing the album's popularity in Switzerland.

In both Switzerland and Germany it peaked at #4 in the charts, with an Austrian chart high of #7. The album also topped the Estonian album chart.

== Track listing ==
1. "Blue Tattoo" – 4:07
2. "Cool Vibes" – 3:00
3. "Never Gotta Know" – 3:16
4. "Just Another Day to Live" – 4:40
5. "I Don't Care at All" – 3:56
6. "The Coldest Night" – 3:30
7. "Hellracer" – 3:32
8. "I Know" – 3:17
9. "Corner of My Mind" – 3:18
10. "Undercover Girl" – 3:12
11. "My Puzzle of Dreams" – 2:59
12. "Nero" – 3:30
13. "Just Another Day to Live" (Extended version) – 9:24
14. "Corner of My Mind" (Extended version) – 7:23

The album also contained two extras:

- Blue Tattoo (Video)
- I Know (Video)

== Limited edition bonus CD ==
1. "Just Another Day To Live" (Classical version)
2. "Coole Vibes" (Classical version)
3. "My Puzzle Of Dreams" (Classical version)
4. "The Coldest Night" (Classical version)
5. "Corner Of My Mind" (Classical version)
6. "Blue Tattoo" (Classical version)
7. "Nero" (Classical version)
8. "I Don't Care At All" (Unplugged version)
9. "Never Gotta Know" (Unplugged version)
10. "Hellracer" (Unplugged version)
11. "I Know" (Unplugged version)
12. "Undercover Girl" (Unplugged version)

The limited edition of the album also contained two extras:

- Cool Vibes (Video)
- I Know (Unplugged version video)
