= Bros Music =

German record label

Bros Music is a Central European record label owned by the major record company Sony Music Entertainment. The label is based in Germany and is the home to several successful chart acts, including E-Rotic, Marya Roxx, Bad Boys Blue, Gracia, Chris Norman and Virus Incorporation. The label was also the home of the girl group Vanilla Ninja from mid-2004 to late 2005, before the group parted company with Bros on bad terms. Bros Records is the primary home of all artists managed by David Brandes.

== See also ==
- List of record labels
- David Brandes
