= Marya Roxx =

Estonian recording artist and vocalist

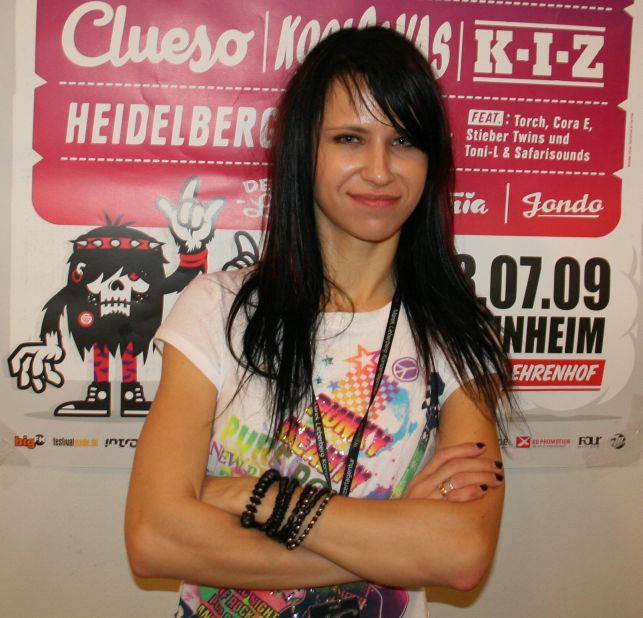
- Marya Roxx in 2009

Background information
- Born: Maarja Kivi; 18 January 1986 (age 40); Tallinn, then part of Estonian SSR, Soviet Union
- Genres: Hard rock, heavy metal
- Occupations: Singer, songwriter
- Instruments: Vocals, bass
- Years active: 1993–present
- Label: Global Music Group
- Formerly of: Vanilla Ninja
- Website: maryaroxx.com

Marya Roxx (born Maarja Kivi on 18 January 1986) is an Estonian hard rock/metal singer-songwriter residing in Los Angeles. She is a former member of the Estonian girl band Vanilla Ninja.

== Background ==
When the girl band Vanilla Ninja was founded in 2003, Kivi was selected as one of the solo singers and the bass player. She recorded two albums with the band, Vanilla Ninja and Traces Of Sadness. She left the group in mid-2004. She has a daughter, Dora-Liisa (born 2004), and son, Angus Martin (born 2012) with husband and former Vanilla Ninja manager Renee Meriste.

== Solo career ==
Roxx teamed up with producer Kevin Shirley to record her debut album 'Payback Time'. It features musicians Paul Crook as a guitarist, Scott Metaxas on bass, Derek Sherinian on keyboards and Brian Tichy as the drummer. 21?! EP was released from this recording in 2008. It contains four songs, "'21?!'", "Oh Yeah", "Rebel", (all written by Roxx), and "Nothing Going On" originally recorded by Swedish band Clawfinger. Marya also wrote her solo album in Malibu with producer called Kevin Shirley aka "Caveman."

In May 2009, she performed as the warm-up act on the European tour of pop/rock artist LaFee. Roxx's band for her last performances was former Anthrax guitarist Paul Crook, Scott Metaxas and Jim Roe.

Her debut album, "Payback Time" was published on 5 October 2010. In January 2006 Marya's debut "Could You" was a success for her in many countries like Germany and Finland.

== Discography ==
=== Albums ===
- 2010: Payback Time
- 2015: Land of Dreams (EP)

=== Singles ===
Year	Title	Peak chart			Release date
Year	Title	DE	AT	CH	Release date
2006	Could You	47	—	35	Released: January 20, 2006
2006	Shine It On	48	53	—	Released: September 15, 2006
2008	21?! EP	—	—	—	Released: January 25, 2008

=== Other songs ===
- 2002: A Dream Song from the Eurolaul 2002

== Awards ==
- "21?! Best Hard Rock Song Mavric Awards 2009 and "Rebel" Best Punk Song Mavric Awards 2009.

== Tours ==
- European Tour 2009
- UK Tour 2009
- Time To Run 2010 Tour
- Rebel Wave 2010 Tour
