= Estonian Music Awards =

Annual concert and award presentations

Eesti Muusikaauhinnad
- Country: Estonia
- Presented by: Estonian Association of the Phonogram Producers
- First award: 1998
- Website: www.muusikaauhinnad.eu

The Estonian Music Awards (Estonian: Eesti Muusikaauhinnad) is an annual non-profit gala concert with the goal of recognizing outstanding Estonian musicians and popularising Estonian music. The concert is organized and the awards are presented by the Estonian Association of the Phonogram Producers (EFÜ). The awards ceremony is broadcast on television.

The awards began in 1998, when the EFÜ first awarded the Golden Record (Estonian: Kuldne Plaat) to the most successful artists. In 1998–1999, the Golden Records Music Awards was presented in cooperation with the Estonian Authors' Association and the Estonian Performers' Association.

In 2000, the logo and name of the award were changed. Artists were selected based on the voting results of juries – which included music editors, presenters, music teachers, musicians, DJs, concert organizers, producers, etc. In six categories, juries of 100 members were formed, and in three categories, juries of up to 15 members were formed. In addition, nominees and laureates were selected based on rankings.

== Categories ==
Below are the current categories as of 2025.

1. Album of the Year
2. Debut Album of the Year
3. Female Artist of the Year
4. Male Artist of the Year
5. Ensemble of the Year
6. Jazz Album of the Year
7. Ethno/Folk/Folk Album of the Year
8. Original Song Album of the Year
9. Hip-Hop/Rap Artist of the year
10. Soul/Funk/R'n'B Artist of the Year
11. Metal Album of the Year
12. Rock Album of the Year
13. Classical Album of the Year – the nominees for the category "Classical Album of the Year" are the albums that received the most votes in each classical genre category.
  - Solo or Chamber Music Album of the Year
  - Orchestra or Stage Music Album of the Year
  - Choral Music Album of the Year
  - Estonian Composition Album of the Year
14. Song of the Year
15. Music Video of the Year
16. Contribution to Estonian Music

== History ==
=== 1998 ===
Estonian phonogram producers first felt the need to recognize the best of Estonian pop music by creating the Estonian Pop Music Annual Awards Golden Disc in 1998, when the most successful artists were awarded the Estonian Pop Music Annual Awards Golden Record 1998. The awards ceremony took place and was recorded at the Estonian Television (ETV) studio on December 29, 1998, and aired as a 40-minute television program two days later, on the last day of the year.

The 1998 awards were presented in 9 categories: Most Successful Female Singer, Most Successful Male Singer, Most Successful Ensemble, Most Successful Debut, The Most Successful Record Company, Most played radio hit, The most played hit in dance halls, Album of the Year, and Music Video of the Year. In addition, one special award was given: Best Police Officer in the Fight Against Piracy in 1998.

=== 1999 ===
The Estonian Pop Music Annual Awards Golden Disc 1999 Gala took place at the Tallinn nightclub “Venus” on March 3, 2000. It was broadcast live by both ETV and Raadio 2. In 1999, the award categories were renamed as an innovation and two new categories were added – Album Design of the Year and Contribution to Estonian Pop Music.

The 1999 awards were presented in 10 categories: Male Artist of the Year, Debut Album of the Year, Ensemble of the Year, Radio Hit of the Year, Dance Hit of the Year, Music Video of the Year, Record Label of the Year, Album Design of the Year, Album of the Year, Contribution to Estonian Pop Music.

=== 2000 ===
In 2000, the event was renamed to Estonian Music Awards (Estonian: Eesti Muusikaauhinnad). The difference compared to the two previous years is that the EFÜ started to determine the nominees and winners based on the jury voting results from 2000.

Impartial juries of 100 members were formed in six categories. Nominees and laureates were determined based on rankings. The juries consisted of individuals active in various fields of music in Estonia (for example, music editors, presenters, teachers, musicians, DJs, concert organizers, producers, etc.). For the first time, a comprehensive set of rules for music awards was also developed, which included the conditions for nomination, criteria for determining nominees and winners, and the composition and work of the juries. When determining nominees and winners, the jury members had to take into account, among other things, the following criteria - sales success, the idea and execution of the performance or music video or album design, playability on radio and television, the success of concerts, and the impact on Estonian music in general and more broadly.

At the award ceremony held on March 3, 2001 at the Decolte nightclub. New awards were added that included multiple genres of music, rather than just pop music, including ethno/folk, jazz/blues and classical music categories. One of the special awards recognized the fight against piracy – the Music Supporter of the Year award was given to Äripäev journalist Peep Sooman for his articles on piracy.

Cooperation with ETV and Raadio 2 continued, both of which broadcast the event live, providing extensive advance advertising for the event in the form of commercials, interviews, etc. The 2000 awards were presented in 14 categories: Male Artist of the Year, Female Artist of the Year, Newcomer of the Year, Ensemble of the Year, Jazz/Blues Artist of the Year, Ethno/Folk Artist of the Year, Classical Artist of the Year, Music Video of the Year, Album Design of the Year, Radio Hit of the Year, Dance Hit of the Year, Record Label of the Year, Music Supporter of the Year, Contribution to Estonian Music.

=== 2001 ===
The Estonian Music Awards 2001 took place on March 3 at Saku Suurhall. Awards were presented in 15 categories: Male Artist of the Year, Female Artist of the Year, Newcomer of the Year, Ensemble of the Year, Dance Artist of the Year, Jazz/Blues Artist of the Year, Ethno/Folk Artist of the Year, Classical Artist of the Year, Alternative Artist of the Year, Music Video of the Year, Album Design of the Year, Radio Hit of the Year, Dance Hit of the Year, Artist of the Year, Contribution to Estonian Music.

=== 2002 ===
There was no award ceremony in 2002, likely due to the Eurovision Song Contest 2002 being held in Tallinn.

=== 2003 ===
The Estonian Music Awards 2003 took place on March 15 at the Saku Suurhall. Awards were presented in 15 categories: Male Artist of the Year, Female Artist of the Year, Ensemble of the Year, Newcomer of the Year, Dance Artist of the Year, Jazz Artist of the Year, Ethno/Folk Artist of the Year, Alternative Artist of the Year, Classical Album of the Year, Hit Song of the Year, Music Video of the Year, Album Design of the Year, Artist of the Year, Foreign Artist of the Year, Contribution to Estonian Music.

=== 2004 ===
The Estonian Music Awards 2004 took place on March 3, 2004 at the Sokos Hotel Viru. The awards ceremony was broadcast live by TV3. Awards were presented in 13 categories: Male Artist of the Year, Female Artist of the Year, Ensemble of the Year, Newcomer of the Year, Jazz/Blues Artist of the Year, Ethno/Folk Artist of the Year, Alternative Artist of the Year, Classical Artist of the Year, Hit Song of the Year, Album Design of the Year, Music Video of the Year, Contribution to Estonian Music, Artist of the Year.

=== 2005 ===
On March 2, the Estonian Music Awards 2005 were presented at Club Parlament. In addition to the award ceremony, Koer, Toe Tag, Soul Militia, Cool D, Julia Boman and Slobodan River performed. Awards were presented in 16 categories: Male Artist of the Year, Female Artist of the Year, Ensemble of the Year, Album of the Year, Newcomer of the Year, Jazz/Blues Artist of the Year, Ethno/Folk Artist of the Year, HipHop/RnB Artist of the Year, Electronic Artist of the Year, Metal/Punk Artist of the Year, Classical Album of the Year, Hit Song of the Year, Album Design of the Year, Music Video of the Year, Artist of the Year, Contribution to Estonian Music.

=== 2006 ===
On March 19, 2006, the Estonian Music Awards 2006 were presented at the Vanemuine Concert Hall. Awards were presented in 17 categories: Album of the Year, Ensemble of the Year, Male Artist of the Year, Female Artist of the Year, Newcomer of the Year, Rock Artist of the Year, Jazz/Blues Artist of the Year, Ethno/Folk Artist of the Year, HipHop/RnB Artist of the Year, Electronic Artist of the Year, Metal/Punk Artist of the Year, Classical Album of the Year, Hit Song of the Year, Album Design of the Year, Music Video of the Year, Artist of the Year, Contribution to Estonian Music.

=== 2007 ===
At the Estonian Music Awards 2007, awards were presented in 15 categories: Album of the Year, Newcomer of the Year, HipHop/RnB Artist of the Year, Electronic Artist of the Year, Metal/Punk Artist of the Year, Rock Artist of the Year, Jazz Artist of the Year, Ethno/Folk Art of the Year, Female Artist of the Year, Hit Song of the Year, Ensemble of the Year, Male Artist of the Year, Album Design of the Year, Music Video of the Year, Contribution to Estonian Music.

=== 2008 ===
The annual music awards were presented at the A.Le Coq Live Estonian Music Awards 2008 gala concert, held at the Pärnu Concert Hall on April 1. Various artists took to the stage with programs and lineups specially created for the evening. The evening was hosted by Hannes Võrno and the event was broadcast live by TV3. Awards were presented in 15 categories: Album of the Year, Ensemble of the Year, Newcomer of the Year, HipHop/RnB Artist of the Year, Electronic Artist of the Year, Metal/Punk Artist of the Year, Rock Artist of the Year, Male Artist of the Year, Jazz/Blues Artist of the Year, Ethno/Folk Artist of the Year, Female Artist of the Year, Hit Song of the Year, Music Video of the Year, Album Design of the Year, Contribution to Estonian Music.

=== 2009 ===
The A. Le Coq Live Estonian Music Awards 2009 gala took place on March 19 at the Russian Theatre. Awards were presented in 15 categories: Album of the Year, Ensemble of the Year, Newcomer of the Year, Male Artist of the Year, Female Artist of the Year, Jazz/Blues Artist of the Year, Ethno/Folk Artist of the Year, Electronic Artist of the Year, HipHip/RnB Artist of the Year, Metal Artist of the Year, Rock Artist of the Year, Pop Artist of the Year, Music Video of the Year, People's Choice of the Year, Contribution to Estonian Music.

=== 2010 ===
The A. Le Coq Live Estonian Music Awards 2010 gala took place on February 25 at the Nokia Concert Hall. Awards were presented in 15 categories: Album of the Year, Ensemble of the Year, Newcomer of the Year, Male Artist of the Year, Female Artist of the Year, Jazz/Blues Artist of the Year, Electronic Artist of the Year, HipHop/RnB Artist of the Year, Metal/Punk Artist of the Year, Music Video of the Year, Pop Artist of the Year, Rock Artist of the Year, Ethno/Folk Artist of the Year, Audience Favorite, Contribution to Estonian Music.

=== 2011 ===
The A. Le Coq Live Estonian Music Awards 2011 gala was held at the Nokia Concert Hall and featured performances by Koit Toome, The Sun, Metsatöll ja Zetod, Ott Lepland, Lenna, Liisi Koikson, Singer Vinger and Ultima Thule. Scandinavian rock band Sunrise Avenue introduced themselves to the Estonian audience for the first time. Awards were presented in 15 categories: Album of the Year, Ensemble of the Year, Debut Album of the Year, Male Artist of the Year, Female Artist of the Year, Jazz Artist of the Year, Ethno/Folk Artist of the Year, Electronic Artist of the Year, HipHop Artist of the Year, Metal Artist of the Year, Rock Artist of the Year, Pop Artist of the Year, Music Video of the Year, Best Song of the Year, Contribution to Estonian music.

=== 2012 ===
The Estonian Music Awards 2012 gala took place on February 2 at the Nokia Concert Hall. Awards were presented in 15 categories: Album of the Year, Ensemble of the Year, Debut Album of the Year, Male Artist of the Year, Female Artist of the Year, Jazz Album of the Year, Ethno/Folk Album of the Year, Electronic Album of the Year, Alternative Album of the Year, Metal Album of the Year, Rock Album of the Year, Pop Album of the Year, Music Video of the Year, Best Song of the Year, Contribution to Estonian music.

=== 2013 ===
The Estonian Music Awards 2013 gala took place on February 14. Põhja-Tallinn won the most awards with three trophies, while Vaiko Eplik and Ott Lepland each took home two awards. Iiris was named Female Artist of the Year and Ott Lepland was named Male Artist of the Year. The latter also won the title of Pop Album of the Year. The most valuable trophy of the Estonian Music Awards, Album of the Year, was won by Vaiko Eplik for his album Varielu. Vaiko Eplik also won the Rock Album of the Year award. The high recognition, Contribution to Estonian Music, was awarded to well-known music figure Anne Erm. The jury awarded the Best Song of the Year award to Lenna for her song Mina jään (I'll Stay), and the Music Video of the Year went to Kerli. Black Velvet, Iiris, Ott Lepland, Tiger Milk, Vaiko Eplik, Lenna, Tenfold Rabbit and Põhja-Tallinn performed at the gala.

Awards were presented in 16 categories: Album of the Year, Ensemble of the Year, Debut Album of the Year, Male Artist of the Year, Female Artist of the Year, Jazz Album of the Year, Ethno/Folk Album of the Year, Electronic Album of the Year, Alternative/Indie Album of the Year, Metal Album of the Year, Rock Album of the Year, Pop Album of the Year, Music Video of the Year, Best Song of the Year, Hip-Hop/Rap Album of the Year, Contribution to Estonian Music.

=== 2014 ===
The 2014 Estonian Music Awards was held on January 30, 2014 at the Nokia Concert Hall. Birgit Õigemeel and Vallatud Vestid, Facelift Deer, Kerli, Kõrsikud, HU?, Lenna, Metsakutsu and Grete Paia, Winny Puhh, Karl-Erik Taukar and Anne Veski performed. The jury awarded three artists the title of winner in more than one category: Kõrsikud, Facelift Deer, and Leslie Da Bass, who took home two awards each.

Awards were presented in 19 categories: Album of the Year, Ensemble of the Year, Debut Album of the Year, Male Artist of the Year, Female Artist of the Year, Classical Album of the Year, Jazz Album of the Year, Ethno/Folk Album of the Year, Electronic Album of the Year, Alternative/Indie Album of the Year, Metal Album of the Year, Rock Album of the Year, Pop Album of the Year, Music Video of the Year, Best Song of the Year, Hip-Hop/Rap/R'n'B Album of the Year, Folk Album of the Year, Album Design of the Year, Contribution to Estonian Music.

=== 2015 ===
Curly Strings was the biggest winner at the Estonian Music Awards 2015, taking home four trophies. Karl-Erik Taukar, Maria Minerva and Trad.Attack! won in two categories each. The gala concert featured performances by Tanja, Ewert And The Two Dragons, Curly Strings, Karl-Erik Taukar, Elephants From Neptune, Genka & Paul Oja, and Getter Jaani & Risto Vürst. The evening was hosted by Ott Lepland and Ines.

Awards were presented in 17 categories: Album of the Year, Best Song of the Year, Music Video of the Year, Male Artist of the Year, Female Artist of the Year, Band of the Year, Debut Album of the Year, Jazz Album of the Year, Ethno/Folk/Popular Album of the Year, Electronic Album of the Year, Hip-Hop/Rap Album of the Year, Alternative/Indie Album of the Year, Metal Album of the Year, Rock Album of the Year, Pop Album of the Year, Classical Album of the Year, Contribution to Estonian Music.

=== 2016 ===
Elina Born was the biggest winner at the Estonian Music Awards 2016, taking home four trophies. Trad.Attack! won three awards, including Album of the Year. Karl-Erik Taukar, Liis Lemsalu, Justament, Jüri Pootsmann, Elina Born, Tanel Padar & The Sun, Cartoon, Trad.Attack!, Leslie Da Bass performed . The evening was hosted by Karl-Erik Taukar and Liis Lemsalu.

Awards were presented in 17 categories: Jazz Album of the Year, Ethno/Folk/Popular Album of the Year, Electronic Album of the Year, Alternative/Indie Album of the Year, Metal Album of the Year, Rock Album of the Year, Pop Album of the Year, Hip-Hop/Rap/R'n'B Album of the Year, Classical Album of the Year, Debut Album of the Year, Female Artist of the Year, Male Artist of the Year, Ensemble of the Year, Music Video of the Year, Best Song of the Year, Album of the Year, Contribution to Estonian Music.

=== 2017 ===
The Estonian Music Awards 2017 gala took place on January 26. Karl-Erik Taukar was the most successful with three awards, while Kadri Voorand and Elephants From Neptune won two trophies. The awards ceremony was broadcast live by TV3. The evening was hosted by Tanja Mihhailova-Saar and Mikk Saar, who also made a surprise appearance on the show. The concert featured performances by Liis Lemsalu, Laura, Lenna, Metsakutsu, NOËP, I Wear* Experiment, Karl-Erik Taukar, Mick Pedaja, and Estonian Voices.

2017 marked the first year that the Classical music genre was split into sub-genres. The nominees for the category "Classical Album of the Year" are the albums that received the most votes in each classical genre category: Solo or Chamber Music Album of the Year, Orchestra or Stage Music Album of the Year, Choral Music Album of the Year, Estonian Composition Album of the Year.

Awards were presented in 17 main categories: Album of the Year, Female Artist of the Year, Male Artist of the Year, Ensemble of the Year, Debut Album of the Year, Jazz Album of the Year, Ethno/Folk/Popular Album of the Year, Electronic Album of the Year, Alternative/Indie Album of the Year, Metal Album of the Year, Rock Album of the Year, Pop Album of the Year, Hip-Hop/Rap/R'n'B Album of the Year, Classical Album of the Year (Sub categories: Composition Album of the Year, Chamber Music Albums of the Year, Choral Music Album of the Year, Symphonic or Stage Music Album of the Year), Music Video of the Year, Best Song of the Year, Contribution to Estonian Music.

=== 2018 ===
The Estonian Music Awards 2018 celebrated the ceremony's 20th anniversary with a gala held in the Saku Suurhall. The show offered several performances with special effects, and over 20 artists performed including 2 Quick Start, Trad.Attack!, Liis Lemsalu, Miljardid and NOËP. The Estonian hip-hop cannonball consisting of reket, Beebilõust, Arop, Genka and 5MIINUST surprised with a unique joint number. The gala was broadcast live on January 25 on Kanal 2. The evening was hosted by Eda-Ines Etti and Karl-Erik Taukar. The most successful winners were Miljardid with three awards, while Trad.Attack!, Liis Lemsalu and Erki Pärnoja each won two trophies. 2 Quick Starts were recognized with the Contribution to Estonian Music award.

Awards were presented in 17 main categories: Album of the Year, Female Artist of the Year, Male Artist of the Year, Ensemble of the Year, Debut Album of the Year, Jazz Album of the Year, Ethno/Folk/Popular Album of the Year, Electronic Album of the Year, Alternative/Indie Album of the Year, Metal Album of the Year, Rock Album of the Year, Pop Album of the Year, Hip-Hop/Rap Album of the Year, Classical Album of the Year (Sub categories: Composition Album of the Year, Chamber Music Albums of the Year, Choral Music Album of the Year, Symphonic or Stage Music Album of the Year), Music Video of the Year, Best Song of the Year, Contribution to Estonian Music.

=== 2019 ===
On January 24, the Estonian Music Awards 2019 were presented at Saku Suurhall. The evening was hosted by singer Triinu “Lepatriinu” Paomets and musician Reigo Ahven. The biggest winner of the evening was Ewert and The Two Dragons, who won in all three categories in which they were nominated. The musicians who performed at the gala included Kare Kauksi in the Mahavok lineup, NOËP, and a joint number by Bert on Beats and the ÖED ensemble. Notable moments include the performance of Rein Rannap and Ott Lepland together with the WAF Choir, and the Revals. In addition, Uudo Sepp, Maian, Lenna, Ewert and The Two Dragons, Duo Ruut, Talbot, Victor Crone and The Boondocks also performed. The event was broadcast live by Kanal2, Kanal11, Elmar and Elu24.

A total of 17 categories were awarded: Jazz Album of the Year, Ethno/Folk/Popular Album of the Year, Electronic Album of the Year, Alternative/Indie Album of the Year, Metal Album of the Year, Rock Album of the Year, Pop Album of the Year, Hip-Hop/Rap Album of the Year, Debut Album of the Year, Female Artist of the Year, Male Artist of the Year, Band of the Year, Music Video of the Year, Best Song of the Year, Album of the Year, Classical Album of the Year, Contribution to Estonian Music.

=== 2020 ===
Anna Kaneelina and nublu received the most awards at the Estonian Music Awards 2020 gala held at Saku Suurhall on January 24. The winners of the Estonian Music Awards were determined by a jury of nearly 160 members convened by the Estonian Phonogram Producers Association. The Artist of the Year was determined in a public vote conducted by Elu24 and the Estonian Music Awards. At the biggest music gala yet, 20 artists performed. These included the world premieres of Trad.Attack!'s new single "Tehke ruumi", Ariadne's new single "Queen Of My Own" and British rising star CHINCHILLA's new single "Cold Water". In addition, The Swingers performed a memorable pop song from the top five Estonian songs of the year and gave the show a 5MIINUST score with villemdrillem. The ensemble FIX was also seen on the gala stage. In addition, STEFAN, Liis Lemsalu, Anna Kaneelina, Rita Ray, Gram-of-Fun, Clicherik & Mäx, nublu and Isac Elliot performed special numbers. The evening was hosted by Trad.Attack!. The event was broadcast live by Kanal 11, Kanal 2, Elmar and Elu24.

Awards were given out in a total of 18 categories: Debut Album of the Year, Jazz Album of the Year, Ethno/Folk/Popular Album of the Year, Electronic Album of the Year, Alternative/Indie Album of the Year, Metal Album of the Year, Rock Album of the Year, Pop Artist of the Year, Hip-Hop/Rap/R'n'B Artist of the Year, Female Artist of the Year, Male Artist of the Year, Ensemble of the Year, Artist of the Year, Music Video of the Year, Best Song of the Year, Album of the Year, Classical Album of the Year (Sub-categories: Composition Album of the Year, Symphonic or Stage Music Album of the Year, Choral Music Album of the Year, Chamber Music Album of the Year), Contribution to Estonian Music.

=== 2021 ===
At the Estonian Music Awards 2021 gala held on January 28, nublu received the most awards, winning six awards, including Debut Album of the Year, Hip-Hop/Rap/R'n'B Artist of the Year, Male Artist of the Year, Music Video of the Year, Artist of the Year, and Album of the Year. The Music Video of the Year win came for the song "Universum", which was made in collaboration with Mikael Gabriel and director Marta Vaarik. "Café Kosmos" was chosen as Album of the Year. Both Trad.Attack! and Anett were awarded two awards. The Best Song of the Year went to Trad.Attack! “Armasta mind” (feat. Vaiko Eplik), and the band also won in the Ethno/Folk Album of the Year category. Anett was awarded the titles of Female Artist of the Year and Pop Artist of the Year. Over 150 jury members participated in selecting the winners. The Artist of the Year was determined as a result of a public vote conducted in cooperation with Elu24. Traditionally, the Contribution to Estonian Music award was also presented, which was received by the ensemble Ruja. Hosts Kaire Vilgats and Dagmar Oja performed an opening number from the Best Song of the Year nominees with Utopia Entertainment dancers and the Police and Border Guard Orchestra conducted by Siim Aimla. The gala evening also featured musical performances by Terminaator, 5MIINUST, pizza, nublu, Miljardid, Anett, Raul Ojamaa and NOËP. The event was broadcast live by Kanal 2 and Elu24.

Awards were given out in a total of 19 categories: Debut Album of the Year, Jazz Album of the Year, Etno/Folk Album of the Year, Song of the Year/Folk Album, Alternative/Indie Album of the Year, Metal Album of the Year, Rock Album of the Year, Electronic Album of the Year, Pop Artist of the Year, Hip-Hop/Rap/R'n'B Artist of the Year, Female Artist of the Year, Male Artist of the Year, Band of the Year, Artist of the Year, Music Video of the Year, Best Song of the Year, Album of the Year, Classical Album of the Year (Sub-categories: Chamber Music Album of the Year, Composition Album of the Year, Symphonic or Stage Music Album of the Year, Choral Music Album of the Year), Contribution to Estonian Music.

=== 2022 ===
NOËP and Puuluup took home the most awards at the Estonian Music Awards 2022 gala held at the Alexela Concert Hall on 26.01.2022. NOËP, who received four awards, was victorious in the categories of Male Artist of the Year and Pop Artist of the Year, as well as in the categories of Debut Album of the Year and Album of the Year. The ensemble Puuluup was awarded two awards, winning in the categories of Band of the Year and Ethno/Folk Album of the Year. Singer YASMYN was awarded Female Artist of the Year. Tommy Cash won the Best Music Video award. A total of 190 jury members participated in selecting the winners. In addition, the Artist of the Year award was also presented, chosen by Kroonika readers – the winner was the band 5MIINUST. Continuing the tradition, the Contribution to Estonian Music Award was also presented, which was awarded to composer Mikk Targo. The event was broadcast live by Kanal 2, and for the first time, the show was also available to watch as an alternative online broadcast via the Elisa Stage platform. The gala evening was hosted by Liis Lemsalu and Daniel Levi Viinalass, who also performed an opening number. The performers at the gala were NOËP, 5MIINUST, Puuluup, Wateva, Genka, YASMYN and Gameboy Tetris. The performers were accompanied on stage by ÜENSO conductors Tõnno Piigli and Jüri-Ruut Kangur.

Awards were given out in a total of 19 categories: Debut Album of the Year, Jazz Album of the Year, Ethno/Folk Album of the Year, Song of the Year/Folk Album, Alternative/Indie Album of the Year, Metal Album of the Year, Rock Album of the Year, Electronic Album of the Year, Hip-Hop/Rap/R'n'B Artist of the Year, Pop Artist of the Year, Female Artist of the Year, Male Artist of the Year, Ensemble of the Year, Artist of the Year, Music Video of the Year, Song of the Year, Album of the Year, Classical Album of the Year (Sub-categories: Chamber Music Album of the Year, Composition Album of the Year, Choir Music Album of the Year, Symphonic or Stage Music Album of the Year), Contribution to Estonian Music.

=== 2023 ===
At the Estonian Music Awards 2023 gala at the Unibet Arena, STEFAN picked up the most awards, winning a total of four titles in the categories of Artist of the Year, Male Artist of the Year, Pop Artist of the Year, and Song of the Year. This year, the awards for Band of the Year and Debut Album of the Year went to Gram-Of-Fun, and Rita Ray was named Female Artist of the Year and won the Album of the Year award. The award for best music video went to nublu for the song "kastehein". This year, the Soul/Funk/R'n'B artist of the year was chosen for the first time, and Anett won with her album "Late to the Party". Nearly 200 jury members participated in selecting the winners. The winner of the Artist of the Year award was determined by a public vote on the Sky.ee portal, and STEFAN was chosen. The legendary Rock Hotel, whose music was performed on stage by Siim Aimla, Maarja, Tanel Padar, Ott Lepland, Robert Linna, Jaak Vasar, Eduard Akulin, Andrus Lillepea, Eric Kammiste, Joonas Mattias Sarapuu and Henno Kelp, was recognized for its contribution to Estonian music. The gala evening was hosted by 5MIINUST, who performed an opening number. The gala featured performances by nublu, Anett, Elephants From Neptune, STEFAN, Rita Ray and Gram-Of-Fun.

Awards were given out in a total of 20 categories: Debut Album of the Year, Alternative/Indie Album of the Year, Songwriter's Album of the Year, Electronic Album of the Year, Ethno/Folk/Popular Album of the Year, Hip-Hop/Rap Artist of the Year, Jazz Album of the Year, Metal Album of the Year, Rock Album of the Year, Pop Artist of the Year, Soul/Funk/R'n'B Artist of the Year, Female Artist of the Year, Male Artist of the Year, Band of the Year, Artist of the Year, Music Video of the Year, Song of the Year, Album of the Year, Classical Album of the Year (Sub-categories: Symphonic or Stage Music Album of the Year, Composition Album of the Year, Chamber Music Album of the Year, Choir Music Album of the Year), Contribution to Estonian Music.

=== 2024 ===
At the grand gala of the Estonian Music Awards 2024 at the Unibet Arena, ALIKA was the overwhelming winner, winning a total of five titles in the categories of Artist of the Year, Female Artist of the Year, Album of the Year, Debut Album of the Year, and Song of the Year. Bedwetters won three awards – Band of the Year, Rock Album of the Year and Music Video of the Year. NOËP was named both Male Artist of the Year and Pop Artist of the Year. 160 jury members participated in selecting the winners. The winner of the Artist of the Year award was determined by a public vote on the Sky.ee portal, and ALIKA was chosen. The award for Contribution to Estonian Music was given to pop music great, singer Marju Länik. The gala evening was hosted by Birgit Sarrap and STEFAN, who opened the evening with a performance. Performers included ALIKA, Bedwetters, NOËP, villemdrillem, Anett x Fredi, MARI KALKUN and Marju Länik. The live broadcast was on Kanal 2 and a special web program was broadcast on Delfi.

Awards were given out in a total of 20 categories: Debut Album of the Year, Alternative/Indie Album of the Year, Songwriter's Album of the Year, Electronic Album of the Year, Ethno/Folk/Popular Album of the Year, Hip-Hop/Rap Artist of the Year, Soul/Funk/R'n'B Artist of the Year, Jazz Album of the Year, Metal Album of the Year, Rock Album of the Year, Pop Artist of the Year, Female Artist of the Year, Male Artist of the Year, Ensemble of the Year, Artist of the Year, Music Video of the Year, Song of the Year, Album of the Year, Classical Album of the Year (Sub-categories: Solo or Chamber Music Album of the Year, Estonian Composition Album of the Year, Choral Music Album of the Year, Symphonic or Stage Music Album of the Year), Contribution to Estonian Music.

=== 2025 ===
The Estonian Music Awards 2025 grand gala at the Unibet Arena was won by 5MIINUST x Puuluup and nublu, who were both awarded a total of three titles. 5MIINUST x Puuluup took home the titles Album of the Year, Band of the Year and Ethno/Folk/Popular Album of the Year. Pop Artist of the Year nublu also won the Song of the Year and Music Video of the Year categories with the song "push it" featuring maria kallastu. Mari Jürjens was awarded both Female Artist of the Year and Original Song Album of the Year. Florian Wahl received Male Artist of the Year and Alternative/Indie Album of the Year awards.The winners of the Estonian Music Awards were selected by a 159-member jury. The Music Video of the Year was determined by a public vote on the Delfi portal. The Contribution to Estonian Music award went to pop music hitmaker, songwriter, producer and musician Sven Lõhmus. The gala evening was hosted by Anne Veski and the Bedwetters ensemble, who opened the evening with a special number. The performers were 5MIINUST x Puuluup, nublu and maria kallastu, Mari Jürjens, Vaiko Eplik & Eliit, Florian Wahl, villemdrillem and JT Conception, among others. The live broadcast was via Kanal 2 and a special web program was broadcast on Delfi.

Awards were given out in a total of 18 categories: Debut Album of the Year, Alternative/Indie Album of the Year, Songwriter's Album of the Year, Electronic Album of the Year, Ethno/Folk/Popular Album of the Year, Hip-Hop/Rap Artist of the Year, Jazz Album of the Year, Classical Album of the Year (Sub-categories: Solo or Chamber Music Album of the Year, Estonian Composition Album of the Year, Choral Music Album of the Year, Symphonic or Stage Music Album of the Year), Metal Album of the Year, Pop Artist of the Year, Rock Album of the Year, Female Artist of the Year, Male Artist of the Year, Music Video of the Year, Ensemble of the Year, Song of the Year, Album of the Year, Contribution to Estonian Music.

== Winners ==
=== General Field Awards ===
==== Female Artist of the Year (1998, Since 2000) ====
Year	Winner (Artist)	Album	Ref
1998	Maarja	Kaua veel	
2000	Ines	Here For Your Love	
2001	Hedvig Hanson	Tule mu juurde	
2003	Liisi Koikson	The Gemini Diaries	
2004	Hedvig Hanson	What Colour Is Love?	
2005	Ines	15 magamata ööd	
2006	Liisi Koikson	Väike Järv	
2007	Maarja and Rannap	Läbi jäätund klaasi	
2008	Laura	Muusa	
2009	Kerli	Love is dead	
2010	Birgit Õigemeel	Teineteisel pool	
2011	Lenna	Lenna	
2012	Liis Lemsalu	Liis Lemsalu	
2013	Iiris	The Magic Gift Box	
2014	Birgit Õigemeel	Uus algus	
2015	Maria Minerva	Histrionic	
2016	Elina Born	Elina Born	
2017	Kadri Voorand	Armupurjus (esitab Kadri Voorand Quartet)	
2018	Liis Lemsalu	+1	
2019	Lenna		
2020	Anna Kaneelina	Anna Kaneelina	
2021	Anett	Morning After	
2022	YASMYN	YASMYN	
2023	Rita Ray	A Life of Its Own	
2024	ALIKA	ALIKA	
2025	Mari Jürjens	… aga samas …	

==== Male Artist of the Year (Since 1998) ====
Year	Winner (Artist)	Album	Ref
1998	Mati Nuude	Kutse tantsule nr. 8: Tulipunased roosid	
1999	Mati Nuude	Kutse tantsule nr. 14: Viva šampanja	
2000	Riho Sibul	Poeet külmetab klaasmäel	
2001	Dave Benton	From Monday to Sunday	
2003	Karl Madis	Tantsud vihmas	
2004	Chalice	Ühendatud inimesed	
2005	Cool D	Seenioride vabakava	
2006	Cool D	Tütar üksi kodus	
2007	Allan Vainola	Unenäopüüdjad	
2008	Chalice	Taevas ja perse	
2009	Chalice	Supervõimed	
2010	Vaiko Eplik	Neljas	
2011	Orelipoiss	Õnn	
2012	Ott Lepland	Laulan ma sind	
2013	Ott Lepland	Öö mu kannul käib	
2014	Leslie Da Bass	Times New Roman	
2015	Karl-Erik Taukar	Vääramatu jõud	
2016	Jüri Pootsmann	Jüri Pootsmann	
2017	Karl-Erik Taukar	Kaks	
2018	Erki Pärnoja	Efterglow	
2019	nublu		
2020	nublu		
2021	nublu	Café Kosmos	
2022	NOËP	No Man Is An Island	
2023	STEFAN	Hope	
2024	NOËP	Move Your Feet	
2025	Karl Killing	37	

==== Ensemble of the Year (Since 1998) ====
Year	Winner (Artist)	Album	Ref
1998	Terminaator	Kuld	
1999	Caater	Millennium: The Best of Caater Aasta Raadiohitt 2 Quick Start C’est La Vie	
2000	Claire's Birthday	Venus	
2001	2 Quick Start	Ühega miljoneist	
2003	Dagö	Toiduklubi	
2004	Dagö	Hiired tuules	
2005	Toe Tag	Legendaarne	
2006	Tanel Padar & The Sun	The Greatest Hits	
2007	Tanel Padar & The Sun	100% rock’n’roll	
2008	Vaiko Eplik & Eliit	Vaiko Eplik & Eliit 2	
2009	HU?	Film	
2010	Popidiot	Antenna of Love	
2011	Ultima Thule	Jälgede jälgedes	
2012	Ewert and The Two Dragons	Good Man Down	
2013	Põhja-Tallinn	Per Aspera ad Astra	
2014	Kõrsikud	Heli jälgedes	
2015	Curly Strings	Üle ilma	
2016	Trad.Attack!	Ah!	
2017	Elephants From Neptune	Oh No	
2018	Trad.Attack!	Kullakarva	
2019	Ewert and The Two Dragons		
2020	Põhja Konn, Vox Clamantis, Estonian Cello Ensemble	Hetk. InSpereiritud Tüürist	
2021	Lexsoul Dancemachine	Lexplosion II	
2022	Puuluup	Viimane suusataja	
2023	Gram-Of-Fun	To The Great Unknown	
2024	Bedwetters	It Is What It Is	
2025	5MIINUST x Puuluup	kannatused ehk külakiigel pole stopperit	

==== Album of the Year (1998–1999, Since 2005) ====
Year	Winner (Album)	Artist	Ref
1998	Kuld	Terminaator	
1999	Millennium: The Best of Caater	Caater	
2005	15 magamata ööd	Ines	
2006	The Greatest Hits	Tanel Padar & The Sun	
2007	100% rock’n’roll	Tanel Padar & The Sun	
2008	Muusa	Laura	
2009	Film	HU?	
2010	Ringrada	Röövel Ööbik	
2011	Jälgede jälgedes	Ultima Thule	
2012	Good Man Down	Ewert and The Two Dragons	
2013	6 Varielu	Vaiko Eplik	
2014	Teine	Lenna	
2015	Üle ilma	Curly Strings	
2016	Ah!	Trad.Attack!	
2017	Kaks	Karl-Erik Taukar	
2018	Kunagi läänes	Miljardid	
2019	Hands Around the Moon	Ewert and The Two Dragons	
2020	Anna Kaneelina	Anna Kaneelina	
2021	Café Kosmos	nublu	
2022	No Man Is An Island	NOËP	
2023	A Life of Its Own	Rita Ray	
2024	ALIKA	ALIKA	
2025	kannatused ehk külakiigel pole stopperit	5MIINUST x Puuluup	

==== Debut Album of the Year (1998–2001, Since 2011) ====
Replaced by Newcomer of the Year in 2003-2010

Year	Winner (Album)	Artist	Ref
1998	Puudutus: Duetid	Koit Toome	
1999	Geisha	Push Up	
2000	Venus	Claire's Birthday	
2001	Woman Knows	Tanel Padar & Speed Free	
2011	Lenna	Lenna	
2012	Wide awake	Outloudz	
2013	Per Aspera ad Astra	Põhja-Tallinn	
2014	Facelift Deer	Facelift Deer	
2015	Üle ilma	Curly Strings	
2016	Elina Born	Elina Born	
2017	Patience	I Wear* Experiment	
2018	Kunagi läänes	Miljardid	
2019	TIKS 068	Sander Mölder	
2020	Anna Kaneelina	Anna Kaneelina	
2021	Café Kosmos	nublu	
2022	No Man Is An Island	NOËP	
2023	To The Great Unknown	Gram-Of-Fun	
2024	ALIKA	ALIKA	
2025	37	Karl Killing	

==== Music Video of the Year (Since 1998) ====
Year	Winner (Music Video)	Artist	Director	Ref
1998	Kas sa kuuled?	Cool D	Masa	
1999	Diamond of Night	Evelin Samuel & Camille	Rando Pettai	
2000	Haiguste vältimine nende ennetamise teel	Genialistid	Ene Jakobi	
2001	Chillout Squad	BetoonKing	Ants-Martin Vahur	
2003	Over The Water Blue	Alternature	Rando Pettai	
2004	Tere Kertu	Chupacabra	Markko Karu	
2005	Gde respect?	Skazo	Masa	
2006	Pankrot	Toe Tag	Masa	
2007	Aitäh elu eest	Cool D		
2008	That Dance	Under Marie		
2009	Walking on air	Kerli		
2010	Hanging on Friday	Popidiot		
2011	Tea Party	Kerli		
2012	Good Man Down	Ewert and The Two Dragons		
2013	Zero Gravity	Kerli		
2014	Tigerhead	Iiris		
2015	Kuukene	Trad.Attack!	Martti Helde	
2016	Segased lood	Karl-Erik Taukar	Carolyn Niitla, Karel Otstavel, Fred Krieger	
2017	Winaloto	Tommy Cash	Tomas Tammemets	
2018	Surf	Tommy Cash	Tomas Tammemets	
2019	LITTLE MOLLY	Tommy Cash	Tommy Cash and Anna-Lisa Himma	
2020	für Oksana	nublu x gameboy tetris	Marta Vaarik	
2021	Universum	nublu x Mikael Gabriel	Marta Vaarik	
2022	Racked	Tommy Cash	Anna Himma	
2023	kastehein	nublu	Johannes Veski	
2024	Monsters	Bedwetters		
2025	push it	nublu feat. maria kallastu	Johannes Magnus Aule	

==== Record Company of the Year (1998–2000) ====
Year	Winner	Ref
1998	Aidem Pot	
1999	Hitivabrik	
2000	Records 2000	

==== Radio Hit of the Year (1998–2001) ====
Replaced by Hit Song of the Year in 2003

Year	Winner (Song)	Artist	Ref
1998	Tantsin sinuga taevas	Smilers	
1999	C’est La Vie	2 Quick Start	
2000	Once in a Lifetime	Ines	
2001	Ühega miljoneist	2 Quick Start	

==== Contribution to Estonia Music (Since 1999) ====
Year	Winner	Ref
1999	Uno Loop	
2000	Valter Ojakaär	
2001	Vello Orumets	
2003	Rein Rannap	
2004	Gunnar Graps	
2005	Tonis Mägi	
2006	Marju Kuut	
2007	Olav Ehala	
2008	Ivo Linna	
2009	Riho Onion	
2010	Erkki-Sven Tüür	
2011	Singer Vinger	
2012	Kukerpillid	
2013	Anne Erm	
2014	Anne Veski	
2015	Jaak Joala	
2016	Justament	
2017	Villu Tamme	
2018	2 Quick Start	
2019	Mahavok	
2020	FIX	
2021	Ruja	
2022	Mikk Targo	
2023	Rock Hotel	
2024	Marju Lanik	
2025	Sven Løhmus	

==== Album Design of the Year (1999–2001, 2003–2008, 2014) ====
Year	Winner (Album)	Artist	Designers	Ref
1999	Sit and Spin	Mr. Lawrence	Ervin Heigo Seppel Herkki-Erich Merila	
2000	Müsteerium plaadimängijas	Various Artists		
2001	Patused mõtted	INBoiler	Asko Künnap / Zoom	
2001	Niiongi	Jääboiler	Asko Künnap / Zoom	
2003	Sabaga täht	Eesti Keeled ja Jaak Johanson, Riho Sibul	Martin Pütsep	
2004	Kohtumine Albertiga	Urmas Alender	Heino Prunsvelt	
2005	Tsaca Tsap	Pastacas		
2006	Sula	NYYD Ensemble ja ERSO, Helena Tulve	Tuuli Aule	
2007	Telegramm	Köök		
2008	Ei tea, kumb?	Indigolapsed		
2014	Yaki-Läki	Pastacas		

==== Music Supporter of the Year (2000) ====
Year	Winner	Ref
2000	Peep Sooman	

==== Artist of the Year (2001–2006, 2020–2024) ====
Year	Artist	Ref
2001	Terminaator	
2003	Our Man	
2004	Smilers	
2005	Smilers	
2006	Slide-Fifty	
2020	5MIINUST	
2021	nublu	
2022	5MIINUST	
2023	STEFAN	
2024	ALIKA	

==== Hit Song of the Year (2003–2008) ====
Replaced by "Song of the Year" in 2011

Year	Winner (Song)	Artist	Ref
2003	Unistus/ As My Life Goes On	Tanel Padar	
2004	Leekiv armastus	Genialistid ja Lea Liitmaa	
2005	15 magamata ööd	Ines	
2006	Kuu on päike	Tanel Padar & The Sun	
2007	Kosk	Vaiko Eplik ja Eliit	
2008	Absoluutselt	Hannaliisa Uusma	

==== Newcomer of the Year (2003–2010) ====
Replaced by Debut Album of the Year in 2011

Year	Winner (Artist)	Album	Ref
2003	Liisi Koikson	The Gemini Diaries	
2004	Chalice	Ühendatud inimesed	
2005	Koer	Pure	
2006	Tanel Padar & The Sun	The Greatest Hits	
2007	Mari-Leen	Rahutu tuhkatriinu	
2008	Traffic	Traffic	
2009	HU?	Film	
2010	Chungin & The Strap-On Faggots	Chungin & The Strap-On Faggots	

==== Foreign Artist of the Year (2003) ====
Year	Artist	Ref
2003	Eminem	

==== People's Choice of the Year (2009–2010) ====
This award was named "Audience Favorite" in 2010.

Year	Artist	Album	Ref
2009	Tanel Padar & The Sun	Unisex	
2010	Shanon		

==== Song of the Year (Since 2011) ====
From 2011-2021, this award was named "Best Song of the Year"

Year	Winner (Song)	Artist	Ref
2011	Rapunzel	Lenna	
2012	Good Man Down	Ewert and The Two Dragons	
2013	Mina jään	Lenna	
2014	Meiecundimees üks Korsakov läks eile Lätti	Winny Puhh	
2015	Kauges külas	Curly Strings	
2016	Goodbye to Yesterday	Elina Born & Stig Rästa	
2017	Rooftop	NOËP	
2018	Kiki Miki	Arop	
2019	Mina ka	nublu feat. reket	
2020	für Oksana	nublu x gameboy tetris	
2021	Armasta mind (feat. Vaiko Eplik)	Trad.Attack!	
2022	Love Ain’t The Same	Rita Ray	
2023	Hope	STEFAN	
2024	Bridges	ALIKA	
2025	push it	nublu feat. maria kallastu	

==== Songwriter's Album of the Year (Since 2023) ====
Year	Winner (Album)	Artist	Ref
2023	Tapeet	Lonitseera	
2024	Klišeed	Vaiko Eplik	
2025	… aga samas …	Mari Jürjens	

=== Jazz/Blues Awards & Winners ===
The Jazz/Blues genre was introduced in 2000.

==== Jazz/Blues Artist of the Year (2000–2002, 2003–2011) ====
Replaced by Jazz Album of the Year in 2012

Year	Winner (Artist)	Album	Ref
2000	Riho Sibul	Poeet külmetab klaasmäel	
2001	Hedvig Hanson	Tule mu juurde	
2003	Riho Sibul & Estonian Dream Big Band	Riho Sibul & Estonian Dream Big Band	
2004	Hedvig Hanson	What Colour Is Love?	
2005	Riho Sibul	Must	
2006	Liisi Koikson	Väike Järv	
2007	Toomas Rull	Going North	
2008	Villu Veski	iLife Jazz Party	
2009	Hedvig Hanson	Kohtumistund	
2010	Riho Sibul	Liblikas ja peegel	
2011	Liisi Koikson	Ettepoole	

==== Jazz Album of the Year (Since 2012) ====
Year	Winner (Album)	Artist	Ref
2012	Kooskõla	Vaiko Eplik ja Kristjan Randalu	
2013	A Tempo	Mustonen Sooäär Remmel Ruben	
2014	Esmahetked	Hedvig Hanson	
2015	Ole hea	Estonian Voices	
2016	In The Land Of OO-BLA-DEE	Sofia Rubina	
2017	Armupurjus	Kadri Voorand Quartet	
2018	Remember	Reigo Ahven Trio	
2019	Taat läks lolliks	Estonian Voices	
2020	In Duo with Mihkel Mälgand	Kadri Voorand	
2021	ORGAN	Maria Faust Sacrum Facere	
2022	Kevad	Joel Remmel Trio	
2023	Sisu	Kristjan Randalu, New Wind Jazz Orchestra	
2024	Ambivalence	Karmen Rõivassepp & Aarhus Jazz Orchestra	
2025	Kallimale	Estonian Voices	

=== Ethno/Folk Awards & Winners ===
The Ethno/Folk genre was introduced in 2000.

==== Ethno/Folk Artist of the Year (2000–2001, 2003–2011) ====
Replaced by Ethno/Folk Album of the Year in 2012

Year	Winner (Artist)	Album	Ref
2000	Dago	Dago	
2001	Jaan Tätte	Minemine	
2003	Eesti Keeled ja Jaak Johanson, Riho Sibul	Sabaga täht	
2004	Maian Kärmas	Tuigutuled	
2005	Eesti Keeled	Kella tiksumist…	
2006	Jäääär	Juubelplaat: ei Üle ega Ümber	
2007	Diskreetse Mango Trio	Prigadi-pragadi	
2008	Orelipoiss	Üheksakümmend üheksa	
2009	Zetod	Lätsi tarrõ tagasi	
2010	Jaan Tätte	Tulemine	
2011	Orelipoiss	Õnn	

==== Ethno/Folk Album of the Year (2012–2014, 2021–2022) ====
Year	Winner (Album)	Artist	Ref
2012	Meie küla laulud	Kukerpillid, Mari Pokinen, Hendrik Sal-Saller	
2013	Ilus ja kole	Orelipoiss	
2014	Lätsi kõrtsu	Zetod	
2021	Make Your Move	Trad.Attack!	
2022	Viimane suusataja	Puuluup	

==== Song of the Year/Folk Album (2014, 2021–2022) ====
In 2014, this award was named "Folk Album of the Year"

Year	Winner (Album/Song)	Artist	Ref
2014	Sinu südames	Kõrsikud	
2021	Omaenese ilus ja veas	Mari Jürjens	
2022	Sisemeri silmini	Jaak Johanson	

==== Ethno/Folk/Popular Album of the Year (2012–2020, 2023–Current) ====
Prior to 2015, this award was named Ethno/Folk Album of the Year

Year	Winner (Album)	Artist	Ref
2015	Trad.Attack!	Trad.Attack!	
2016	Ah!	Trad.Attack!	
2017	Une meeles	Maarja Nuut	
2018	Kullakarva	Trad.Attack!	
2019	Süüta mu lumi	Puuluup	
2020	Ayibobo	Black Bread Gone Mad	
2023	Akadeemia	KukerPillid	
2024	STOONIA LOOD	MARI KALKUN	
2025	kannatused ehk külakiigel pole stopperit	5MIINUST x Puuluup	

=== Classical Awards & Winners ===
The Classical genre was introduced in 2000.

==== Classical Artist of the Year (2000–2001, 2004) ====
Year	Winner (Artist)	Album	Ref
2000	Heiki Mätlik, Terje Terasmaa, Arvo Leibur	Tango King Astor Piazzolla	
2001	NYYD Ensemble	Nüüd	
2004	Hortus Musicus	Estonian Composers III	

==== Classical Album of the Year (2003, 2005–2006, Since 2014) ====
Year	Winner (Album)	Composer	Performed By	Ref
2003	Sabbatum	Various	Rondellus	
2005	be lost in the Call	Various	NYYD Ensemble	
2006	Sula	Helena Tulve	NYYD Ensemble ja ERSO	
2014	Vivit!	Max Regeri, Rudolf Tobiase	Estonian Philharmonic Chamber Choir	
2015	In paradisum	Galina Grigorjeva	Estonian National Male Choir, conductor Mikk Üleoja. Soloists: Allar Kaasik, Aleksandr Mihhailov, Margus Vellmann, Aleksander Arder, Valter Soosalu	
2016	sooloalbum	George Enescu, Béla Bartók, Erkki-Sven Tüür, Tõnu Kõrvits	Mihkel Poll (piano)	
2017	The Deer's Cry	Arvo Pärt	Vox Clamantis, Toomas Vavilov (clarinet), Heikko Remmel, Taavo Remmel (double basses), Robert Staak (lute), Mari Poll (violin), Johanna Vahermägi (viola), Susanne Doll (organ), conductor Jaan-Eik Tulve	
2018	Moorland elegies	Tõnu Kõrvits	Estonian Philharmonic Chamber Choir, Tallinn Chamber Orchestra, soloists Marianne Pärna, Jaanika Kilgi, conductor Risto Joost	
2019	Illuminatio. Whistles and Whispers from Uluru. Symphony No. 8	Erkki-Sven Tüür	Lawrence Power (viola), Genevieve Lacey (recorder), Tapiola Sinfonietta, conductor Olari Elts	
2020	Sümfoonilised poeemid	Heino Eller	Estonian National Symphony Orchestra, conductor Olari Elts	
2021	Lost Prayers	Erkki-Sven Tüür	Harry Traksmann, Leho Karin, Marrit Gerretz-Traksmann, Florian Donderer, Tanja Tetzlaff, Signum Quartett	
2022	Strings Attached: The Voice of Kannel	Various	Anna-Liisa Eller	
2023	Estonian Premieres	Various	Estonian Festival Orchestra, conductor Paavo Järvi	
2024	Complete Piano Music, Volume Nine	Heino Eller	Sten Lassmann	
2025	Ship of Fools	Jüri Reinvere	Estonian Festival Orchestra, conductor Paavo Järvi, soloists Maarika Järvi, Monika Mattiesen	

==== Estonian Composition Album of the Year (2017–2018, Since 2020) ====
From 2017-2023, this award was named "Composition Album of the Year"

Year	Winner (Album)	Composer	Performed By	Ref
2017	The Deer's Cry	Arvo Pärt	Vox Clamantis, Toomas Vavilov (clarinet), Heikko Remmel, Taavo Remmel (double basses), Robert Staak (lute), Mari Poll (violin), Johanna Vahermägi (viola), Susanne Doll (organ), conductor Jaan-Eik Tulve	
2018	Moorland elegies	Tõnu Kõrvits	Estonian Philharmonic Chamber Choir, Tallinn Chamber Orchestra, soloists Marianne Pärna, Jaanika Kilgi, conductor Risto Joost	
2020	Sümfoonilised poeemid	Heino Eller	Estonian National Symphony Orchestra, conductor Olari Elts	
2021	You are Light and Morning	Tõnu Kõrvits	Estonian Philharmonic Chamber Choir, Tallinn Chamber Orchestra, conductor Risto Joost	
2022	Complete Piano Music. Volume Seven	Heino Eller	Sten Lassmann	
2023	Mass of Mary	Maria Faust	Chamber Choir Collegium Musicale, conductor Endrik Üksvärav	
2024	The Sound of Wings	Tõnu Kõrvits	Estonian Philharmonic Chamber Choir, Tallinn Chamber Orchestra, conductor Risto Joost	
2025	Ship of Fools	Jüri Reinvere	Estonian Festival Orchestra, conductor Paavo Järvi, soloists Maarika Järvi, Monika Mattiesen	

==== Solo or Chamber Music Album of the Year (2017–2018, Since 2020) ====
From 2017-2023, this award was named "Chamber Music Album of the Year"

Year	Winner (Album)	Composer	Performed by	Ref
2017	String Quartets	Heino Eller	Tallinn String Quartet (Urmas Vulp, Olga Voronova, Toomas Nestor, Levi-Daniel Mägila)	
2017	Mirror	Tõnu Kõrvits	Anja Lechner (cello), Kadri Voorand (voice), Tõnu Kõrvits (kannel), Tallinn Chamber Orchestra, Estonian Philharmonic Chamber Choir, conductor Tõnu Kaljuste	
2018	Works for violin and piano	George Enescu, Francis Poulenc, Arnold Schönberg, Erkki-Sven Tüür	Mari Poll (violin), Mihkel Poll (piano)	
2020	Virmalised. Eesti klaverimuusika läbi sajandi	Various	Mihekel Poll, Age Juurikas, Irina Zahharenkova, Sten Lassmann, Marko Martin jt.	
2021	Lost Prayers	Erkki-Sven Tüür	Harry Traksmann, Leho Karin, Marrit Gerretz-Traksmann, Florian Donderer, Tanja Tetzlaff, Signum Quartett	
2022	Strings Attached: The Voice of Kannel	Various	Anna-Liisa Eller	
2023	Flow Line	Various	Ensemble Una Corda	
2024	Complete Piano Music, Volume Nine	Heino Eller	Sten Lassmann	
2025	Tallinn Cathedral Organ	Aare-Paul Lattik	Aare-Paul Lattik	

==== Choral Music Album of the Year (2017–2018, Since 2020) ====
Renamed Choir Music Album of the Year in 2022-2023

Year	Winner (Album)	Composer	Performed by	Ref
2017	The Deer's Cry	Arvo Pärt	Vox Clamantis, Toomas Vavilov (clarinet), Heikko Remmel, Taavo Remmel (double basses), Robert Staak (lute), Mari Poll (violin), Johanna Vahermägi (viola), Susanne Doll (organ), conductor Jaan-Eik Tulve	
2018	Moorland elegies	Tõnu Kõrvits	Estonian Philharmonic Chamber Choir, Tallinn Chamber Orchestra, soloists Marianne Pärna, Jaanika Kilgi, conductor Risto Joost	
2020	Liszt: Via crucis, S. 53 - Pärt: Sacred Choral Works	Arvo Pärt, Ferenc Liszt	Estonian Philharmonic Chamber Choir, conductor Kaspars Putniņš, Kalle Randalu (piano)	
2021	The Suspended Harp of Babel	Cyrillus Kreek	Vox Clamantis, Jaan-Eik Tulve, Anna-Liisa Eller, Angela Ambrosini, Marco Ambrosini	
2022	Choir Concerto, Three Sacred Hymns - Seven Magnificat-Antiphons	Alfred Schnittke, Arvo Pärt	Estonian Philharmonic Chamber Choir, conductor Kaspars Putniņš	
2023	Liturgy of St John Chrysostom	Rachmaninov	Estonian Philharmonic Chamber Choir, conductor Kaspars Putniņš	
2024	Music by Henrik Ødegaard	Henrik Ødegaard	Vox Clamantis, conductor Jaan-Eik Tulve	
2025	Shostakovich Symphony No.13. - Pärt: De profundis	Dmitri Shostakovich and Arvo Pärt	Estonian National Male Choir, artistic director Mikk Üleoja, BBC Philharmonic, conductor John Storgårds, soloist Albert Dohmen	

==== Orchestral or Stage Music Album of the Year (2017–2018, 2020–Current) ====
From 2017 to 2024, this award was named "Symphonic or Stage Music Album of the Year"

Year	Winner (Album)	Composer	Performed by	Ref
2017	Great Maestros. I-V.	Ludwig van Beethoven, Johannes Brahms, Richard Strauss	Kalle Randalu (piano), Estonian National Symphony Orchestra, conductor Neeme Järvi	
2018	Concertos for oboe and oboe d´amore	Antonio Vivaldi, Alessandro Marcello, Georg Philipp Telemann, Johann Sebastian Bach	Kalev Kuljus (oboe), Lithuanian Chamber Orchestra	
2020	Sümfoonilised poeemid	Heino Eller	Estonian National Symphony Orchestra, conductor Olari Elts	
2021	Elgar. Violin Concerto. Stenhammar. Two Sentimental Romances	Edward Elgar & Wilhelm Stenhammar	Triin Ruubel, Estonian National Symphony Orchestra, conductor Neeme Järvi	
2022	Works for Piano and Orchestra	Sergei Rachmaninoff, Eduard Tubin	Mihkel Poll, Estonian National Symphony Orchestra, conductor Mihhail Gerts	
2023	Estonian Premieres	Various	Estonian Festival Orchestra, conductor Paavo Järvi	
2024	KRATT	Tubin, Bacewicz, Lutosławski	Estonian Festival Orchestra, conductor Paavo Järvi	
2025	Ship of Fools	Jüri Reinvere	Estonian Festival Orchestra, conductor Paavo Järvi, soloists Maarika Järvi, Monika Mattiesen	

=== Alternative Awards & Winners\ ===
The Alternative genre was introduced in 2001.

==== Alternative Artist of the Year (2001–2004) ====
Year	Winner (Artist)	Album	Ref
2001	Una Bomba	Aerosol	
2003	Tallinn 73 Meets Kalm	Autopiloot	
2004	Chalice	Ühendatud inimesed	

==== Alternative/Indie Album of the Year (Since 2012) ====
Year	Winner (Album)	Artist	Ref
2012	Laika Virgin	Laika Virgin	
2013	Travel the World	Tenfold Rabbit	
2014	Say Whaat?	Kali Briis	
2015	7: Nõgesed	Vaiko Eplik	
2016	Öine bingo	Ans. Andur	
2017	Hingake / Breathe	Mick Pedaja	
2018	Efterglow	Erki Pärnoja	
2019	Muunduja	Maarja Nuut & Ruum	
2020	Anna Kaneelina	Anna Kaneelina	
2021	LEVA	Erki Pärnoja	
2022	Viiv	Janek Murd	
2023	Katarsis garanteeritud	Florian Wahl	
2024	Perfect Kindness	Night Tapes	
2025	Flo Raadio	Florian Wahl	

=== Hip-Hop/R'n'B/Rap/Soul/Funk Awards & Winners ===
The Hip-Hop/R'n'B genres were introduced in 2005 within a single award. From 2013–2015, R'n'B was omitted from the award and the Rap genre was recognised as similar but distinct from Hip-Hop music. From 2016 to 2022, the main award included all three genres. From 2023, the Soul and Funk genres were introduced. This category now awards 2 genres, Hip-Hop/Rap and Soul/Funk/R'n'B. In 2025, there was no award for Soul/Funk/R'n'B.

==== Hip-Hop/R'n'B Artist of the Year (2005–2011) ====
Year	Winner (Artist)	Album	Ref
2005	Toe Tag	Legendaarne	
2006	Chalice	Süsteemsüsteem	
2007	Tommy Boy	Suur pilt	
2008	Chalice	Taevas ja perse	
2009	Chalice	Supervõimed	
2010	Toe Tag	Kõik on formuleerimise küsimus	
2011	Metsakutsu	Testament	

==== Hip-Hop/Rap Album of the Year (2013–2015, 2018) ====
Year	Winner (Album)	Artist	Ref
2013	Per Aspera ad Astra	Põhja-Tallinn	
2014	Maailm meid saadab	Põhja-Tallinn	
2015	Genka / Paul Oja	Genka / Paul Oja	
2018	Mixtape nr 1	Genka / Paul Oja	
2019	¥€$	TOMM¥ €A$H	

==== Hip-Hop/Rap/R'n'B Album of the Year (2016–2017) ====
Year	Winner (Album)	Artist	Ref
2016	Resotsialiseerumine X Valge Lipp	Beebilõust	
2017	Kuhu koer on maetud	Metsakutsu	

==== HipHop/Rap/R'n'B Artist of the Year (2020–2022) ====
Year	Winner (Artist)	Album	Ref
2020	nublu		
2021	nublu	Café Kosmos	
2022	Genka & Dew8	OLEG	

==== Soul/Funk/R'n'B Artist of the Year (2023-2024) ====
Year	Winner (Artist)	Album	Ref
2023	Anett	Late to the Party	
2024	Anett x Fredi	Read Between The Lines	

==== Hip-Hop/Rap Artist of the Year (Since 2023) ====
Year	Winner (Artist)	Album	Ref
2023	reket	Palun Puhka	
2024	villemdrillem	väljateenitud	
2025	säm	Südamelt ära	

=== Electronic Awards & Winners ===
The Electronic genre was introduced in 2005.

==== Electronic Artist of the Year (2005–2011) ====
Replaced by Electronic Album of the Year in 2012

Year	Winner (Artist)	Album	Ref
2005	Kalm	Generalissimus Kalm	
2006	Dice	Play It Again	
2007	Köök	Telegramm	
2008	Broken Time Orchestra	Surmal on meie jaoks tähendus	
2009	Rulers Of The Deep	Ready to go overground	
2010	Popidiot	Antenna of Love	
2011	Leslie Da Bass	Minu kuningriik	

==== Electronic Album of the Year (Since 2012) ====
Year	Winner (Album)	Artist	Ref
2012	Kõige pikem päev	Tehnoloogiline Päike	
2013	Supernatural	Tiger Milk	
2014	Times New Roman	Leslie Da Bass	
2015	Histrionic	Maria Minerva	
2016	Insert Title	Avoid Dave	
2017	Rogue Wave	Mart Avi	
2018	Music Is Everywhere	Dave Storm	
2019	TIKS 068	Sander Mölder	
2020	TEN	Bert On Beats	
2021	Hüperruum	Planeet	
2022	Disposable Society	WATEVA	
2023	Blade	Mart Avi	
2024	Expensive Demos	Ajukaja	
2025	Death of Music	Ajukaja & Mart Avi	

=== Metal/Punk Awards & Winners ===
The Metal/Punk genre was introduced in 2005. In 2012, the Punk genre has been omitted and only Metal is recognised.

==== Metal/Punk Artist of the Year (2005–2011) ====
Replaced by Metal Album of the Year in 2012

Year	Winner (Artist)	Album	Ref
2005	Metsatöll	Hiiekoda	
2006	Metsatöll	Terast mis hangund me hinge	
2007	Shelton San	Spontaneous Black	
2008	Finish me off	Seed	
2009	Metsatöll	Iivakivi	
2010	No-Big-Silence	Starstealer	
2011	Metsatöll	Äio	

==== Metal Album of the Year (Since 2012) ====
Year	Winner (Album)	Artist	Ref
2012	Ulg	Metsatöll	
2013	Satanic Disappointment	Pedigree	
2014	Scaled	Talbot	
2015	Karjajuht	Metsatöll	
2016	Masin	Herald	
2017	Supersargasso	Taak	
2018	Standard Sundown	Pedigree	
2019	Magnetism	Talbot	
2020	3	Kannabinõid	
2021	FLUX	Juur	
2022	Pangetäis Bängereid	Mört	
2023	Surgent	Surgent	
2024	MASS	Kannabinõid	
2025	Inkvisiitor	Goresoerd	

=== Rock Awards & Winners ===
The Rock genre was introduced in 2006.

==== Rock Artist of the Year (2006–2011) ====
Replaced by Rock Album of the Year in 2012

Year	Winner (Artist)	Album	Ref
2006	Tanel Padar & The Sun	The Greatest Hits	
2007	Tanel Padar & The Sun	100% rock’n’roll	
2008	Vaiko Eplik ja Eliit	Vaiko Eplik & Eliit 2	
2009	Vaiko Eplik ja Eliit	3: Kosmoseodüsseia	
2010	Röövel Ööbik	Ringrada	
2011	Ultima Thule	Jälgede jälgedes	

==== Rock Album of the Year (Since 2012) ====
Year	Winner (Album)	Artist	Ref
2012	Good Man Down	Ewert and The Two Dragons	
2013	6 Varielu	Vaiko Eplik	
2014	Facelift Deer	Facelift Deer	
2015	Pressure & Pleasure	Elephants From Neptune	
2016	Circles	Ewert and The Two Dragons	
2017	Oh No	Elephants From Neptune	
2018	Kunagi läänes	Miljardid	
2019	Hands Around the Moon	Ewert and The Two Dragons	
2020	Hetk. InSpereeritud Tüürist	Põhja Konn, Vox Clamantis, Estonian Cello Ensemble	
2021	Ma luban, et ma muutun	Miljardid	
2022	Soup Can Pop Band	The Boondocks	
2023	Boogieland	Elephants From Neptune	
2024	It Is What It Is	Bedwetters	
2025	Surm Lõuna-Saksamaal	Kosmikud	

=== Pop Awards & Winners ===
Pop has been recognised as a distinct genre since 2009.

==== Pop Artist of the Year (2009–2011, Since 2020) ====
From 2012-2019, this award was replaced by "Pop Album of the Year"

Year	Winner (Artist)	Album	Ref
2009	Kerli	Love is dead	
2010	Popidiot	Antenna of Love	
2011	Lenna	Lenna	
2020	Liis Lemsalu		
2021	Anett	Morning After	
2022	NOËP	No Man Is An Island	
2023	STEFAN	Hope	
2024	NOËP	Move Your Feet	
2025	nublu		

==== Pop Album of the Year (2012–2019) ====
Year	Winner (Album)	Artist	Ref
2012	Wide awake	Outloudz	
2013	Öö mu kannul käib	Ott Lepland	
2014	Bermuda	HU?	
2015	Vääramatu jõud	Karl-Erik Taukar	
2016	Elina Born	Elina Born	
2017	Kaks	Karl-Erik Taukar	
2018	+1	Liis Lemsalu	
2019	Heads In The Clouds	NOËP	

=== Dance Awards & Winners ===
Dance was recognised as a distinct genre from 1998–2003.

==== Dance Hit of the Year (1998–2001) ====
Replaced by Hit Song of the Year in 2003

Year	Winner (Song)	Artist	Ref
1998	Ma varjuna kannul sul käin 98’	2 Quick Start	
1999	O Si Nene	Caater	
2000	Once in a Lifetime	Ines	
2001	Salaja	Hannah	

==== Dance Artist of the Year (2001, 2003) ====
Year	Winner (Artist)	Album	Ref
2001	2 Quick Start	Ühega miljoneist	
2003	Caater	Club Space	
