= List of musical groups from Estonia =

This is a list of musical groups (including bands, orchestras; individual list is for List of Estonian choirs) from Estonia. The list is incomplete.

Name	Type	Genre	Existing year(s)	Further info
2 Quick Start	band		1992	Soloist: Pearu Paulus
5miinust	band	hip hop	2016–	Members: Estoni Kohver (Kristjan Jakobson), Päevakoer, Põhja-Korea, Lancelot and Venelane (Pavel Botšarov)
Apelsin	band	rock/country/parody	1974–	
A-Rühm	band	hip hop	1998–	Members: Cool D, G-Enka, Kozy, DJ Critikal
Bedwetters	band	punk, rock	2004-2013	
Camerata Tallinn			1978-1996	
Corelli Consort	ensemble			
Defrage	band			
Elephants From Neptune				
Estonian Academy of Music and Theater Symphony Orchestra	orchestra			
Estonian Police Orchestra	orchestra			
Ewert and The Two Dragons	band	rock	2008-	
Forgotten Sunrise				
Frankie Animal	band			
Helitron				
Hortus Musicus				
In Spe	band	rock	1979-1985	
Karavan				
Kiigelaulukuuik	band	jazz	1986	Key person: Olav Ehala
Kiri-uu				Estonian diaspora band
Kristallid	band	guitar music	1966-1969	Vocalist: Jaak Joala
Kukerpillid				
Kuldne Trio				
Lõõtsavägilased	ensemble	folk	2014-	
Malcolm Lincoln	band			
No-Big-Silence	band			
Trad.Attack!	band	folk	2013–	
Traffic	band			
Meelik	band	indie rock	2022-	Members: Andres Kõpper, Martin Petermann, Meelik Samel, Rain Parve
Metsatöll	band	metal/folk	1999-	
Miljardid	band		2015-	
NYYD Ensemble	orchestra			
Pärnu City Orchestra	orchestra			
Peoleo	band		1965-1973	Members: Henno Käo
Puuluup	band	Estonian nu-folk	2014-	Members: Ramo Teder, Marko Veisson
Rock Hotel	band			Members: Ivo Linna
Satelliidid	band		1965	Members: Gunnar Graps
Tallinn Chamber Orchestra	orchestra			
Untsakad	band	folk	1992-	
Vanilla Ninja	band	pop rock	2002-	Members: Lenna Kuurmaa, Piret Järvis, Kerli Kivilaan Former members: Maarja Meriste-Kivi, Katrin Siska, Triinu Kivilaan
Vennaskond	band	punk rock	1984-	
