= Kaia Urb =

Estonian opera singer (born 1956)

Kaia Urb (also Kaia Galina Urb; born on 26 February 1956 in Tallinn) is an Estonian singer (soprano). She is especially known by her oratorio performances.

== Career ==
She graduated from Tallinn State Conservatory in music pedagogics and singing speciality.

Since 1982 she has been a member of Estonian Philharmonic Chamber Choir. She has sung many solo parts at the choir. Her repertoire is wide: from baroque music to contemporary classical music. She has also sung with the ensembles Camerata Tallinn and Corelli Consort.

== Awards ==
- 1996 and 1998: Annual Prize of the Estonian Cultural Endowment for Music
- 2013: Order of the White Star, IV class.
