= Caater =

Estonian musical group

- Origin: Tallinn, Estonia
- Genres: Eurodance
- Years active: 1997-2004
- Label: Sony Music
- Members: Kalle Kukk; Andrus Lang
- Past members: Markku Tiidumaa; Ivor Võlmets

Caater was an Estonian Eurodance duo consisting of Kalle Kukk and Markku Tiidumaa. Caater is signed with Sony Music.

In 1999, Caater was awarded the "Kuldne Plaat" (gold record) at the Estonian Music Awards for the single "O Si Nene". That year, it was also named band of the year and album of the year.

== Discography ==
=== Albums ===
- I (1997)
- II Level (1997)
- Contact (1998)
- Freakshow (1998)
- Space Invasion (1998)
- Millennium: The Best Of Caater (1999)
- Connected (2000)
- King Size (2001)
- Club Space (2002)
- The Queen of Night (with Trinity) (2003)

=== Singles ===
Year	Single	Covered From	Peak chart positions
Year	Single	Covered From	FIN
1999	"O Si Nene"	"L.A. Style - I'm Raving (Oh Si Ne Ne)"	—
2000	"Hold That Sucker Down"	"O.T. Quartet - Hold That Sucker Down"	—
2000	"Phantom"	N/A	—
2000	"Dance with You"	N/A	7
2001	"Free My Body"	N/A	11
2001	"King Size"	N/A	—
2002	"Somebody"	N/A	11
2002	"Friday"	N/A	14
2002	"Master Tune"	N/A	—
2003	"The Queen of the Night"	N/A	9
2004	"Endless Summer"	N/A	13
"—" denotes releases that did not chart
