= Kadri Voorand =

Estonian singer and composer

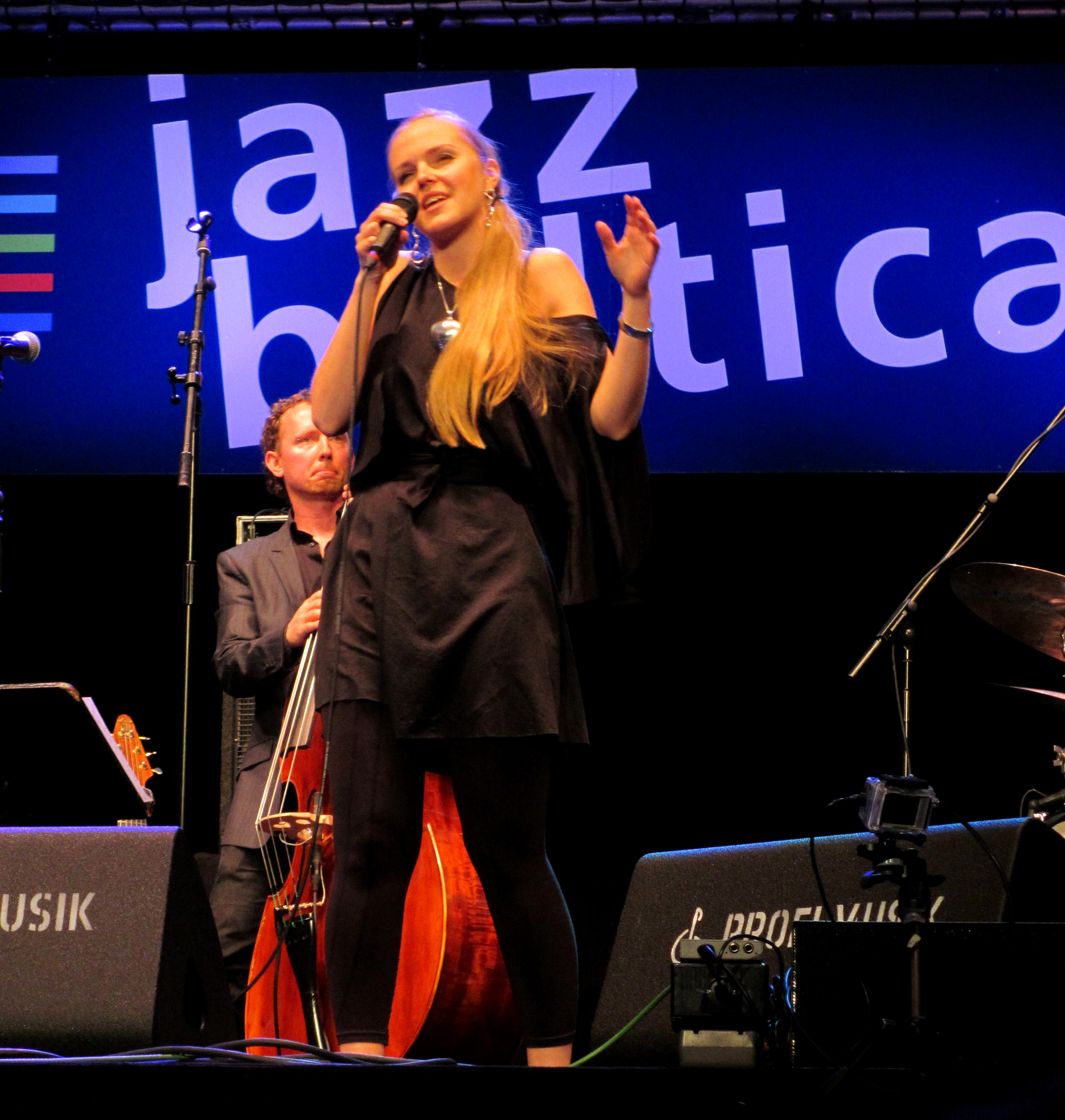
- Voorand performing at Jazz Baltica 2013

Background information
- Born: Kadri Voorand; November 18, 1986 (age 39); Haljala, then part of Estonian SSR, Soviet Union
- Genres: Jazz; Pop; Folk; Contemporary jazz
- Occupations: Singer; songwriter; composer; multi-instrumentalist
- Instruments: Vocals; piano; guitar; violin; kalimba; live looping
- Years active: 2007–present
- Label: ACT Music
- Formerly of: Estonian Voices; Tanel Ruben Quintet; European Jazz Orchestra; Kadri Voorand Trio; Heliotroop
- Website: kadrivoorand.com

Kadri Voorand (born 18 November 1986, in Haljala) is an Estonian singer, songwriter, and composer. She has won multiple Estonian Music Awards and is signed to ACT Music, one of Europe's prominent jazz labels.

She has been the leader or member of several musical groups, including Tormis Quartet, Tanel Ruben Quintet, Kadri Voorand Trio, Kadri Voorand Quartet and Estonian Voices. She has collaborated with internationally acclaimed musicians, including conductor and composer Kristjan Järvi and has composed for the Grammy-winning Estonian Philharmonic Chamber Choir.

In 2017 and 2020, she received the award for Jazz Album of the Year at the Estonian Music Awards. In 2017, she also received the award for Best Female Artist of the Year. In 2019 and 2025, she received the Jazz Album of the Year award as a member of the vocal ensemble Estonian Voices.

== Early life and career ==
Voorand was born in Haljala, Estonia, and began her musical career in 2007 with the group Sheikid. After a childhood spent playing with folk musicians, arranging for her vocal a cappella group, and performing as a solo vocalist, she began her jazz vocal studies at the Estonian Academy of Music and Theatre and continued her education at the Royal Swedish Music Academy.

She quickly gained recognition for her exceptional vocal range and songwriting abilities, leading to collaborations with established Estonian jazz musicians including the Tanel Ruben Quintet. By 2012, Voorand was performing internationally, including as vocalist for the European Jazz Orchestra, touring across Europe and establishing her reputation beyond Estonia's borders.

== Career ==
=== Breakthrough period (2013–2018) ===
Voorand's profile grew through her work with the Kadri Voorand Trio and the formation of Estonian Voices. Her 2016 solo album Armupurjus (Love Intoxication) won both Best Jazz Album and Best Female Artist at the Estonian Music Awards.

=== International recognition (2019–present) ===
Voorand's signing to ACT Music in 2019 expanded her international reach. Her album In Duo with Mihkel Mälgand (2020) received critical acclaim and won the Estonian Music Award for Best Jazz Album.

She has performed at major international festivals and continues to tour extensively throughout Europe as both a solo artist and with various ensembles.

== Musical style ==
Voorand's performances incorporate multi-instrumental performance across vocals, piano, guitar, violin, and kalimba. She is known for her use of live looping technology to create layered compositions and atmospheric soundscapes during performances. Her work often integrates traditional Estonian folk melodies with contemporary jazz arrangements.

Critics have noted the immersive quality of her live performances, with UK Jazz News describing her as "truly the modern virtuoso comfortable in a whole wide range of material to which she gives huge stage presence and energy." Jazzwise similarly praised her performances as "expressive as ever, with rousing, highly entertaining moments."

== Awards and recognition ==
=== Individual awards ===
- 2008: Young Jazz Talent Award of the Year
- 2014: Estonian Music Council Award
- 2017: Estonian Music Awards – Best Female Artist of the Year
- 2017: Estonian Music Awards – Best Jazz Album of the Year (Armupurjus)
- 2019: President's Young Cultural Figure Award
- 2020: Estonian Public Broadcasting's Musician of the Year
- 2020: Estonian Music Awards – Best Jazz Album of the Year (In Duo With Mihkel Mälgand)

=== Estonian Voices awards ===
- 2015: Estonian Music Awards – Best Jazz Album of the Year (Ole Hea)
- 2016: Best Jazz Artist in Estonia
- 2018: Estonian Music Awards – Best Jazz Album of the Year (Taat läks lolliks)
- 2025: Estonian Music Awards – Best Jazz Album of the Year (Kallimale)

== Discography ==
=== Solo albums ===
Year	Album	Label	Notes
2009	Tunde kaja	Sheikid	with Kadri Voorand Group
2012	Kosmogooniline etüüd	Sheikid	with Kadri Voorand Trio
2016	Armupurjus	Sheikid	Best Jazz Album, Best Female Artist
2020	In Duo with Mihkel Mälgand	ACT Music	Best Jazz Album
2025	Live in Munich	Sheikid	EP, live recording

=== Estonian Voices ===
Year	Album	Label	Notes
2015	Ole Hea	Sheikid	Best Jazz Album
2018	Taat läks lolliks	Sheikid	Best Jazz Album
2024	Kallimale	Sheikid	Best Jazz Album

=== Notable collaborations ===
- Sheikid (2007) – with Sheikid
- Kogutud rikkus (2008) – Tanel Ruben Quintet ft. Kadri Voorand & Kristjan Randalu
- Dance Music (2010) – Antony Branker & Ascent
- Enchanted Hours (2011) – Tanel Ruben Quintet ft. Kadri Voorand & Kristjan Randalu
- Ennemuistse jahipüssi kuul (2014) – Heliotroop
- Mirror (2016) – Tõnu Kõrvits, ECM Records
- Tormisele (2018) – Tormis Quartet
- Every Moment Every Day (2024) – Tanel Ruben Quintet

=== Singles ===
Year	Single
2015	"Elu on lootus ja loomine"
2015	"Aga tule"
2015	"I'm Not in Love"
2019	"What If I Did Kill You"
2021	"Energy"
2025	"Katariina Rosalie"
2025	"Imagine"

== Critical reception ==
Voorand has received positive reviews from international music publications throughout her career. An early All About Jazz review noted that she "appears with a super voice that's a cross between Oleta Adams and Dianne Reeves—and with, possibly, more range than either—and writing that is neither overly sentimental nor abstract."

London Jazz News described her as "a unique thoroughbred entertainer on a high musical level who hits people's body and soul." DownBeat magazine highlighted her innovative use of "layered, multitracked singing and looped recordings of intakes of breath to craft a percussive element."

Reviews have consistently highlighted her dynamic stage presence and technical innovation in combining traditional Estonian elements with contemporary jazz approaches.

== Other works ==
In 2021, Voorand participated in "Eesti Laul 2021" with the song "Energy," achieving 6th place.

She has composed works for the Grammy-winning Estonian Philharmonic Chamber Choir, including the piece "Giving Myself to the Sea."

Voorand has composed several works for the Estonian Song Festival (Laulupidu), Estonia's national choral festival. Her composition "Ära mind lahti lase" (Don't Let Me Go), with lyrics by Triin Soomets, was performed at the XXVII Song Festival in 2019 and received an encore performance due to popular demand. She has also composed "Elu on lootus ja loomine" (Life is Hope and Creation) with lyrics by Doris Kareva for mixed choirs, and "Aga tule" (But Come) with lyrics by Liisa Lotta Tomp. For the upcoming XXVIII Song Festival in 2025, she has composed "Sina oled kullatera" (You Are a Golden Grain) with lyrics by Kristiina Ehin for women's choir.
