= Liisi Koikson =

Estonian singer and actress

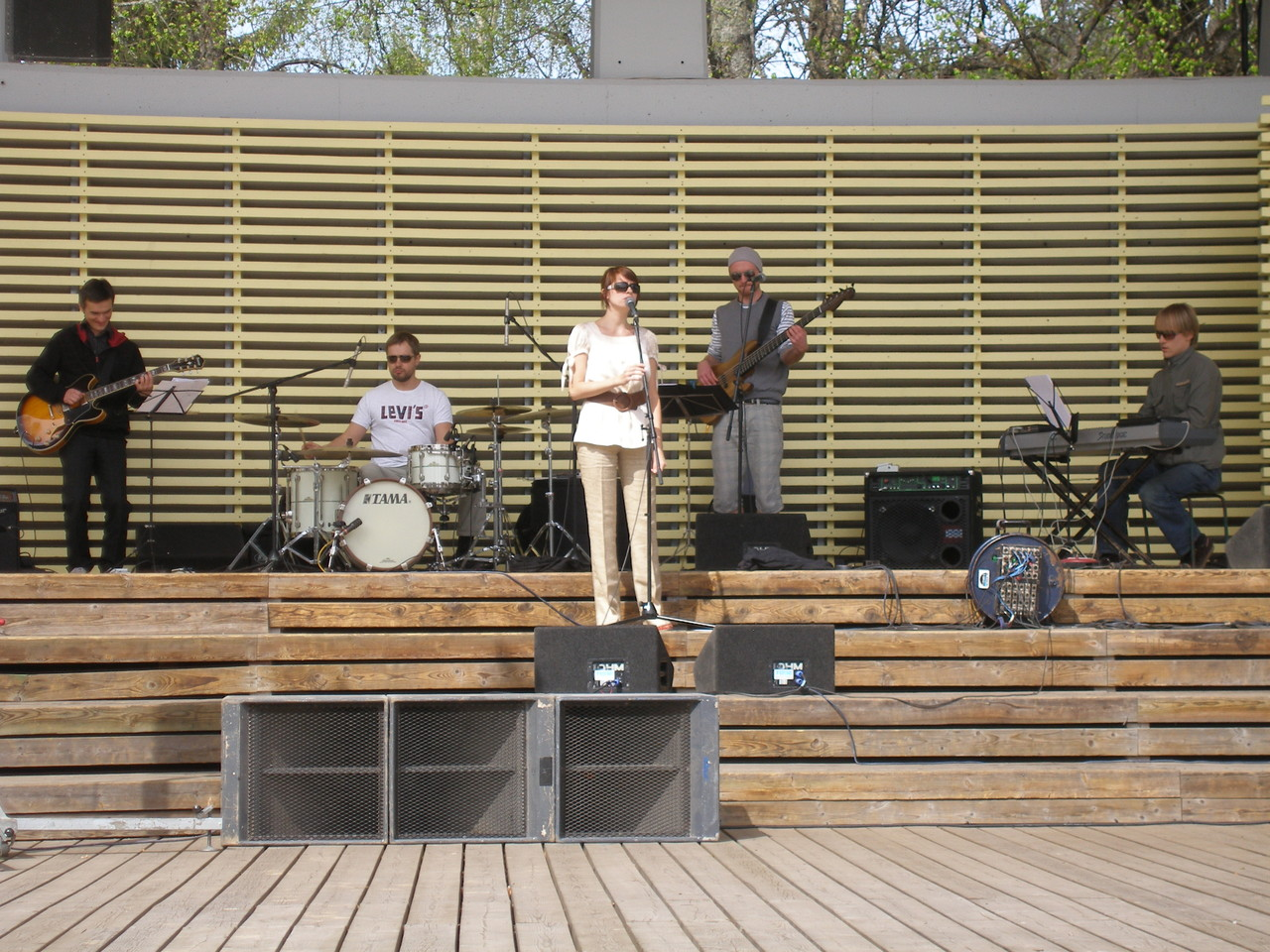
Liisi Koikson

Liisi Koikson (born 4 June 1983 in Kilingi-Nõmme) is an Estonian singer, singing teacher and actress.

Liisi Koikson attended Kilingi-Nõmme Gymnasium, graduating in 2001. Her first singing coach was composer, choir director and vocal pedagogue Toomas Voll, from 1991 until 1999. In 1993, at age ten, Koikson won the Eesti Televisioon (ETV) song competition Laulukarussell for the 8–10 year old category. In 2006, she graduated from the Georg Ots Tallinn Music College. From 2011 until 2014, she studied at the Tech Music School (University of West London) in London, where she obtained a bachelor's degree.

Koikson has worked as a singing teacher at the Heino Eller Music School and the NUKU Theatre. She has appeared in several stage musicals, such as Evita, Aida, The Sound of Music, Georg and Jesus Christ Superstar.

In 2003 and 2005, she received the award "Best Female Artist of the Year" at the Estonian Music Awards.

In 2008 she had a starring role as Anna Rõuk in the film December Heat.

== Solo albums ==
- Liisi (1997)
- The Gemini Diaries (2002)
- Liisi Koikso (2003)
- Maailma kaunimad jõululaulud (2003)
- Väike järv (2005)
- Väikeste asjade võlu (2007)
- Ettepoole (2010)
- Liisi Koikson Vaikne Esmaspäev (2012)
- Õhtu rannal (2013)
- Coffee For One (EP, 2017)
- Bittersweet (EP, 2019)
