= Põhja-Tallinn (band) =

Estonian musical group

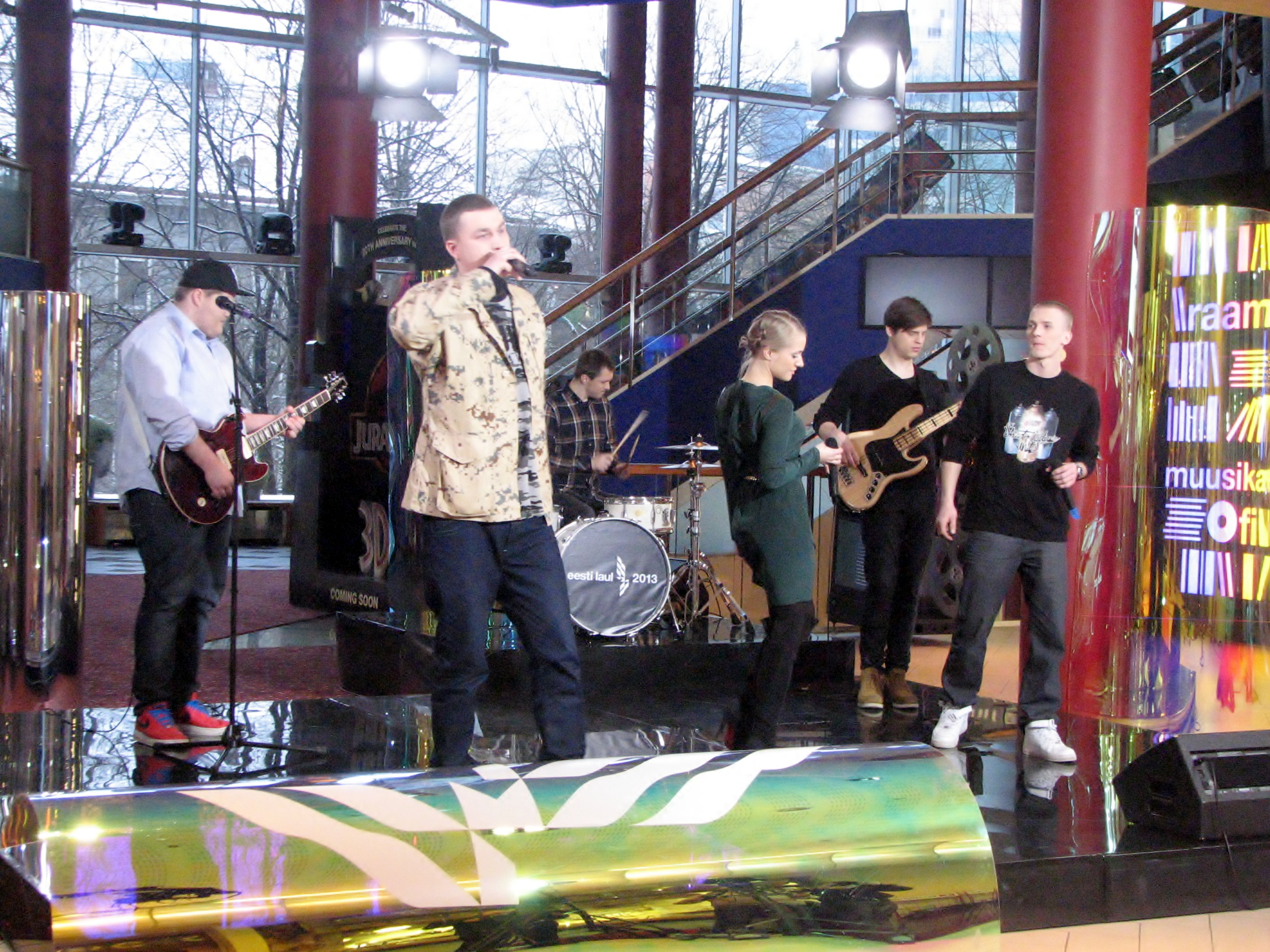
Põhja-Tallinn singing in Solaris Center (February 2012)

Põhja-Tallinn is an Estonian hip hop band. The band was established in 2007.

In 2013, the band won one award in Estonian Music Awards, namely, in the category "best band of the year".

Also in 2013, the group entered Eesti Laul, Estonia's annual national song contest. They made it to the final, but came 6th overall.

== Members ==
Jaanus Saks (Aka Wild Disease) (Vocal)

Kaspar Raudkivi (Aka Mini) (Vocal)

Alvar Risto Vürst (Aka Fate) (Vocal)

Carlos Roos (Guitar)

Robert Loigom (Drums)

Hannes Agur Vellend (Bassguitar)

Maia Vahtramäe (Vocal)

Kenneth Rüütli (Aka Kenny/Kenito) (Vocal)

== Discography ==
=== Albums ===
- 2012 "Per Aspera Ad Astra" (Masterhead Records)
- 2013 "Maailm Meid Saadab" (Masterhead Records)
- 2015 "Regeneratsioon" (Masterhead Records)
- 2017 "Alati Olemas" (Masterhead Records)
