= Popidiot =

Estonian musical group

Popidiot is an Estonian band.

In 2009, the band won several awards in the Estonian Music Awards, including in the category "best band of the year" and "best video of the year".

== Members ==
- Hendrik Luuk
- Matti Peura

== Discography ==
=== Albums ===
- 2005: "1111" (Seksound)
- 2009: "Friday's Remixes" (Seksound)
- 2009: "Antenna Of Love" (Seksound)
