= HU? =

Estonian musical group

HU? is an Estonian band. The name "HU?" is derived from the first letters of Estonian singer Hannaliisa Uusma.

In 2009, the band won two awards in Estonian Music Awards, namely, in the categories "best band of the year" and "best album of the year".

== Members ==
- Hannaliisa Uusma
- DJ Critikal
- Leslie Laasner
- Sigrid Mutso.

== Discography ==
=== Albums ===
- 2008 "Film" (Mindnote)
- 2010 "HU2"(Mindnote)
- 2011 "Läbi Öö" (Mindnote)
- 2013 "Bermuda" (Mindnote)
