= Singer Vinger =

Estonian musical group

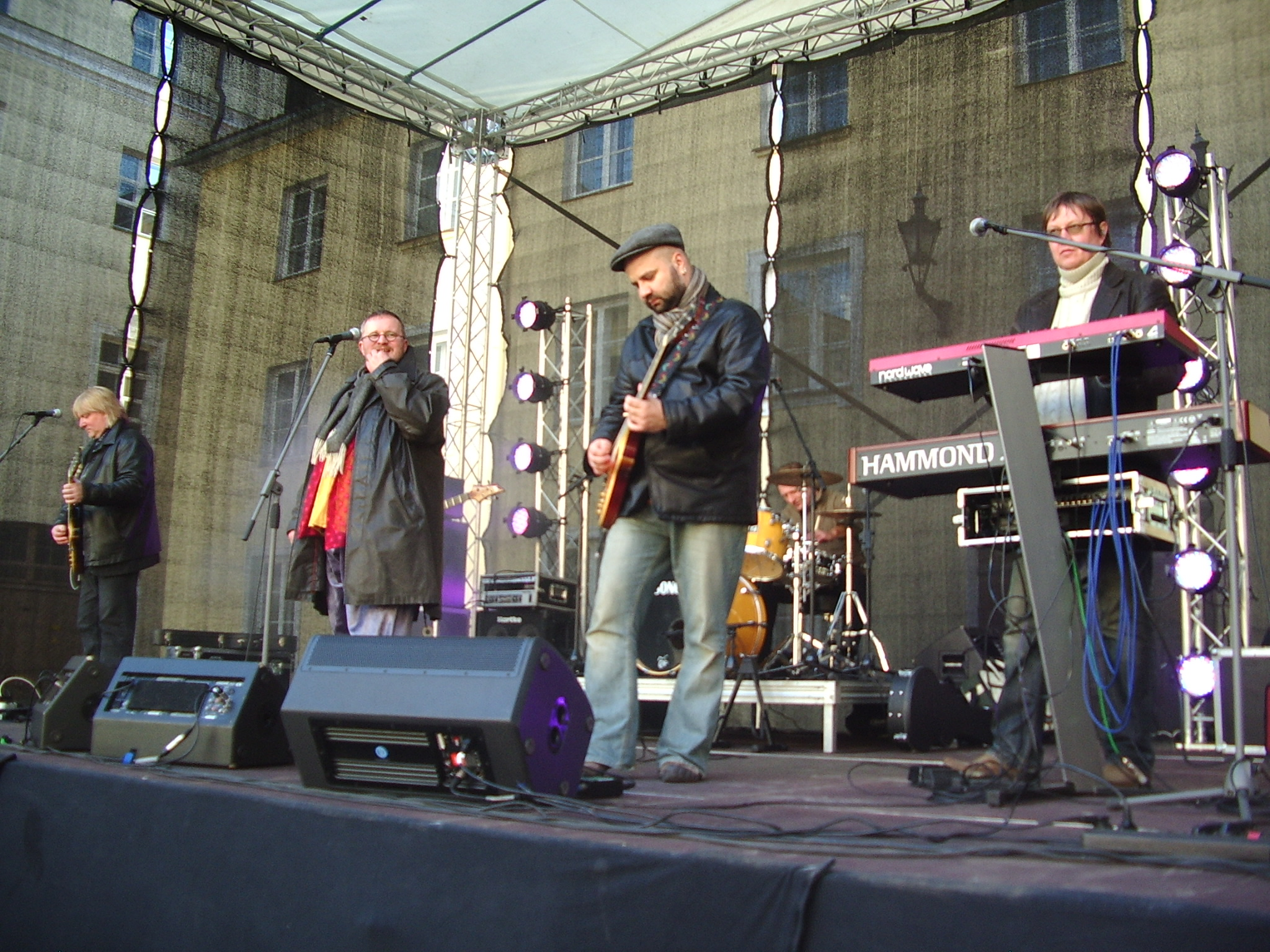
- Singer Vinger in the courtyard of Toompea Castle (2009)

Background information
- Also known as: Singer-Vinger, Pära Trust, Turist
- Origin: Estonia
- Genres: Punk rock Rock
- Years active: 1985–present
- Members: Hardi Volmer; Roald Jürlau; Mihkel Raud; Rein Joasoo; Avo Ulvik; Eerik Olle; Elmu Värk; Jaanus Raudkats

Singer Vinger is an Estonian punk rock band. It was founded in 1985, before that being named Pära Trust (Backside Trust, 1979–1983), Turist (Tourist, 1983–1985), and Aken (Window), among other names. According to singer Hardi Volmer, the name Singer Vinger was picked after the Estonian SSR Ministry of Culture deemed Turist inappropriate.

Throughout the name changes, the band's leader, main songwriter, and singer has been Hardi Volmer. The main themes in the band's songs are social-critical irony and humour.

== Members ==
- Hardi Volmer – vocals
- Roald Jürlau – guitar, back vocal
- Mihkel Raud – guitar
- Rein Joasoo – drums
- Avo Ulvik – keyboards (until 2011)
- Ülo Krigul – keyboards (since 2011)
- Jaanus Raudkats – bass (1990, 1995 to 1999)
- Eerik Olle – bass

=== Turist ===
- Hardi Volmer – vocals
- Veljo Vingissar (Vink) – vocals, guitar
- Roald Jürlau (Jürilaud) – guitar
- Avo Ulvik (Ulvaeus) – keyboards
- Andrus Kerstenbeck (Kersta) – drums (until April 1985)
- Rein Joasoo – drums (since April 1985)
- Eerik Olle – bass
- Villu Veski – keyboards, saxophone

=== Pära Trust ===
- Jaak Arro (Jekabs) – vocals (until February 1982)
- Veljo Vingissar (Vink) – guitar
- Jüri Kermik – guitar (until September 1981)
- Roald Jürlau (Rollo) – guitar (since September 1981)
- Hardi Volmer – drums (until February 1982), vocals (since February 1982)
- Andrus Kerstenbeck (Kersta) – drums (since February 1982)
- Eerik Olle – bass

== Albums ==
- Singer Vinger (1988)
- Jää jumalaga puberteet (1989)
- Reanimatsioon (1995)
- Amneesia (1996)
- Troinoi (2000)
- Ärq ei lääq (2003)
- Eesti Kullafond: Singer Vinger (2005)
- 20 aastat singumist ja vingumist (2006)
- Suu laulab, Süda läigib (2012)
