= Kõrsikud =

Estonian musical group

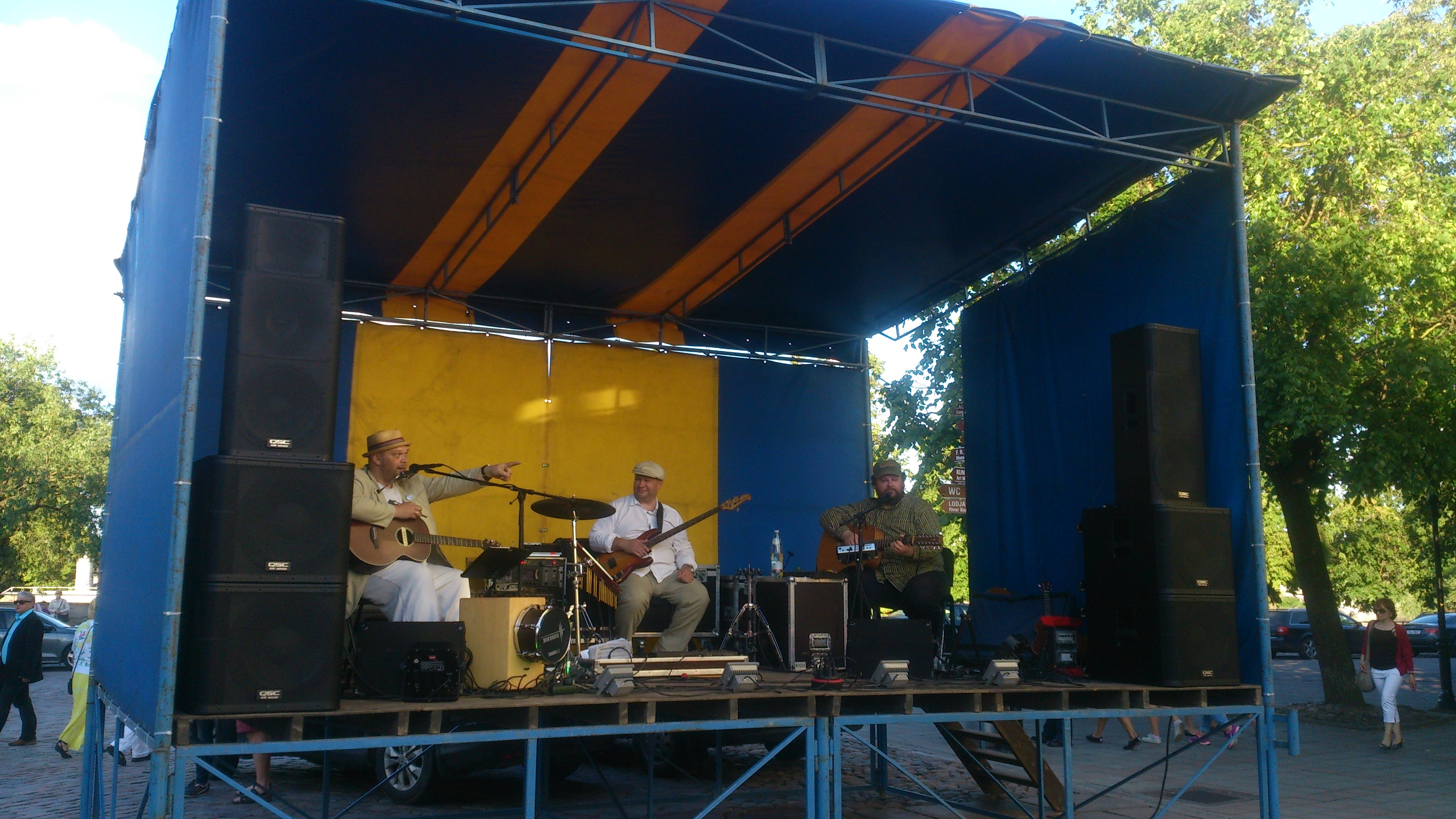
Kõrsikud singing in Tartu (June 2015)

Kõrsikud is an Estonian band.

In 2014, the band won one award in Estonian Music Awards, namely, in the category "best band of the year".

== Members ==
- Jaan Pehk
- Andrus Albrecht
- Alari Piispea
- Lauri Liivak.

== Discography ==
=== Albums ===
- 2012 "Kolme peale"
- 2013 "Sinu südames"
