= Elephants From Neptune =

Estonian musical group

Elephants From Neptune is an Estonian rock band.

In 2017, the band won one award in Estonian Music Awards, namely, in the category "best band of the year".

== Members ==
- Robert Linna - vocals, guitars, keyboards
- Markko Reinberg - guitars, lap steel, vocals
- Rain Joona - bass/ also Tamula järve person
- Jon Mikiver - drums, percussion.

== Discography ==
=== Albums ===
- 2012 "Elephants From Neptune" (Birdeye Entertainment)
- 2014 "Pressure & Pleasure" (Birdeye Entertainment)
- 2016 "Oh No" (Birdeye Entertainment)
- 2022 "Boogieland" (Roadhouse Records)
