= 2 Quick Start =

Estonian musical group

2 Quick Start is an Estonian band, created in 1992. In the 1990s, the band was one of the most notable dance music groups in Estonia.

In 2001, the band took an award in the "best band of the year" category at the Estonian Music Awards. At the 2018 Estonian Music Awards the band was granted an award for "Contribution to Estonian Music".

== Members ==
- Pearu Paulus – vocals
- Ilmar Laisaar – keyboards
- Alar Kotkas – bass
- Urmas Kahk – guitar
- Karl Kanter - guitar
- Jüri Mazurcak – drums
- Kärt Anton - female vocals
- Jaak Vasar - trumpet
- Eduard Akulin - trombone
- Mairo Marjamaa - saxophone
- Hele-Riin Uib-Pachel - percussion
- Weldson Pereira Archanjo - percussion

== Discography ==
=== Albums ===
- 1994 "2 Quick Start" (Sounder Plk)
- 1995 "Olen loobuda sust proovinud" (Aidem Pot)
- 1997 "Poolel teel su juurde" (Aidem Pot)
- 1999 "Teine pool: The Very Best Of 2 Quick Start, Vol. 1" (2QS Production)
- 2001 "Ühega miljoneist" (2QS Production)
- 2010 "2010" (2QS Production)
