= Maarja Nuut =

Estonian singer

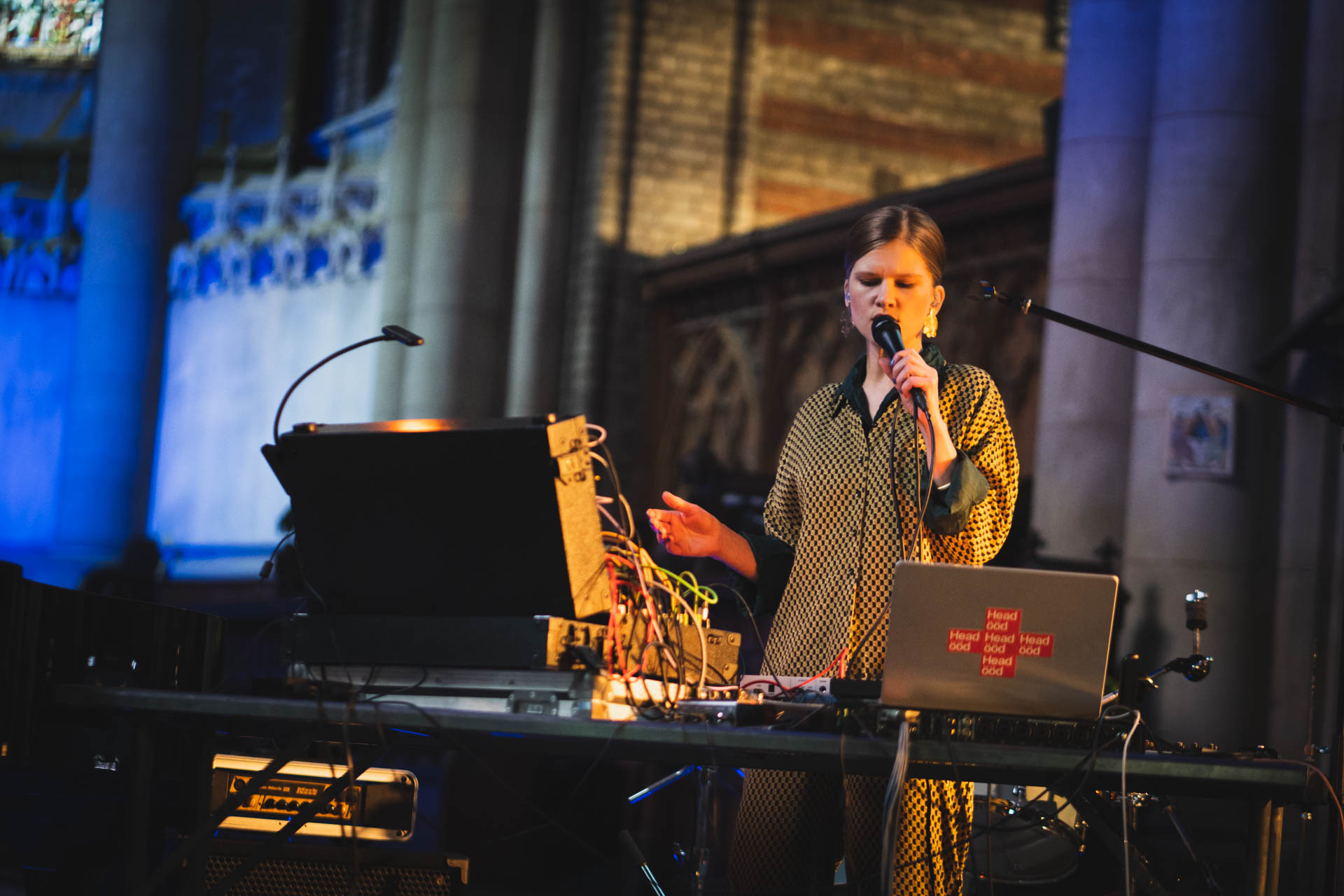
Maarja Nuut at the Great Escape Festival in Brighton area in 2022

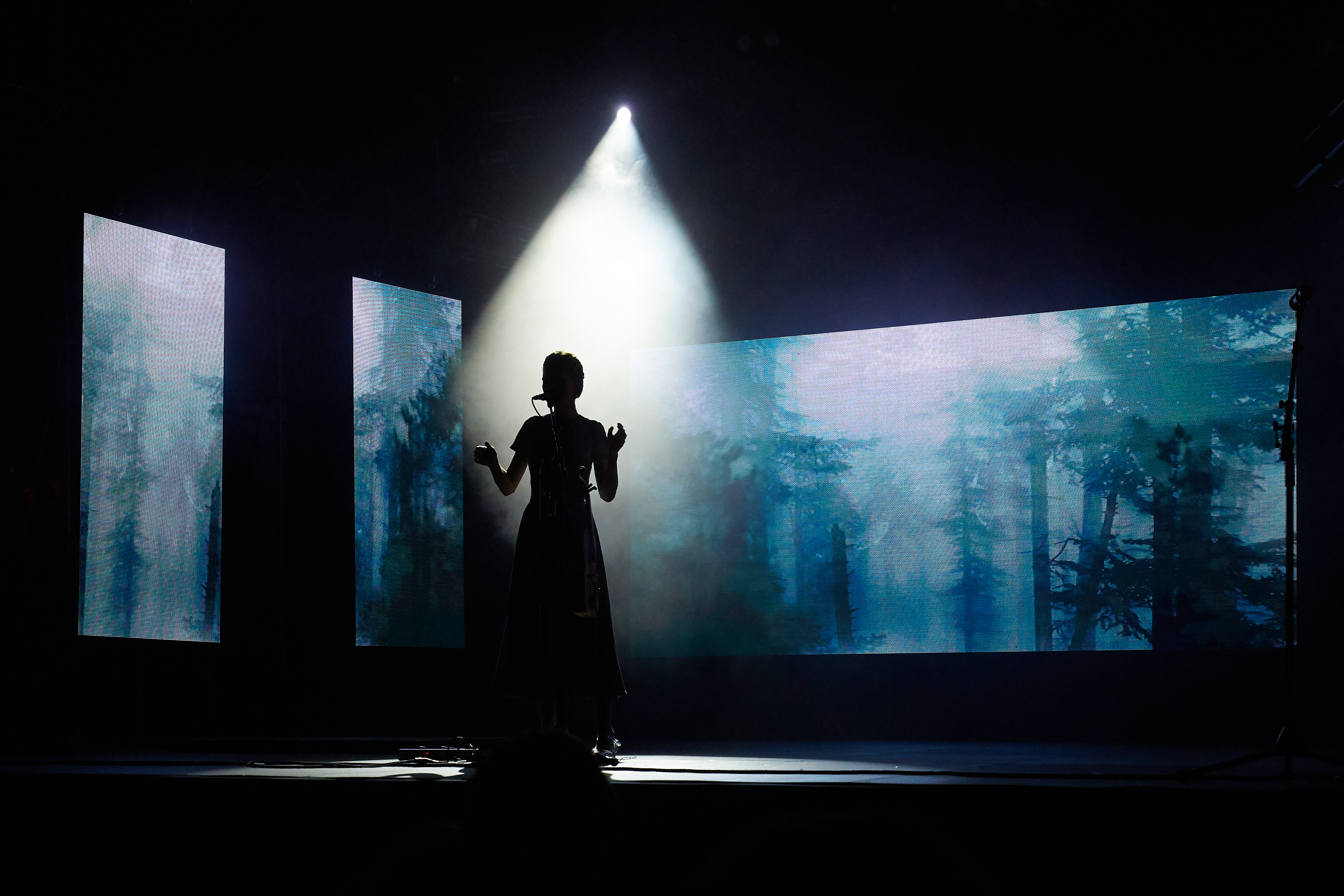
Maarja Nuut at the Viljandi Folk Music Festival (2016)

Maarja Nuut (born 11 February 1986) is an Estonian singer and violinist. After first studying classical music, she turned to folk, adopting the village style of traditional Estonian songs. She debuted as a solo artist in 2013, winning the Artists Prize at Tallinn Music Week. In 2016, she began to collaborate with Hendrik Kaljujärv (aka Ruum), who creates his own abstract electronic sounds. Together they have formed a successful duo, releasing recordings and performing at international festivals.

== Biography ==
Born in 1986 in Rakvere, Maarja Nuut was introduced to music by her mother, a choir director. When she was seven, she began to take violin lessons, studying at the Tallinn Music High School from the age of 12. She then attended the Estonian Academy of Music and Theatre. She developed an early interest in folk music while attending music festivals in Estonia and throughout Europe. When she was 21, she travelled to India with the Dutch cellist Saskia Rao-de Haas to study Hindustani music.

Back in Estonia, in 2008 she decided to move into folk music which she studied at the Viljandi Culture Academy, a department of the University of Tartu. Here she discovered 78-rpm recordings of pre-Soviet Estonian village music which inspired her own evolving style. In 2011, she completed her studies at the Stockholm University, expanding her interest in village folk music, especially in Poland. She graduated with a master's degree in music in 2014.

In her current performances based on the violin, looper, and keyboard, she develops the lyrics from village music into contemporary compositions. Together with Ruum, she released her first album Muunduja (Shifter) in October 2018.
