= Sten Lassmann =

Estonian pianist

Sten Lassmann (born 26 May 1982) is an Estonian pianist trained at the Tallinn Music High School, the Estonian Academy of Music, the Conservatoire de Paris and the Royal Academy of Music best known for his work on Heino Eller's music.

In 2002 Lassmann won the VI Tallinn National Piano Competition, and four years later he shared its first international edition's 3rd prize with Daniil Sayamov. He is the son of Peep Lassmann.
