= Miljardid =

Estonian musical group

- Origin: Tallinn, Estonia
- Genres: Alternative rock, indie rock
- Years active: 2015–present
- Labels: Made In Baltics
- Members: Marten Kuningas; Raul Ojamaa; Peedu Kass; Kristjan Kallas

Miljardid is an Estonian alternative and indie band.

Miljardid participated in Eesti Laul 2018's first semifinal with their song "Pseudoprobleem", though they did not make it to the final of the contest. According to the Estonian Public Broadcasting Culture Portal's album of the year, "Ever in the West" (of the same album) was ranked seventh overall, and first in Estonian (domestic) albums for that year.

They won three awards in the 2018 Estonian Music Awards under three different categories: Year's Debut Album, Year's Rock Album and Year's Album.

== Discography ==
- Kunagi läänes (2017)
- Ma Luban, et ma Muutun (2020)
