= The Deer's Cry (Pärt) =

Motet by Arvo Pärt

- Sacred motet by Arvo Pärt
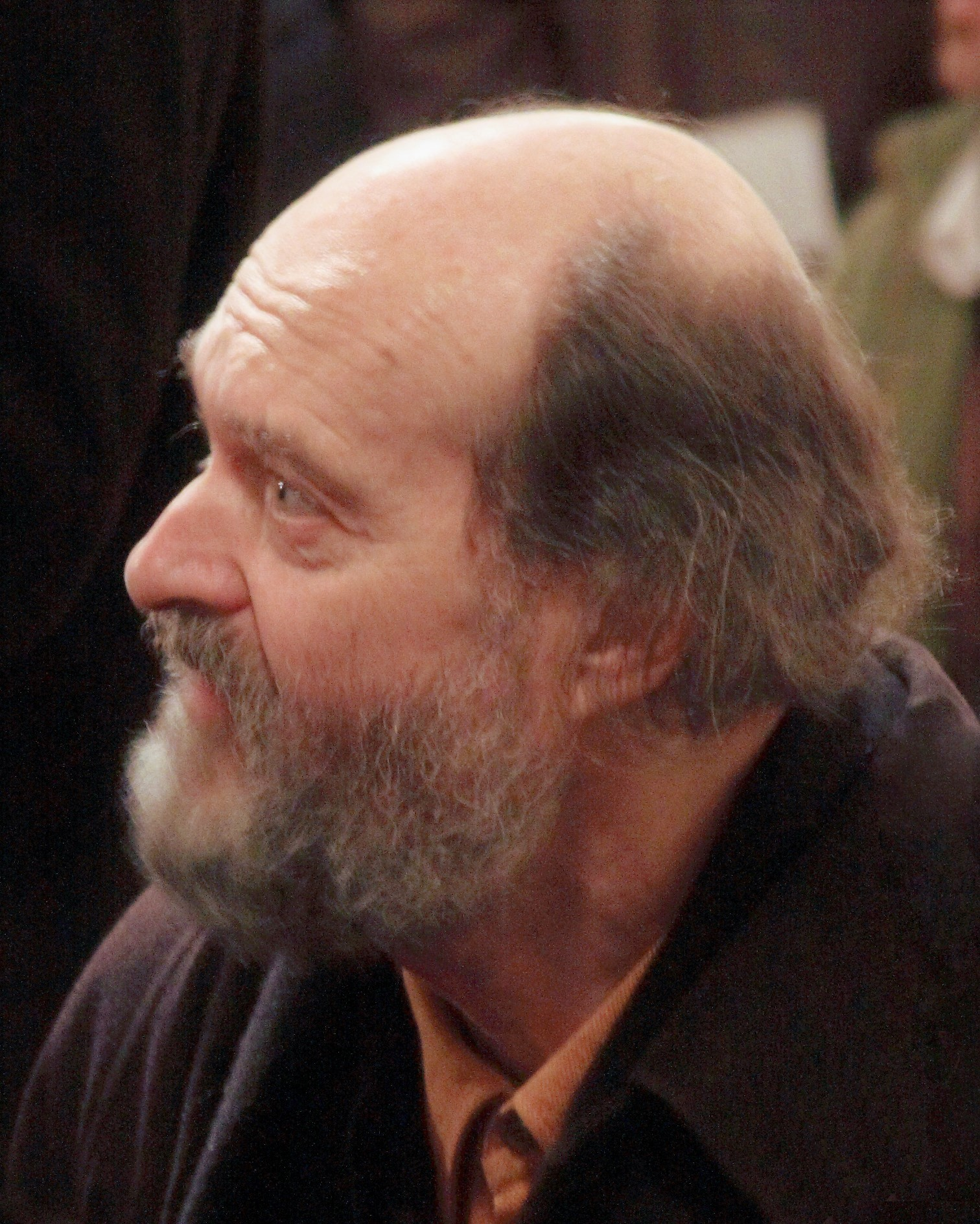
- The composer in 2008
- Style: Contemporary music
- Text: from Saint Patrick's Breastplate
- Language: English
- Performed: February 2008
- Published: 2007
- Scoring: SATB choir

The Deer's Cry is a sacred motet by Arvo Pärt, set to text from a traditional Irish lorica for a four-part choir a cappella. He composed the piece on a commission from the Ireland's Louth Contemporary Music Society. It was published by Universal Edition in 2007 and first performed in County Louth, Ireland, in February 2008.

== History ==
The work was commissioned by the Louth Contemporary Music Society. The text is the final part of a traditional prayer for protection, Saint Patrick's Breastplate, attributed to St. Patrick, the primary patron saint of Ireland. The text is known as "The Deer's Cry", "The Breastplate of St Patrick", or "Lorica" and is often attributed to the saint. Pärt wrote his setting in modern English, beginning with "Christ with me", composed for a four-part choir a cappella. It was published by Universal Edition in 2007, and was first performed by the State Choir Latvija, conducted by Fergus Sheil, in Drogheda on 13 February 2008. The Deer's Cry is in a single movement and takes about five minutes to perform.

== Text ==
Pärt set an excerpt of the prayer, its conclusion, and repeated the first line of that section ("Christ with me") in the end:

Christ with me, Christ before me, Christ behind me,
Christ in me, Christ beneath me, Christ above me,
Christ on my right, Christ on my left,
Christ when I lie down, Christ when I sit down,
Christ in me, Christ when I arise,
Christ in the heart of everyone who thinks of me,
Christ in the mouth of everyone who speaks of me,
Christ in every eye that sees me,
Christ in every ear that hears me.
Christ with me.

== Music ==
The music is in A minor, consisting of slow, marked crotchets at 72 per minute. The bars contain different even numbers of beats, from two, often used for general rests, to eight. The lower voices begin with divided altos and basses, which sing "Christ with me" four times in homophony with long rests in between. While they keep that pattern, the sopranos enter in the seventh bar to deliver the following text. From bar 17, the lower voices also take part in the text, singing "Christ in me". They are often juxtaposed with the sopranos, such as with "arise" vs. "sit down". A climax is reached in bar 33 when all the voices sing in homophony, and every one divided: "Christ in the heart ...". After the text is completed, followed by a general rest, all voices sing, similarly to the beginning: "Christ with me", once softly, finally very soft and diminishing.

== Performance and recording ==
In 2016, the Sixteen choir named a program of music by William Byrd and Pärt The Deer's Cry, which they performed in several venues and recorded on the CORO label. A collection of choral music by Pärt by the Estonian vocal group Vox Clamantis, conducted by Jaan-Eik Tulve, was performed under the same name. A reviewer notes the pure intonation required for the spiritual purity of the music. The British octet Voces8 released a recording in 2019 on their album After Silence I: Remembrance. In 2021, Chamber Choir Ireland and conductor Paul Hillier recorded a performance of The Deer's Cry for President Michael D. Higgins at Ireland's presidential residence Áras an Uachtaráin, for release on the President's online channels.
