= Jüri-Ruut Kangur =

Estonian conductor (born 1975)

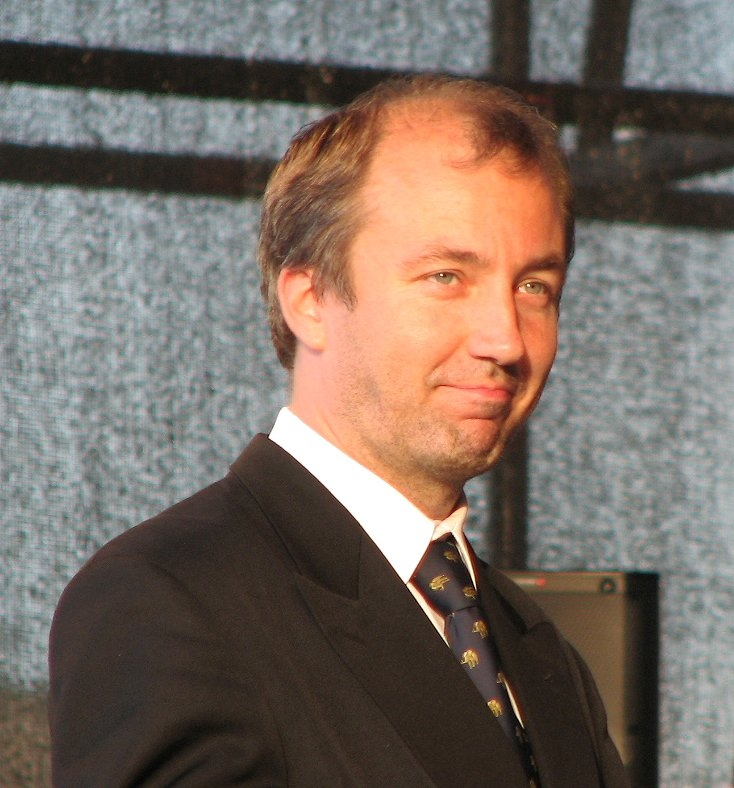
Jüri-Ruut Kangur

Jüri-Ruut Kangur (born 17 May 1975 in Tallinn) is an Estonian conductor.

== Life and career ==
In 1998, he graduated from Estonian Academy of Music and Theatre in choral conducting speciality.

He has founded and led several choirs and orchestras, including Haapsalu City Orchestra (1996–2004), Estonian National Opera Boys' Choir (2000–2002), Tallinn University Symphony Orchestra (2013–2019).

2009–2017, he was one of the organizers of Pärnu Music Festival and Järvi Academy.

Since 2019, he is the president of European Orchestra Federation.

As of about 2020, he is the chief conductor of Estonian National Youth Symphony Orchestra.
