= Priit Kolsar =

Estonian hip hop musician (born 1973)

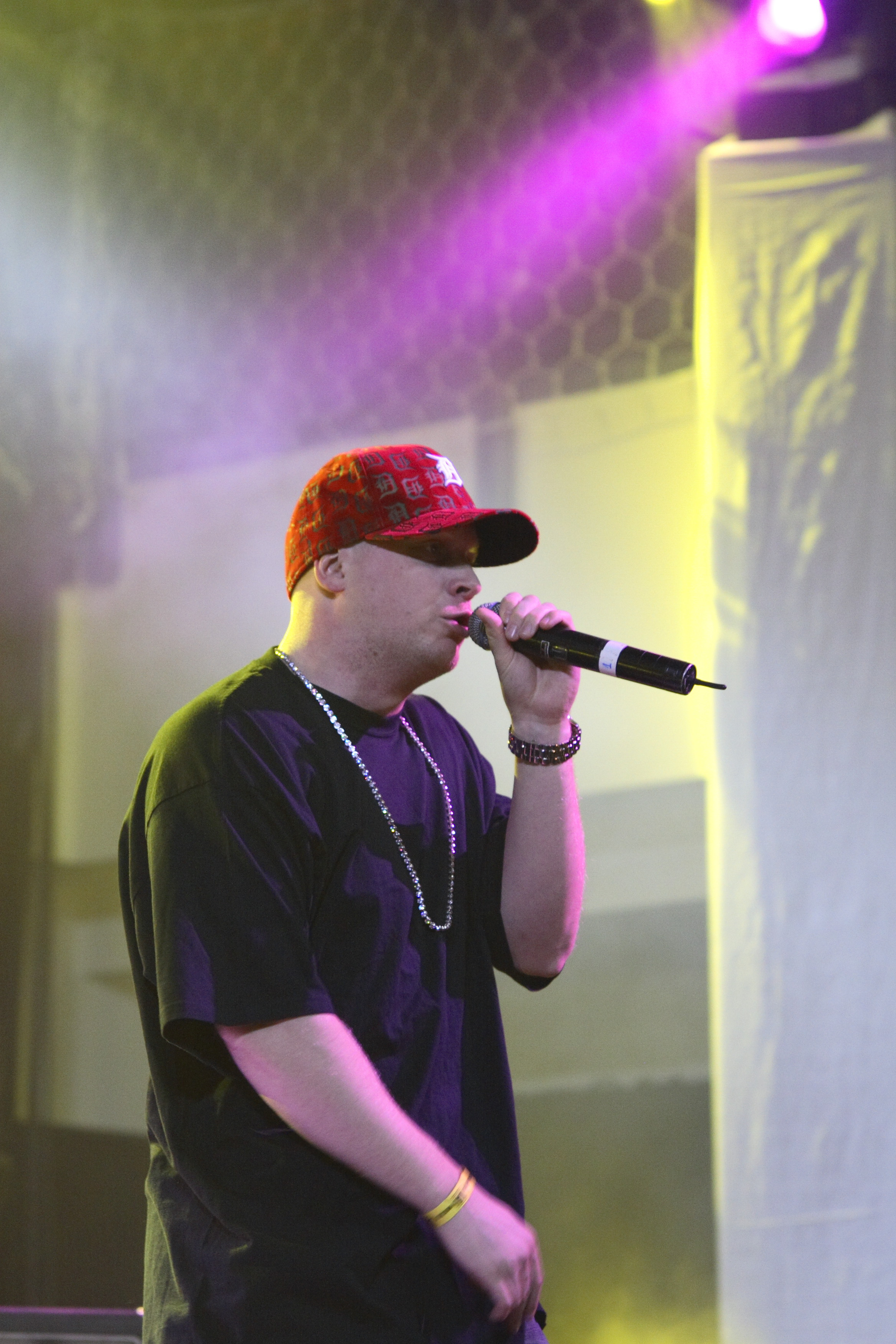
Cool D (2007)

Priit Kolsar (stage name Cool D; born 23 October 1976 in Tartu) is an Estonian hip hop musician.

Cool D has won several awards in Estonian Music Awards. In 2005 and 2006, he was named as "best male artist of the year".

== Discography ==
=== Albums ===
- 1995 – "O'culo"
- 1996 – "Sõnumid pimedusest"
- 1998 – "Saaga läheb edasi"
- 1999 – "Pahade planeet"
- 2001 – "Räpased riimid"
- 2004 – "Seenioride vabakava"
- 2005 – "Tütar üksi kodus"
- 2009 – "Cool FM"
- 2012 – "Tumeaine"
