= Toomas Vavilov =

Estonian clarinetist and conductor (born 1969)

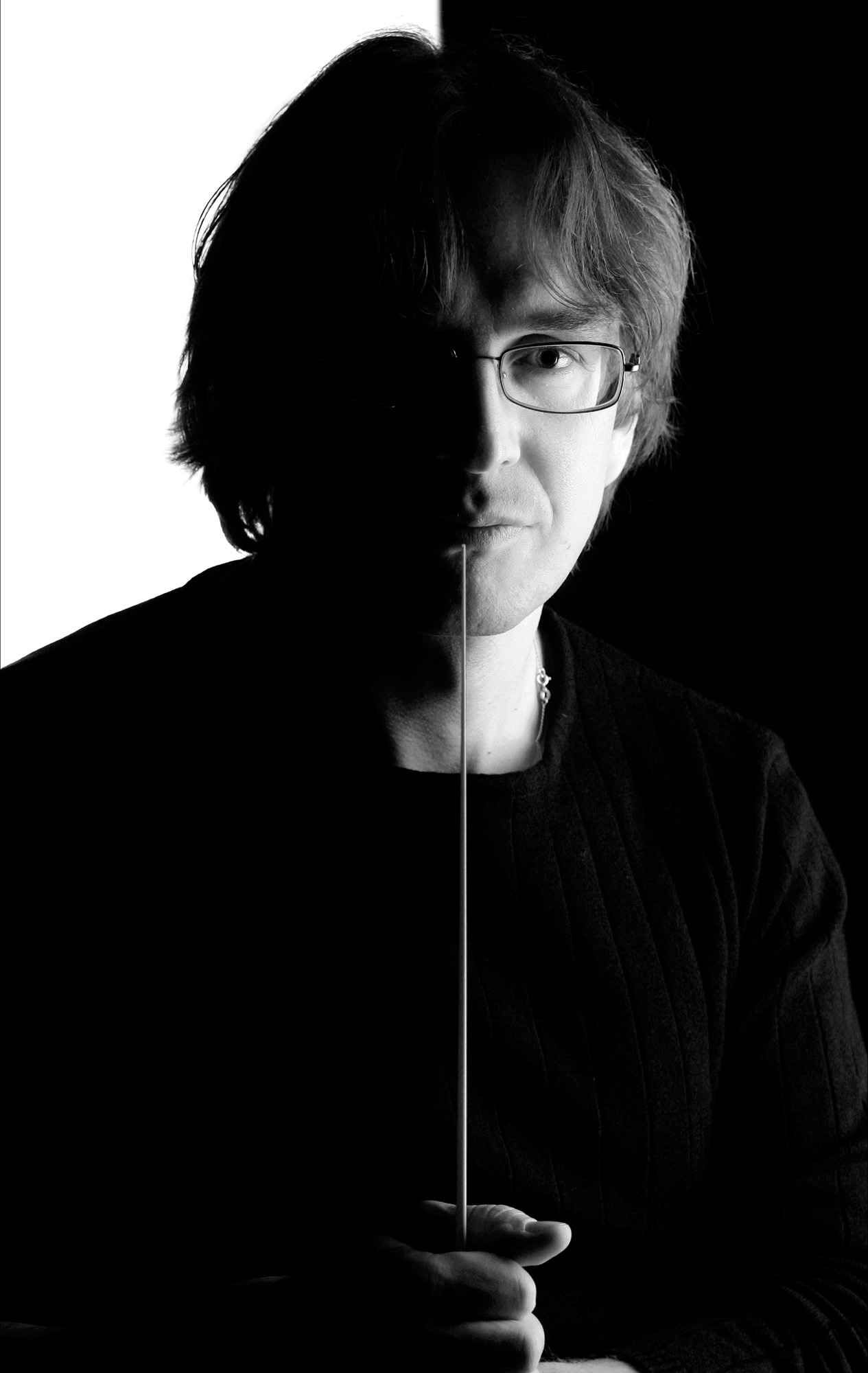
Toomas Vavilov in 2006

Toomas Vavilov (born 15 July 1969 in Tallinn) is an Estonian clarinetist and conductor. He is one of the well-known clarinetist of Estonia.

== Life and career ==
In 1992, he graduated from Estonian Academy of Music and Theatre, specializing in clarinet. 1996–1998, he also studied conducting at Estonian Academy of Music and Theatre.

2004–2006, he was the second conductor of Estonian National Symphony Orchestra. 2006–2008, he was the music director and the head conductor of the orchestra at Vanemuine Theatre.

He is a member of Association of Estonian Professional Musicians.

Awards:

- 1990: first prize at the Estonian Woodwind Players Contest
- 2001: Annual Prize of the Endowment of Music
