= Muusa =

2007 album by Laura Põldvere

Studio album by Laura Põldvere
- Released: September 1, 2007
- Label: Moonwalk

Laura Põldvere chronology
Muusa	Ultra (209)

Singles from Muusa
- 1. "Moonwalk" Released: 2005; 2. "Sunflowers" Released: 2007; 3. "Muusa" Released: 2007; 4. "581c" Released: 2008; 5. "Lihtsad asjad (feat. Raivo Tafenau)" Released: 2008

Muusa is the debut studio album by Estonian singer Laura Põldvere. The album was released on the first of September, 2007 by Moonwalk studios. It became one of the most successful albums in Estonia over the decade, selling over ten-thousand copies in 2007. The song, "Moonwalk" was performed at the Estonian Eurovision contest in 2005, in hopes of representing Estonia during the Eurovision song contest, the song reached second place. In 2007, Laura once again took part in the Eurovision song contest with the entry "Sunflowers". The song came in third place. Later that year, Laura's debut album "Muusa" was released, following the hit single, also named "Muusa".

== History ==
On September 1, 2007, Põldvere's official debut studio album was released. In October 2007, she performed the album at many clubs in Estonia. The album won the title of Album of the year during the Estonian Music Awards. Digitally the album became the highest-selling album of the year. On December 6, the music video for the song "Muusa" (directed by Kaimar Kukk) aired.

== Track listing ==
No.	Title	Length
1.	"Muusa"	3:36
2.	"Lunatic"	4:29
3.	"Sunflowers"	3:05
4.	"Sinu enda stoori"	3:26
5.	"Moonwalk"	3:21
6.	"581c"	5:01
7.	"Vihm"	3:40
8.	"Lihtsad Asjad"	3:24
9.	"Repriis"	1:49
10.	"One & One"	4:17
11.	"Predaator"	3:30
