= Riho Sibul =

Estonian singer and guitarist (1958–2022)

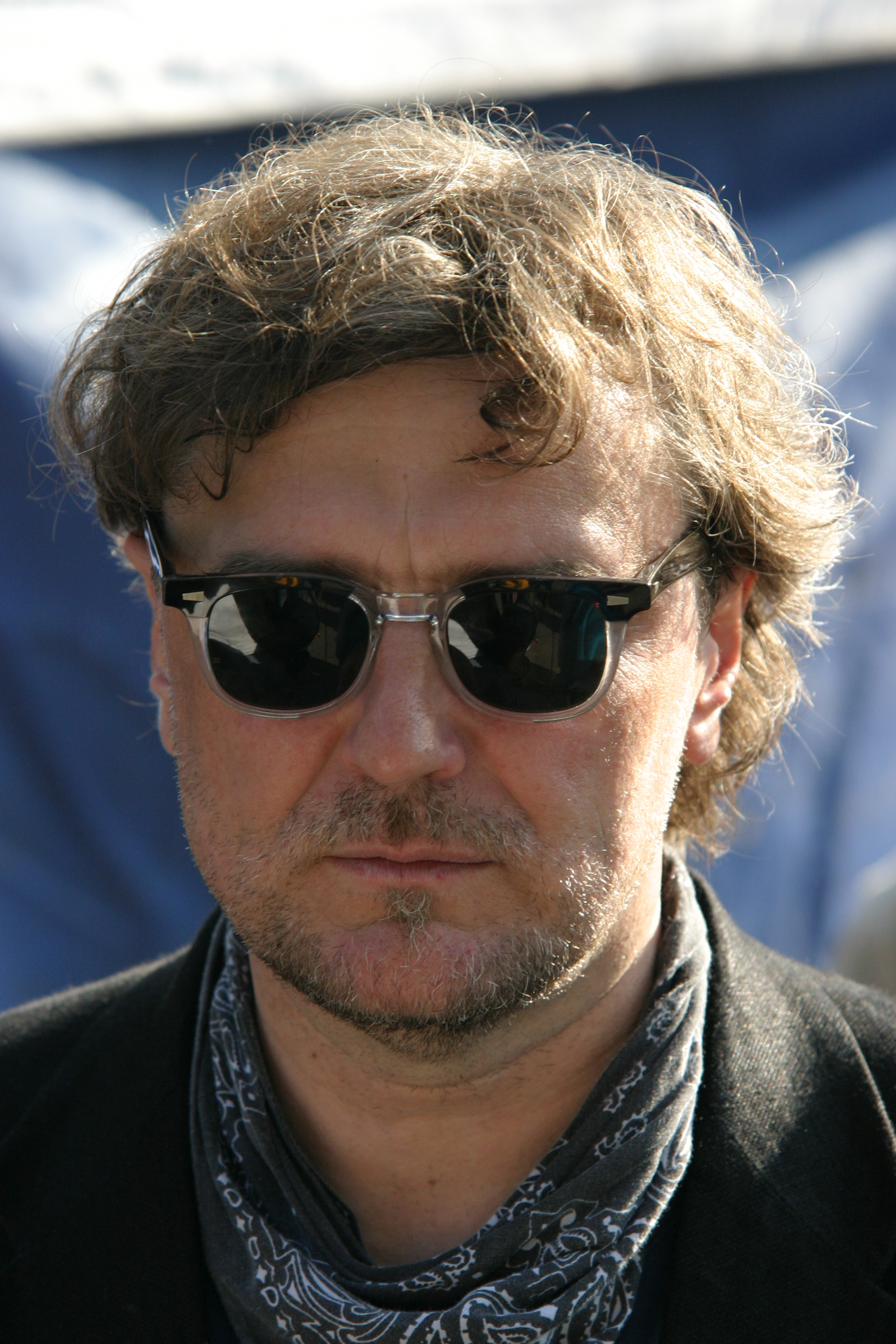
- Sibul in 2006

Background information
- Born: Riho Sibul; 26 June 1958; Rapla, then part of Estonian SSR, Soviet Union
- Died: 20 November 2022 (aged 64) Tallinn, Estonia
- Instruments: Guitar, vocals

Riho Sibul (26 June 1958 – 20 November 2022) was an Estonian singer and guitarist of the rock band Ultima Thule.

He received the Order of the White Star, 5th. Class.

Sibul died on 20 November 2022, at the age of 64.
