= Mihkel Poll =

Estonian pianist

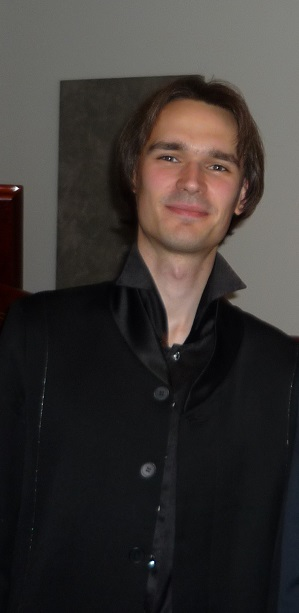
Mihkel Poll in 2012

Mihkel Poll (born 14 August 1986 in Tallinn) is an Estonian pianist trained at the Estonian Academy of Music and Theatre under Ivari Ilja.

Competition record
2002	(Latvia) Jāzeps Vītols IPC	2nd Prize
2004	(Italy) Rina Sala Gallo IPC	1st Prize
2006	(Estonia) Tallinn IPC	1st Prize
2006	(Spain) Cidade de Ferrol IPC	1st Prize
