= Jarek Kasar =

Estonian singer

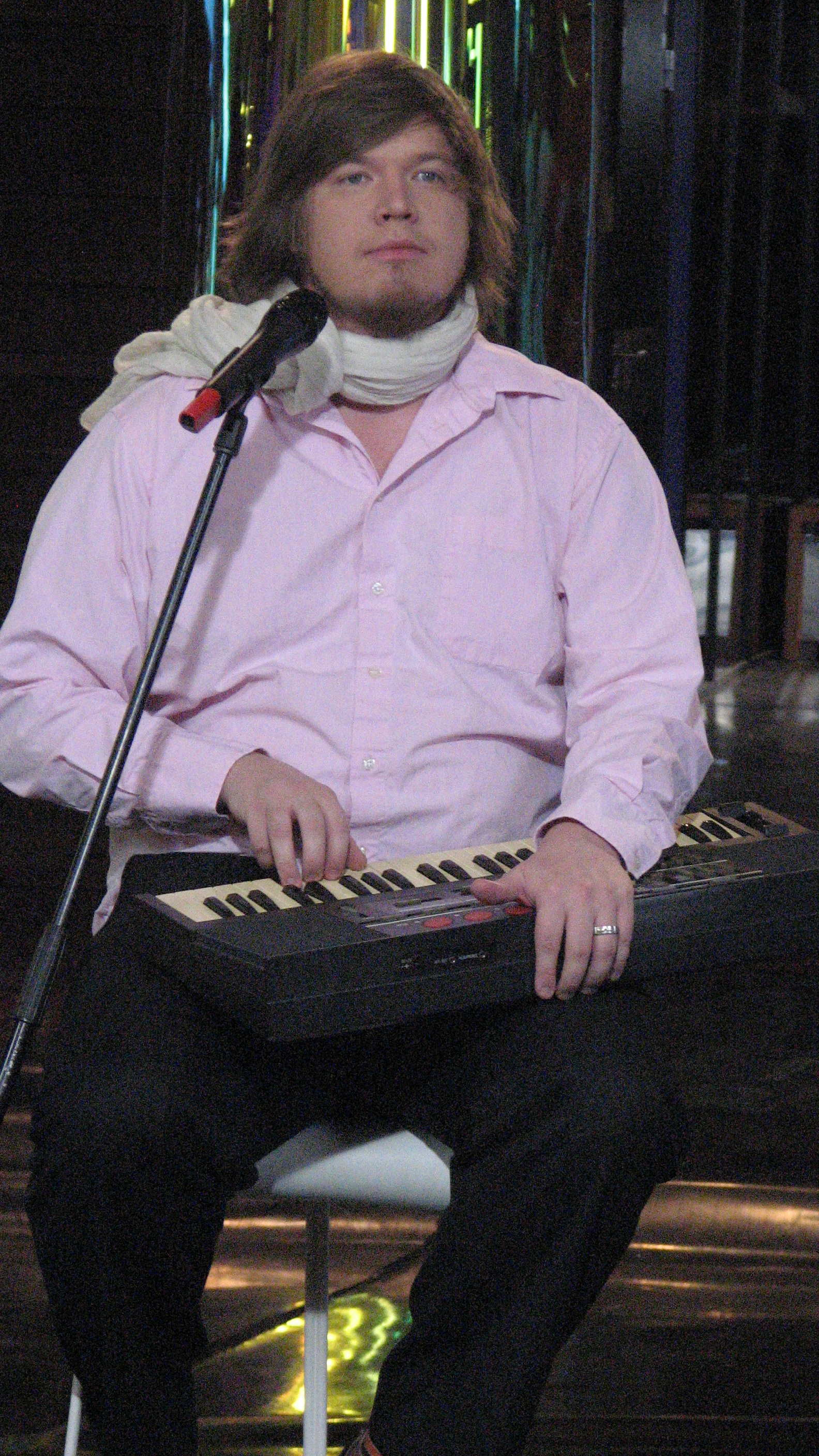
Chalice in 2012.

Jarek Kasar (also known by his stage name Chalice; born 3 April 1983) is an Estonian singer. He started his music career as a rapper.

== Discography ==
- Ühendatud inimesed (2003)
- Süsteemsüsteem (2005)
- Taevas ja perse (2007)
- Supervõimed (2008)
- Lärmakas naabrimees (2012)
- Liiga palju viiuleid (2014)
- ’’K R I B U K R A B U’’ (2020)
- ’’Oliver’’ (2024)
