= Villu Veski =

Estonian saxophonist

Villu Veski (born 19 January 1962) is an Estonian saxophonist.

Veski was born in Hellamaa on the island of Muhu. In 1985, he graduated from Tallinn State Conservatory in saxophone specialty. From 1982 to 2000 he was a saxophone and improvisation teacher at Georg Ots Tallinn Music School. From 1999 to 2006 he taught the same subjects at Tartu University's Viljandi Culture Academy, and from 2001 to 2003 at Estonian Academy of Music and Theatre.

He has been one of the organizers for several festivals and concerts – Estonian Concert's festival Saxomania, Muhu Future Music Festival "Juu Jääb", concert series Jazzruler@RockCafe.

Since 1983, he has been a saxophonist for Tallinn Saxophone Quartet.

He is a member of Association of Estonian Professional Musicians, and Estonian Jazz Union.

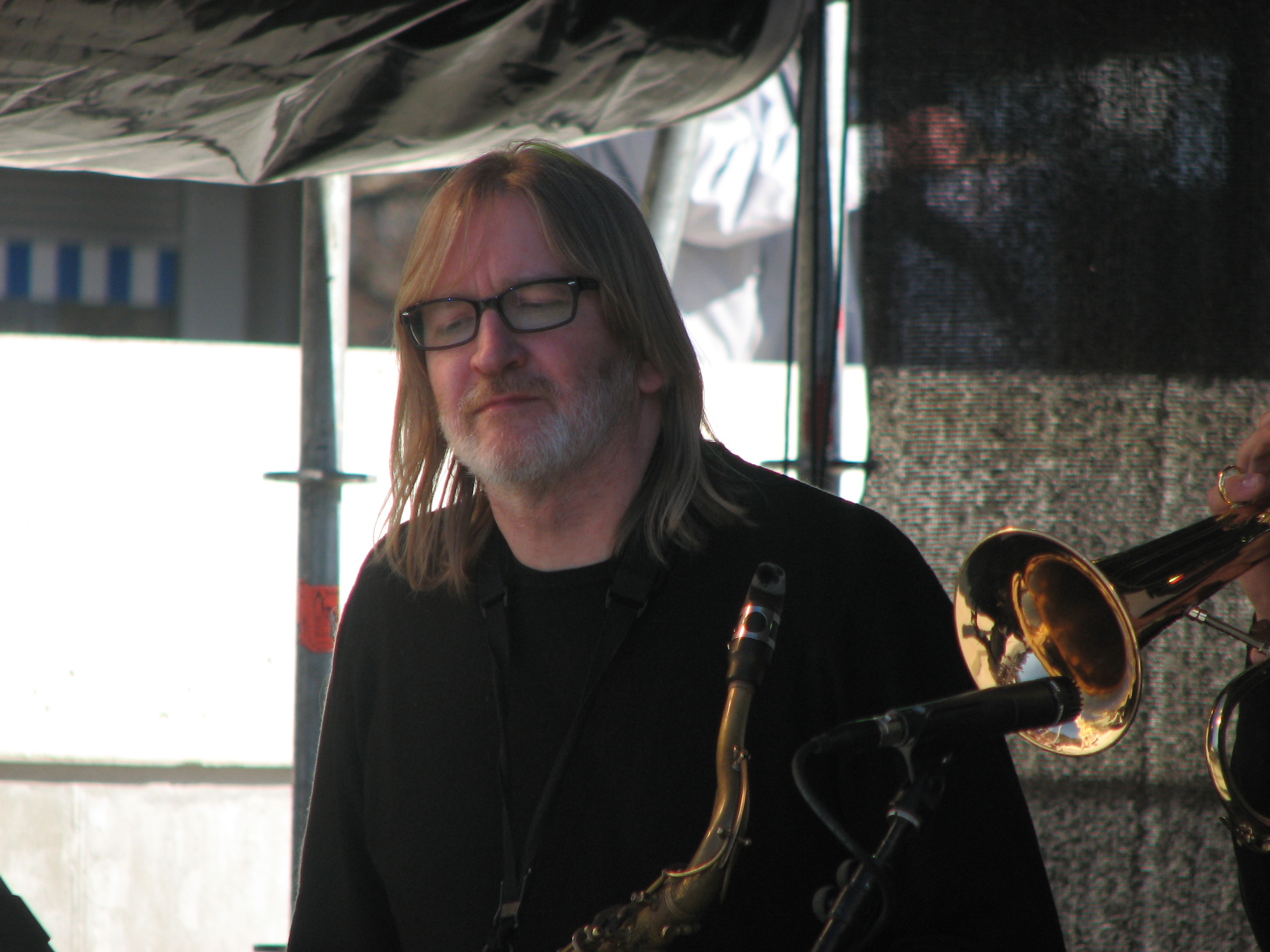
Villu Veski is an Estonian saxophonist.
