= NYYD Ensemble =

Music ensemble in Estonia

NYYD Ensemble is an Estonian contemporary music ensemble. It is named as the most prominent contemporary music ensemble in Estonia.

The ensemble was founded in 1993 by Olari Elts. The ensemble's artistic director and conductor is Olari Elts.

The ensemble has performed mainly 20th century music. Special focus is on works by Estonian composers, like Eino Tamberg, Erkki-Sven Tüür, Tõnu Kõrvits, Helena Tulve.

The ensemble has participated on many international festivals, including Warsaw Autumn, MaerzMusik, Aterforum Ferrera, Gaida.
