= Corelli Consort =

Corelli Consort is an Estonian baroque music ensemble. The ensemble is unique because it is using original historical instruments (from 17th–18th century): including baroque violins, traverse flute, baroque cello, viola da gamba, harpsichord, baroque bassoon, archiliuto. The ensemble is named after Italian composer Archangelo Corelli.

The ensemble was established in 1992.

Artistic director of the ensemble is Mail Sildos.

== Discography ==
- Beauty of history. Corelli Consort ajastu pillidel. Joseph Bodin de Boismortier, Michel Corrette, Georg Philipp Telemann, Jean-Philippe Rameau. Corelli Music, 2005.
- Jõulud iidses Tallinnas. Corelli Consort ajastu pillidel, sopran Kaia Urb. Arcangelo Corelli, Giuseppe Torelli, Francesco Manfredini, Alessandro Scarlatti. Corelli Music, 2007.
