= Tallinn Chamber Orchestra =

Estonian orchestra

Tallinn Chamber Orchestra (TCO, Estonian: Tallinna Kammerorkester) is a chamber orchestra located in Tallinn, the capital city of Estonia.

The orchestra was established in 1993 by the conductor Tõnu Kaljuste. The orchestra's music is mainly distributed by ECM Records, but also through other labels. The orchestra has performed in Argentina, Brazil, Canada, Japan, United States, and around Europe. They have performed at many music festivals, including the Bremen Music Festival, Budapest Autumn Festival, Torino Settembre Musical, and Tuusulanjärvi Festival.

During 2013–2019, the chief conductor of the orchestra was Risto Joost. From 2019, the chief conductor has again been Tõnu Kaljuste. Conductors who have worked with the orchestra include, internationally, Jaakko Kuusisto, Daniel Raiskin, John Storgårds, Richard Tognetti, Terje Tønnesen, and Valentin Zhuk. Estonian conductors of the orchestra include Jüri Alperten, Olari Elts, Kristjan Järvi, Risto Joost, Paul Mägi, Andres Mustonen, Vello Pähn, and Arvo Volmer.

In 2013, the orchestra was awarded the Estonian Music Council Prize. In 2014, Tõnu Kaljuste (as the conductor of orchestra) was given the Grammy Award for Arvo Pärt's "Adam's Lament".
