= Positivus Festival =

Music festival held in Latvia

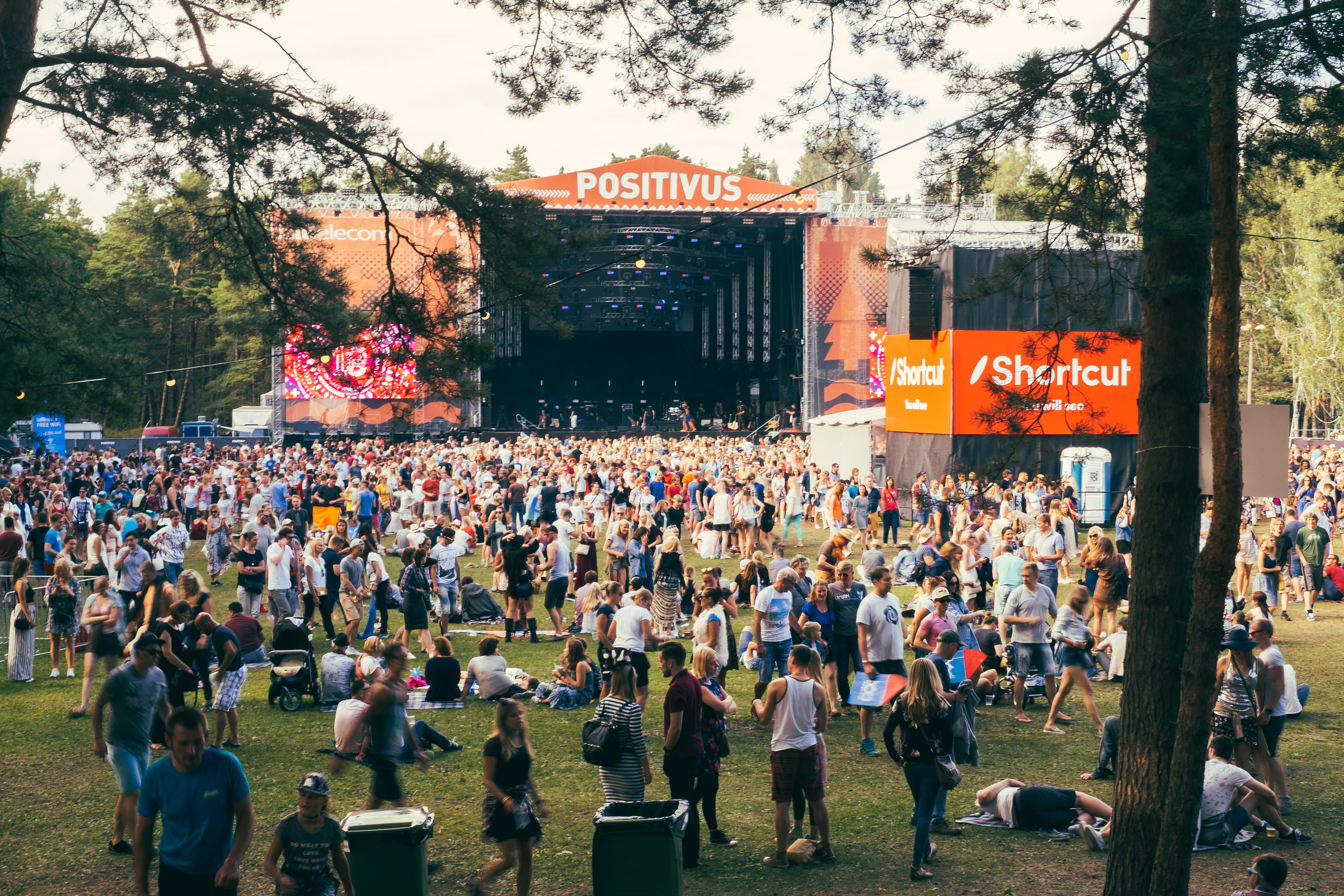
Main stage, 2016

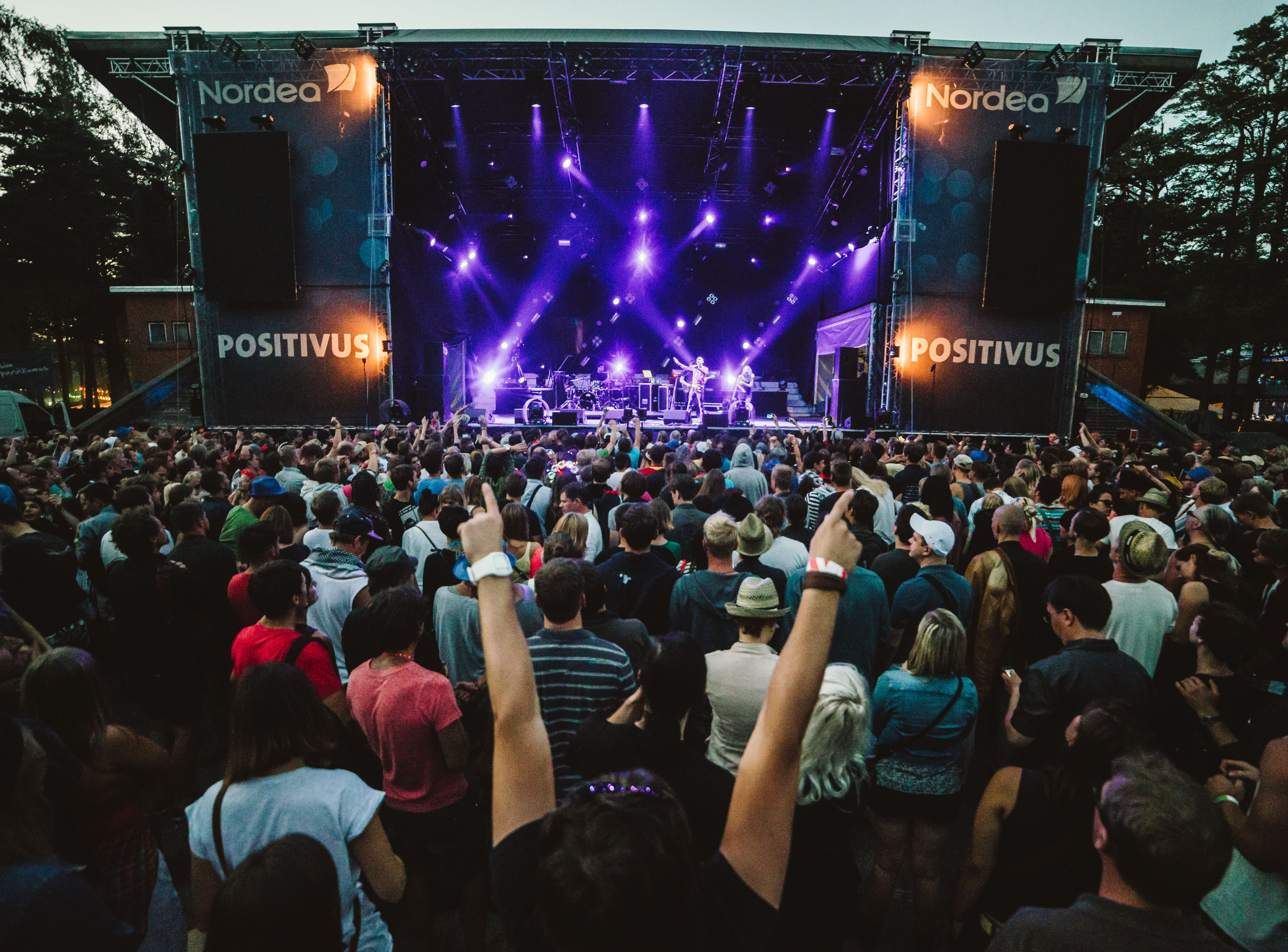
Second largest stage

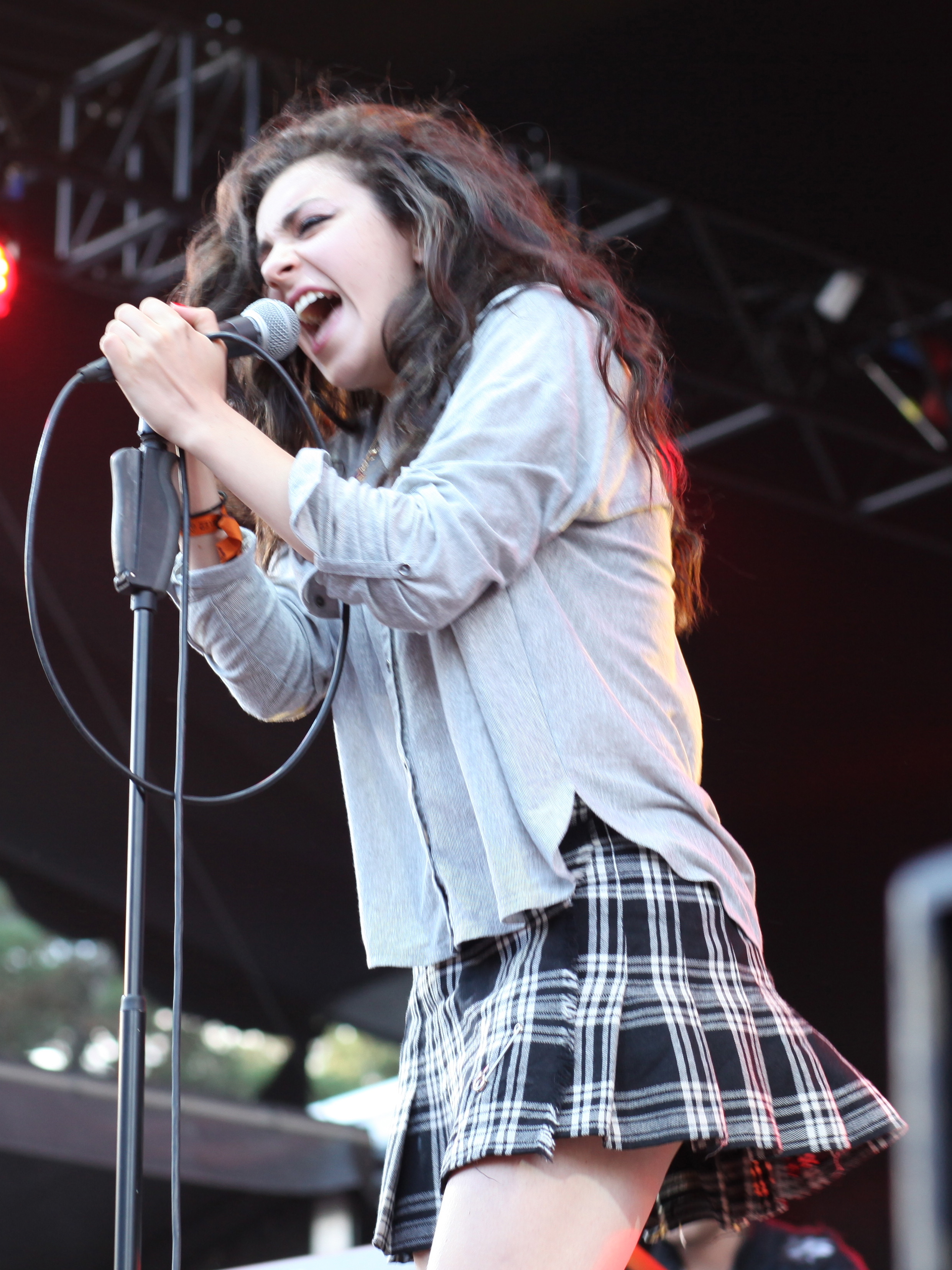
Charli XCX performing at Positivus Festival 2013

Positivus Festival (Latvian: Positivus festivāls) is an annual summer music and culture festival that was held in Salacgrīva from 2007 to 2019. After two cancelled editions due to the COVID-19 pandemic in Latvia, the festival moved to the capital city of Riga from 2022, In 2026 the festival became a one-day event in Mežaparks Great Bandstand, Riga with only 3 artists performing.

First held in 2007, Positivus combines a variety of genres, including indie, pop, folk, electronic and more styles in between. The festival is organized by Positivus Music. The festival in its early years took place during an extended weekend — from Thursday afternoon until Sunday morning of the third week of July. It is a festival with international chart toppers and underground emerging talent.

Over the years there have been up to six live stages featuring around 60–70 artists every year on average, most notably including Pixies, Alt-J, Ellie Goulding (multiple years), The Lumineers, Hot Chip, John Newman, Placebo, M83, Air, Iggy Pop, Tom Odell (multiple years), Elbow, Daughter, Kraftwerk, Bastille, The Kooks, Sigur Rós, Imagine Dragons, The XX, Hurts, OK Go, Muse and many others. The festival line-up usually consists of a number of chart topping artists as well as new performers from all over the world, with Latvian artists having a strong presence. At its Salacgriva location, the festival took place only 12 km from the Estonian-Latvian border and therefore saw a strong attendance of Estonian visitors, musicians, caterers, and marketers as well as festival personnel, rendering Positivus an unofficial yearly meeting of the two neighbour countries. Estonians called it "Estonia's biggest music festival in Latvia".

== Landscape ==
From 2007 through 2019, Positivus was held in the Latvian coastal town of Salacgrīva located between the A1 Via Baltica highway and the beach of the Riga Bay. The festival offered access to meadows, forests, the beach, as well as the local town of Salacgrīva.

== Camping ==
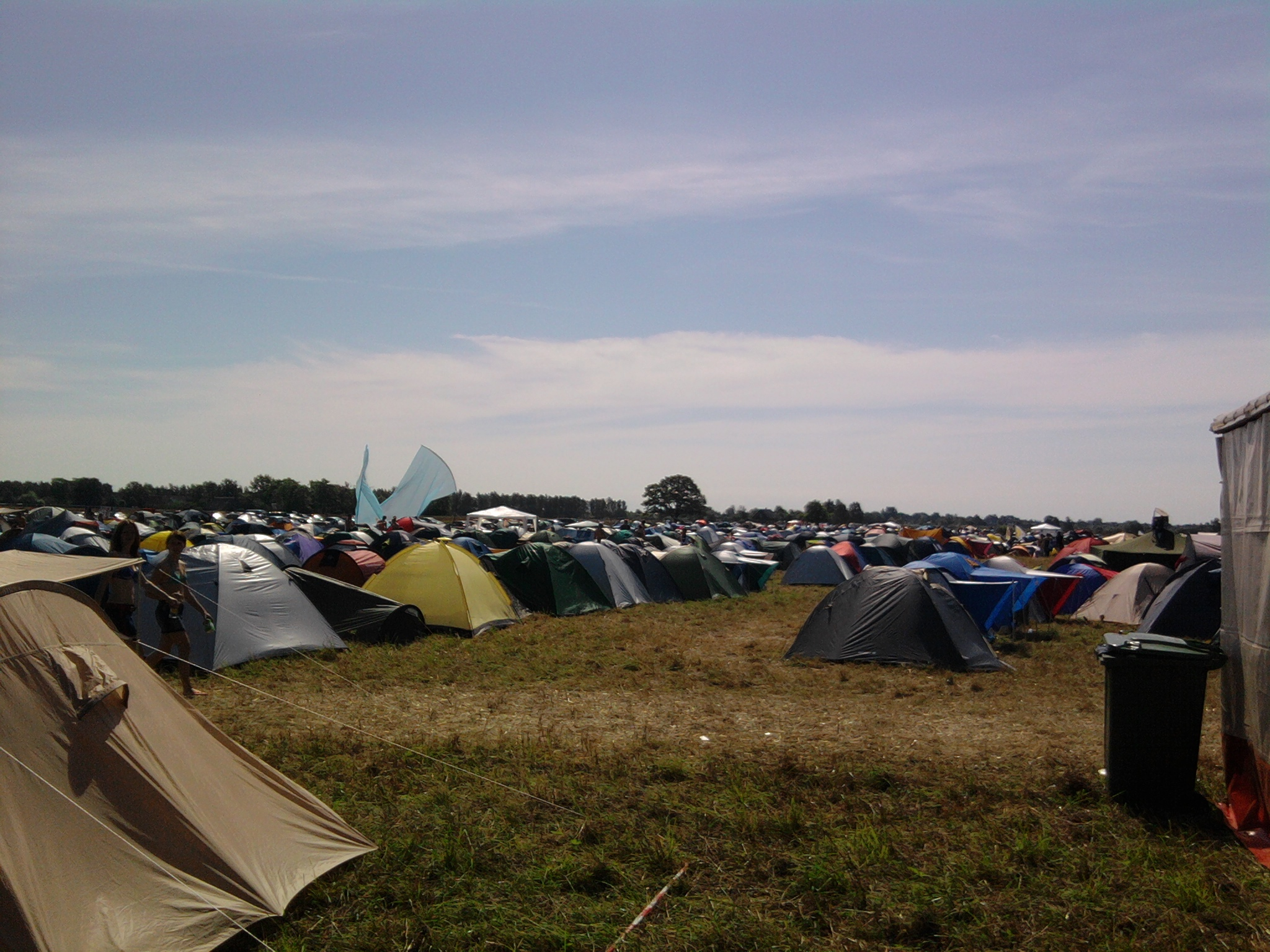
Camping area at Positivus festival

From 2007 through 2019, the festival camping site was located on the other side of the A1 Via Baltica road, directly across from the festival venue, and it was sponsored by Merrild Coffee, which provided complementary coffee refills for campers during the entire festival. The camping grounds also had catering services. The car parking was located within a short distance from the camping site. As of 2016, there was a separated area for caravans and trailer houses.

== Positivus Festival 2023 ==
The 2023 festival was held on July 14 and 15 in Lucavsala Park, Riga, Latvia. It was headlined by Sam Smith and Metro Boomin.

LMT Stage	Lāčplēsis Stage	Evolution Stage
July 14, 2023
Metro Boomin; JID; EARTHGANG; Emotional Oranges	Tommy Cash; Banda Banda; Elīza Legzdiņa; Bel Tempo; Miks Galvanovskis	Aminata; Laika Suns; Vēstnieks; Patrisha; Marko & Hottee; MC Apšaude; Grēta
July 15, 2023
Sam Smith; Alt-J; Gustavo	Little Big; Sleaford Mods; O.; Wiesulis; Martas Asinis	Mauku Sencis & Grandmasters Neons; Fiņķis; ZEĻĢIS; I MEAN LOVE; HUNN; Vultura; Perestroika

== Positivus Festival 2022 ==
The 2022 festival was held for the first time in Lucavsala Park in the capital city of Riga on July 15 and 16. It was headlined by ASAP Rocky, Megan Thee Stallion, and Jamie xx.

LMT Stage	Lāčplēsis Stage	Narvesen Stage
July 15, 2022
Jamie xx; Caribou; SoFaygo	Asaf Avidan; Yves Tumor & Its Band; Black Midi; Sudden Lights; Nē	Arturs Skutelis; Būū; rolands če; Grupa Sigma; PRUSAX; ZEĻĢIS; Ods; Elizabete Gaile
July 16, 2022
ASAP Rocky; Thundercat; Megan Thee Stallion; Ansis; Bas	The Avalanches (DJ set); Black Country, New Road; Tribes of the City; VIŅA; Gram-Of-Fun	Citi Zēni; Edavārdi; MUUD; Chris Noah; Wiesulis; $ourJ; Nova Koma

== Positivus Festival 2020 ==
The festival was canceled due to the COVID-19 pandemic.

== Positivus Festival 2019 ==
The festival took place on July 26–27, 2019.

=== Line-up ===
Main stage	Lāčplēsis stage
Friday, July 26
Disclosure; The 1975; ansis; Daddy Was a Milkman	Cut Copy; Elderbrook; Rick Feds; Bezgalībieši
July 27
Underworld; Royal Blood; Superorganism; Emma-Jean Thackray	Ivan Dorn; Ewert and The Two Dragons; Husky Loops; Adam Naas

== Positivus Festival 2018 ==
The festival took place on July 20–22, 2018.

=== Line-up ===
Main stage	Other stage	Piena svētki stage	Arts And Nature Stage
Friday, July 20
Years & Years; Tove Lo; NOËP	Ivan Dorn; Dead Furies		
Saturday, July 21
The Prodigy; Arturiks Šaginovs; Maigonis Stirnpisis; Imka. Shipsea. Nepariet	MESA; Youngr; Artikus Seksulikus; Rolandos Se Tankos|		
Sunday, July 22
Nick Cave and The Bad Seeds; Lauv; DaGamba	Confidence Man; Frankie Animal; Satellites LV; Rīgas Modes		

== Positivus Festival 2017 ==
The festival took place on July 14–16, 2017.

=== Line-up ===
Lattelecom Stage	Nordea Stage	Electric Room Stage	Palladium Stage	Arts And Nature Stage
July 14
Pixies; Maxïmo Park; Nothing But Thieves; Trad.Attack!	Grandmaster Flash; JP Cooper; Cigarettes After Sex; Margaret Glaspy; Get Your Gun	Aeroplane; AraabMuzik; Makree	Bandmaster; Singapūras Satīns; Edavārdi; Beyond Beyond; Chris Noah; Okym & Tiiu	Matīss Čudars; Riga Improvisation Theatre; DJ Music DJ; Polifauna; DJ Oriole & VJ Linda Konone; Kosmodisk; Mad Ant
July 15
Ellie Goulding; Rae Sremmurd; Kamasi Washington; Dzelzs Vilks	Austra; Rhye; L.A. Salami; DaGamba; Daddy Was A Milkman	Crookers; Kingdom; DJ Aspirīns vs DJ Toms Grēviņš; NOËP	Raimonds Tiguls and Moonlight Sound Design; Fakts; Teachers; Francobollo; Rachel Claudio & Rick Feds; Lepatriinu	Riga Improvisation Theatre; Comedy Latvia; Tehnikums; Viņa; Platon Buravicky; Pachamama Beats; Sign Libra; Āres
July 16
Alt-J; The Lumineers; José González	Mew; Ray BLK; Julia Jacklin; Pienvedēja Piedzīvojumi; Eska	Rudelies; Rīgas DJ Skola: DJ Dubra, DJ PM2Theam, DJ Aspirins	Satellites LV; Mesa; Bucharest; Go Away Bird; Mauno Meesit	Mārcis Auziņš; Sūdi; Tīna Šipkēvica; Woman Stand Up; Comedy Estonia; Kapelmeistars Group

== Positivus festival 2016 ==
The festival took place on July 15–17, 2016.

=== Line-up ===
Lattelecom stage	Nordea stage	Palladium stage	I Love You stage	Red Bull Music Academy stage	Arts and Nature stage
July 15
San Fermin; Years & Years; Hot Chip; Ellie Goulding	Rīgas Modes; Sofi Tukker; Ho99o9; Arthur Beatrice; Minor Victories; Richard Hawley; Mark Ronson	Grässhopas; Estrada Orchestra; Milk; Singapūras Satīns; Laika Suns; 20syl & Mr. J. Medeiros present AllttA; Mielavs un Pārcēlāji	Kristaps Bedrītis; The Boondocks; Chomsky Chess Club; Tehnikums; The Pink Elephant; NOËP; JoyCut; DJ Kārlis Dagilis	MakeMake; Mr. Nestor; Avoid Dave; Chloe Martini; Kashuks; DJ Craze; DJ Slow; Two	Kikit; ImproZoo; Elizabeta Lāce; Ezeri; Starmetis; 7Synths
July 16
Baio; Joss Stone; Latvian Radio Big Band & Ralfs Eilands; John Newman; M83	Super Besse; Alise Joste; Dzelzs Vilks; C Duncan; Seinabo Sey; Mercury Rev	Ouu; I Wear* Experiment; Bandmaster; Postaal; Liima; Satellites LV; Skyforger; Ozols	Mionia; Kasetes; Blue House; Howling Owl; Irving Ark; Židrūns; Pienvedēja Piedzīvojumi; DJ Pēteris Bajārs	Smthing Smthing; Mario Moretti; NiklāvZ; Dave Storm & Stee Downes; Fingalick & Vaiper; Mike Skinner & MURKAGE present TONGA; Branko; Cartoon; MHKL & Quest	I-DEJAS MĀJA morning workout Prieka Ministrija; Art-i-šok; Comedy Latvia; Riga Improvisation Theatre; Anneli Arro; Vladislavs Nastavševs; Coals; Colin Johnco; Northern C MMMM; Gas Of Latvia; Tonik Ensemble; Indriķis Ģelzis
July 17
Carnival Youth; Hælos; Charles Bradley & His Extraordinaires; Wolf Alice; Air; Iggy Pop	Choir of Young Believers; The Japanese House; The Very Best; Oh Wonder; Grimes	Frankie Animal; Lexsoul Dancemachine; Kali Briis Band; Daddy Was A Milkman; Cigarettes After Sex; Reiks; DaGamba	THE ROOP; Kashuks; Markas Palubenka; Brothers Water; Erki Pärnoja: Himmelbjerget	Kaminsky; Alaska; KAMP! Sander Mölder	I-DEJAS MĀJA morning workout Comedy Estonia; Orbīta - Slow Show FM; Reinis Jaunais; Levīti; HANA; Anna Pluto; Regīna; Sūdi

== Positivus festival 2015 ==
The event took place on July 17–19, 2015.

=== Line-up ===
Lattelecom stage	Nordea stage	Palladium stage	I Love You stage	Red Bull Music academy	Dabas stage
July 17
Eugene "Hideaway" Bridges & Coolmans Report; Everything Everything; Jungle; Tom Odell; Placebo				DJ Ai-Va; Without Letters; Dorian Concept Trio; Break Da Funk; Camo & Krooked; DJ Sliink; DJ Quest & Paul Oja	
July 18
Dagamba+Sinfonietta Rīga+Juventus; King Gizzard & the Lizard Wizard; Ewert and the Two Dragons; Warpaint; Kasabian				Mr. Nestor; Niklāvz; Formacja; Avoid Dave; Dave Storm; Egyptian Lover; Breach; Grind Live	
July 19
Basement Jaxx; St. Vincent; Fenech-Soler; Robert Plant & the Sensational Space Shifters	Elliphant			Münzpauzn; Bandmaster; Mr. Krime; Smthing Smthing	

== Positivus festival 2014 ==
The event took place on July 18–20, 2014.

=== Line-up ===
Lattelecom stage	Nordea stage	Palladium stage	I Love You stage	Red Bull Music academy
July 18
FM Belfast; The Horrors; You Me At Six; Phantogram; Elbow	Birth of Joy; Junip; Laura Mvula; Future Islands; Audience Killers	Cherub; K.Remonts; Pompeya; The Sound Poets; Daniel Levi; Freaks on Floor	The Citizens; Pyro Trees; Tallinn Daggers; Big Wave Riders; Get Your Gun; Carnival Youth; Kārlis Dagilis	Just Blaze; Rebeka; Oriole; Napo; Temper Temple; Dave Storm; Nick Hook; MHKL & K-Sein; Vaiper Despotin
July 19
And So I Watch You From Afar; Daughter; Anna Calvi; Ellie Goulding; Kraftwerk	Tricky; Pharoah Sanders Quartet; Dzelzs Vilks Jauno Jāņu orķestris Kid Karate; King Charles; Carnival Youth	Audience Killers; The Dumplings; Sons of Noel and Adrian; Trad.Attack! Wilhelm; Marten Kuningas	Stefan Rausch; Garbanotas Bosistas; Starmetis; Junk Riot; Super Besse; Rubenis, Eihmanis & Helmss; Pēteris Bajārs; Martas asinis	Niklavz; DJ All-viss; Leslie Da Bass; Avoid Dave; Full Crate X Mar; DJ Quest; Paul Oja; A-Trak
July 20
MØ; Aluna George; The 1975; Bastille; The Kooks	Junk Riot; Justina Lee Brown; Latvian Blues Band; NONONO; Of Montreal; Chet Faker; Temples	Argo Vals; Kali Briis; Three Leg Dog; The Velvet Supernova; Pikaso; Rīgas modes Manta	Nē; Vincent Long; The Sinclair Sinclair; Das Sonntags Legion; Laika suns Frankie Animal	Margaret; Sander Mölder; DFRNT; Mr Nestor

== Positivus festival 2013 ==
In 2013 for the first time ever the festival lasted for three days, taking place on July 19–21, 2013.

=== Line-up ===
TELE2 stage	Nordea stage	I Love You stage	Palladium stage	Red Bull Music academy	Dabas stage
July 19
Crystal Castles; Noah and the Whale; Iiris; Elektro Guzzi	Twenty One Pilots; Zodiaks; Palma Violets; Rasabasa; Elephants From Neptune	Colours of Bubbles; Franco Franco; Andis Grīva; Deeper Upper; Parára; Laika suns	Mikus Frišfelds; Milk; Luministic; Very Cool People; Elephants From Neptune; Satellites LV	DJ RAPA; Oogle Vision; Kwazar; OYT; Mr. Nestor; Jesse & Jimi Tenor; Eltron John; Jack Beats; Riton; DJ Quest & Paul Oja	Kristaps Bedrītis; Treeeye; Du Duo; Pyro Trees; Alise Ģelze
July 20
Sigur Rós; Imagine Dragons; Jauns mēness Willy Moon; Latvian Blues Band	C2C; Charli XCX; John Grant; Pienvedēja piedzīvojumi	Zebra Island; Momend; Carnival Youth; Sibyl Vane; Alise Joste; Markas Palubenka; Them Lemons	Jagaspace; Paabel; I Wear* Experiment; Wolfredt; Galvanic Elephants; Candy Empire; Faun Racket; Outloudz	Halfbrother; Fingalick; Elvi/Dunian; Shotman; Kamp! Firejose; B. Bravo; MJ Cole; Artwork; Superskankers	Samba De Riga; Sus Dungo; Martas asinis Audience Killers; Y Silent
July 21
The xx Two Door Cinema Club; Michael Kiwanuka; Tom Odell; Team Ghost; French Films	Darwin Deez; Suuns !!! Efterklang; No Ceremony; Laime pilnīga	Without Letters; Anete Kozlovska; Bernības milicija Odd Hugo; Stūrī zēvele Tribes of the City	The Stanleys; Age of Stones; Komjaunatne; Kurak; Oranžās brīvdienas The Sound Poets; Laime pilnīga		Kaktiņš un Stūrītis; Indygo; The Coco'Nuts; Elizabete Balčus

== Positivus festival 2012 ==
The event took place on 20 and 21 July 2012.

=== Line-up ===
TELE2 stage	Nordea stage	Palladium stage	I Love You stage	Red Bull Music academy
July 20
Friendly Fires; Housse de Racket; Instrumenti; Keane; Niki & the Dove	King Charles; Lucy Rose; Vondelpark; Iļģi; 2:54	The Wow; Black Apple Market; Laime Pilnīga; Rīga Metro; Triānas parks Astro'n'out; Baložu pilni pagalmi Galaxy Bosons; Talbot; The Big Bluff; Freaks on Floor	Alise Joste; Markas Palubenka; Mimicry; Rasabasa; Tramplīni; Audience Killers; Mācītājs on Acid; Tenfold Rabbit; Zig Zag; Momend	Brockenchord; DJ Quest; Downtown Party Network; Dave Storm; Kienra & ЯVRS; DJ Rapa; Full Crate & Mar; DJ Zinc
July 21
Ewert and The Two Dragons; Givers; Manic Street Preachers; SBTRKT; Skyforger; The Vaccines	Damien Rice; Cashier No. 9 Jamie N Commons; Wild Beasts; Brodka; Kuchenbeat; Fanfarlo	Abraham's Cafe; Elephants From Neptune; Animal Drama	ESKIMO; Sibyl Vane; The Sound Poets; Zebra Island; Elizabete Balčus	Toms Grēviņš; Jesse Boykins III; Sander Molder; Tiger Milk; Mr. Nestor; Oyt; Tiger&Woods; Tom Middleton; Hudson Mohawke; Lunice; ELVI/DUNIAN

== Positivus festival 2011 ==
The event took place on 15 and 16 July 2011.

=== Line-up ===
TELE2 stage	Cēsu Alus stage	I Love You stage	Red Bull Music academy	Tallinn Music Week Stage
July 15
Yoav; Gustavo; Hurts; Editors	Freak Owls; Dry the River; Alina Orlova; Pulled Apart by Horses; Frankie & Heartstrings; Tunng	Frekvence; Kārlis Kazāks; HMP? Parara; ZRYA; Das Sonntags Legion; Goran Gora and The Yrs; Malcolm Lincoln	The Gaslamp Killer; Mondo in Stereo; Bassline Riga; Mr. Nestor; BrassBastardz; Mad Mats	Mimicry; Aides; Nevesis; Junk Riot; Kreatiivmootor; Badass Yuki
July 16
Satellites LV; King Charles; OK Go; Mark Ronson & The Business Intl. James; Röyksopp	Auļi; Dzelzs Vilks; Iiris; Ewert and the Two Dragons; Alcoholic Faith Mission; Chapel Club; Glasser; Beach House	Aparāts; Momend; Bērnības milicija Starmetis; Acid rain Andis Grīva; Colours of Bubbles; Lie Lie Sister; Black Apple Market; The Mundane	Scratch Perverts; Crystal Sound System; Kaur Kareda; Renegades of Bump; Oyt; Big Sensation; Innocent Sorcerers	

== Positivus festival 2010 ==
The festival was held on 16 and 17 July 2010.

=== Line-up ===
TELE2 stage	Cēsu Alus stage	I Love You stage
July 16
The Climbers; Ten Bears; Happy Mondays; Unkle	Triānas parks Shoreline; Happyendless; The Gin Riots; Lady Daisey; Popidiot; Astro'n'out	Soundarcade; Zizzou; Lie Lie Sister; Bad Apples; Alise Joste; Mona De Bo
July 17
Autumn Owls; ASIWYFA; Scissor Sisters; Muse	Svjata Vatra; Prince and Crosby; The Miserable Rich; EIMIC; Goran Gora; Giullia y Los Tellarini; Kira Kira; Stornoway	Martin Confused; 100 White Souls; El Mars; S.P.B. Sons of Noel and Adrian; Tramplīni; Ewert and the Two Dragons

== Positivus festival 2009 ==
The festival was held on 17 and 18 July 2009.

=== Line-up ===
TELE2 stage	Cēsu Alus stage	I Love You stage	Space Dog tent
July 17
Sons of Noel and Adrian; The Tiger Lillies; Prāta vētra Reigani	Bedwetters; Laime pilnīga The Happy Endings; Two Door Cinema Club; Pete Doherty; Pop Beats Poetry	Voiceks Voiska; S.P.B. Gaujarts; Hospitāļu iela Mona De Bo; Kārlis Kazāks	Čipsis un Dullais; All Day Long; Septiņi pieauguši vīrieši
July 18
Instrumenti; Ebony Bones; The Whip; Moby	Dahling; Dun Dun; The Mundane; Zig Zag; The Hobos; Dzeltenie Pastnieki; Jurga; The Leisure Society; Sinéad O'Connor	Acid Rain; Them Lemons; Maripossa; Martin Confused; El Mars; Satellites LV	Sound Religion; Striķis; Kuchenbeat

== PositivusAB 2008 ==
The festival was held from 18 to 19 July 2008. It was attended by approximately 18,000 people.

=== Stages ===
- AB Stage – where all 4 headliners as well as others performed
- TELE2 Stage – where the majority of the bands performed
- Shark dance tent – was open during the night
- Mamma Daba Kušš Tuss tent – a minor stage featuring musical, literary and theatrical performances

=== Line-up ===
AB Stage	TELE2 Stage	Shark dance tent
July 18
I'm From Barcelona; Travis; Manic Street Preachers	Živile; Astro'n'out; The Briefing; Mitsoura; Satellites LV; Iļģi	Timo Maas
July 19
Voiceks Voiska; Gorbachov; Mofo; Gustavo; Fatboy Slim	Land; Mild; Livingstones; Kuchenbeat; Mona De Bo; Nohow; Inokentijs Mārpls; Pienvedēja piedzīvojumi My Federation; British Sea Power	

=== Line-up ===
18 July

- Bogdan Taran
- DJ Sun from Lithuania

19 July

- Jānis Krauklis

== PositivusAB 2007 ==
It was the first PositivusAB festival. The festival was held from 27 to 28 July 2007.

=== Line-up ===
AB stage	BBC stage
July 27
Sigma; Goran Gora; Brett Anderson; Mumiy Troll	Otra Puse; Backflow; Malcolm McLaren; Badly Drawn Boy
July 28
Mofo; DJ Lethal; The Concretes; Stereophonics; James	Martin Confused; S.P.B. R.A.P. Satellites LV; Tribes of the City; Hospitāļu iela The Sun
