= Laime Pilnīga =

Latvian rock band

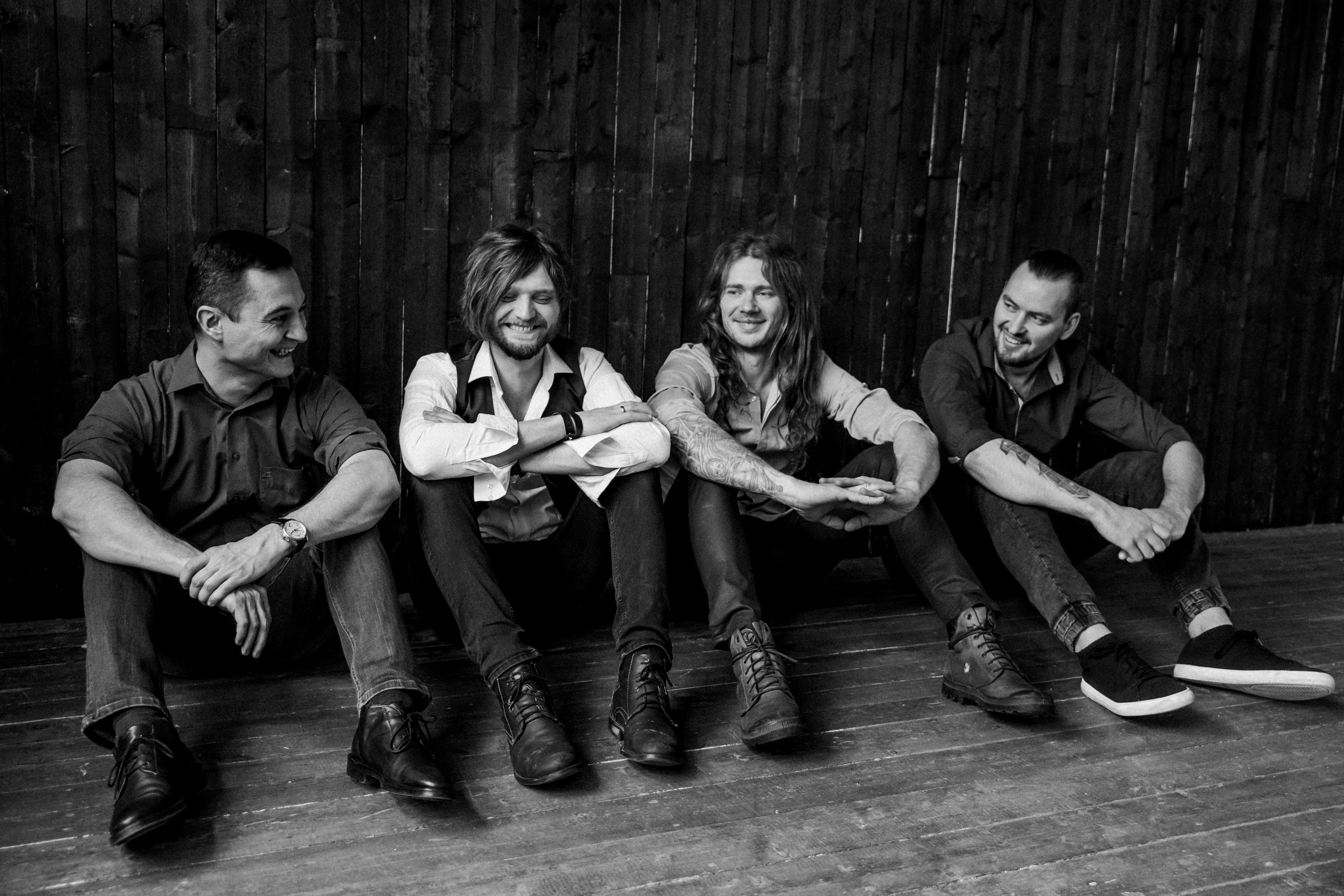

Background information
- Origin: Latvia
- Genres: Rock
- Years active: 2006–present
- Labels: Wold Recording Studios
- Members: Ervīns Ramiņš (vocals); Mārcis Vasiļevskis (guitar); Jānis Olekšs (bass); Elvijs Mamedovs (drums)
- Past members: Reinis Sējāns; Reinis Ozoliņš

Laime Pilnīga is a Latvian rock band formed in 2006 in Riga, Latvia. The most popular songs of Laime Pilnīga are "Sirdsapziņa" ('Conscience'), "I'm In Love with the Money", "On the Road" and "Hold On". Laime Pilnīga has travelled through and performed in most of the Europe, they have received multiple international awards and have been evaluated by many critics. The band has released 3 albums in total—Dual (2011), LP (2015) and Synergy and Waterlilies (2018)—all have been nominated as "The Best Rock Recordings" at the Annual Latvian Music Recording Awards.

== Members ==
- Ervīns Ramiņš (vocals) (born 1 December 1984)
- Mārcis Vasiļevskis (guitar) (born 16 February 1987)
- Jānis Olekšs (bass) (born 11 July 1986)
- Elvijs Mamedovs (drums & percussions) (born 1 April 1981)

Laime Pilnīga consists of professional musicians. Ervīns Ramiņš has a master's degree at Jāzeps Vītols Latvian Academy of Music and is now the head of and a vocal coach at BJMK Rock School in Jelgava. Mārcis Vasiļevskis has graduated the Riga Secondary School No. 110 where he learned how to play saxophone. Mārcis has won first place in such competitions as "Rock'n'Riga" and "Guitar Day" in 2010. He has studied music in London and simultaneously works as a session musician from time to time. The bass player Jānis Olekšs has studied tourism at the University of Latvia and he also works as a session musician in many projects with other Latvian musicians. Meanwhile, the drummer Elvijs Mamedovs works in a finance field and has a bachelor's degree in music pedagogy.

== History ==
Ervīns and Mārcis started the band in 2004 with inspiration from '70s rock music. Reinis Sējāns, who is now a member of a well-known Latvian band Instrumenti, was playing drums in Laime Pilnīga at that time. He was also the one who came up with the name of the band. Reinis Ozoliņš from the band Alaska Dreamers played bass and was in the first set of members, too. Later on, the set of members changed. The other two members—Jānis and Elvijs—joined Laime Pilnīga in 2006, and there have been no changes ever since. That year Laime Pilnīga performed publicly with the current members for the first time and it was at a celebratory concert for the 25-year anniversary of the Latvian band Pērkons. In 2007 the band started performing all around Latvia.

== Achievements ==
The band's achievements are:

- 1st place in the recording studio's competition "MicRec Open" and first single "Hey Babe" release (2007)
- 1st place in 2 international competitions held in Latvia – "MTV Coca-Cola Soundwave" and "Rock Legion" (2008)
- Performance at Coke Live Music Festival in Kraków, Poland (2008)
- Performance at Be2gether festival in Lithuania (2008)
- Music video for "I'm in love with the money" (2008)
- 2nd place in Sony and Nissan organized "Urband Playground" competition (2008)
- Warm-up act for a Russian rock band Mumiy Troll in Arena Riga (2009)
- Music video for "Sirdsapziņa" in collaboration with Igors Linga (2009)
- Performance at the biggest local festivals in Latvia – "Positivus", "Baltic Beach Party" and "Fonofest" (2009)
- Release of a debut album "Dual" (2011)
- Nominations in 2 categories at the Annual Latvian Music Recording Awards "Golden Microphone" – "The Debut of the Year" and "The Best Rock Album of the Year" (2011)
- Performance at Volt festival in Hungary (2011)
- Music video for "Terror Woman" in collaboration with a young director Rolands Vilcāns (2011)
- Concert in 2 parts at "Artelis" theatre (2013)
- Music video for "On the Road" with directors Alexander Sugak and Artjym Vidzemsky (2013)
- Warm-up act for Jake E. Lee Red Dragon Cartel (USA) in Budapest, Hungary (2014)
- Warm-up act for Three Days Grace (CAN) at Palladium in Riga, Latvia (2015)
- Second album LP release (2015)
- Nomination for the second album as "The Best Rock Recording of the Year" in Latvia (2015)
- "Kopā brīvi" ('Freely together') as an official soundtrack for a series of documentaries about Latvian rock music (2016)
- "World of Calculation Tour" with concerts in Latvia, Germany and the Netherlands (2016)
- The biggest video project for the band—music video for "Hold on"—in collaboration with the director Ermīns Baltais and his team (2017)
- Third album Synergy and Waterlilies release and a concert at K.K. fon Stricka villa (Riga, Latvia) (2018)
- "Synergy and Waterlilies" tour (2018)
- Nomination for "Synergy and Waterlillies" as "The Best Rock or Metal Recording of the Year" in Latvia (2019)
- "Awe" single release (2019)
- 3rd place in Latvian contest "Supernova" final for choosing a representative for Eurovision 2019 (2019)
- Release of a single "Pacēlums" (2019)

== Albums ==
Dual (2011)

In 2010 the band started working on their first studio album Dual. It consists of 10 compositions—2 of them already played live and previously recorded in 2008 with the help of the sound engineer and producer Alexander Volk at Wolk Recording Studios and 8 new songs which were recorded in the summer of 2010 with the sound engineer Gatis Zaķis at Sound Division Studios. The album is mixed at Wolk Recording Studios and Studio "Mute" and mastered at Optimum Mastering Studio in Great Britain. Cover design was provided by Vladimirs Korsuns.

LP (2015)

The second album LP which also includes 10 songs was released on 24 April 2015. In comparison with the previous recording this was specifically intended as a conceptual album with inspiration from George Orwell's works and events happening in the world at that time. The work on this record began in the summer of 2014 and went on till the beginning of 2015. The album was fully recorded with the help of sound engineer and producer Alexander Volk at his Wolk Recording Studios. Design by Elvijs Pūce.

Reviews:

- Sandris Vanzovičs (NRA) https://nra.lv/izklaide/141480-recenzija-laime-pilniga-lp.htm ;
- Aiga Leitholde https://lauminja.wordpress.com/2015/04/26/apskats-laime-pilniga-albums-lp/

Synergy and Waterlilies (2018)

Synergy and Waterlillies is the third album the band has released together with Alexander Volk and it contains only 6 songs. Unlike the previous albums, the songs in this one were mostly created right there in the studio in the moment. Album is mixed and mastered at Wolk Recording Studios. Artwork by Liāna Mihailova.

Reviews:

- Sandris Vanzovičs (NRA) https://nra.lv/izklaide/245734-recenzija-laime-pilniga-synergy-and-waterlilies.htm

== Singles ==
- "Hey Babe" 2007
- "We are prayin'" 2008
- "I'm in Love with the Money" 2008
- "Sirdsapziņa" 2009
- "Miera vējos" 2010
- "Terror Woman" 2011
- "Shaman" 2011
- "On the Road" 2013
- "Black suited Funeral People" 2015
- "Kopā brīvi" 2016
- "Apocalyptic Intimacy " 2016
- "Hold On" 2017
- "Why" 2017
- "Summer's Ending" 2018
- "AWE" 2019
- "Pacēlums" 2019
- "Esmu, Tu esi Es" 2020
- "Divatā" 2021
- "Stop" 2021
- "Perseverance" 2021
- "Augstāk par zemi" 2022
- "Lights on" 2023
