= Juventus (choir) =

Latvian choir

University of Latvia Mixed Choir Juventus
- Choir
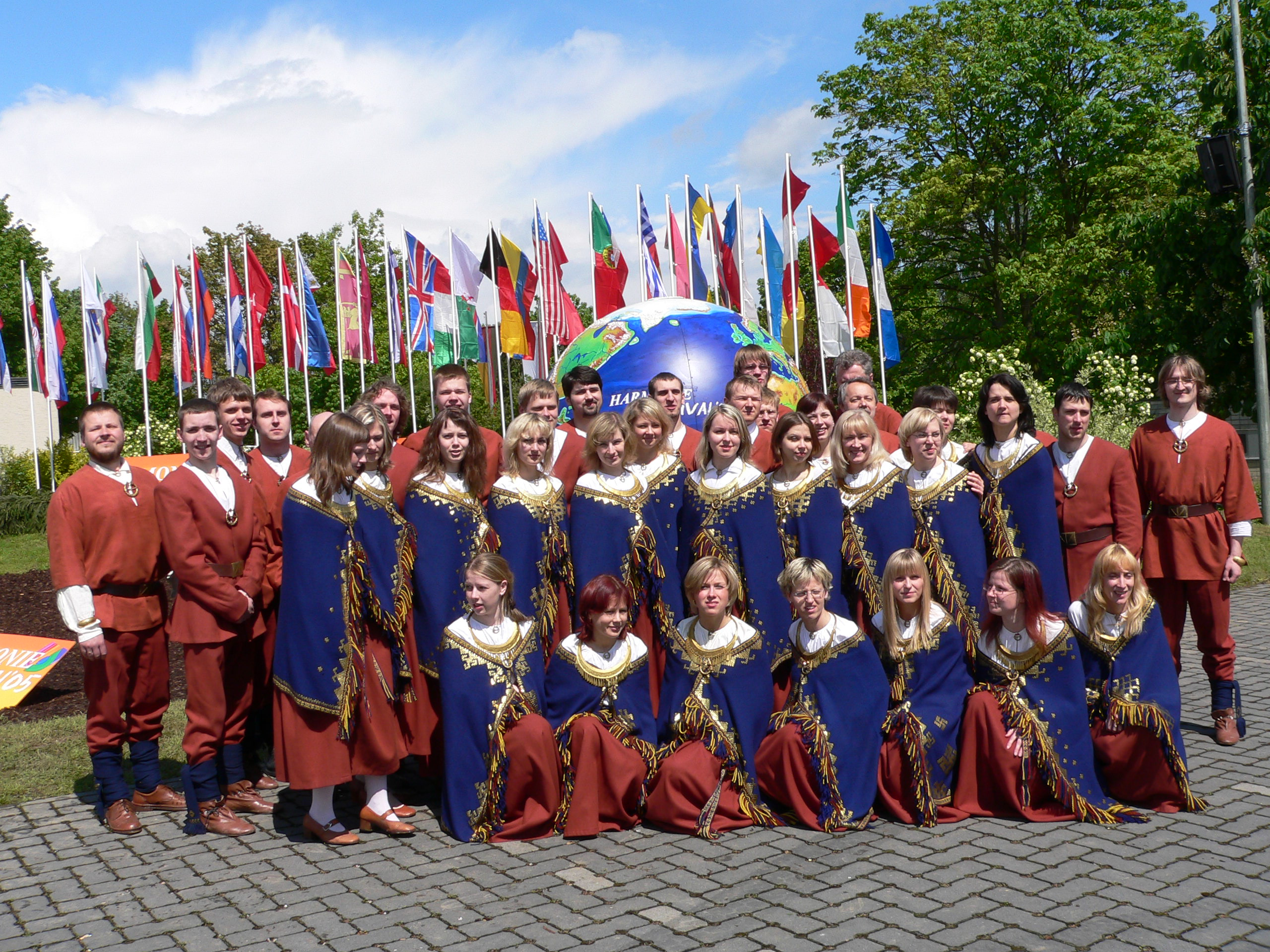
- Juventus in 2005 in Lindenholzhausen, Germany
- Origin: Riga, Latvia
- Founded: October 18, 1920 (age 106)
- Founder: University of Latvia
- Members: approximately 45
- Music director: Valdis Tomsons
- Choirmaster: Ieva Zvejniece
- Chief conductor: Valdis Tomsons
- Headquarters: Raiņa bulvāris 19, Riga, Latvia
- Affiliation: University of Latvia
- Website: juventus.lv

Juventus is a mixed choir based at the University of Latvia. Founded in 1920, it is the oldest university choir in Latvia. Over the years, the choir has been led by some of Latvia’s most distinguished choral conductors, including Haralds Mednis and Daumants Gailis. Since 2014, its artistic director has been Valdis Tomsons.

== History ==
The mixed choir Juventus was founded in 1920 by conductor Artūrs Bobkovics under the name University of Latvia Student Choir. It was the first Latvian choir to promote Latvian choral traditions abroad, performing concerts in Estonia and Lithuania. During World War II, the choir continued its activities but, owing to a shortage of male singers, was forced to prepare a repertoire for a women’s choir.

In 1950, Bobkovics retired and was succeeded by Haralds Mednis, a conductor at the Latvian SSR State Opera and Ballet Theatre. Mednis led the choir for seven years before his choice of repertoire came under harsh criticism from the ruling Communist Party. In 1957, he was replaced by Daumants Gailis.

Under Gailis’s leadership, Juventus achieved some of the greatest successes in its history, winning first prize in the choir competition at the Latvian Song and Dance Festival four times, in 1970, 1973, 1977, and 1985. In 1988 the choir took part in the events of the Singing Revolution by raising the flag of Latvia in Gaudeamus Festival in Vilnius.

Following the restoration of Latvia’s independence in 1990, Juventus became an active participant in international choral competitions and festivals. Its achievements include Grand Prix awards at the Stasys Šimkus International Choir Competition in Klaipėda, Lithuania (2011), the Montreux Choral Festival in Montreux, Switzerland (2017), the International Choral Festival Mundus Cantat in Sopot, Poland (2018), and the Tampere Vocal Music Festival in Tampere, Finland (2025).

Juventus also regularly collaborates with musicians outside the traditional choral sphere. In 2015, the choir performed at the Positivus Festival alongside DAGAMBA and Sinfonietta Rīga. It has also collaborated with Latvian singer Dons.

== Artistic directors and chief conductors ==
- 1920–1950: Artūrs Bobkovics
- 1950–1957: Haralds Mednis
- 1957–1988: Daumants Gailis
- 1988–2009: Juris Kļaviņš
- 2009–2012: Jānis Petrovskis
- 2012–2014: Mārcis Imants
- Since 2014: Valdis Tomsons
