= Estonia in the Eurovision Song Contest 2018 =

- Eurovision Song Contest 2018
- Participating broadcaster: Eesti Rahvusringhääling (ERR)
- Country: Estonia
- Selection process: Eesti Laul 2018
- Selection date: 3 March 2018

Competing entry
- Song: "La forza"
- Artist: Elina Nechayeva
- Songwriters: Mihkel Mattisen; Timo Vendt; Ksenia Kuchukova; Elina Nechayeva

Placement
- Semi-final result: Qualified (5th, 201 points)
- Final result: 8th, 245 points

Participation chronology

Estonia was represented at the Eurovision Song Contest 2018 with the song "La forza" written by Mihkel Mattisen, Timo Vendt, Ksenia Kuchukova and Elina Nechayeva. The song was performed by Elina Nechayeva. The Estonian broadcaster Eesti Rahvusringhääling (ERR) organised the national final Eesti Laul 2018 in order to select the Estonian entry for the 2018 contest in Lisbon, Portugal. The national final consisted of three shows: two semi-finals and a final. Ten songs competed in each semi-final and five from each semi-final as determined by a jury panel and public vote qualified to the final. In the final, the winner was selected over two rounds of voting. In the first round, a jury panel and a public vote selected the top three to qualify to the superfinal. In the superfinal, "La forza" performed by Elina Nechayeva was selected as the winner entirely by a public vote.

Estonia was drawn to compete in the first semi-final of the Eurovision Song Contest which took place on 8 May 2018. Performing during the show in position 9, "La forza" was announced among the top 10 entries of the first semi-final and therefore qualified to compete in the final on 12 May. It was later revealed that Estonia placed fifth out of the 19 participating countries in the semi-final with 201 points. In the final, Estonia performed in position 6 and placed eighth out of the 26 participating countries, scoring 245 points.

== Background ==
Prior to the 2018 contest, Estonia had participated in the Eurovision Song Contest twenty-three times since its first entry in 1994, winning the contest on one occasion in 2001 with the song "Everybody" performed by Tanel Padar, Dave Benton and 2XL. Following the introduction of semi-finals for the 2004, Estonia has, to this point, managed to qualify to the final on five occasions. In 2017, "Verona" performed by Koit Toome and Laura failed to qualify Estonia to the final where the song placed fourteenth in the semi-final.

The Estonian national broadcaster, Eesti Rahvusringhääling (ERR), broadcasts the event within Estonia and organises the selection process for the nation's entry. ERR confirmed Estonia's participation at the 2018 Eurovision Song Contest on 2 May 2017. Since their debut, the Estonian broadcaster has organised national finals that feature a competition among multiple artists and songs in order to select Estonia's entry for the Eurovision Song Contest. The Eesti Laul competition has been organised since 2009 in order to select Estonia's entry and on 19 September 2017, ERR announced the organisation of Eesti Laul 2018 in order to select the nation's 2018 entry.

== Before Eurovision ==
=== Eesti Laul 2018 ===
Eesti Laul 2018 was the tenth edition of the Estonian national selection Eesti Laul, which selected Estonia's entry for the Eurovision Song Contest 2018. The competition consisted of twenty entries competing in two semi-finals on 10 and 17 February 2018 leading to a ten-song final on 3 March 2018. All three shows were broadcast on Eesti Televisioon (ETV) and on ETV+ with Russian commentary as well as streamed online at the broadcaster's official website err.ee. The final was also broadcast via radio on Raadio 2 with commentary by Erik Morna, Margus Kamlat, Bert Järvet, Kristo Rajasaare and Mihkel Ulk.

==== Format ====
The format of the competition included two semi-finals on 10 and 17 February 2018 and a final on 3 March 2018. Ten songs competed in each semi-final and the top five from each semi-final qualified to complete the ten song lineup in the final. The results of the semi-finals was determined by the 50/50 combination of votes from a professional jury and public televoting for the first four qualifiers and a second round of public televoting for the fifth qualifier. The winning song in the final was selected over two rounds of voting: the first round results selected the top three songs via the 50/50 combination of jury and public voting, while the second round (superfinal) determined the winner solely by public televoting. In addition to winning the right to represent Estonia at the 2018 Eurovision Song Contest, the winning songwriters and producers were also awarded monetary prizes of €3,000 and €1,000, respectively. The Estonian Authors' Society and Estonian Performers Association also awarded a monetary prize of €1,000 to the top three entries.

==== Competing entries ====
On 19 September 2017, ERR opened the submission period for artists and composers to submit their entries up until 1 November 2017. All artists and composers were required to have Estonian citizenship or be a permanent resident of Estonia and each artist and songwriter was only able to submit a maximum of three entries, with an exception for composers who participated in songwriting camps organised by the Estonian Song Academy in spring and autumn 2017. Foreign collaborations were allowed as long as 50% of the songwriters were Estonian. A record 258 submissions were received by the deadline—breaking the previous record of 242, set during the 2017 edition. A 15-member jury panel selected 15 semi-finalists from the submissions with the remaining 5 semi-finalists selected by members of the Eesti Laul editorial board. The selected songs were announced during the ETV entertainment program Ringvaade on 10 November 2017. The selection jury consisted of Karl-Erik Taukar (singer), Koit Raudsepp (Raadio 2 presenter), Alon Amir (music manager), Mariliis Mõttus (Müürileht music editor), Andres Puusepp (DJ), Jaane Tomps (Delfi music journalist), Harri Hakanen (Uuden Musiikin Kilpailu music manager), Mingo Rajandi (musician), Siim Nestor (music critic), Getter Jaani (singer), Sten Teppan (Vikerraadio music editor), Mari-Liis Männik (Radio Elmar), Toomas Puna (Raadio Sky+ program director), Irina Svensson (Raadio 4 editor) and Valner Valme (music critic), while the Eesti Laul editorial board members consisted of Ove Musting (director), Ingrid Kohtla (editor), Mai Palling (editor), Filip Adamo (consultant), Ruth Heinmaa (producer) and Mart Normet (producer).

Among the competing artists were previous Eurovision Song Contest entrants Gerli Padar, who represented Estonia in 2007, and Stig Rästa, who represented Estonia in 2015 together with Elina Born. Iiris, Indrek Ventmann, Karl Kristjan, Rolf Roosalu and Semy have all competed in previous editions of Eesti Laul. Marju Länik's entry was written by Axel Ehnström, who represented Finland in 2011 as Paradise Oskar.

Artist	Song	Songwriter(s)
Aden Ray	"Everybody's Dressed"	Nikita Bogdanov
Desiree	"On My Mind"	Amiran Gorgazjan
Eliis Pärna and Gerli Padar	"Sky"	Imre Sooäär
Eliis Pärna and Gerli Padar	"Taevas"	Imre Sooäär
Elina Nechayeva	"La forza"	Mihkel Mattisen, Timo Vendt, Ksenia Kuchukova, Elina Nechayeva
Etnopatsy	"Külm"	Aile Alveus-Krautmann
Evestus	"Welcome to My World"	Ott Evestus
Frankie Animal	"(Can't Keep Calling) Misty"	Marie Vaigla, Jonas Kaarnamets, Jan-Christopher Soovik
Girls in Pearls	"Spellbound"	Vivi Maar, Viveli Maar, Rasmus Lill
Iiris and Agoh	"Drop That Boogie"	Ago Teppand, Iiris Vesik
Indrek Ventmann	"Tempel"	Allan Kasuk, Siim Koppel, Indrek Ventmann
Karl-Kristjan and Karl Killing feat. Wateva	"Young"	Karl-Kristjan Kingi, Karl Killing, Kris Evan Säde, Hugo Martin Maasikas
Marju Länik	"Täna otsuseid ei tee"	Liina Saar, Herman Gardarfve, Axel Ehnström, Marju Länik
Metsakutsu	"Koplifornia"	Meelis Meri, Rainer Olbri
Miljardid	"Pseudoprobleem"	Miljardid, Marten Kuningas
Nika	"Knock Knock"	Nika Prokopjeva
Rolf Roosalu	"Show a Little Love"	Rolf Roosalu, Priit Uustulnd, Maian Kärmas
Sibyl Vane	"Thousand Words"	Sibyl Vane, Helena Randlaht
Stig Rästa	"Home"	Stig Rästa, Fred Krieger
Tiiu x Okym x Semy	"Näita oma energiat"	Kaido Luht, Sergei Morgun, Tiiu Kaarlõp, Meiko Umal
Vajé	"Laura (Walk with Me)"	Karl-Ander Reismann

==== Semi-finals ====
The two semi-finals took place on 10 and 17 February 2018, hosted by Kristel Aaslaid and Martin Veisman. The live portion of the shows were held at the ERR studios in Tallinn where the artists awaited the results while their performances, which were filmed earlier at the ERR studios between 2 and 4 February 2018, were screened. In each semi-final ten songs competed for the first four spots in the final with the outcome decided upon by the combination of the votes from a jury panel and a public televote which registered 22,985 votes in the first semi-final and 9,782 votes in the second semi-final; the fifth qualifier was decided by an additional televote between the remaining non-qualifiers which registered 10,909 votes in the first semi-final and 7,920 votes in the second semi-final. The jury panel that voted in the semi-finals consisted of Lenna Kuurmaa, Eeva Talsi, Hanna Parman, Mariliis Mõttus, Kristjan Hirmo, Tomi Rahula, Jaanus Nõgisto, Dave Benton, Rainer Ild, Aleksandr Žemžurov and Erik Morna.

First round (jury and televote) qualifier Second round (televote-only) qualifier

Semi-final 1 (First round) – 10 February 2018
R/O	Artist	Song	Jury		Televote		Total	Place
R/O	Artist	Song	Votes	Points	Votes	Points	Total	Place
1	Vajé	"Laura (Walk with Me)"	22	3	1,620	8	11	5
2	Iiris and Agoh	"Drop That Boogie"	97	10	872	4	14	4
3	Etnopatsy	"Külm"	34	4	1,268	6	10	6
4	Sibyl Vane	"Thousand Words"	78	7	1,449	7	14	3
5	Aden Ray	"Everybody's Dressed"	59	5	978	5	10	7
6	Tiiu x Okym x Semy	"Näita oma energiat"	10	1	556	1	2	10
7	Stig Rästa	"Home"	86	8	2,999	10	18	2
8	Miljardid	"Pseudoprobleem"	61	6	686	2	8	8
9	Desiree	"On My Mind"	12	2	765	3	5	9
10	Elina Nechayeva	"La forza"	113	12	11,792	12	24	1

Semi-final 1 (Second round) – 10 February 2018
Artist	Song	Televote	Place
Aden Ray	"Everybody's Dressed"	2,454	2
Desiree	"On My Mind"	1,461	4
Etnopatsy	"Külm"	1,861	3
Miljardid	"Pseudoprobleem"	1,447	5
Tiiu x Okym x Semy	"Näita oma energiat"	432	6
Vajé	"Laura (Walk with Me)"	3,254	1

Semi-final 2 (First round) – 17 February 2018
R/O	Artist	Song	Jury		Televote		Total	Place
R/O	Artist	Song	Votes	Points	Votes	Points	Total	Place
1	Marju Länik	"Täna otsuseid ei tee"	39	4	566	1	5	10
2	Rolf Roosalu	"Show a Little Love"	57	6	862	4	10	7
3	Frankie Animal	"(Can't Keep Calling) Misty"	112	12	972	7	19	1
4	Eliis Pärna and Gerli Padar	"Sky"	22	1	1,303	10	11	6
5	Indrek Ventmann	"Tempel"	38	3	957	6	9	8
6	Evestus	"Welcome to My World"	75	8	873	5	13	4
7	Karl-Kristjan and Karl Killing feat. Wateva	"Young"	50	5	1,791	12	17	2
8	Metsakutsu	"Koplifornia"	30	2	734	3	5	9
9	Girls in Pearls	"Spellbound"	91	10	705	2	12	5
10	Nika	"Knock Knock"	58	7	1,019	8	15	3

Semi-final 2 (Second round) – 17 February 2018
Artist	Song	Televote	Place
Eliis Pärna and Gerli Padar	"Sky"	1,764	1
Girls in Pearls	"Spellbound"	1,234	5
Indrek Ventmann	"Tempel"	1,333	4
Marju Länik	"Täna otsuseid ei tee"	635	6
Metsakutsu	"Koplifornia"	1,454	3
Rolf Roosalu	"Show a Little Love"	1,500	2

==== Final ====
The final took place on 3 March 2018 at the Saku Suurhall in Tallinn, hosted by Kristel Aaslaid and Martin Veisman. The five entries that qualified from each of the two preceding semi-finals, all together ten songs, competed during the show. The winner was selected over two rounds of voting. In the first round, a jury (50%) and public televote (50%) determined the top three entries to proceed to the superfinal. The public vote in the first round registered 70,755 votes. In the superfinal, "La forza" performed by Elina Nechayeva was selected as the winner entirely by a public televote. The public televote in the superfinal registered 61,637 votes. In addition to the performances of the competing entries, Koit Toome and Laura, who represented Estonia in the Eurovision Song Contest 2017, Leslie Da Bass with Evelin Võigemast, and Rasmus Rändvee with X Faktors winner Arturs Gruzdinš performed as the interval acts. The jury panel that voted in the first round of the final consisted of Valter Soosalu (conductor), Maiken (singer), Ģirts Majors (Positivus Festival organizer), Nicola Caligiore (Italian Eurovision Head of Delegation), Laura Prits (singer), Sten Teppan (Vikerraadio music editor), Joana Levieva-Sawyer (Bulgarian Eurovision Head of Delegation), Helen Sildna (Tallinn Music Week organizer), Ole Tøpholm (radio presenter), Marina Kesler (choreographer) and Ivar Must (composer).

Final – 3 March 2018
R/O	Artist	Song	Jury		Televote		Total	Place
R/O	Artist	Song	Votes	Points	Votes	Points	Total	Place
1	Karl-Kristjan and Karl Killing feat. Wateva	"Young"	47	3	5,786	8	11	6
2	Eliis Pärna and Gerli Padar	"Taevas"	34	1	2,308	3	4	10
3	Nika	"Knock Knock"	50	4	1,991	1	5	9
4	Sibyl Vane	"Thousand Words"	86	10	2,898	4	14	4
5	Stig Rästa	"Home"	79	7	5,714	7	14	3
6	Vajé	"Laura (Walk with Me)"	51	5	5,995	10	15	2
7	Elina Nechayeva	"La forza"	113	12	37,628	12	24	1
8	Frankie Animal	"(Can't Keep Calling) Misty"	85	8	2,031	2	10	7
9	Iiris and Agoh	"Drop That Boogie"	52	6	3,427	6	12	5
10	Evestus	"Welcome to My World"	41	2	2,977	5	7	8

Detailed Jury Votes
R/O	Song	V. Soosalu	G. Majors	Maiken	N. Caligiore	L. Prits	S. Teppan	J. Levieva-Sawyer	H. Sildna	O. Tøpholm	M. Kesler	I. Must	Total
1	"Young"	1	2	1	5	6	1	5	1	5	10	10	47
2	"Taevas"	2	1	2	2	2	8	4	2	4	4	3	34
3	"Knock Knock"	4	4	7	1	4	4	2	7	8	7	2	50
4	"Thousand Words"	6	6	6	10	10	7	7	8	6	8	12	86
5	"Home"	3	5	8	8	5	12	6	4	10	12	6	79
6	"Laura (Walk with Me)"	5	8	5	6	1	3	10	3	7	2	1	51
7	"La forza"	12	12	12	12	12	10	8	10	12	6	7	113
8	"(Can't Keep Calling) Misty"	8	10	10	7	7	6	12	12	2	3	8	85
9	"Drop That Boogie"	7	7	4	4	3	5	3	6	3	5	5	52
10	"Welcome to My World"	10	3	3	3	8	2	1	5	1	1	4	41

Superfinal – 3 March 2018
R/O	Artist	Song	Televote	Place
1	Stig Rästa	"Home"	9,686	2
2	Vajé	"Laura (Walk with Me)"	8,506	3
3	Elina Nechayeva	"La forza"	43,445	1

== At Eurovision ==
According to Eurovision rules, all nations with the exceptions of the host country and the "Big Five" (France, Germany, Italy, Spain and the United Kingdom) are required to qualify from one of two semi-finals in order to compete for the final; the top ten countries from each semi-final progress to the final. The European Broadcasting Union (EBU) split up the competing countries into six different pots based on voting patterns from previous contests, with countries with favourable voting histories put into the same pot. On 29 January 2018, an allocation draw was held which placed each country into one of the two semi-finals, as well as which half of the show they would perform in. Estonia was placed into the first semi-final, to be held on 8 May 2018, and was scheduled to perform in the first half of the show.

Once all the competing songs for the 2018 contest had been released, the running order for the semi-finals was decided by the shows' producers rather than through another draw, so that similar songs were not placed next to each other. Estonia was set to perform in position 9, following the entry from Belarus and before the entry from Bulgaria.

The two semi-finals and the final were broadcast in Estonia on ETV with commentary in Estonian by Marko Reikop and on ETV+ with commentary in Russian by Aleksandr Hobotov and Julia Kalenda. The first semi-final and final were also broadcast via radio on Raadio 2 with Estonian commentary by Mart Juur and Andrus Kivirähk. The Estonian spokesperson, who announced the top 12-point score awarded by the Estonian jury during the final, was Ott Evestus.

=== Semi-final ===
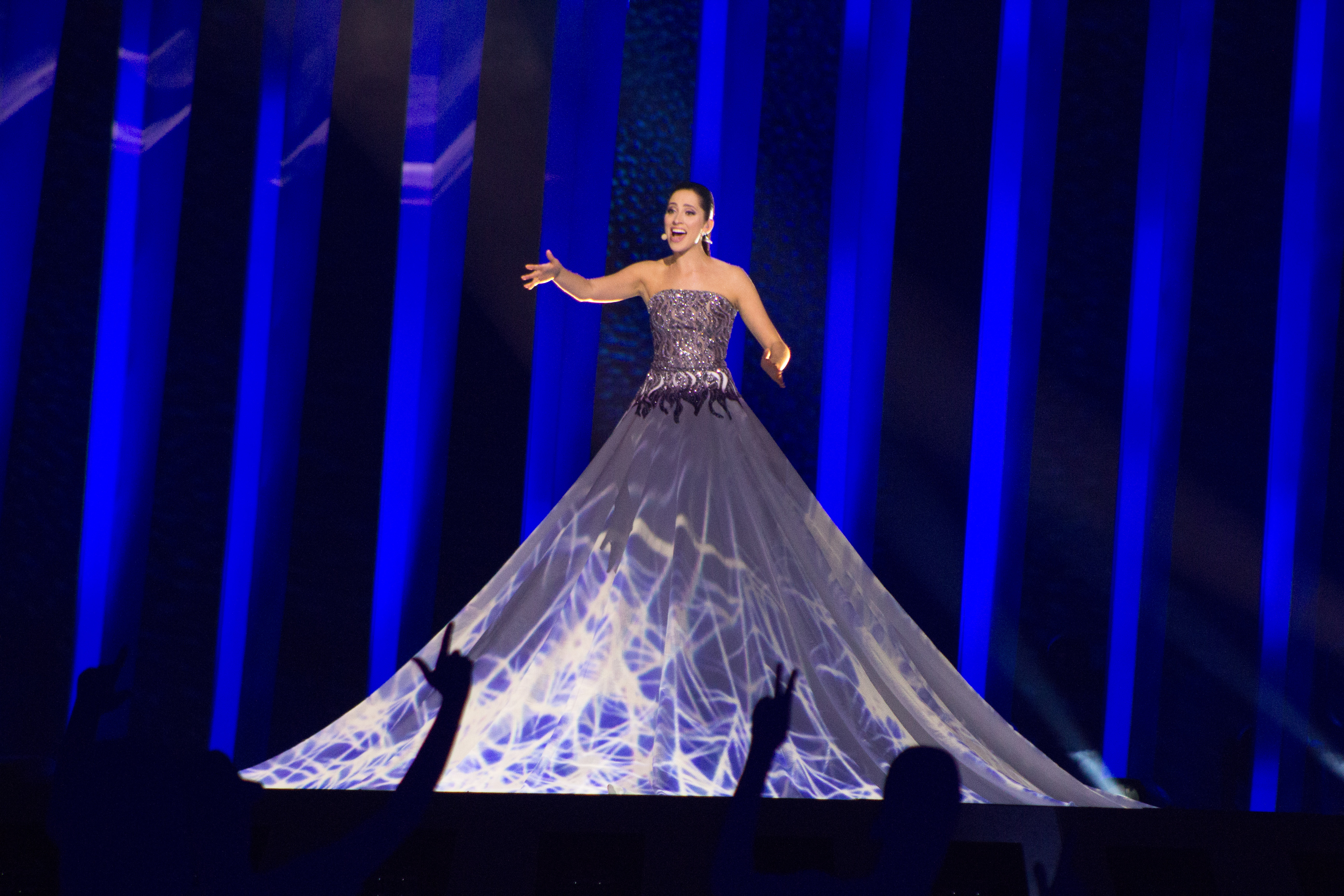
Elina Nechayeva during a rehearsal before the first semi-final

Elina Nechayeva took part in technical rehearsals on 29 April and 3 May, followed by dress rehearsals on 7 and 8 May. This included the jury show on 9 May where the professional juries of each country watched and voted on the competing entries.

The Estonian performance featured Elina Nechayeva performing on stage in a dress which measured 52 m^{2} and weighted around 8 kg, on which numerous moving patterns reminiscent to flowers, galaxies and paint are continuously projected. In regards to the projections, video artist Alyona Movko stated: "There is a girl. She is an icy queen where love will melt her heart. The snow will become water. And after there is glowing, like a fairytale. And with Elina's hands there is growing of flowers – and after that she sends out these flowers, sending her love. And she is filled with love. It's the same story with colours in the song. They go from pastel colours to full red flowers. It's about love." A team of at least eight people moved Nechayeva's dress onto the exact position of the stage, as required by the projectors, with the entire preparation for the performance (finding a dress, creation and generation of the animations, mapping the projections onto the dress, synching with television when captured by a camera and finalising the choreography) taking two weeks. Although there were initially some logistical troubles regarding the projection effect, they were ultimately resolved by the time the Estonian delegation arrived in Lisbon. Elina Nechayeva was joined by two backing vocalists: the co-composers of "La forza" Mihkel Mattisen and Timo Vendt.

At the end of the show, Estonia was announced as having finished in the top 10 and subsequently qualifying for the grand final. It was later revealed that Estonia placed 5th in the semi-final, receiving a total of 201 points: 120 points from the televoting and 81 points from the juries.

=== Final ===
Shortly after the first semi-final, a winners' press conference was held for the ten qualifying countries. As part of this press conference, the qualifying artists took part in a draw to determine which half of the grand final they would subsequently participate in. This draw was done in the order the countries were announced during the semi-final. Estonia was drawn to compete in the first half. Following this draw, the shows' producers decided upon the running order of the final, as they had done for the semi-finals. Estonia was subsequently placed to perform in position 6, following the entry from Austria and before the entry from Norway.

Elina Nechayeva once again took part in dress rehearsals on 11 and 12 May before the final, including the jury final where the professional juries cast their final votes before the live show. Elina Nechayeva performed a repeat of her semi-final performance during the final on 12 May. Estonia placed 6th in the final, scoring 245 points: 102 points from the televoting and 143 points from the juries.

=== Voting ===
Voting during the three shows involved each country awarding two sets of points from 1-8, 10 and 12: one from their professional jury and the other from televoting. Each nation's jury consisted of five music industry professionals who are citizens of the country they represent, with their names published before the contest to ensure transparency. This jury judged each entry based on: vocal capacity; the stage performance; the song's composition and originality; and the overall impression by the act. In addition, no member of a national jury was permitted to be related in any way to any of the competing acts in such a way that they cannot vote impartially and independently. The individual rankings of each jury member as well as the nation's televoting results were released shortly after the grand final.

Below is a breakdown of points awarded to Estonia and awarded by Estonia in the first semi-final and grand final of the contest, and the breakdown of the jury voting and televoting conducted during the two shows:

==== Points awarded to Estonia ====
Points awarded to Estonia (Semi-final 1)
Score	Televote	Jury
12 points	Finland; Lithuania; Portugal	Switzerland
10 points	Ireland	Greece
8 points	Greece	Armenia; Ireland; Portugal
7 points	Israel	
6 points	Albania; Croatia; Cyprus; Iceland	Iceland; Spain; United Kingdom
5 points	Armenia; Belgium; Czech Republic	Cyprus
4 points	Bulgaria; United Kingdom	Lithuania; Macedonia
3 points	Austria; Azerbaijan; Belarus	Austria
2 points	Spain	
1 point	Switzerland	Azerbaijan

Points awarded to Estonia (Final)
Score	Televote	Jury
12 points	Finland; Lithuania	Macedonia; Moldova; Portugal
10 points	Latvia	Georgia; Switzerland
8 points	Israel	Australia; Latvia
7 points	France; Portugal	Denmark; Iceland
6 points	Georgia; Italy	Russia; United Kingdom
5 points	Czech Republic	Montenegro; San Marino; Slovenia
4 points	Albania; Cyprus; Greece; Ireland	Italy; Netherlands
3 points	Russia; Ukraine	Azerbaijan; Greece; Ireland; Romania; Serbia
2 points	Armenia; Bulgaria; Spain	Austria; Germany
1 point	Moldova	Cyprus; Spain; Ukraine

==== Points awarded by Estonia ====
Points awarded by Estonia (Semi-final 1)
Score	Televote	Jury
12 points	Finland	Austria
10 points	Lithuania	Lithuania
8 points	Austria	Cyprus
7 points	Czech Republic	Bulgaria
6 points	Belarus	Ireland
5 points	Ireland	Finland
4 points	Cyprus	Belgium
3 points	Belgium	Azerbaijan
2 points	Switzerland	Croatia
1 point	Israel	Albania

Points awarded by Estonia (Final)
Score	Televote	Jury
12 points	Lithuania	Austria
10 points	Finland	Lithuania
8 points	Denmark	Cyprus
7 points	Italy	Bulgaria
6 points	Austria	Germany
5 points	Czech Republic	Sweden
4 points	Cyprus	Norway
3 points	Hungary	Portugal
2 points	Norway	Finland
1 point	Moldova	Netherlands

==== Detailed voting results ====
The following members comprised the Estonian jury:

- Eva Palm (jury chairperson) – head promoter of Live Nation Baltics
- Allan Roosileht – radio host and DJ
- Anett Kulbin – artist
- Karl Killing – artist
- Rainer Ild – artist

Detailed voting results from Estonia (Semi-final 1)
R/O	Country	Jury							Televote	
R/O	Country	E. Palm	A. Roosileht	A. Kulbin	K. Killing	R. Ild	Rank	Points	Rank	Points
01	Azerbaijan	3	8	14	8	14	8	3	11	
02	Iceland	12	5	9	9	17	11		16	
03	Albania	10	10	13	5	8	10	1	13	
04	Belgium	7	11	3	15	10	7	4	8	3
05	Czech Republic	18	6	6	18	16	14		4	7
06	Lithuania	13	3	1	2	2	2	10	2	10
07	Israel	17	14	2	17	18	12		10	1
08	Belarus	8	12	18	16	15	17		5	6
09	Estonia									
10	Bulgaria	4	15	12	6	3	4	7	17	
11	Macedonia	16	16	15	14	13	18		18	
12	Croatia	9	13	7	10	5	9	2	15	
13	Austria	2	1	8	1	1	1	12	3	8
14	Greece	6	7	16	12	12	13		14	
15	Finland	5	2	10	13	11	6	5	1	12
16	Armenia	14	18	17	7	7	15		12	
17	Switzerland	15	17	11	11	6	16		9	2
18	Ireland	11	9	5	3	9	5	6	6	5
19	Cyprus	1	4	4	4	4	3	8	7	4

Detailed voting results from Estonia (Final)
R/O	Country	Jury							Televote	
R/O	Country	E. Palm	A. Roosileht	A. Kulbin	K. Killing	R. Ild	Rank	Points	Rank	Points
01	Ukraine	19	17	11	14	18	19		19	
02	Spain	20	20	6	9	9	13		18	
03	Slovenia	22	25	17	13	19	23		24	
04	Lithuania	11	4	1	2	1	2	10	1	12
05	Austria	3	1	3	1	2	1	12	5	6
06	Estonia									
07	Norway	6	6	14	8	12	7	4	9	2
08	Portugal	5	19	12	10	7	8	3	22	
09	United Kingdom	12	9	5	19	17	12		21	
10	Serbia	25	24	23	20	21	25		25	
11	Germany	17	7	2	4	3	5	6	15	
12	Albania	18	18	19	18	10	20		20	
13	France	8	10	15	17	16	14		12	
14	Czech Republic	23	11	8	25	24	15		6	5
15	Denmark	14	12	16	21	14	17		3	8
16	Australia	13	13	24	12	20	18		14	
17	Finland	7	5	18	11	15	9	2	2	10
18	Bulgaria	2	15	4	5	4	4	7	23	
19	Moldova	10	16	25	23	23	22		10	1
20	Sweden	4	3	20	7	11	6	5	17	
21	Hungary	21	23	22	22	13	24		8	3
22	Israel	24	22	7	24	25	16		16	
23	Netherlands	9	8	21	15	5	10	1	11	
24	Ireland	15	21	10	6	8	11		13	
25	Cyprus	1	2	9	3	6	3	8	7	4
26	Italy	16	14	13	16	22	21		4	7
