= Carnival Youth =

Latvian musical group

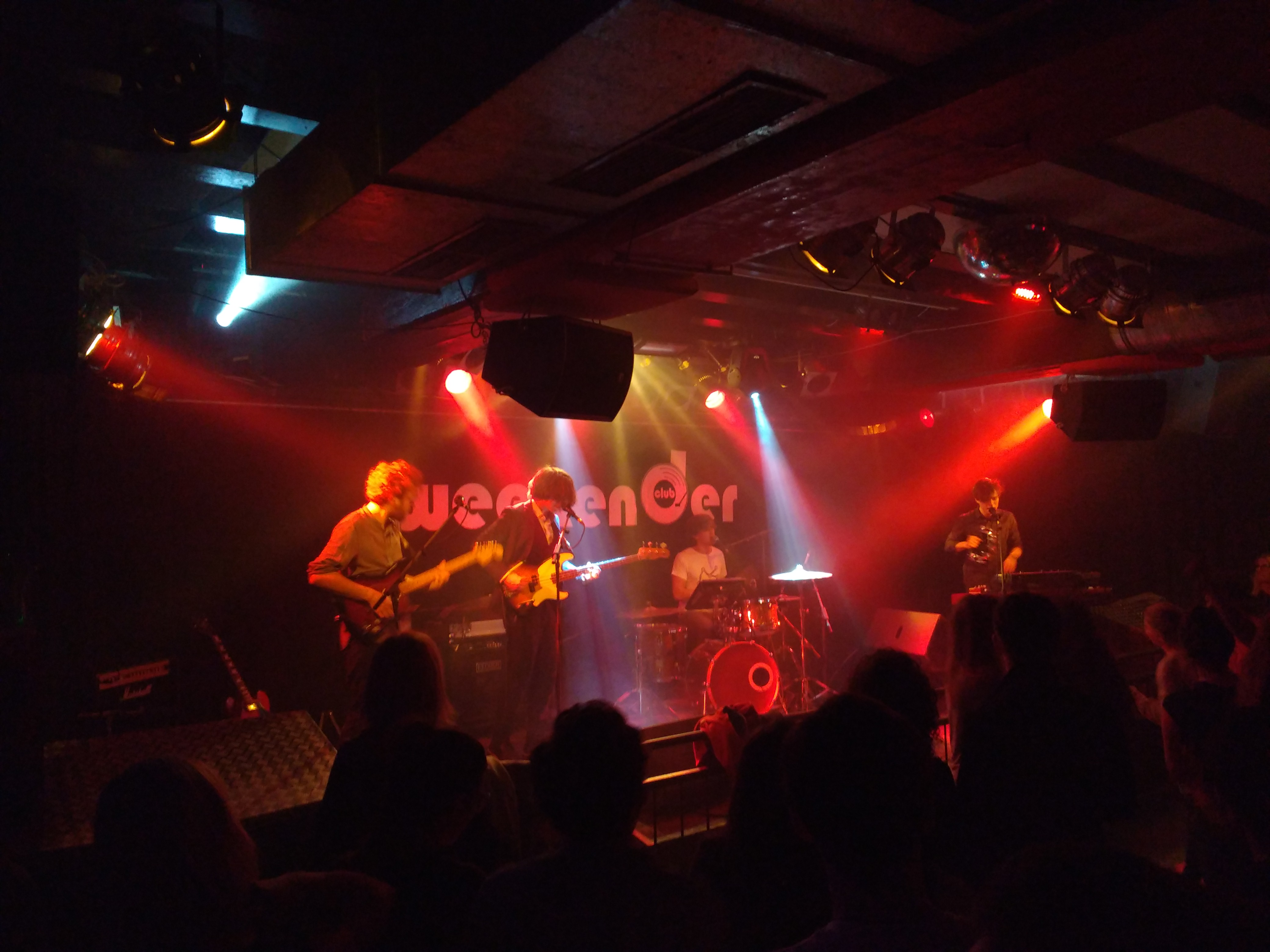
- Carnival Youth performing in Innsbruck in 2016

Background information
- Origin: Riga, Latvia
- Genres: Indie
- Years active: 2011–present
- Members: Roberts Vanags (keyboards, vocals); Edgars Kaupers (guitar, vocals); Emīls Kaupers (drums, vocals); Kristiāns Kosītis (bass)
- Website: carnivalyouth.lv

Carnival Youth is a Latvian indie band formed in Riga in 2011. The band consists of twins Edgars Kaupers (guitar, vocals) and Emīls Kaupers (drums, vocals), Roberts Vanags (keyboards, vocals) and Kristiāns Kosītis (bass).

On May 26, 2014, the group released their first EP, titled Never Have Enough, which was followed by their first studio album, No Clouds Allowed on October 20 the same year, which won the Latvian Golden Microphone award for best debut.

In January 2016, the band was awarded the European Border Breakers Award (EBBA) for their success abroad, where they, at the same occasion, also won the EBBA Public Choice Award. In the spring of 2016, their second studio album, Propeller, was released.

On June 1, 2017, their third album, Vienā vilcienā was released. To this date, it is their only album to be sung exclusively in their native language, Latvian. The choice to sing exclusively in Latvian, rather than in both Latvian and English as on previous albums, was allegedly due to Latvia celebrating its centenary of independence the year after, in 2018.

Two years later, the group followed up with their fourth studio album, Good Luck. In May 2020, the group appeared on the album Leto bez interneta (Note: Transcribed from Russian Cyrillic: лето без интернета, meaning "Summer Without Internet") by Russian rock band Mumiy Troll, performing a Latvian language version of the song Leto bez interneta, titled Vasara bez internetiem (English: Summer Without Internet).

In addition to their home country of Latvia, the group has performed in countries such as Canada, the United States Austria England, Hungary, Finland, France and Germany, as well as festivals such as SXSW, The Great Escape, Sziget, Positivus, Open'er, Reeperbahn, Eurosonic, Summer Sound.

== Discography ==
=== EP's ===
- Never Have Enough (2014)

=== Studio albums ===
- Propeller (2016)
- Good Luck (2019)
- Naivais ku-kū (2021)

=== Charted studio albums ===
List of charted studio albums, with selected details
Title	Details	Peak chart positions
Title	Details	LAT
No Clouds Allowed	Released: 20 October 2014; Label: Self-released; Formats: Physical, digital download, streaming	57
Vienā vilcienā	Released: 1 June 2017; Label: Self-released; Formats: Physical, digital download, streaming	66

=== Charted singles ===
List of charted singles, with year, album and chart positions
Title	Year	Peak chart positions				Album or EP
Title	Year	LAT Air. (Note: Both Latvian Music Producers Association and TopHit provides airplay charts for Latvia. Since 2023, LaIPA airplay chart has only 20 positions, for this reason the peaks below Top 20 are taken from TopHit Latvian airplay chart.)	LAT Dom. Air.	LAT Stream.	LAT Dom. Stream.	Album or EP
"Dzeguzes balss"	2020	*		12	9	Naivais ku-kū
"Brīvajā laikā"	2025	13	3	—	—	Non-album singles
"Labākā doma pasaulē" (featuring Evija Vēbere)	2025	8	1	—	—	Non-album singles
"Puķes" (with Fiņķis)	2025	11	2	—	—	Non-album singles
"Mīnas" (featuring Julianna)	2026	61	—	—	—	Non-album singles
"—" denotes items which were not released in that country or failed to chart. "*" denotes that the chart did not exist at that time.
