= Frankie Animal =

Estonian musical group

- Frankie Animal in 2026

Background information
- Origin: Tallinn, Estonia
- Genre: indie rock
- Years active: 2012–present
- Label: Made in Baltics
- Members: Marie Vaigla; Jonas Kaarnamets; Jan-Christopher Soovik
- Website: http://www.frankieanimal.com

Frankie Animal is an Estonian indie rock band formed in 2012.

In the year of their foundation, Frankie Animal participated in the Estonian Youth Band (Noortebänd) competition, where they managed to win eight awards. In 2014 they released a debut EP Obsession, which peaked in digital streaming platforms.

The band has performed at the Positivus Festival in Latvia, as well as in The Netherlands at Eurosonic Noorderslag. They were also the supporting act for Ewert and the Two Dragons during their 2015 tour in Germany.

In April 2016 Frankie Animal released their first full-length album The Backbeat.

Frankie Animal participated in Eesti Laul 2018 with their entry "(Can't Keep Calling) Misty".

== Musical career ==
=== 2012-2014: Early years ===
The band gave its first public concert in the autumn of 2012. On October 25, they entered the Youth Band competition, where they reached the finals but were the runner-up in the end. Frankie Animal still managed to win eight special awards, including Raadio 2's, leading alternative radio in Estonia, favourite and audience’s favourite. In December 2013 they started recording their first EP Obsession, which was completed in collaboration with Ewert and The Two Dragons guitarist Erki Pärnoja. "There's both a rockier side and a softer, more melancholy side. Everything is balanced, the first half has more power and the other half is more peaceful with gloomy melodies," explained Marie, the vocalist. In 2014 the band had their first big concert at the Positivus Festival in Latvia. They also performed at Intsikurmu, an Estonian music festival. Frankie Animal's first singles were "My Friend" and "Loveless man".

=== 2015: Eurosonic Noorderslag ===
2015 was a significant year for the band as they had the opportunity to perform at the Dutch festival Eurosonic Noorderslag, which is known as a place to discover new artists. In addition, they took part in Ewert and The Two Dragons tour in Germany, where they were the supporting act at five concerts. It was a big stepping stone for them, as the band had always said how Ewert and the Two Dragons really inspired them to start a band themselves.

=== 2016: The Backbeat ===
In April, Frankie Animal's first full-length album The Backbeat was released. Kaspar Viilup (Estonian Public Broadcasting) said: "Marie Vaigla's vocals are remarkably versatile, at one point as fragile as Karen O's solo projects and the next moment screaming-roaring as The Kills' lead vocalist Alison Mosshart. The guitar parts are also praiseworthy - Jonas Kaarnamets is one of the most talented Estonian guitarists of the new era. Their music really sounds unexpectedly big - even the ballads at the end of the album are bright and heart-wrenching rather than pretentious and cold. So there is definitely no lack of emotionality on this record - something that is a big exception in younger generation rock music, because the macho-posture and the "I'm-so-cool" image just obscure it. Frankie Animal has completely gotten rid of it."

=== 2017-2018: Eesti Laul ===
In 2017 the band released three singles: "Nightlights", "Pretty Late" and "(Can't Keep Calling) Misty". With the latter, they took part in the Eesti Laul 2018 contest, where the winner represents Estonia in the Eurovision Song Contest. Frankie Animal placed seventh in the competition, but gained public recognition in the process. In May they collaborated with Jüri Pootsmann and released a single "Funny".

=== 2019-Present ===
In June 2019, Frankie Animal released a new single "Playful" under the label "Made in Baltics" (Sony Music), which became the most played song by Raadio 2 in July 2019. On 1 May 2020 they released a single "Restless". "It seems to me that with "Playful" and "Restless" we have found the direction we want to move musically with the whole album. Slightly pop, nostalgic and a reflection of us three. I feel that the connection between us is also getting stronger and that makes the music more complete," says the band's guitarist Jonas Kaarnamets.

== Members ==
- Marie Vaigla (vocals, keyboard)
- Jonas Kaarnamets (guitar)
- Jan-Christopher Soovik (bass)

== Discography ==
=== Studio albums ===
- The Backbeat (2016)
- Party Alone (2022)
- Hearts (2026)

=== EPs ===
- Obsession (2014)

=== Singles ===
Title	Year	Peak chart positions		Album or EP
Title	Year	EST	EST Air.	Album or EP
"Obsession"	2014	*		Obsession
"My Friend"	2014	*		Non-album singles
"Loveless Man"	2014	*		Non-album singles
"The Backbeat"	2016	*	—	The Backbeat
"Kickdrum Kickdrum!"	2016	*	—	The Backbeat
"Nightlights"	2017	*	—	Non-album singles
"Pretty Late"	2017	*	—	Non-album singles
"(Can't Keep Calling) Misty"	2017	10	—	Non-album singles
"Funny" (featuring Jüri Pootsmann)	2018	—	—	Non-album singles
"Playful"	2019	—	—	Non-album singles
"Restless" (featuring Eygo)	2020	—	—	Non-album singles
"Peaches" (with Gram-Of-Fun)	2021	*	—	Non-album singles
"Pretty Late"	2021	*	—	Non-album singles
"You, I Need You"	2025	*	31	Hearts
"Maria Marianna"	2025	*	81	Hearts
"I Want It (If You Want To)"	2026	*	61	Hearts
"Lovin You"	2026	*	51	Hearts
"Hearts"	2026	*	81	Hearts
"—" denotes a recording that did not chart or was not released in that territory. "*" denotes that the chart did not exist at that time.
