= Instrumenti =

Electronic Indie Pop music band from Riga, Latvia

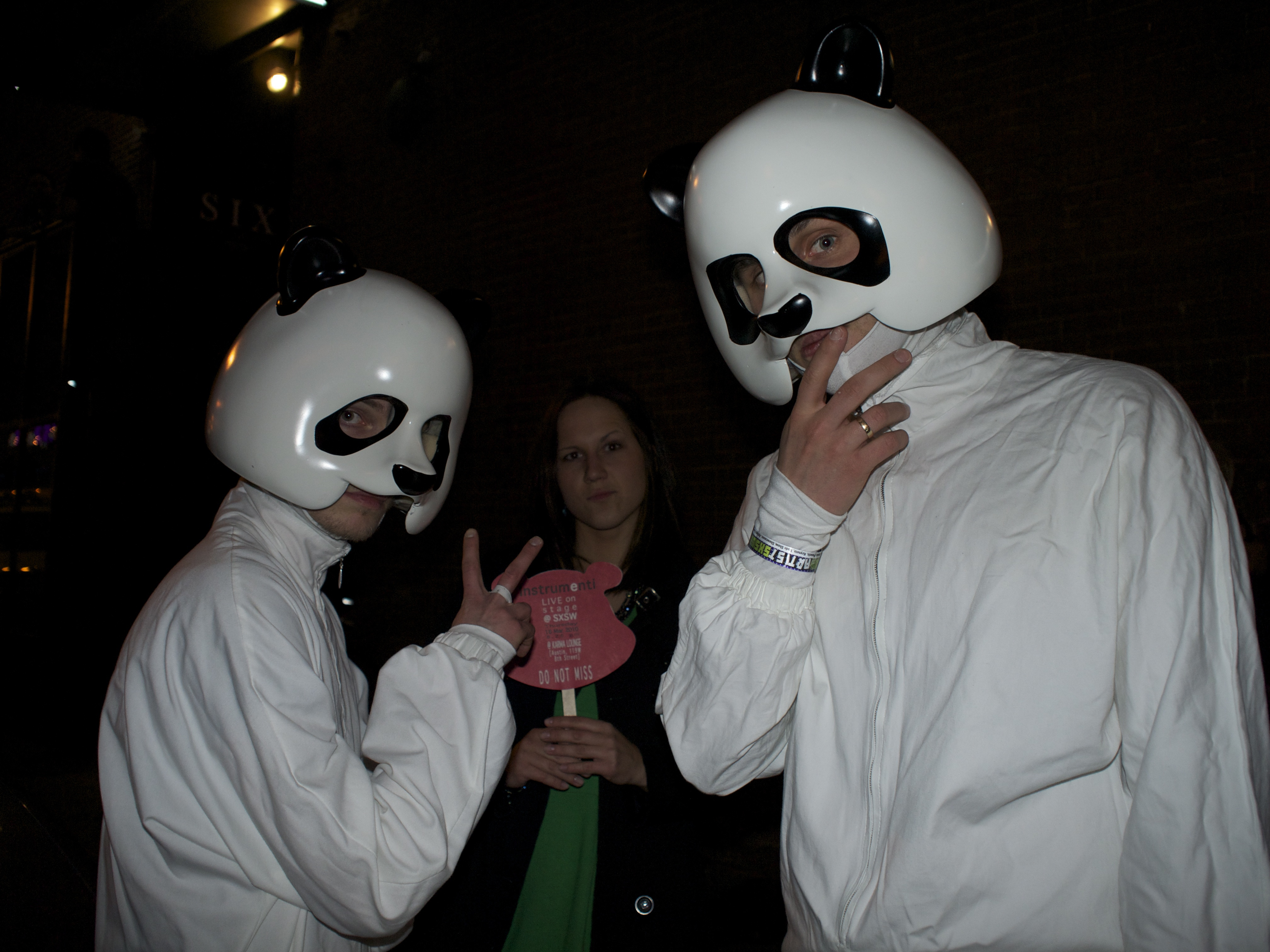

Background information
- Origin: Rīga, Latvia
- Genres: Indie pop
- Years active: 2007-present
- Labels: Tru Music Studio
- Members: Jānis Šipkēvics; Reinis Sējāns; Gatis Zaķis
- Website: instrumenti.in

Instrumenti are an Electronic Indie Pop music band from Latvia, Riga, originally formed by two academically educated musicians Jānis Šipkēvics (Shipsea) and Reinis Sējāns. In 2014, band's producer Gatis Zaķis became full member.

During the years various musicians and visual artists from Latvia, Sweden, Finland, France and Iceland at some point have called themselves Instrumenti members.

Instrumenti, a two-piece electro indie pop band, has proven to be amongst the best Baltic live acts of the decade.

The band published their first single "Life Jacket Under Your Seat" in summer 2008, which immediately caught attention of Latvian radio stations. However, the group was officially formed only in 2009. Shipsi (vocals/keyboards) has one of the most impressive falsettos today's music has to offer while Reynsi (drums/ keyboards/vocals) has a genuine talent of creating incredibly rich and warm sound backed up with beautiful harmonies. Instrumenti sound has been described as a mix of Muse, Sigur Rós and Michael Jackson.

In August 2011 Instrumenti released their debut album TRU recorded at the Greenhouse studios in Reykjavik, collaborating with producers and arrangers who've worked on most of Sigur Rós, Björk and Jónsi's records.

Being one of the most sought-after Baltic acts, Instrumenti have played the biggest venues in the Baltic states and have taken part in numerous festivals and showcases all over Europe (Germany, Austria, Sweden, Iceland, Norway, Poland, UK, France, Belgium, Czech Republic etc.) - SXSW, The Great Escape Festival, Eurosonic Noorderslag, Heineken Opener, Positivus Festival, Rock For People, Waves Vienna, Tallinn Music Week among others.

What makes Instrumenti captivating is the duo's natural wit, charisma, creativity and skills that allow them to delicately blend different styles and genres, creating an enjoyable aural and visual adventure.

In 2013, Instrumenti participated in a number of European festivals, playing alongside Friendly Fires, Keane, The Vaccines, Hurts and Skrillex among others.

== Awards ==
Instrumenti received two Music Awards at Annual Latvian Music Awards 2010 – Best Song for "Apēst Tevi" and Best Debut for "Pandemiya" EP.

== Live shows ==
Instrumenti have performed in Germany, Austria, Iceland, Norway, Poland, UK, France, Belgium, Czech Republic, Sweden, Lithuania, Estonia, Russia, USA, UK.

== Discography ==
=== Albums ===
List of charted studio albums, with selected details
Title	Details	Peak chart positions	Certification
Title	Details	LAT	Certification
Tru	Released: 31 August 2011; Label: Instrumenti; Formats: CD, Vinyl	*	LaIPA: Gold
Procrastination	Released: 21 May 2013; Label: Instrumenti; Formats: CD, Vinyl	*	
Iekams	Released: 2 December 2014; Label: Instrumenti; Formats: CD, Vinyl	*	
Atkala	Released: 8 December 2017; Label: Instrumenti; Formats: CD, Vinyl	1	
Cilvēks	Released: 15 March 2019; Label: Instrumenti; Formats: CD, Vinyl	—	
"—" denotes items which were not released in that country or failed to chart. "*" denotes that the chart did not exist at that time.

=== EPs ===
Title	Album details
Pandemiya*	Released: 2009; Label: Instrumenti; Formats: CD

- Containing singles "Life Jacket Under Your Seat", "Kvik Myndir", "(Back of Your) Drawer", "Peace (There Must Be)", and the official video for "Kvik Myndir".

=== DVDs ===
Title	Album details
Tru Live	Released: 2012, 5 September; Label: Instrumenti; Formats: DVD, Blu-ray Disc

=== Airplay singles ===
Year	Song	Album or EP
2009	Zemeslodes	Tru
2009	Apēst tevi	Tru
2009	(Back of Your) Drawer	Pandemiya
2009	Life Jacket Under Your Seat	Pandemiya
2009	Kvik Myndir	Pandemiya
2010	Born to Die	Tru
2011	Pilnīgi viens	Tru
2011	The Time Is Now	Tru
2011	Lie Down (Viss ir otrādāk) feat. Gustavo	Tru
2011	Pieturi mani sev klāt	Tru
2013	Don't Hold Onto Me	Procrastination

=== Videos ===
Song	Director	Year
Apēst tevi	Ksenija Sundejeva-Zaķe	2009
Kvik myndir	Ksenija Sundejeva-Zaķe	2010
Pilnīgi viens	Ivars Trautmanis and Eduards Zaiganovs	2011
Aeon River	Ksenija Sundejeva-Zaķe	2013
Don't Hold Onto Me	Uģis Olte	2013
Heartcore	Indriķis Ģelzis	2013
