= Marju Länik =

Estonian singer (born 1957)

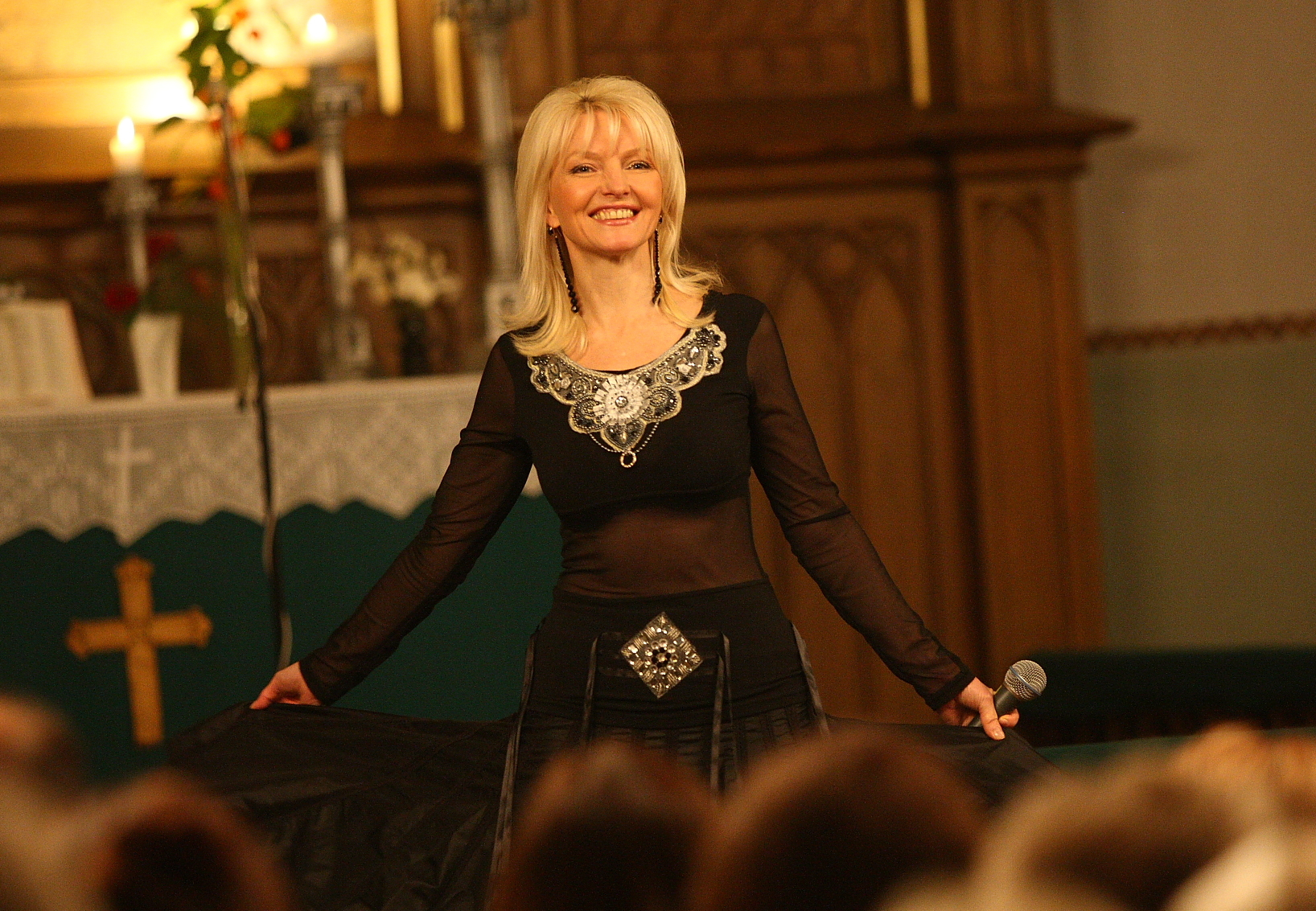
Marju Länik at her jubilee concert at Tartu Peetri Church in 2007

Marju Länik (born 7 September 1957) is an Estonian singer.

== Biography ==
Länik began singing in the early 1970s in her hometown of Otepää. In 1975, he graduated from Otepää Secondary School and in the summer of the same year she became a soloist of the Estonian National Philharmonic. Greater recognition came at the end of the decade in participating at the Eesti Televisioon programme "Kaks Takti Ette" and being in the music film "Suveviisid Võrtsjärvel". At the same time, she was a soloist in the Tallinn Philharmonic Orchestra's version of Vana Toomas, singing with sisters Ele Kõlar and Kaja Kõlar. Concerts were given in Moscow, Kiev, Leningrad, Riga and elsewhere. From 1977 to 1979, she sang in Otepää in the ensemble Nustago and the trio Sarm.

Later, in the 1980s, she performed with bands such as Vitamiin, Mobile, Music Seif, Kontakt, Mahavok, and others, which received recognition in the Soviet Union.

Länik has been a soloist at several international competitions, including Intertalent and Vilnius Towers. Concert tours have also led her to Finland, Cuba, Yugoslavia and Czechoslovakia. In 1985, she participated in a cultural program held at Gorky Park with ensemble Mahavok in Moscow at the World Festival of Youth and Students.

After the 1986 Chernobyl disaster, she and Mahavok visited closed areas in Ukraine, where several thousands of participants, including Estonian workers, were given a series of very emotional concerts.

Länik participates in summer tours, and has released albums such as "Naerdes ja naeratades" (1997), "Ti Amo" (2002), "Best of Marju Länik 1" (2007) and "Best of Marju Länik 2" (2007), and participated in numerous TV shows, including in Eesti Laul 2018, where she failed to qualify for the final.

She studied at Tallinn University from 2001 to 2005, earning a bachelor's degree cum laude in the field of cultural and art management. She later earned a master's degree cum laude in the same field in 2007.

== Repertoire ==
Much of Länik's work consists of original pieces, written in particular by Mikk Targo, Heini Vaikmaa, Lauri Laubre and Ivar Männik. Her most famous hits are "Ikka jälle", "Karikakar", "Ma olen ju naine", "Head uut aastat", "Suvekuninganna", "Päikesemaa", "Kui sul on raske", "Varjude mäng", "Naerdes ja naeratades", with part of them also sung in Russian. She has recorded about 150 songs in different formations. She has written the lyrics to a few singles by herself ("Rokk on popp", "Ükskõik").

== Political activity ==
Länik was elected to Tallinn City Council for the Reform Party from 2005 to 2010. In the 2007 Riigikogu elections, Länik received 201 votes and was not elected.

== Awards ==
- 1986 – Medal "For Labour Valour" (Moscow)
