= My Federation =

- Origin: Brighton, England
- Genres: Indie rock, garage rock
- Years active: 2005–2009
- Labels: Eye Industries (UK)
- Members: Lee Muddy Baker; Neil Mackenzie; Dylan Amey; Greg Saunders; Robin Waterson

My Federation were an indie rock outfit based band in Brighton, England. The band were fronted and driven by artist and producer Lee Muddy Baker.

In 2007, "Honey Bee", the band's debut single, was championed by BBC 6 Music's Breakfast Show DJ Shaun Keaveny, winning the people's vote in his inaugural 'Band Aid' feature. The band's debut EP, also titled Honey Bee, was released by Eye Industries on 30 April 2007 and received widespread coverage, including TV play on MTV Two and airplay on Xfm and Kerrang radio.

My Federation's debut album Don't Wanna Die was released in April 2008, along with their second single of the same name. The releases coincided with the band being the support act for James's 2008 Spring UK tour.

In May 2008, the band appeared on the popular BBC TV programme The Culture Show.

The band toured Europe in the summer of 2008, playing at various festivals in the UK, France, Switzerland and Latvia. In the autumn of 2008, EA Sports used "What Gods Are These", from the album Don't Wanna Die, in the soundtrack of their football game FIFA 09.

The band had plans for a second album and a UK tour in 2009 but soon after keyboardist Greg Saunders left the band and their appearance at South by Southwest (SXSW) in Austin, Texas proved to be their last public show. The band split up shortly thereafter, although it was commonly felt that the departure of Saunders had left the band directionless and emotionally bereft.

== Discography ==
- Don't Wanna Die (2008)

| No. | Title | Length |
|---|---|---|
| 1. | "Don't Wanna Die" | 3:11 |
| 2. | "Open My Eyes" | 2:25 |
| 3. | "What Gods Are These" | 3:54 |
| 4. | "It All Comes Clear" | 3:15 |
| 5. | "Nothing to Say" | 2:57 |
| 6. | "Honey Bee" | 3:04 |
| 7. | "The Rising Light" | 3:32 |
| 8. | "Party Offender" | 4:23 |
| 9. | "Paper and String" | 2:36 |
| 10. | "Tom Tom" | 3:08 |
| 11. | "Honey For the Soul" | 3:05 |
| 12. | "Something's Gotta Give" | 4:40 |
