= Rīgas Modes =

Latvian pop band

Rīgas Modes is a pop band formed in 2008 in Ogre, Latvia. Originally named "Komjaunatne" (Komsomol), the band first consisted of singer-songwriter Kalvis Bormanis, guitarist Reinis Papulis, back-vocalist and keyboardist Madara Gaile, bass player Andris Apīnis and drummer Mareks Ameriks. Throughout the years, the band's lineup has changed and now consists of Kalvis Bormanis, Reinis Papulis, Madara Gaile, bass player Andris Apīnis and drummer Mareks Ameriks.

The band debuted as Rīgas Modes with their first single "Naktslokāls" ("Nightclub") in 2014.

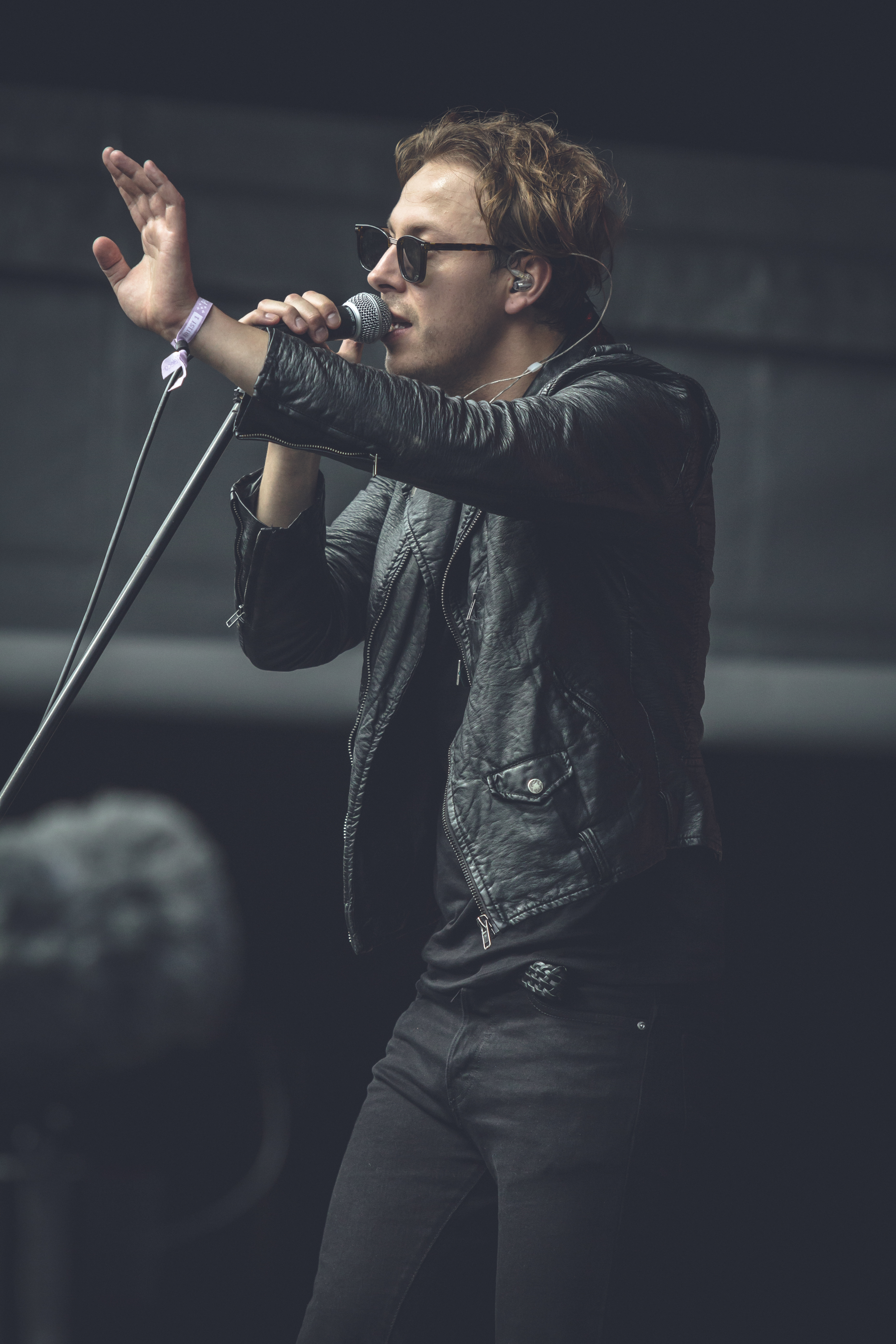

The band's popularity grew throughout the 2010s, with their first public appearance coming at the Palladium Riga concert hall in 2012 when the band was chosen as a warm-up act for Brooklyn's indie-rockers DIIV.

The members of Rīgas Modes each have their own musical influences, but as a whole they admit to being influenced by such musicians as INXS and Ramones,Fleetwood Mac as well as some Latvian artists, f.e. the band Pērkons (“Thunder”) and Satellites LV.

The band's first single and EP were released in 2014. The following year they released another single from their second release – first full-length album called "Fantastiski". This album established the band in the music industry and allowed them to reach a wider audience. In late 2016 they released another 2 songs- "32. decembris" and a cover of "Igaunijā sniegs".

"Redz kā tu ar mani!" is a single from an album in honor of legendary Latvian singer and songwriter Mārtiņš Freimanis, who died in 2011.

In August 2019 the band released their first single "Savvaļas Zirgi" from upcoming second full-length album.

== Background ==
=== Formation ===
In the beginning of band's formation process, the lead vocalist Kalvis Bormanis with his brother Mārcis Bormanis were playing in a garage in their hometown Ogre. Later on when they moved to Riga, they were researching music forums and the band's guitarist Reinis Papulis responded. Papulis was then musically partnered with a bass player Matīss Aprups with whom they both joined Bormanis’ brothers. The four of them played a small gig in a concert organized by the club Depo and as they say, they “got their 20 minutes of fame” that time. Currently Matīss Aprups isn't a part of Rīgas Modes since he later moved to Denmark.

It was when Anete joined in 2010 that the band obtained their current line-up. At the time they had 2 guitars, a bass and drums. Then came the idea that they need a keyboard and someone who could properly play it. Anete had been Kalvis' schoolmate, but they hadn't spoken to each other before. Anete joined them for a rehearsal in Riga and since then has become a legitimate band member. The band made their first public debut as a warm-up act for Brooklyn's indie-rockers DIIV at the Palladium Riga concert hall in 2012.

Rīgas Modes has mentioned in interviews that they don't plan on singing in English in the future but consider Danish. Currently all of their music is in Latvian.

=== Name ===
Before the current name, band was known as “Komjaunatne” (Komsomol) which some Latvian politicians considered inappropriate because of Latvia's negative past relations with the USSR. Because of respect and lack of desire for this dispute, as well as tiredness from justifying the fact that the name “Komjaunatne” had nothing to do with politics, musicians chose to become “Rīgas Modes”.

=== Influences ===
As the band's musical influences, members and critics have mentioned such artists as INXS, Scritti Politti, Orange Juice, Phil Collins, Van Halen, Pulp, Ramones, Pērkons, Credo and Satellites LV. RM emphasises that they are very particular with which songs and bands they cover and some of their chosen pieces include "Kamēr es tevi mīlēju" by Pērkons ("Whilst I loved you") and "Zini" by A-Eiropa ("Know"). Latvian music critics have compared them to Pulp, and described them as one of the most original Latvian bands.

== Releases ==
=== EP Rīgas Modes ===
In 2014 the band came out with a retro-pop debut EP "Rīgas Modes". It is often known as a small concept-album, which unites 5 songs through the topic of Riga suburban nightlife. It is said that the lead singer's Kalvis' voice is somewhat alike to Jarvis Cocker's, and similar with the way Pulp used to, in this mini album musicians also focus on the life of “working men” with irony and not taking themselves too seriously.

=== First full-length album "Fantastiski" ===
While writing "Fantastiski" ("Fantastic"), the band knew that they wanted to write a pop music album with their own twist. There are 11 songs summarized in the album under the topic of "teenager problems and the battle with bad habits". Album was released in 2016 and not long before the release date they released a single from the album – "Boifrendi".

The song "Boifrendi" ("Boyfriends") was the one that in the beginning of 2016 allowed them to reach a wider audience, letting more listeners become a part of the fandom. According to Latvian music critics, captivating melodies and ironic, engaging lyrics were the key to their success. Possibly, because the chorus of "Boifrendi" is autobiographical – at a time when Kalvis worked in a radio station Pieci.lv, he met a girl in a bar, whose interest disappeared when a popular news broadcaster appeared next to Kalvis – this song is considered the one that made RM popular in Latvian pop music. However, their first full-length album "Fantastiski" ("Fantastic") brought them to their first Austras balva (The Austra Prize is the Latvian equivalent to the British Mercury Prize and Canadian Polaris Music Award) and Zelta Mikrofons ("The Golden Microphone" is the annual Golden Music Prize for music has been the annual award ceremony of the best Latvian musicians since 1995 and is the most prestigious Latvian music award), where they won over Latvian pop star Dons.

The recording of "Fantastiski" was done in the concert hall Palladium as well as "Tru Music Studio" was done by sound engineer Gatis Zaķis, who altogether with the band is also the producer of the album.

Latvian hip-hop artist Ansis performed as a guest artist in the song "Viņa ir Ballītes" ("She is Parties"), and also performed live with the band afterwards.

=== "32. decembris" / "Igaunijā Sniegs" ===
The band has also recorded a 2-song extended play with a single "32. decembris" ("December 32") which was released in 2016. As a b-side of this 7-inch limited edition vinyl plate, the band also recorded a cover of 1990's cult band's "Nejautā" ("Don't Ask") song "Igaunijā sniegs" ("Snow in Estonia").

=== Other projects ===
In April 2018 RM released a version of the song "Redz kā tu ar mani!" ("Look, how you are with me") which was included in the Latvian band Tumsa ("Darkness") album "Spēlējot debesis" ("Playing the sky"). This happened in collaboration with a Latvian music publishing company MicRec in honor of Tumsa lead singer Mārtiņš Freimanis. It is planned to release an album in honor of him in 2018 – "Mans draugs – Mārtiņš Freimanis" ("My friend – Mārtiņš Freimanis"), in which Latvian bands Rīgas Modes, Musiqq, Labvēlīgais tips, Līvi, Z-Scars, Refleksija and solo artists Lauris Reiniks and Rūta Reinika, Artūrs Gruzdiņš, Aija Andrejeva, Olga Rajecka, Katrīna Bindere and Kārlis Būmeisters have recorded their own versions of Freimanis' songs. "Redz kā tu ar mani!" version by RM was released as the first one because of how much it differs from the original of this song.

== Members ==
- Kalvis Bormanis – lead vocals;
- Reinis Papulis – guitars, keyboards;
- Madara Gaile – keyboards, backing vocals;
- Andris Apīnis – bass;
- Mareks Ameriks – drums;

=== Former members ===
- Mārcis Bormanis – drums;
- Matīss Aprups – bass;
- Pauls Ķierpe – drums;
- Anete Stuce – keyboard, backing vocals;

== Discography ==
=== Albums ===
Title	Release date	Label	Awards	Track listing
Fantastiski	11 April 2016	Rīgas Modes	Zelta Mikrofons	1. Kāpēc Tad, Kad Es Izskatos Vislabāk Uz Mani Neviens Neskatās (Why When I Look the Best No One Looks At Me) (4:06); 2. Jauna Draudzene (New Girlfriend) (3:18); 3. Boifrendi (Boyfriends) (3:44); 4. Linda Leen (3:41); 5. Melodrāma (Melodrama) (3:47); 6. 90-Tie (90's) (4:31); 7. Viņa Ir Ballītes (feat. Ansis) (She Is Parties) (3:13); 8. Skaisti Zēni Būtu Neglītas Meitenes (Beautiful Boys Would Be Ugly Girls) (3:57); 9. Skonto Rezervisti (Reserve of the Skonto) (3:51); 10. Pieķerti Nozieguma Vietā (Caught In a Crime Scene) (4:02); 11. Beigas Būs Traģiskas (The End Will Be Tragic) (4:53)
Patiesie Nodomi	15 October 2021	Rīgas Modes		

=== Extended plays ===
Title	Release date	Label	Awards	Track listing
Rīgas Modes	18 May 2014	Rīgas Modes	Zelta Mikrofons	1. Rīgas Modes (Riga Fashion) (3:46); 2. Naktslokāls (Nightclub) (2:46) 3. 2922208 (3:10); 4. Guļamistabas disko (Bedroom Disco) (6:48) 5. Evelīna un Es (Evelina and Me) (5:17)
32. decembris	28 November 2016	Rīgas Modes		1. 32. decembris (December 32) (4:29); 2. Igaunijā Sniegs (Snow In Estonia) (4:18)

=== Singles ===
Title	Release date
Naktslokāls (Nightclub)	2014
Es nesaprotu (I Don't Understand)	2015
Boifrendi (Boyfriends)	2016
32. decembris (December 32)	2016
Redz kā tu ar mani! (Look, how you are with me!)	2018
Savvaļas Zirgi (Wild Horses)	2019
Mēs Braucām Visu Nakti (We Drove All Night	2019
