= Trad.Attack! =

Estonian musical group

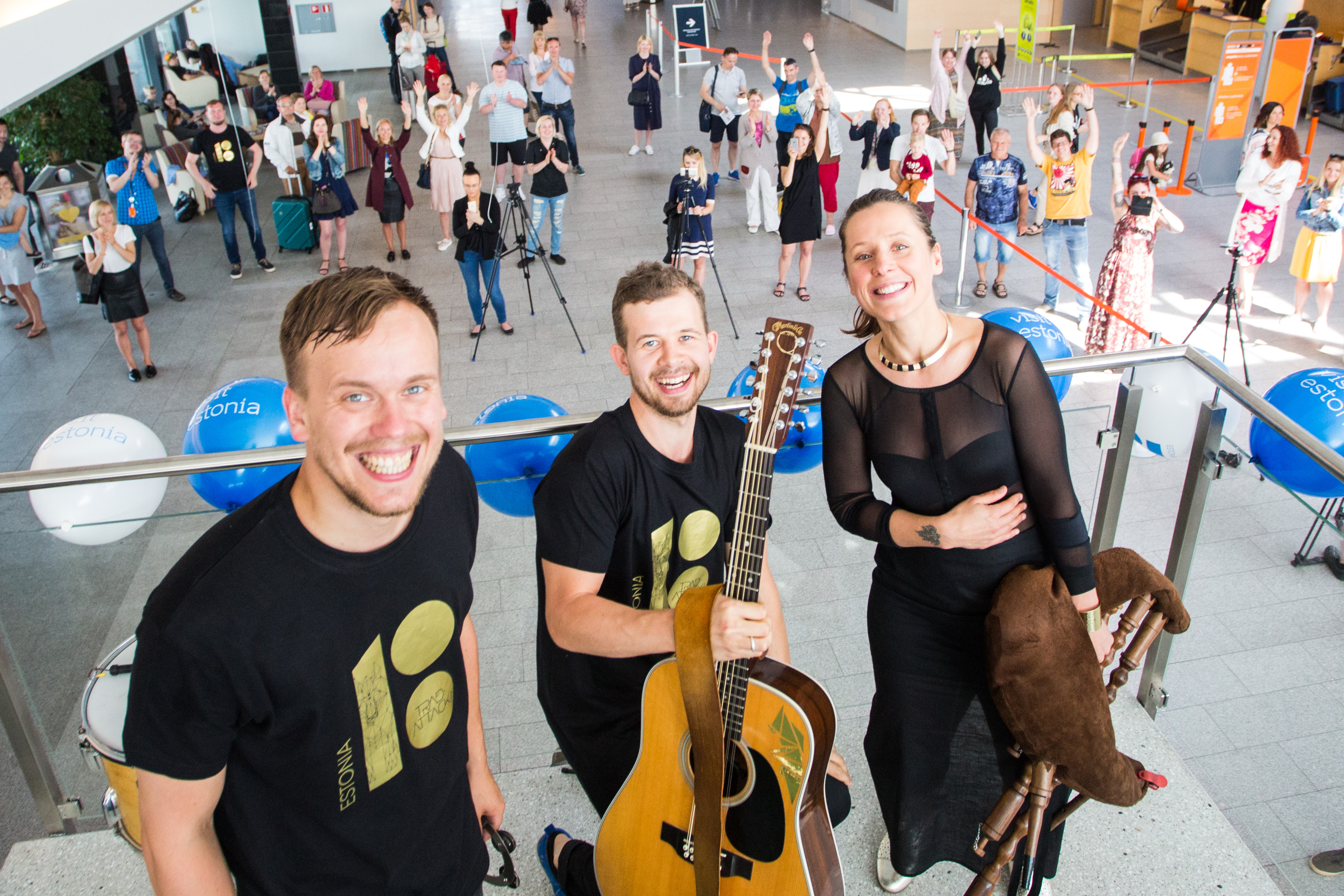
- TradAttack! at Tallinn Airport

Background information
- Origin: Estonia
- Years active: 2013–present
- Labels: Trad.Attack! Music, Made in Baltics, Nordic Notes
- Members: Sandra Sillamaa; Jalmar Vabarna; Tõnu Tubli
- Website: tradattack.ee

Trad.Attack! is an Estonian band which consists of Sandra Sillamaa (torupill, vocals), Jalmar Vabarna (guitar, vocals), and Tõnu Tubli (drums, vocals). They sing in Estonian or Estonian dialects.

== History ==
Before starting the new band project in 2013, all three band members were successful as musicians on their own. The bagpipe player and vocalist Sandra Sillamaa has an academic degree in folk culture/music studies. The original idea was to form a group performing Estonian folk music inspired by old traditional folk music and contemporary music. Trad.Attack! sometimes uses samples from archive recordings as the lead vocals and backs them with their own original rock, pop, and electronic instrumentals.

At their first concert, they joked onstage about having a master plan: to be up to perform in every country in the world. Within eight years, Trad.Attack! played in 39 countries. The band played at many showcase-festivals including Tallinn Music Week (Estonia), Folk Alliance (US), V-ROX (Russia), Eurosonic (the Netherlands), Sound of the Xity and Strawberry Festival (China), Minas Musica Mundo (Brazil), WOMEX (Spain), Trans Musicales Festival (France), WOMAD (Chile), Summerfolk Music and Crafts Festival (Canada), and the Woodford Folk Festival (Queensland, Australia).

The eleven tracks of their fourth full-length studio album Make Your Move (2020) extend the boundaries of the folk genre with distorted guitars, floor-filling beats and effect pedal manipulated bagpipes. They want to have a stage sound as big as a trio can produce by technical means. Drummer Tõnu Tubli plays also trombone. All songs were tested to work for big festival stage audiences as well as unplugged. They released MYMIATURES - Songs That Never Grew Up in 2020. It features short tracks of songs that already made it to Make Your Move as well as tracks that for now have remained to an idea level.

In 2021 the band released We Miss Playing for You, an album of live recordings. In 2022 Trad.Attack! collaborated with 19 remixers and released Remixed, an album with remixes from the band's discography.

On March 31, 2023 Trad.Attack! released their fifth studio album Bring It On. The album was nominated for Ethno/Folk Album of The Year at the Estonian Music Awards 2024. "Bring It On" won Album of The Year award at the Estonian pop music awards "Kuldne Plaat 2024".

Their last performance before an indefinite hiatus was at Viljandi Folk Music Festival on 25th of June 2025.

== Band members ==
- Sandra Sillamaa – bagpipe, vocals
- Jalmar Vabarna – guitar, vocals
- Tõnu Tubli – drums, vocals

== Discography ==
Albums

- AH! (2015)
- Kullakarva (2017)
- Make Your Move (2020)
- MYMIATURES - Songs That Never Grew Up (2020)
- We Miss Playing for You (2021)
- Remixed (2022)
- Bring It On (2023)

Extended plays

- Trad.Attack! (2014)

== Recognition ==
Trad.Attack! is the winner of:

- Estonian pop music award "Golden Album 2024" - Band and Album of the Year
- Estonian Ethno Music Awards 2023 - Album of The Year
- Tartu's Cultural Event of The Year 2022: Make Your Moval Final concert at Tartu Song Festival Grounds
- Estonian pop music award "Golden Album 2021" - Band and Album of the Year
- Estonian Music Awards 2021 - Song & Ethno/Folk Album of The Year
- Estonian Foreign Ministry's Culture Prize 2020 for successful concert activities and promotion of Estonian culture abroad
- Estonian Ethno Music Awards 2020 - Band and Song of the Year
- Estonian pop music award "Golden Album 2018" – Most Sold Band CD of the Year & Most Sold Vinyl of the Year in Estonia
- Estonian Music Awards 2018 – Ethno/Folk Album and Band of the Year
- Estonian Ethno Music Awards 2017 – Album, Band and Song of the Year
- Estonian Ethno Music Awards 2016 – Best Band
- Estonian Music Awards 2016, – Best Band, Best Album, Best Ethno/Folk Album
- Estonian Ethno Music Awards 2015 – Best Band, Best Album and Best Song
- Estonian Music Awards 2015 – Ethno/Folk album and Music Video of the year
- Estonian Ethno Music Awards 2014 – Best Band, Best Album, Best Song, Best Newcomer, Raadio 2 special award
