= Tribes of the City =

Latvian musical group

- Origin: Riga, Latvia
- Genres: shoegaze, dream pop
- Years active: 2003–present
- Members: Ksenija Sundejeva; Ints Barkāns; Sergejs Jaramisjans; Ivars Pommers
- Past members: Juris Justs; Mihails Sergejevs; Andrejs Vasiļjevs; Staņislavs Kuļikovs
- Website: https://tribesofthecity.bandcamp.com/

Tribes of the City is a shoegaze, dreampop band from Riga, Latvia. The band was formed in 2003 and as of 2026 has recorded five full-length albums. They have gained a nationwide success, won multiple Latvian music awards and were nominated for MTV Europe Music Awards 2007 as the best Baltic act. The band received an Austra's Award for their 2019 record Rust and Gold named Best Album of 2019 in Latvia.

== History ==
Their first album Running to the Sun was released on Melo Records in 2004 under the name The Movies. The band changed their name to Tribes of the City in 2005.

Band's second album For the Sleepy People was produced by Greg Haver, who is known for his work with such bands as Manic Street Preachers, Super Furry Animals and Catatonia.

In 2009 the band teamed up with Gatis Zakis and produced their third record, this time a double Recipe of the Golden Dream.

In 2019, a decade after the previous album, Tribes of the City independently released Rust and Gold on vinyl and major streaming platforms. It was produced by Adam Cooper of Alison's Halo at Jetpack Studios (Chicago, IL) and mastered by Brian Wenckebach at Electric Blue Studios (Blooklyn, NY).

Their album Rust and Gold has been nominated for IMPALA's European Independent Album of the Year Award (2019).

Their fifth album, Evidence of Embrace, was released on the Latvian label Wild Nude on February 27, 2026.

== Discography ==
=== Albums ===
Year	Title
2004	Running to the Sun
2006	For the Sleepy People
2009	Recipe of the Golden Dream
2019	Rust and Gold
2026	Evidence of Embrace

=== Radio singles ===
Year	Title	Peak chart positions
Year	Title	LAT
From Running to the Sun
2004	"Grace"	24
2004	"Running to the Sun"	33
2005	"Falling Down"	24
From For the Sleepy People
2006	"A Day in the City"	4
2006	"A Dream"	26
From Recipe of the Golden Dream
2008	"Snow Tiger"	38
2008	"Paralleli"	47
From Rust and Gold
2017	"Rust and Gold"	
2018	"Parasitic"	
2019	"More Waves"	
