= Hospitāļu iela =

Latvian musical group

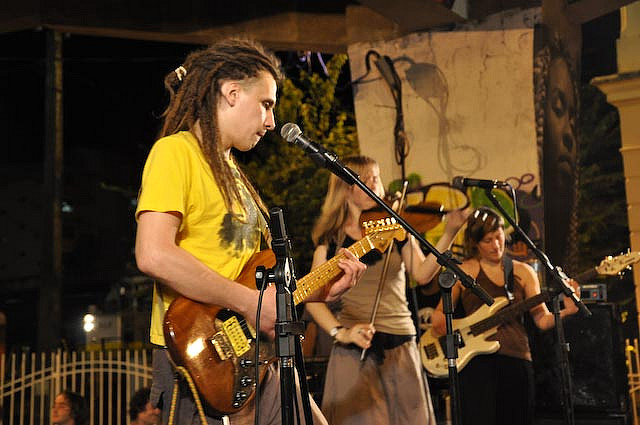

Background information
- Origin: Riga, Latvia
- Genres: Reggae
- Years active: 1997–2012, 2025–present
- Members: Edgars Šubrovskis; Dina Skreitule; Anna Andersone; Maija Ušča; Toms Circenis
- Past members: Kristīne Augstkalne; Astrīda Konstante; Krists Poreiters; Jēkabs Kacens; Anna Lebedoka; Laima Ivule
- Website: hospitaluiela.lv

Hospitāļu iela is a Latvian band formed in 1997. The core member of the band was songwriter and singer Edgars Šubrovskis. The group's name is identical to the name of a street in Brasa, Riga.

After a rocky start, in 1999 the group began actively performing and rehearsing. After multiple hiatuses and changes in the lineup, the first album Pilnmēness ('Full Moon') was finally issued in 2004.

Ultimately, the band played its last concert during an unveiling of a compilation indie album Strāvoklis on 4 May 2011. Šubrovskis later on founded the band Ansamblis Manta, and after its breakup joined the band Juuk.

In 2012 the band released a final live album titled HI to officially mark the end of the group’s journey.

== Discography ==
=== Albums ===
Year	Title
2004	Pilnmēness
2005	Nav centrs
2007	Pūķis
2012	HI

== Videography ==
=== Music videos ===
Year	Title
2005	"Kaķis"
