= DAGAMBA =

Latvian band

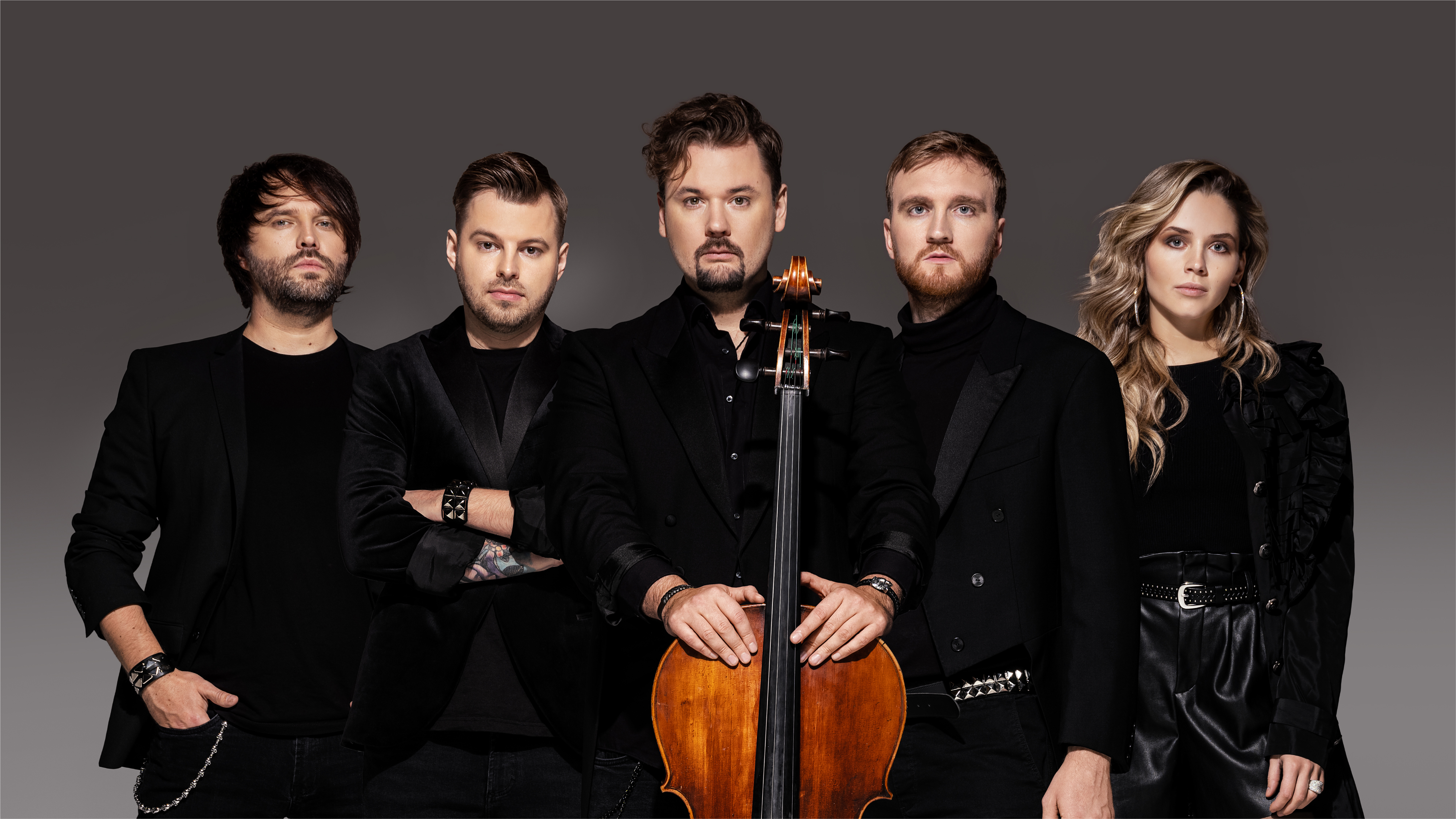

Background information
- Origin: Latvia
- Genres: Crossover, Rock, Pop, Classical, World
- Years active: 2011–present
- Members: Valters Pūce; Antons Trocjuks; Alise Broka; Dainis Tenis; Artūrs Jermaks
- Website: dagamba.eu/

DAGAMBA is a Latvian band formed in 2011. The group consists of five members: cellist Valters Pūce, cellist Antons Trocjuks, pianist Dainis Tenis, double bass player Alise Broka and drummer Artūrs Jermaks. Throughout DAGAMBA's existence, they have released six albums. The group has performed in Latvia, USA, Ukraine, Lithuania, China, Poland, Italy, Russia, Australia, Estonia, Turkey, United Kingdom and other countries. The most recent album that they have released is called "Bach Against the Machine".

== History ==
DAGAMBA is an instrumental band celebrated for its inventive fusion of classical, rock, and world music elements. The group was established in 2011 by Latvian cellist Valters Pūce, initially featuring cellist Antons Trocjuks and beat maker Ričards Čerenkovs (2011-2013). In 2015, percussionist Hamidreza Rahbaralam (2015-2020) and pianist Dainis Tenis joined the ensemble. The band further expanded in 2016 with the addition of drummer Artūrs Jermaks and welcomed double bass player Alise Broka in 2020.

DAGAMBA's music is noted for its distinctive blend of rock, pop, world, and classical influences, creating a unique sound that combines various cultural elements. Their debut single, “Aplis” (“Circle”), was released on August 24, 2011.

== Group members ==
Cellist Valters Puce graduated from Emils Darzins Music High School and Jāzeps Vītols Latvian Academy of Music. He has won several international competitions - "Concertino Prague", "Music World 2000 Festival Internazionale Fivizzano", "Terem Crossover Competition". Antons Trocjuks also graduated from Emils Darzins Music High school, then graduated from Nikolay Rimsky - Korsakov Music College in Saint Petersburg. He has won competitions including the "Terem Crossover Competition", Igor Mravinsky's cellist contest in Saint Petersburg, "J. F. Docauer" new cellist contest in Germany, Carl Davidov's cellist contest, International Competition of 21st Century Virtuoso in Moscow, International Music Tournament in Germany, as well as the Competition for Musicians of all Instruments in Italy.

== Discography ==
Since their formation, DAGAMBA has released six albums. In 2012 they released an album called “New life”. Their album presentation happened in a restaurant called “Ar mani atkal runā kaijas” (“Gulls talk to me again”). Dagamba's second album “Recycled” (2015) includes compositions from ballet “Romeo and Juliet” and Johann Sebastian Bach, Friedrich Georg Hendel music that are combined with jazz and rock and roll pieces. In 2016 group released an album “Seasons”. Many artists performed at the album release concert - Aminata Savadogo, Ralfs Eilands and “Latvian Voices”. The group's fourth album Ludwig van Rammstein (2017) was mostly made by combining classical musician Ludwig van Beethoven music with the metal group Rammstein's music. The fifth studio album, Dagamba feat. Tchaikovsky, released in 2019, features compositions by Pyotr Ilyich Tchaikovsky reimagined in a fresh and modern sound.

Bach Against the Machine, Dagamba's sixth and latest album, released in 2023.

== Concerts ==
In 2017 they had concerts in several cities in Latvia (Riga, Jelgava, Rezekne, Ventspils, Liepaja, Cesis) to promote their album “Ludwig van Rammstein”.

On April 12, 2019, Dagamba hosted one of their largest concerts in Latvia, making their debut at "Arena Riga" with a crowd of approximately 7,000 attendees. The event featured performances from their latest album, Dagamba feat. Tchaikovsky, as well as some of their most popular compositions from previous albums. The concert opened with a performance by the string quartet "Sotto Voce," who played original Tchaikovsky music. Throughout the evening, Dagamba was joined by guest artists, including the ethnic music group "Tautumeitas," violinist Daniils Bulajevs, double bassist Alise Broka, the Riga Dome Boys Choir, rapper Mesa, and dancers choreographed by Liene Grava.

The group has also performed several times in Russia to promote their album Seasons, Ludwig van Rammstein and Dagamba feat Tchaikovsky. They have also had concerts in Estonia, Turkey and Australia.

The largest concert to date took place on June 3, 2023, at the Mežaparks Great Bandstand. The event featured the band's latest concert program, "Bach Against the Machine." With this concert program, Dagamba has completed a tour across Latvia, China, Lithuania, Estonia, Poland, and Germany.
