= Annual Latvian Music Recording Awards =

Award for Latvian musicians

The Annual Latvian Music Recording Award "Golden Microphone" (Latvian: Latvijas Mūzikas ierakstu gada balva Zelta Mikrofons) is the annual award for the best Latvian musicians. The award was established in 1995 (for music on 1994) under the name Mikrofona Gada Balva (Microphone of the Year Award) and renamed since 1997 (for year of 1996). It was dubbed "the Latvian Grammy".

== Awards by year ==
- 2010:
- 2011:
- 2012:
