= Rock music in Estonia =

The Estonian rock music scene saw its beginnings in the mid-1960s during Khrushchev Thaw in the Soviet Union and the rise of British bands all over the world. The first Estonian rock-groups were primarily high school bands playing cover versions of the current UK Top 10. Despite the lack of official support from Soviet authorities (rock music was seen as undesirable Western influence) some of these groups, posing as dance music bands in various clubs, gained a large underground following. Some groups managed to make proper studio recordings and appear a couple of times on television.

The most notable groups of the 1960s were Juuniorid (the first, formed in 1963), Optimistid, Mikronid, Kontrastid and Virmalised.

During the late 1960s and early 1970s, as both rock and roll and the young Estonian musicians aged, the music became much more complex. Progressive rock, with hard rock influences, began to become more prevalent in Estonia. Musicians from the sixties, who continued their musical career either became established pop-stars or became interested in progressive rock. So called progressive or intellectual rock could be an indulgence, a way to prove the Soviet authorities that rock music could have a deeper meaning. Because of the lack of proper gear some young engineers like Härmo Härm started to make equipment like synthesizers for rock bands. During the seventies Estonian bands began touring in the Soviet Union, some of them becoming quite popular. The first EPs and LPs were released under the Melodiya label.

The most notable groups of the 1970s were Ruja, Gunnar Graps Group, Meie, In Spe and Apelsin.

The early eighties saw the rise of punk rock in Estonia. This rise could be described as a return to the basics. Much like early Estonian rock music was a copy of the UK Top 10 back in the sixties, the new Estonian punk music was highly influenced by UK77 and UK82 raw punk rock. American bands were unreachable. Much like rock music in the 1960s, punk rock was highly disliked by the Soviet authorities. Besides punk rock, the Estonian rock scene in the eighties had its own answer to everything that was going on in the free world - heavy metal, new romantics, and synthpop. However, there was a few years of delay between the Estonian scene and the rest of the world. Despite this, Estonia remained a step ahead of the rest of the Soviet Union and during the perestroika period a few underground bands like J.M.K.E. and Röövel Ööbik became well known in Finland.

The most notable bands of the 1980s were: Generator M, Radar, Rock Hotel, Vitamiin, J.M.K.E., and Singer Vinger.

The nineties saw the fall of music and musicians from previous decades. Youth, looking for something new as usual, got the first taste of electronic. In the early 1990s there were simultaneous small-scale outbreaks of indie rock and metal. A punk survivor from the 1980s - Vennaskond saw mainstream popularity and gained a large following, becoming arguably the most influential Estonian rock band ever. The late 1990s were the low point of the Estonian rock scene. Acts from the first half of the decade continued with minor success, and no new big acts appeared.

The most notable bands of the 1990s were: Vennaskond, Terminaator, The Tuberkuloited, Blind, Smilers and Psychoterror.

The new millennium has seen the slow but continuous rise of rock music. Currently strong metal and indie scenes exist, and Estonia has one of the highest rates of metal bands per capita in the world.

== Estonian rock artists and bands ==
- Agent M
- Ans. Andur
- Apelsin
- Blacky
- Bedwetters
- Claire's Birthday
- Crystal Cloisters
- Ewert and The Two Dragons
- Gunnar Graps Group
- Herald
- Illumenium
- J.M.K.E.
- Kosmikud
- Linnu Tee
- Liblikas
- Magnetic Band
- Metsatöll
- Nevesis
- No-Big-Silence
- Pantokraator
- Progress
- Propeller
- Põhja Konn
- Rock Hotel
- Röövel Ööbik
- Ruja
- Singer Vinger
- Smilers
- Tanel Padar & The Sun
- Terminaator
- The Princes
- The Tuberkuloited
- Ultima Thule
- Vanilla Ninja
- Vennaskond
- Winny Puhh
- Ziggy Wild
