= Vjatšeslav Kobrin =

Russian musician (1958–2016)

Vjatšeslav Kobrin Vjatšeslav Kobrin Вячеслав Кобрин
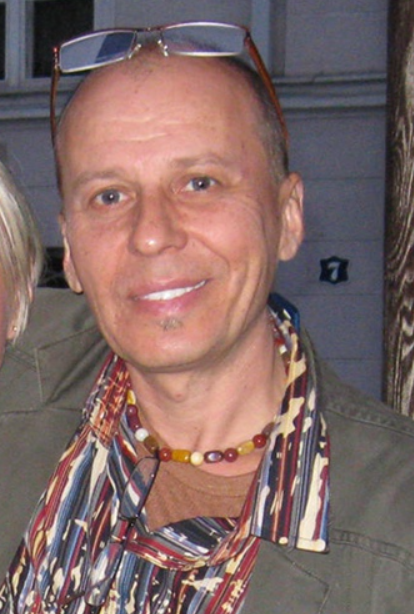

Background information
- Also known as: Slavka Kobrin; Vyacheslav Kobrin
- Born: Vjatšeslav Kobrin; 11 April 1958; Cherepovets, Vologda Oblast, Russia
- Origin: Cherepovets
- Died: 23 April 2016 (aged 58) Manuel Antonio, Costa Rica
- Genres: Rock, blues rock
- Instrument: Guitar
- Formerly of: Rok-Sentyabr, Gunnar Graps and Magnetic Band, Jaak Joala and Lainer, Kobrin Blues Band and Ultima Thule, Michael Pickett, David Rotundo

Vjatšeslav "Slavka" Kobrin (also transliterated: Vyacheslav Kobrin, Russian: Вячеслав Кобрин, 11 April 1958 in Cherepovets, Russia – 23 April 2016 in Manuel Antonio, Costa Rica) was a Russian guitarist and songwriter.

Kobrin was born in Cherepovets, Russia, in the family of musicians. His father was director of a philharmonic and his mother was a choirmaster. At the music school, Kobrin studied flute.

In 1979, Kobrin founded the rock group Rok-Sentyabr (Rock September) in Cherepovets. Kobrin played the guitar and the flute, and sang as well. In 1982–1983, he collaborated with Yuri Shevchuk and DDT in recording of DDT's album Monolog v Saigone (Monologue in Saigon), later renamed to Kompromiss (Compromise).

In the same year Estonian rock musician Gunnar Graps invited him to his Magnetic Band where Kobrin played the guitar in 1983–1984. In 1984, after Magnetic Band was forbidden performing in the Soviet Union, he joined Lainer, a band of Estonian singer Jaak Joala. In 1986, several musicians from Lainer and Muusik Seif, a band of Tõnis Mägi, formed Kobrin Blues Band, a special project to perform at Levimuusikapäevad festival in Tartu. Later the same musicians formed Ultima Thule. Kobrin together with Riho Sibul became the main songwriters of the band.

In 1990, after Ultima Thule tour in Canada, Kobrin left the band and decided to stay in Canada. He played in different bands, most significantly in the band of Michael Pickett. He became a Canadian citizen. In the Canadian period, he started with retail business by opening a store in Toronto. In 2005, he moved with family to Manuel Antonio in Costa Rica. Kobrin stopped his musician career and performed only occasionally, e.g. in Augustibluus festival in 2009 in Haapsalu and in festivals in Cherepovets in 2012–2013. In 2012, he had a reunion concert together with Ultima Thule and performed together with Canadian blues singer and blues harp player David Rotundo and a group of Estonian musicians under the name Slavka Kobrin & Friends in several concerts in Estonia and Russia, including in the Estonian national television morning program. In 2013, he performed together with an American singer and bassist James Werts and a group of Estonian and American musicians.

In April 2016, Kobrin was found lying unconscious on the floor in his bathroom. He died in hospital on 23 April 2016.

In the 1980s, Kobrin was considered one of the best blues guitarists in the Soviet Union. In his autobiographical book, Estonian writer and musician Mihkel Raud compared Kobrin with Jimi Hendrix. Kobrin himself mentioned Robben Ford, Steely Dan and Angus Young as performers who had influenced him. According to Estonian musician Jaak Ahelik, a bandmate from Magnetic Band and Ultima Thule, Kobrin liked to listen to ZZ Top, Steely Dan, AC/DC, Peer Günt, Earth Wind & Fire, Havana Black, and Prince.

Kobrin was married, he had a son.
