= Party of People's Unity (Estonia) =

Political party in Estonia

Party of People's Unity Rahva Ühtsuse Erakond
- Chairwoman: Kristiina Ojuland
- Founded: 4 September 2014; 10 years ago
- Dissolved: 18 November 2019
- Membership (2019): 505
- Ideology: Civic nationalism; Right-wing populism; Anti-Islam; Christian nationalism; Soft Euroscepticism; Anti-immigration; White nationalism; Free trade (self-proclaimed)
- Political position: Right-wing to far-right
- Colours: Beige

Website
- rue.ee

Party of People's Unity (Estonian: Rahva Ühtsuse Erakond, RÜE) was a civic nationalist anti-immigration Estonian political party active in 2014–2019.

== History ==
=== Creation ===
On 30 January 2014, 27 people, including the then-MEP Kristiina Ojuland (Reform Party), signed the founding agreement of the party United Estonia (Estonian: Ühtne Eesti, ÜE). However, theatre NO99 announced that United Estonia is an already trademark registered by them at the Patent Office and NO99 does not allow others to use it. The founders of the party then chose the new name Party of People's Unity.

In an article published in Lääne Elu in March 2014, RÜE regional manager Anita Keivabu claimed that the new party is being advertised in county newspapers with European Parliament funding. Ojuland denied the claims, stating that she pays the advertising bills herself. In response, Anita Keivabu left the party.

In the 2014 European Parliament election, RÜE supported the campaign of its leader Kristiina Ojuland. Ojuland received 3024 (0.9%) votes as an independent candidate.

=== Ojuland's leadership ===
RÜE was officially registered as a political party on 4 September 2014. On November 1, the first general assembly of RÜE was held where Kristiina Ojuland was elected as the chairwoman of the party and the party's statute and program were approved. In November 2014, RÜE started negotiations with the EKRE to participate in the next elections as a joint list. On 1 December, Ojuland announced that a joint list with EKRE would not be made due to that requiring RÜE candidates to leave their party and become members of EKRE.

On 31 January 2015, RÜE vice-chairman Peeter Reemann and board member Imre Termonen announced their departure from the party, accusing the party of lack of transparency and autocratic leadership. RÜE did not respond to Reemann's and Termonen's accusations, only commenting that both men left without explaining their motives to the general assembly and the board. On 4 February 2015, Ojuland commented on the departure of these two, stating: "I think that when the scum leaves, the organism becomes stronger." On 10 February, vice chairman Margus Annuk resigned. The party stated that Annuk went to work abroad and consequently stopped all his activities in Estonia, adding that Annuk had already informed the party about his imminent departure in December 2014.

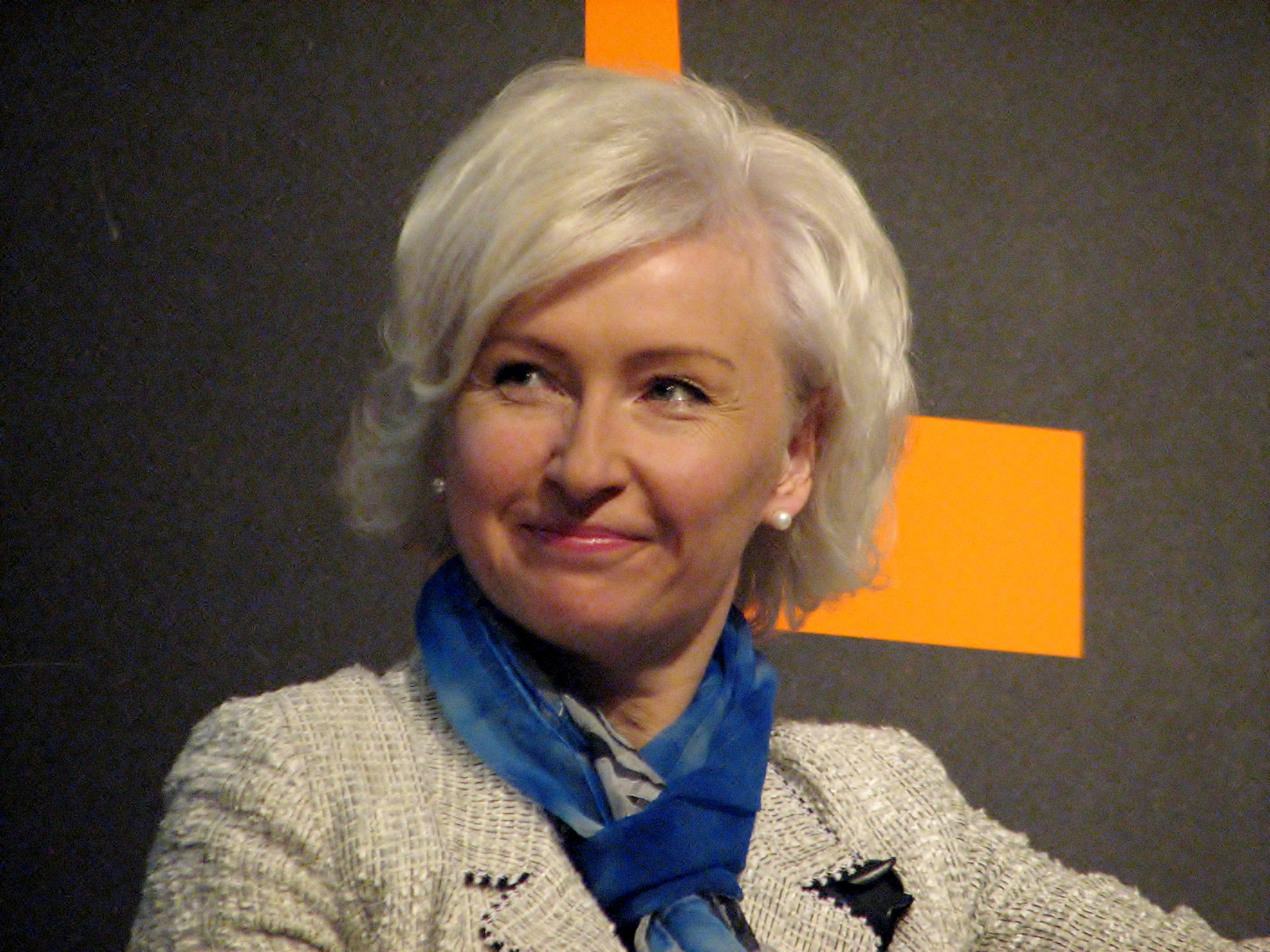
Kristiina Ojuland, chairwoman of RÜE, in 2014

Political scientist Tõnis Saarts thought that it would be difficult for the party to cross the election threshold in the 2015 parliamentary election as newcomers have a worse starting platform than others due to the lack of state support and the lack of generous private donors. Additionally, Saarts referred to Ojuland's criticism of the closure of the political system seeming insincere due to her long-time membership of the Reform Party, as well as to RÜE placing itself in the niche of already overcrowded right-wing parties like the Free Party, EKRE and IRL, adding that their ability to build a party organization is questionable.

For the 2015 election, the party published a list of 36 candidates. RÜE candidates participated in the election in all 12 constituencies. The party received 2289 (0.4%) votes of the votes and did not exceed the election threshold. Ojuland said that RÜE did not have money to run a full list and the media only talked about new parties that went to the election with a full list, leading people to have the impression that EKRE and the Free Party were the only alternatives to the old parties (Reform, Centre, IRL and SDE).

In October and November 2015, RÜE participated in the organization of anti-immigration and anti-refugee demonstrations in Tallinn and Tartu.

=== Raudsepp's leadership ===
In January 2018, cross-country skier Pavo Raudsepp was elected as the new chairman of RÜE.

In August 2018, Raudsepp announced that members of RÜE want to join another party, and negotiations have been held with the Free Party, EKRE and Isamaa. However, Raudsepp preferred to unite all four into one party. For the 2019 election, Raudsepp and board member Jane Snaith left the party to run on the list of the Free Party due to RÜE itself being unable to put up a list for the elections.

In June 2019, RÜE's general assembly supported the start of consultations with EKRE to merge. According to Raudsepp, there were no major fundamental differences between the two parties and no reason to argue over small differences.

=== Discontinuation (2019) ===
In October 2019, the board of RÜE proposed to the party's general assembly to reorganize the party into a political non-profit association, as the major goals set at the time of RÜE's creation have been realized. On 18 November, the general assembly decided to end the party's activities. According to Kristiina Ojuland, the party was to continue as foundation European National Front.

== Ideology ==
=== Assessments of political scientists ===
According to Tõnis Saarts, based on the program, RÜE can be considered an anti-Russian socio-economically right-wing political party on the border between conservatism and liberalism. According to Viljar Veebel, RÜE follows a domestically right-wing policy in the field of social and economic policy, but at the same time has promoted illiberal and far-right views against free trade.

According to Veebel, RÜE's views generally overlap with those of EKRE, though noting that there has not been a very heated competition between them. She attributes that to RÜE promoting French-style civic nationalism, unlike EKRE which appeals to ethnic Estonians. RÜE has tried to appeal to Estonian Russian-speaking people with nationalist and anti-immigration attitudes. Their version of nationalism is strengthened by a certain general Christian ideology, which includes Orthodoxy, and not so much in terms of active church members, but in terms of cultural background. In this peculiar way, Viljar Veebel believes that Ojuland and RÜE have helped integrate the Estonian and Russian-speaking communities.

According to Veebel, RÜE has publicly approved the developments in Poland and Hungary and has used the same agenda that brought radical and anti-democratic forces to power there. They oppose immigrants and attack the European Union. RÜE has been very critical of Russia's foreign and military policy, while approving of the domestic policy of Vladimir Putin, especially the defense of so-called true Christian values.

=== The party's own statements ===
As the reason for the creation of RÜE, Ojuland stated that Estonia must be repaired and the decisions made in the Riigikogu must be people-centered. The party claims its economic and political direction to be liberal free market economy and free trade. The next chairman of the party, Pavo Raudsepp, announced that the main values he wants to carry as the leader of the party are the survival of the Estonian people and language.

Before the 2015 election, the RÜE pushed for reducing public sector costs and carrying out a comprehensive reform of state and local government. One of the main messages of the party was social security. RÜE wanted to reduce the number of Riigikogu MPs from 101 to 71. RÜE also considered it important to prevent the "flight" of Estonian taxpayers' money in hundreds of millions of euros through so-called foreign banks. On 22 September, RÜE also initiated a pan-Estonian collection of signatures to ban the consumption of alcohol in public places.

In April 2016, RÜE proposed to ban the observance and promotion of the teachings of the Quran in public places in Estonia in any form. "We have decided to start collecting information from the public about cases of harassment and abuse which the mainstream media would be silent about," said the initiator of the proposal, RÜE Pärnumaa district head Triin Raidmets.

== In popular culture ==
At the end of 2015, a younger generation of singers performed a parody of the patriotic Estonian song "Ei ole üksi ükski maa" ("No Land Is Alone") in the satirical program Tujurikkuja, which ironized the widespread intolerance towards refugees, gays and simply other Estonians. The text written by Märt Avandi, Ott Sepp and Õ-Fraktsioon also named then-RÜE leader Kristiina Ojuland in the line "Me rass on ohus, Kristiina ka!" (Our race is endangered, Kristiina too!), referring to her controversial comments that year claiming African refugees to be a "threat to the white race".

== Election results ==
=== Parliamentary elections ===
Election	Votes	%	Seats	+/−	Government
2015	2,289	0.40 (#8)	0 / 101	New	Extra-parliamentary
