= Ojakäär =

Ojakäär is an Estonian surname. Notable people with the surname include:

- Oliver Ojakäär (born 2005), Estonian professional tennis player
- Valter Ojakäär (1923–2016), Estonian composer and music publicist
