= Mauno Meesit =

- Born: Mauno Meesit; August 8, 1983 (age 43); Paide, Estonia
- Genres: Instrumental, minimalist, ambient, film music, electronic
- Instruments: Guitar, waterphone
- Labels: Grainy Records, Accession Records
- Website: maunomeesit.com

Mauno Meesit (born 8 August 1983) is an Estonian musician, composer, record producer, and visual artist.

His albums have been released in Germany and Estonia and have been featured at the Estonian Music Awards. Meesit has composed music for television series, theatre productions, events, and fashion shows.

He has performed at several festivals including Latvian Positivus, Estonian Jazzkaar, Intsikurmu, Üle Heli, Kukemuru Ambient, and has given solo concerts across Europe.

Meesit first gained wider public attention in 2009 with his electronic music project Sinine, with which he has released two albums in Germany on the Accession Records label, namely "Butterflies" (2009) and "Dreams Come True" (2012). Former Estonian president Toomas Hendrik Ilves named Sinine as one of his favorite artists as reported by Eesti Ekspress in 2009. Estonian music critic Mart Juur covered the first album in his book 101 Estonian Pop Music Albums: "This is one of those albums where the release became a spectacle." The second album "Dreams Come True" managed to stay on the German Alternative Charts' first spot for 5 weeks.

After living in Berlin from 2013 to 2015, Meesit released the first album under his own name, Closer, in the spring of 2015. The album introduced a new acoustic direction in his work and was released by his own label Grainy Records that also features other artists, such as V4R1, Viktor's Joy, and The Gentleman Losers. In the same year, Meesit returned to Estonia and composed the music for the TV3 television series Varjudemaa, which was later released as an album on vinyl and CD. In 2017 he scored the Kanal 2 crime-drama series Nukumaja.

Since then, Meesit has focused on concerts, new instrumental music, and his work as a graphic designer. He designed the Estonian Tokyo Olympics 2020 visual campaign and has worked on album cover designs for musicians such as Kreatiivmootor and The Princes, among others.

As a guitarist, he often expands sonic possibilities of his instrument by using freeze and delay pedals and a violin bow in his performances.

== Discography ==
=== Albums ===
- Sinine – Butterflies (2009, Accession Records)
- Sinine – Dreams Come True (2012, Accession Records)
- Mauno Meesit – Closer (2015, Grainy Records)
- Mauno Meesit – Varjudemaa (2015/2016, Grainy Records)

== Music in Television and film ==
- Documentary In Search of Sound (USA 2009)
- TV series Ühikarotid (Kanal 2, 2010, music in episodes)
- TV series Kinotehas (Kanal 2, 2011, music in episodes)
- TV series Romet ja Julia (Kanal 2, 2012, theme song and music in episodes)
- TV advertising music for Invisible Man campaign (2013)
- TV series Varjudemaa (TV3, 2015/2016, original music for 12 episodes and theme song)
- TV series Nukumaja (Kanal 2, 2017, original music for 12 episodes and theme song)
- Estonian Sports Awards Gala (Kanal 2, 2022, composer and musical director)
- TV series Metslased (Eesti Televisioon, 2022, music in episodes)

== Music in Theatre ==
- "Lillede keel" (Von Krahl Theatre, 2012, Rainer Sarnet)
- "The End" (Von Krahl Theatre, 2010)
- "KrabattabarK" (Teatrilabor, 2006, Jaanika Juhanson)

== Music for Events ==
- Estonian Sports Awards Gala (opening music and performance, 2012)
- Tõrva Light Festival (closing performance, with visuals by Alyona Movko, 2018)
- Estonian Sports Awards Gala, 100 Years Jubilee Gala (composer and music director, 2018)
- Tallinn Fashion Week (music for Karin Rask collection, 2018)
- Nõmbra Light Festival "Night Concert" (with coreographer Keithy Kuuspuu, 2021)
- "Sähvatus" (concerts at Padise manor park, 2023)
- Tsitre Valge Öö Light Festival (festival closing performance, 2023)
- TEDx TED (conference) (music signature, 2024)

== Awards and Mentions ==
- 2009 Highlight of the Month – Sonic Seducer (de)
- 2009 Raadio 2 Aastahitt – Demo Artist of The Year
- 2010 Estonian Music Awards – Electronic Artist of The Year nomination
- 2012 German Alternative Charts Nr 1 album for 5 weeks
- 2012 Estonian radios TOP 10 single for 10 weeks
- 2014 Music video of the Year – San Francisco Epidemic Film Festival
- 2022 Kuldmuna Design Awards – Mastery: Illustration nomination
