= Kärt Johanson =

Estonian singer and actor

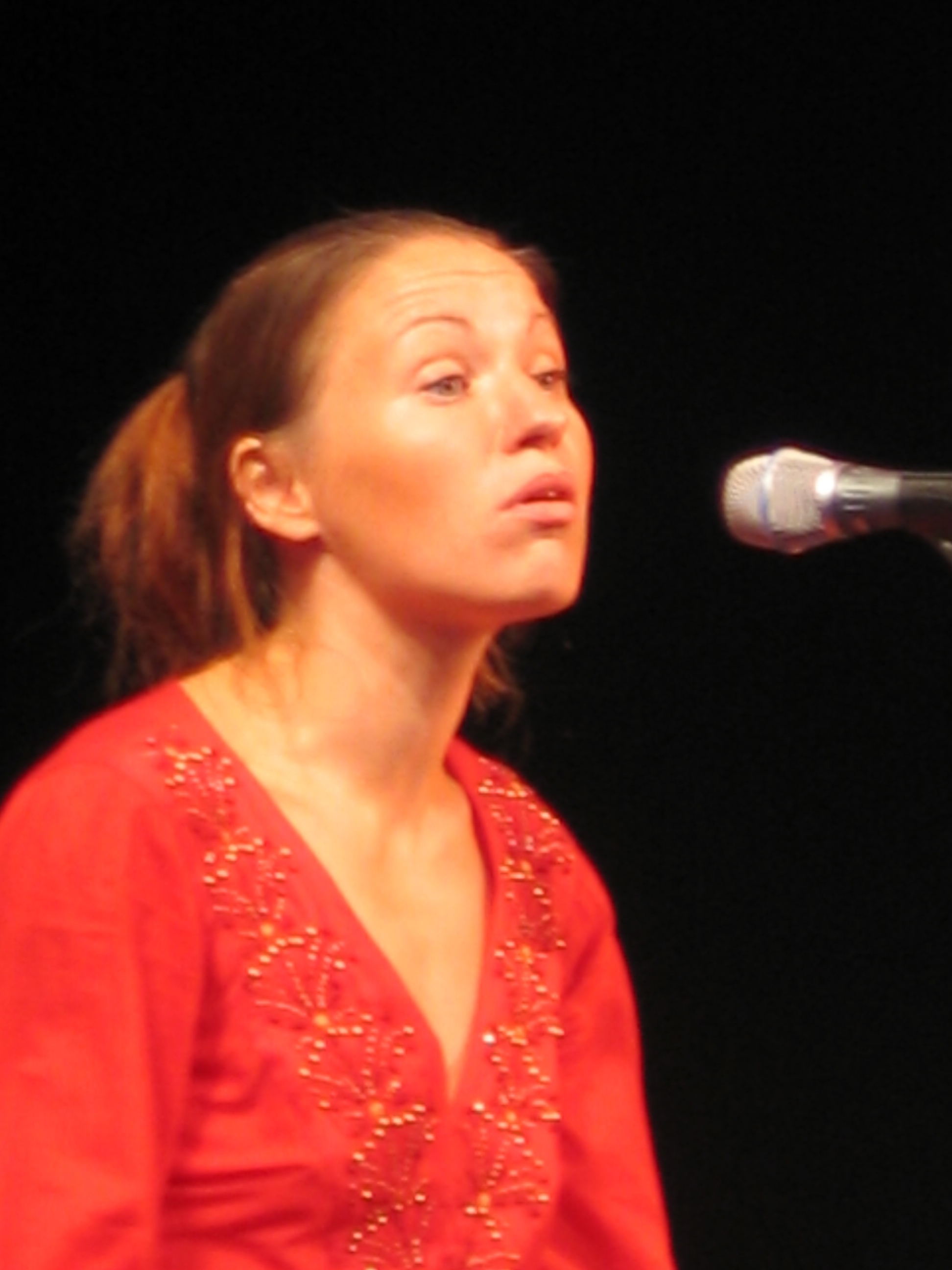
Kärt Johanson

Kärt Johanson (born 8 November 1971) is an Estonian singer and actor.

She was born in Tallinn. In 1997 she graduated from Estonian Institute of Humanities.

She is one of the founder members of the theatre foundation Theatrum (established in 1994).

As a singer, she has been a member of musical group Johanson & Vennad. She has also sung together with Tõnis Mägi.

Since 2001 she is married to singer Tõnis Mägi. The couple have two daughters.

== Discography ==
- Päevakera. Globus Diei, with Johanson (CD and cassette, 2000)
- Seitse une nägu (CD, 2004)
- Unistadt (CD, 2007)
- Külm, koos Johansonidega (CD, 2012)
- Teine ruum, with Tõnis Mägi (CD, 2012)
