= The Princes (Estonian band) =

Estonian musical group

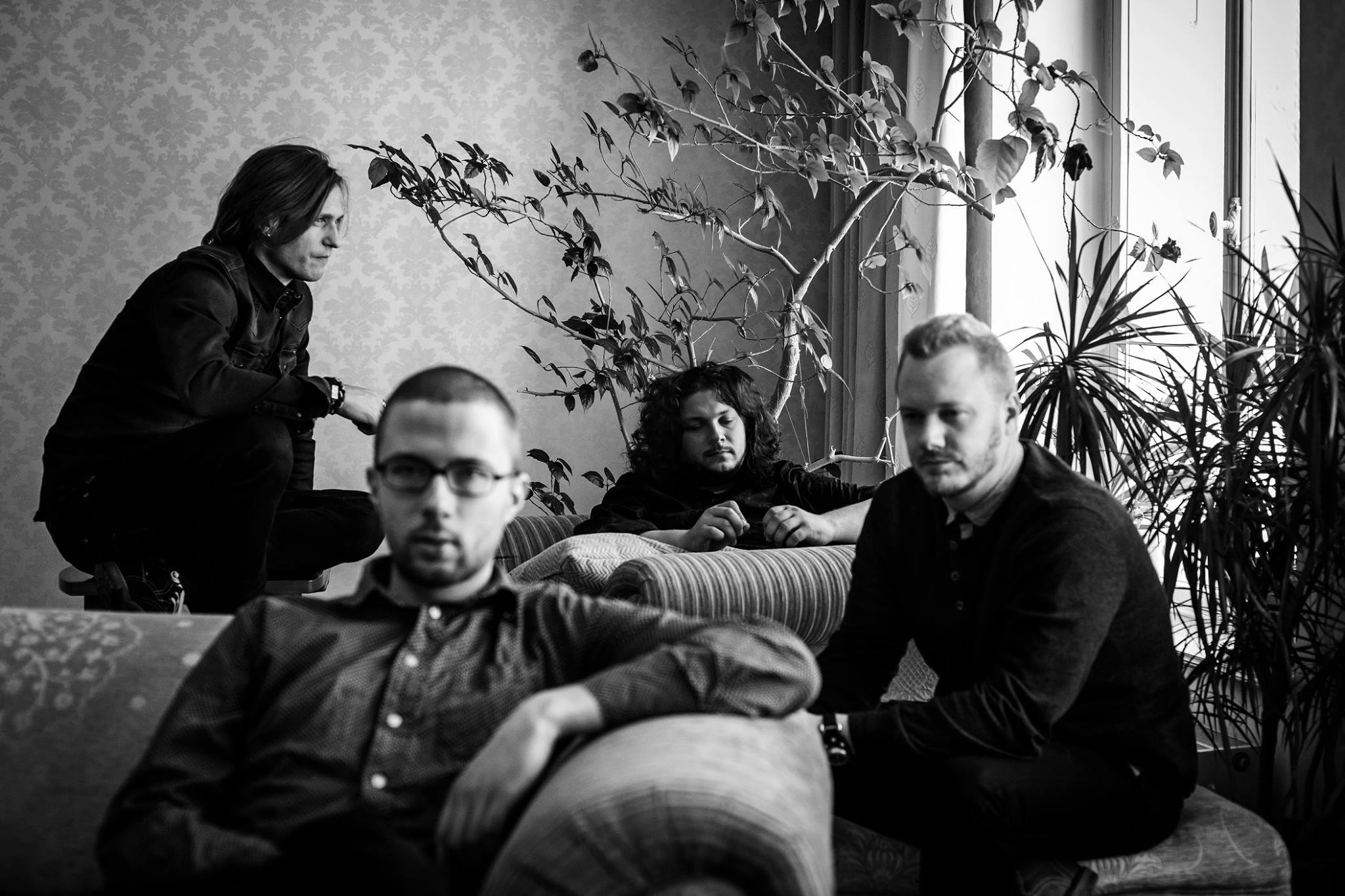
- The Princes in 2015

Background information
- Origin: Tallinn, Estonia
- Genres: Rock, progressive rock, psychedelic rock
- Years active: 2009–present
- Members: Kaur Garšnek; Edward Krimm; Jaagup Tormis; Valdur Viiklepp
- Past members: Taavi Paomets (born 1988); Kostja Tsõbulevski; Madis Viksi
- Website: theprincesband.com

The Princes is an Estonian rock band. The band was formed in 2009 by Edward Krimm (lead vocals, piano, keyboards) and Jaagup Tormis (drums, percussion, vocals), the grandson of one of the greatest living choral composers Veljo Tormis. The current lineup consists of Edward Krimm, Jaagup Tormis, Kaur Garšnek (guitar) and Valdur Viiklepp (bass guitar, vocals). All the members have a musical background and have taken part in other musical groups as well. Most notably, Jaagup Tormis has played in Sinine and Pedigree, Kaur Garšnek (a son of Igor Garšnek, a keyboardist of one of the foremost Estonian rock group Ruja) has played in Kreatiivmootor. Past members of The Princes have included Taavi Paomets, Kostja Tsõbulevski and Madis Viksi.

== Musical style and media coverage of the debut album ==
The Princes' debut album "Stars" was released digitally as well as in CD format towards the end of 2015. According to the progressive rock music portal Progarchives.com, The Princes, being a crossover prog-rock band, "draws inspiration from a multitude of sources and styles, from cabaret, opera and folk music, on one hand, to blues, hard rock and progressive rock, on the other, while the vocals draw inspiration from romantic era choir music".

A major Estonian media outlet, Eesti Päevaleht, described the band's overall style as being very similar to Queen and found the album to be a "strong release".

Estonian Public Broadcasting review also made also the Queen reference and added influences like The Beatles, Pantera, Muse, Stravinsky, Metallica and Farinelli, but deemed the result as being too eclectic, perplexing and incoherent.

Estonian main culture newspaper Sirp reviewed the album and compared the music to Queen, Pink Floyd and Dream Theater, compared Edward Krimm's vocal performances to Freddie Mercury's, and found the album to be a multi-faceted whole, incorporating powerful rock sound, complicated progressive rock structures and "deconstructed boogie", but made a critical comment about the overall sound lacking low end support and high end brilliance.

UK indie music portal Forkster reviewed the album and subsequently nominated The Princes for "Band of The Day", compared it to King Crimson, Dream Theater, David Bowie, Led Zeppelin, Genesis, Yes, and yet, Queen. Forkster: "An avant-garde band that is as effective in whole music diversity as any rock band out there today, 'magnificent rock definition' /.../ Masterpiece music exhibitions of rocketing guitar riff mastery, vivid vocal storm phenoms, spectacular piano key shines alongside 'stunning and running' boom rhythm superbs entirely. It has a sensational volume, character and vibe that 'thrills and chills' with diverse genre act inclusions of classic rock splendour, heavy metal/hard rock thunder, psychedelic rock trips, hip jazz rides and progressive rock dominance foundations."

The photography for the album was done by Heikki Leis and design by Mauno Meesit.

== Live performances and supporting Queen ==
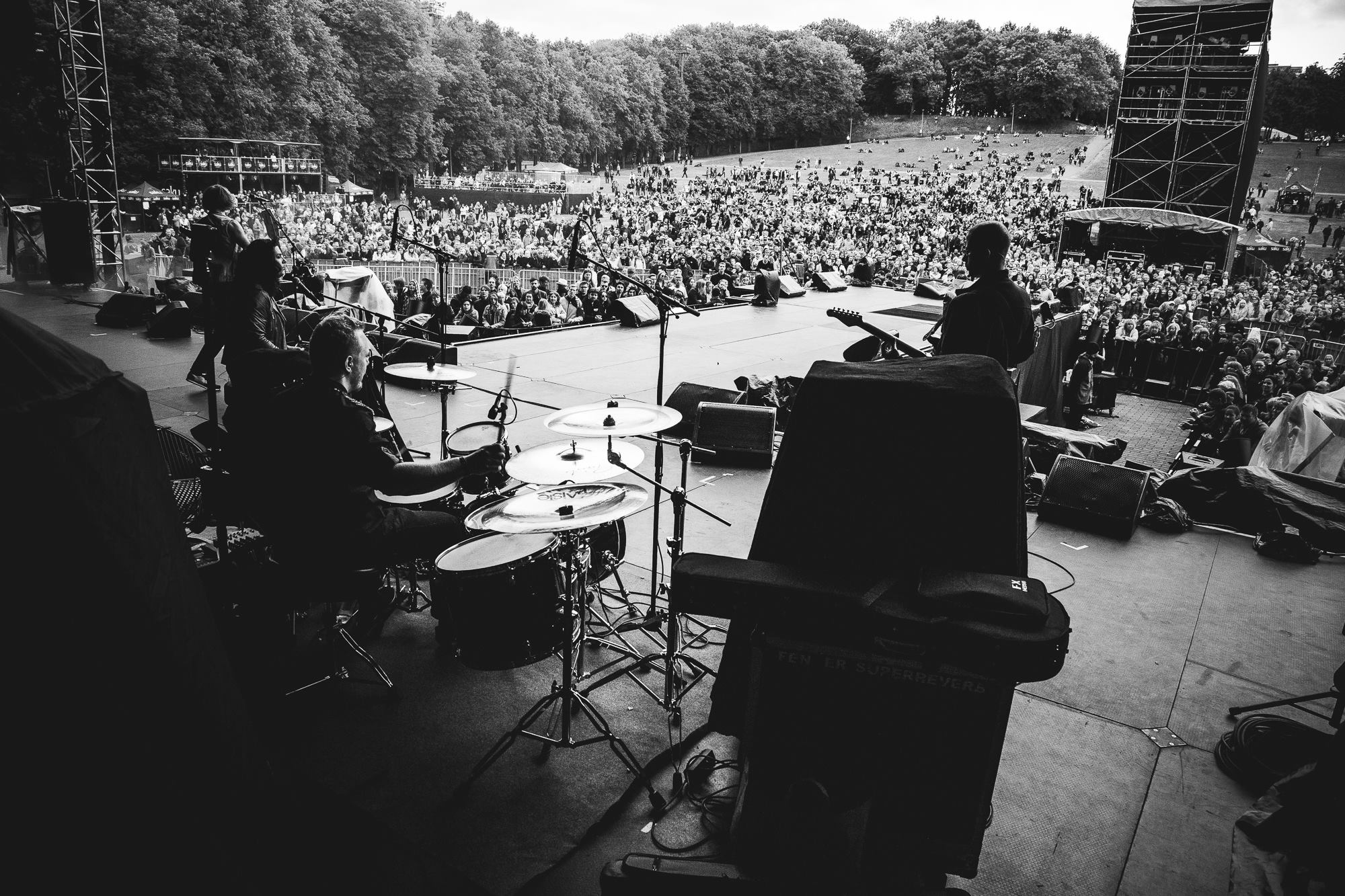
The Princes warming up the crowd for Queen concert in Tallinn

The Princes has shared the stage with bands like Vennaskond from Estonia and Von Hertzen Brothers and Dingo from Finland. They have also shared the stage with artists like Lubomyr Melnyk, Jimi Tenor, Vaiko Eplik and Ultima Thule. The Princes has performed at Tallinn Music Week, one of the biggest Baltic showcase festivals, in 2014 as well as in 2016 and in the latter case was declared Tallinn Music Week's "Artist of The Day" by an Estonian media outlet Postimees.

So far, the band's biggest stage performance has been supporting the legendary rock band Queen on the Queen + Adam Lambert 2016 Summer Festival Tour. On 5 June 2016, The Princes performed as one of the only two warm-up bands for Queen and Adam Lambert concert at Tallinn Song Festival Grounds, Tallinn, Estonia, the other warm-up group being Electric Pyramid from UK. This was the only Queen concert in the Baltic region, the first Queen concert in Estonia, and was attended by tens of thousands of people. Following the event, Eesti Päevaleht described The Princes' approach as "theatrical indie-prog, conceptually not dissimilar to Queen". Internet music magazine Reflections of Darkness covered the concert as well and said The Princes to be "The most promising new band from Estonia /.../ [and] Edward Krimm with his special charisma shines on the stage".

== Discography ==
Singles and EPs

- Birth (2011)
- Out of the Closet (2011)
- Money (2013)
- I Want to Be Famous (2015)
- Ready to Go (2017)
- Polarity (2017)

Studio albums

- Stars (2015)
