= Valter Ojakäär =

Estonian composer and music publicist

Valter Ojakäär (10 March 1923 Pärnu – 27 October 2016 Tallinn) was an Estonian composer, instrumentalist, music publicist and author.

In 1956 he graduated from Tallinn State Conservatory in composition specialty.

1945–1970 he was a concertmaster for Estonian Television and Radio Variety Orchestra's saxophone group. 1964–1967 and 1975–1980 he taught popular music history and orchestration at Tallinn State Conservatory.

Several his songs have been presented at Estonian Song Celebrations.

Ojakäär was a highly respected figure in Estonian music and contributed significantly to the country's cultural landscape. He composed music in various genres, including popular songs, choral works, film and theater music, and instrumental pieces. Valter Ojakäär's compositions often reflected the spirit of his time and remained beloved by generations of Estonians.

One of his most famous works is the song "Ei ole üksi ükski maa" (No Land Is Alone), which has become an iconic piece in Estonian music history. Ojakäär's contribution to Estonian music earned him recognition and numerous awards during his lifetime.

== Selected works ==
- 1957: song "Fisherman Is a Peculiar Man“
- 1962: song "Babtizing"
- 1967: opera "The King Is Cold"
