= Tõnis Mägi =

Estonian singer and composer

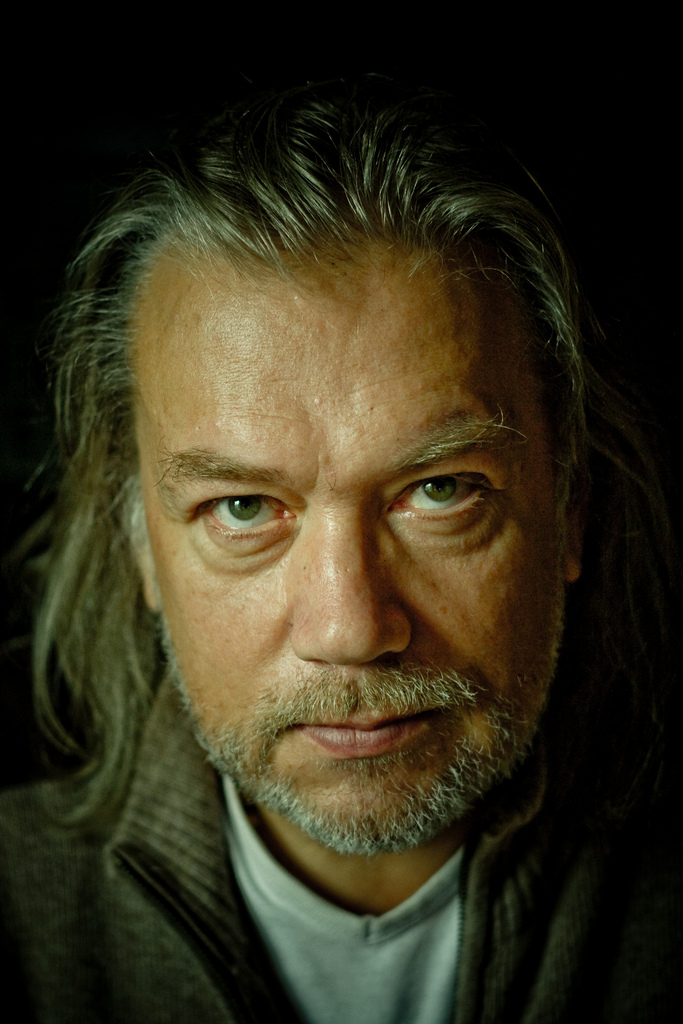
- Tõnis Mägi in 2008
- Born: 18 November 1948 (age 77); Tallinn, then part of Estonian SSR, Soviet Union
- Occupations: Singer, guitarist, composer, actor
- Years active: 1965–present
- Spouse(s): Virve; Laine Mihelson-Adamson (m. 1980; div. 1988); Piia; Kärt Johanson
- Awards
- Musical career
- Genres: Pop; rock; Synth-pop
- Instruments: Vocals; guitar

Tõnis Mägi (born 18 November 1948) is an Estonian singer, guitarist, composer and actor. He is one of the most influential and remarkable names in Estonian rock music of the past 40 years. More recently, he is known for his political activity in support of the right-wing populist and national-conservative Conservative People's Party of Estonia as well as vaccine hesitancy.

== Early life ==
He grew up in a musical family and became interested in music during his early childhood. While attending in the Tallinn 22nd High School (now Jakob Westholm Gymnasium) he started performing as the choir's soloist in the early grades. After learning to play guitar, Mägi started his musician career as a guitarist in school bands Juuniorid (1965) and Rütmikud (1966). After serving in the compulsory Soviet Army he became the vocalist of Baltika. Later he sang in the bands Kärjed, Laine, Muusik Seif, 777 and Ultima Thule.

== Career ==
In the 1970s and 1980s, Mägi gained popularity not only in Estonia, but in the whole Soviet Union. One of his most popular songs Olimpiada-80 (Олимпиада-80) became a symbol of the 1980 Moscow Olympics. In 1987, he gave his last concert in Russia, after which he returned to Estonia and focused on the Singing Revolution. Among other patriotic songs of the time, Mägi's song Koit (Estonian for Dawn) became a symbol of freedom.

Since 1996 he has been working in Vanemuine theatre in Tartu.

== Political activity ==
In January 2007, Mägi became a member of the political party Estonian Greens. He stood as a candidate in the Estonian parliamentary election in 2007, receiving 1215 votes.

Since then Tõnis Mägi has communicated skeptical sentiments around the European Union and its interpretations of what's allowable. He has also expressed support towards the right-wing populist national-conservative Conservative People's Party of Estonia.

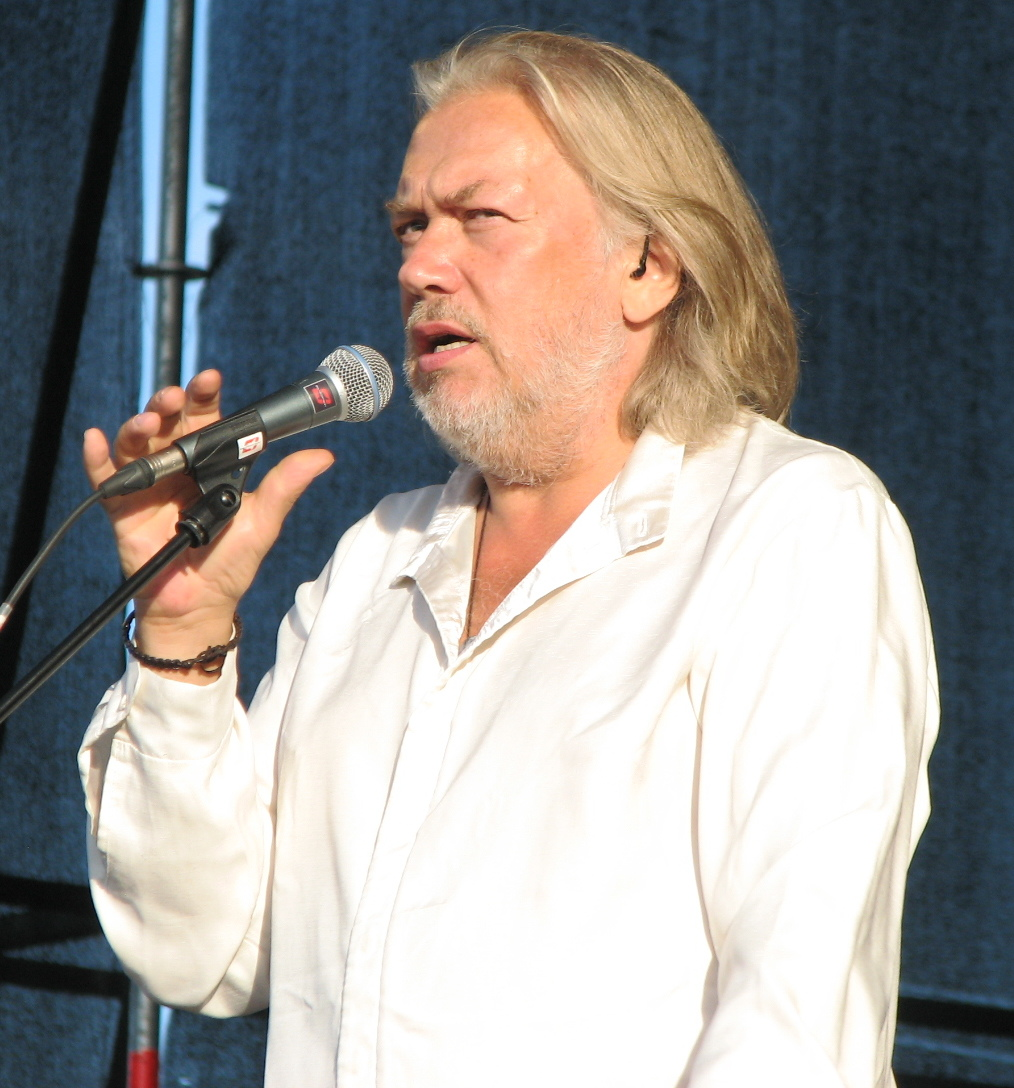
Mägi in 2011

He performed at a concert following the Independence Day torch-march, which was organized by the conservative youth formation of the Conservative People's Party of Estonia called Blue Awakening. He also called for electing a member of the Conservative People's Party of Estonia Henn Põlluaas at the presidential elections of 2021.

On April 22, 2017, Tõnis Mägi opposed the Rail Baltic rail line connecting the Baltic States to the rest of the European rail transit system.

On October 23, 2021, Tõnis Mägi performed on Freedom Square in Tallinn during a demonstration against COVID-19 measures. On a video broadcast prior to that, he called for participation on the demonstration, quoting Leelo Tungal poetry, which the author disapproved of. He has also received criticism due to his messaging around vaccine-skepticism. Tõnis Mägi was planning to attend the spring demonstration as well, but he was unable to attend.

== Decorations ==
In 1999, the President of Estonia decorated Tõnis Mägi with a IV Class Order of the White Star and in 2010 with the III Class Order of the National Coat of Arms.

== Personal ==
Tõnis Mägi met his first wife, Virve, while still a student. In 1980, he married actress and dancer Laine Mihelson-Adamson with whom he has a daughter, Liis-Katrin (born 1983). The couple divorced in 1988. In the same year he met his third wife, Piia, with whom he soon emigrated to Sweden. After her death, Mägi had to raise their daughter, Maarja (born 1992), by himself. Currently, Tõnis Mägi is married to singer Kärt Johanson. They have two daughters: Liidia (born 1999) and Mirt (born 2004). Mägi's daughter from his second marriage, Liis-Katrin, is married to actor Märt Avandi.

== Discography ==
- 1980 Олимпиада-80
- Детектив
- Я не умею танцевать
- Любимый мой дворик
- Вот возьму и уеду
- Секундомер
- Меняю
- Сердце не спит
- 1981 Tōnis Mägi & «Muusik Seif»
- 1983 Mäe Kaks Nōlva'
- 1990 Tõnis LP, ZEN 2019 Rockadillo Records
- 1993 Hüüdja hääl CD, Trio
- 1995 Liivakell CD, SaluMuusik Rec
- 1996 Las jääda kõik, mis hea 1 CD, ERC008 Eesti Raadio: Jaak Joala, Ivo Linna
- 1996 Las jääda kõik, mis hea 2 CD, ERC009 Eesti Raadio: Jaak Joala, Ivo Linna
- 1998 Kaunilt kaua CD, Tõnis Mägi
- 2000 Eesti Kullafond 2CD, HFCD024 Hitivabrik
- 2002 Pühendus DVD, Digibox OÜ
- 2003 Jäljed CD, ARM Music
- 2003 Siirius CD, ARM Music
- 2005 Vestlus Hermanniga CD, T. Mägi
- 2006 2teist CD, Sanofi Aventis
- 2008 KIIK & KIRIK CD, T. Mägi ja Politseiorkester
- 2011 Tarkus CD, Elwood Muusik OÜ
