= Kalle Vilpuu =

Estonian guitarist and songwriter (born 1963)

- Born: Kalle Vilpuu; 24 July 1963 (age 62); Kohtla-Järve, then part of Estonian SSR, Soviet Union
- Genres: Jazz, Progressive rock, Rock
- Instrument: Guitar
- Years active: 1980s–present
- Formerly of: Ultima Thule, Seitsmes meel, House Of Games
- Website: kallevilpuu.com

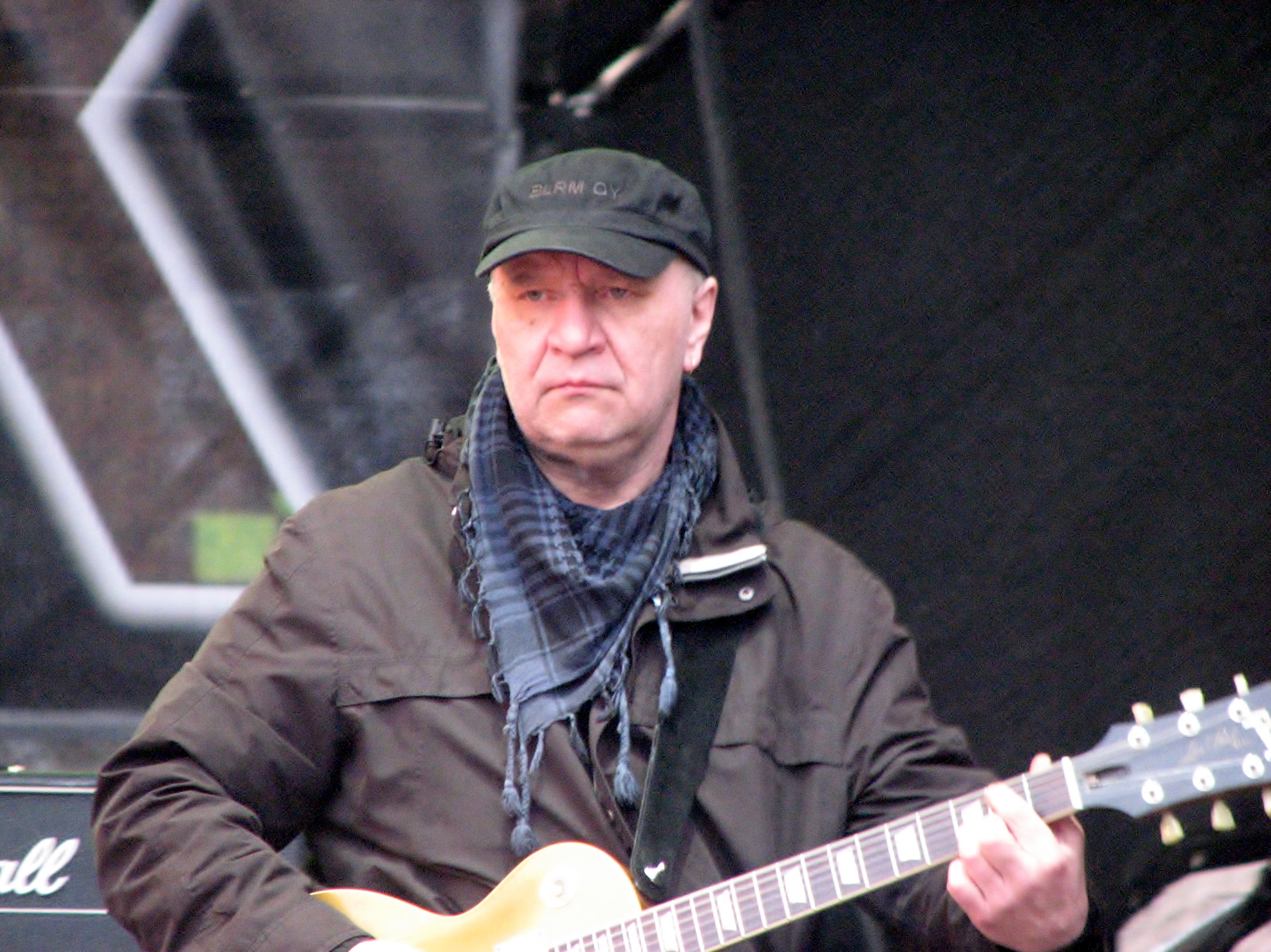
Kalle Vilpuu in 2013

Kalle Vilpuu (born 24 July 1963) is an Estonian guitarist and songwriter. Vilpuu is best known as the guitarist for Estonian rock band Ultima Thule. He also has played guitar for Estonian bands House Of Games and Seitsmes Meel. Vilpuu released his debut solo album Silver Lining in 2013. This album consists of 11 instrumental tracks, including the core rhythm section of Andrus Lillepea (drums) and Henno Kelp (bass). Hard rock, jazz-rock and a spacier type of 21st century progressive/soundtrack music merges on Kalle Vilpuu's Silver Lining. In 2015, Dutch radio station T-on-Air selected Silver Lining as album of the year.

== Discography ==
- Silver Lining (2013, CD) Guitar Laborotory

== Videos ==
- Kalle Vilpuu "In the Back of My Head" on YouTube
