= Juss Haasma =

Estonian actor and musician (born 1985)

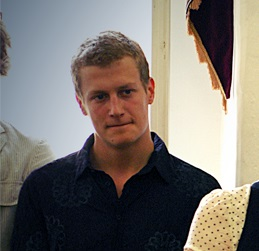
- Born: 23 August 1985 (age 40); Tallinn, then part of Estonian SSR, Soviet Union
- Occupations: Actor, musician
- Years active: 2006 – present
- Children: 2

Juss Haasma (born 23 August 1985) is an Estonian stage, film and television actor and musician.

== Early life and education ==
Juss Haasma was born and raised in Tallinn. His father, Arne Haasma, is an accordionist and singer with the ensemble Kukerpillid. He has three siblings and one half-sister. He attended Tallinn Old Town Educational College (VHK) and is a 2008 graduate of the Estonian Academy of Music and Theatre.

== Career ==
=== Stage ===
In 2008, following his graduation from the Estonian Academy of Music and Theatre, Haasma began an engagement at the Ugala theatre in Viljandi. He would remain with the Ugala for a year, departing in 2009 to become a freelance actor. He has performed in roles at the Theatre NO99 in Tallinn and the Tartu New Theatre. One of his more memorable stage roles at the Tartu New Theatre was in 2011 in a production of Raudmees. Odysseuse eksirännakud, in which he portrayed Estonian rock singer and musician Gunnar Graps. In 2012, he appeared onstage as an actor and singer in the role of Aadu in the children's play Kosmonaut Lotte at the Vanemuine theatre in Tartu. Kosmonaut Lotte was another adventure of the popular Lotte character who initially became popular in Estonia as an animated film character.

=== Television ===
In 2006, Haasma made his television debut as Marko in an episode of the Kanal 2 crime-drama series Kelgukoerad. This was followed by a 2007 appearance as the character Ülo in an episode of the Eesti Televisioon (ETV) crime-drama series Ohtlik lend. In 2010, he appeared in the role of Peeter on an episode of the popular Kanal 2 drama series Pilvede all. Haasma is possibly best recalled through his television appearances, however, as a regular cast member on the TV3 comedy-crime series Kättemaksukontor, in which he played the role of Rainis Sõber in over eighty episodes from 2013 until 2018.

In 2015, Haasma was a contestant and ultimate winner on TV3's Su nägu kõlab tuttavalt, the Estonian version of Your Face Sounds Familiar, an interactive reality television franchise series where celebrity contestants impersonate singers. Haasma's impersonations included Macy Gray, Jan Uuspõld of the Luxury Filters, Amy Winehouse, Kiesza, Helend Peep, Bruno Mars, and Angus Young of AC/DC, among others. In 2016, he competed on the Kanal 2 series Suur Komöödiaõhtu, in which several Estonian celebrities compete in a variety of weekly comedic challenges. Haasma placed third in the contest at the series' end.

=== Film ===
Juss Haasma made his feature-film screen debut in a small role in 2007 as an Estonian Army soldier in the Andres Maimik and Rain Tolk directed road movie comedy Jan Uuspõld läheb Tartusse; a film that portrays Estonian actor and singer Jan Uuspõld as a down-on-his-luck caricature of himself trying to hitchhike from Tallinn to Tartu to perform in a role at the Vanemuine theatre. The following year, he appeared in another small role in the Liina Paakspuu directed drama Soovide puu. In 2012, he played the character Otto in the Ain Mäeots directed drama Deemonid; which focuses on the downward spiral of three individuals who enter a casino. In 2021, he appeared in the Priit Pääsuke directed comedy-drama Öölapsed.

Haasma's most substantial film role to date was the role of Mattias in the 2016 Triin Ruumet directed tragicomedy Päevad, mis ajasid segadusse, for Kinosaurus Film. He has also appeared in several film shorts.

=== Music ===
Haasma is the singer and guitarist for the Estonian rock band Trikster.

== Personal life ==
Juss Haasma had been in a long-term relationship with partner Ann Vilgats for many years. The couple have two daughters and resided in Tallinn. They later separated in 2017.
