= Kreatiivmootor =

Estonian band

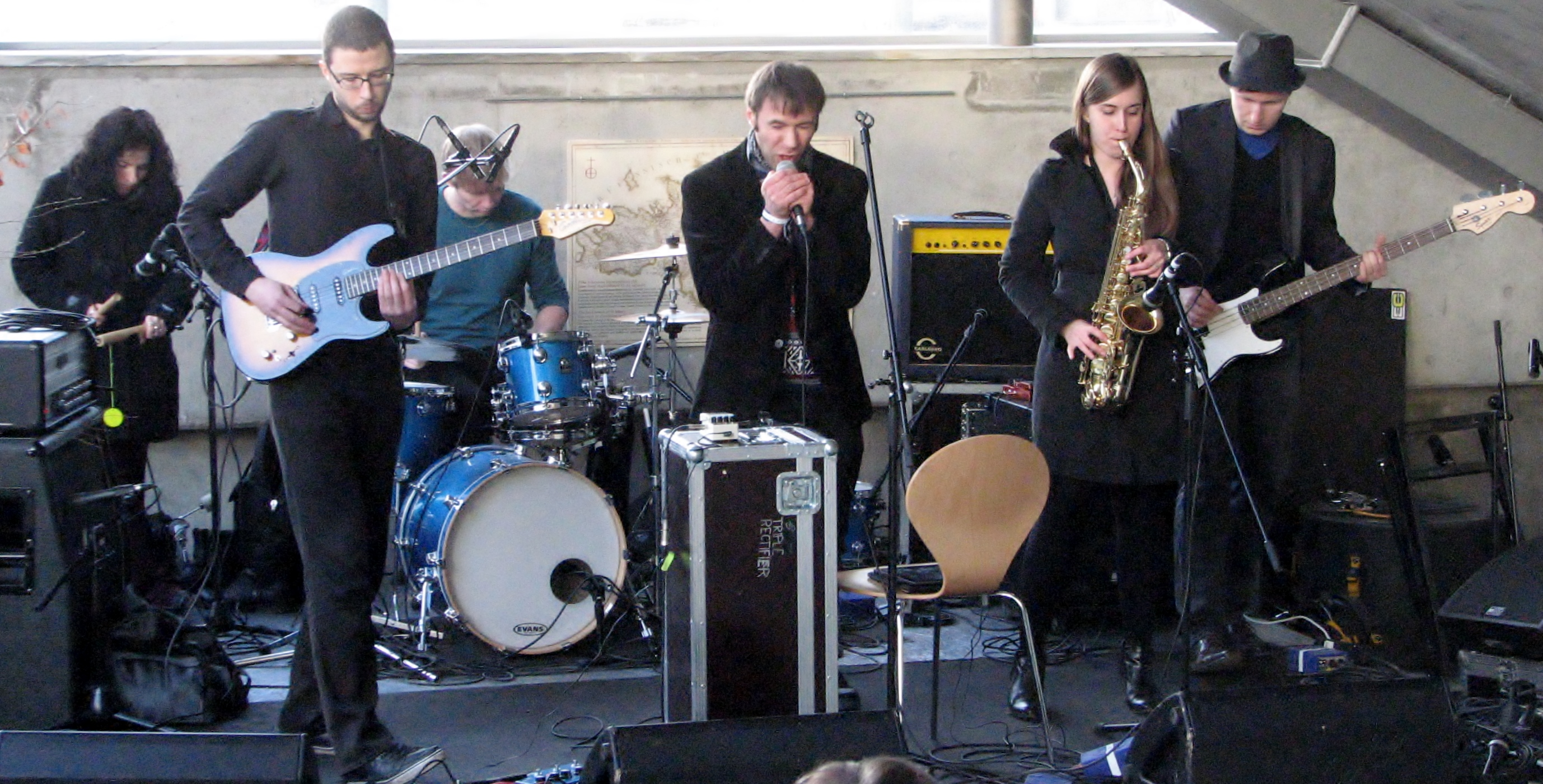

Background information
- Origin: Tallinn
- Years active: 2003-present
- Label: Odessa Records
- Members: Ingrid Aimla; Roomet Jakapi; Maria Lepik; Madis Paalo; Allan Plekksepp; Alvin Raat; Kaur Garšnek
- Past members: Olavi Jaggo; Liisa-Lotte Käärd; Harri Altroff; Eerik Hanni

Kreatiivmootor is an Estonian band, brought into existence in 2003 by an academic philosopher Roomet Jakapi, PhD, and a lawyer Allan Plekksepp, PhD, who had intended to make music without genre or scene constraints. Their alternative style has ranged from eccentric experimentalism to psychedelic pop. After expanding to become an octet in 2008, the band has used computer programmes, live electronics, guitars, bass, sax, percussion and drums in their live performances. Apart from releasing three albums and standing up at Tallinn Music Week, they have also performed at other festivals, such as Waves Vienna, Positivus in Latvia, Brainlove Festival of Brainlove Records in the UK and Sergey Kuryokhin International Festival in Russia.

After establishing the group, the founding members Roomet Jakapi (vocals, lyrics) and Allan Plekksepp (guitar, bass guitar, programming) were soon joined by Liisa-Lotte Käärd (percussion), Eerik Hanni (programming, video), Harri Altroff (keyboards) and Olavi Jaggo (drums). After some personnel change, the second wave additions in 2008 included Ingrid Aimla (percussion), Kaur Garšnek (guitar, programming), Maria Lepik (alto saxophone) and Madis Paalo (drums). Several band members have been partaking in separate musical acts beside Kreatiivmootor, e.g., Roomet Jakapi in Punkt Nihu, AtgRuioFallA and Impromachine4000, Madis Paalo in Honey Power, Maria Lepik and Ingrid Aimla in Popsid, Alvin Raat in La Rabbia and Maikameikers, Kaur Garšnek in The Princes.

== "Irratsionaalne" (2007) release and performances ==
Kreatiivmootor's early recordings, published on two demo CD-Rs in 2005, received considerable attention from local music critics and radio DJs. A track called “Irratsionaalne”, featuring ecstatic jabbering of the singer Roomet, became a kind of underground hit in Estonia. In 2006, Erkki Luuk from an Estonian media outlet Eesti Ekspress reviewed these self-released eponymous demo albums, drew parallels with Frank Zappa and Captain Beefheart, found the music to be at the same time "hilarious and scary", pointed out the deliberate use of aleatoric techniques and randomness and found them to be important releases in regard to "cultural self-reflection", although somewhat questionable musically.

Years later, in 2011, the abovementioned song, "Irratsionaalne", was chosen by Estonian Ministry of Culture to be on the compilation “Estonian Music Now 2011”, released by Red Orange and distributed with The Wire magazine. (Other musical contributions on this release included, e.g., classical composer Peeter Vähi and guitarist Robert Jürjendal with his bands UMA and Weekend Guitar Trio.)

The first official album of Kreatiivmootor, also called “Irratsionaalne” (since it contained the same song alongside several other compositions from the original demo recordings), was released by a small Estonian label Odessa Records in 2007. Critics approved the album for its eccentric experimentalism and used various catchy labels such as “dada pop” and “weird shit” to describe it. Tiit Kusnets from an Estonian media outlet Postimees reviewed the debut and classified it under such diverse genre labels as electropop, blues, punk rock, bossa, ambient, alternative pop, microhouse and stoner rock and said it to be one of the most "credible jokes" in Estonian pop music.

== "Kaleidoskoop" (2010) release and performances ==
The second album “Kaleidoskoop” was issued in 2010. Mart Kuldkepp from Eesti Ekspress reviewed it and pointed to the grandiose vocal experiments and monotonous, naivist backgrounds consistent with the previous release, but ultimately summed up the release as a departure from the syrrealist, anarchist, unconventional and unashamedly unprofessional approach of the debut and as saw it a halfway towards becoming "a real band" and making music in conventional sense. "Kreatiivmootor could be the best Finno-Ugric horror band, if their music, beside being weird and scary, wasn't also very childish and superficial," said Kuldkepp. At the same time, Kuldkepp also drew attention to a very wide genre spectrum incorporating everything from pop songs, blues rock and industrial music to schlager.

"Kaleidoskoop" was presented in 2010 at Tallinn Music Week festival. Tauno Maarpuu from the Estonian cultural newspaper Sirp gave a not-so-mixed review and described the concert in following words: "/.../ [G]enre defying Kreatiivmootor, led by the charismatic vocalist Roomet Jakapi, left a surprisingly professional impression, especially considering their so-called homespun dada-past. Experienced musicians who had joined the band after the release of the debut album in 2007 alongside the core members /.../ made the crowd cheer with enthusiasm."

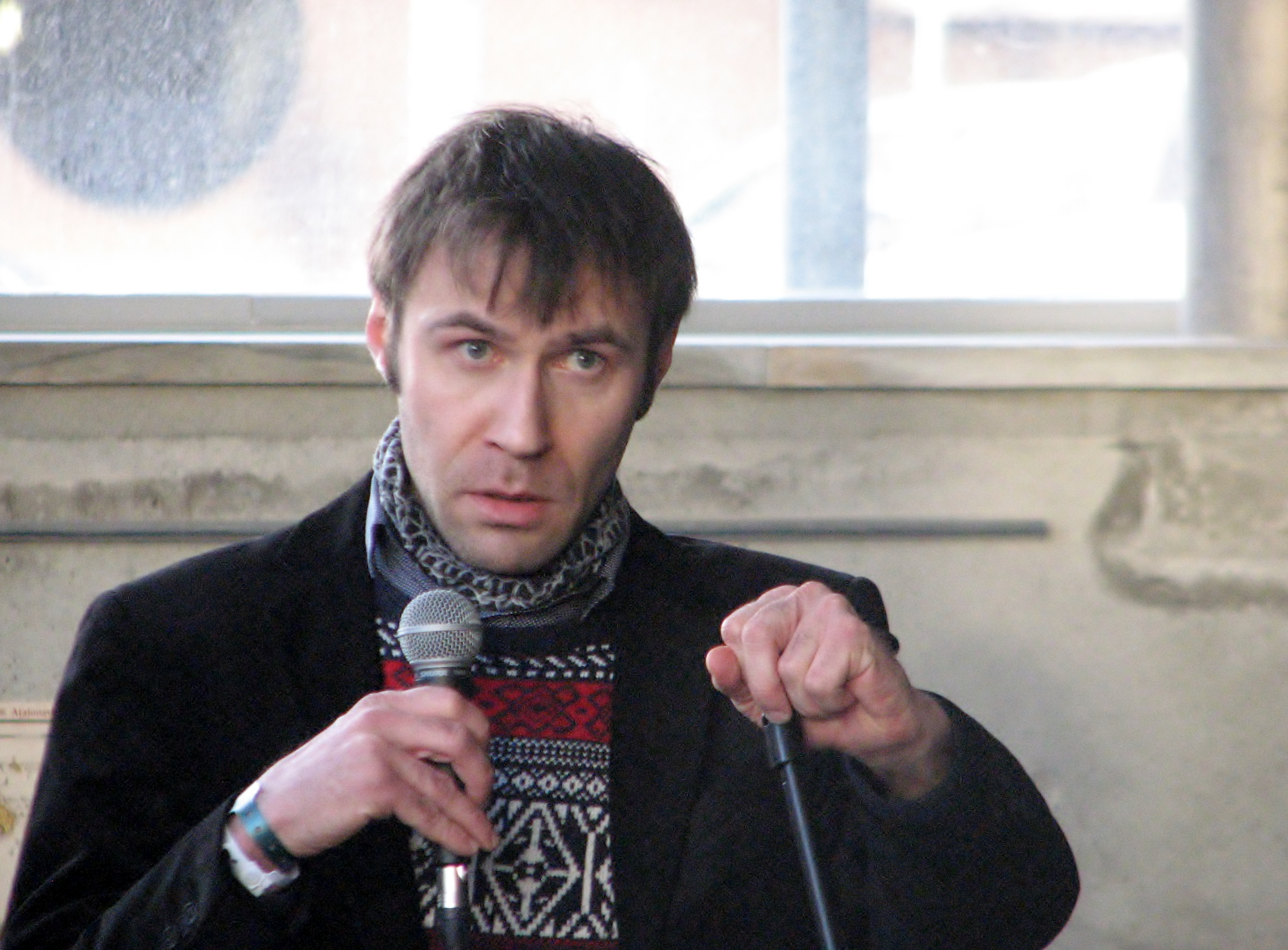
Roomet Jakapi performing with Kreatiivmootor at Tallinn Music Week

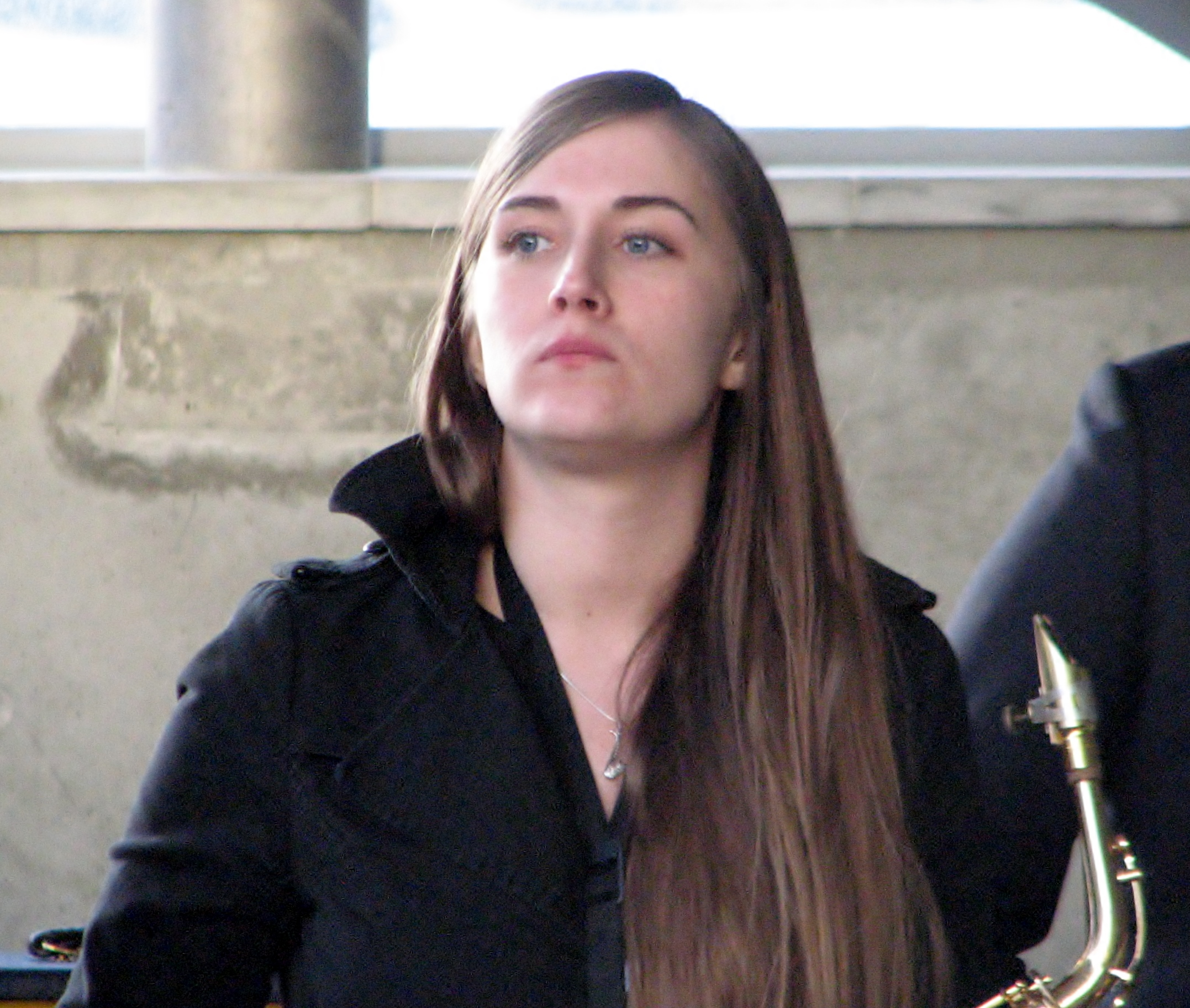
Maria Lepik performing with Kreatiivmootor at Tallinn Music Week (2014)

== "Algne sülg esitab" (2016) release and performances ==
The material of the third album "Algne sülg esitab" was performed and developed first during live shows beginning in 2011 and released five years later. In 2011, Tallinn was designated to be a European Capital of Culture, which brought a lot of attention to Estonian artists, Kreatiivmootor being one of them. The band made an impression on some of the foreign delegates attending Tallinn Music Week festival. What followed was a series of concerts in European capitals.

Luke Slater from the UK-based music webzine Drowned In Sound wrote about the seminal concert: "The highlight of the Odessa Pop night — and as it later turns out the entire event – were Kreatiivmootor. The Estonian language utilises an awful lot of double vowels and naturally strikes a great deal of fear into the mind and mouths, should you get that far, of any foreigner trying their hand at being an adaptable and cosmopolitan member of the human race/European Union. Still, the aforementioned vowels really do emphasise the essential, well, for want of a better word, creativity in this jam-troupe (for extreme yearning for an alternative turn of phrase). Listening to them on record, although still retaining a sense and essence of their tangential and avant-garde wonkiness, won't come close to their live presence. Fronted by a man who we are told is a philosophy professor is telling. /.../ All of the philosophy professors I knew of at university were several chapters short of a treatise and Kreatiivmootor's approach does not betray this whatsoever with one extended session of beats, yelps, and bit-by-bit building blowing away the thought of my very existence out of my headspace. It's hard not to move your feet, as I do, even in the lamest manner, but Roomet Jakapi is a distracting man too, weaving in and around his bandmates, whose individual performances are also mesmerising, especially percussively — actions which draw more than the odd wave of arm from an encapsulated audience. Of course there is structure, but like all good improvised music, it seems a distant thought. What isn't a distant thought, though, are any questions about the abundant intensity and quality of Kreatiivmootor. Mind. Blown."

In June 2011, Kreatiivmootor performed at Brainlove Festival of Brainlove Records, London. Webzine The Line Of Best Fit described the performance as a "/.../ frenzied, pulsing art-kraut-jazz-techno-improv of Estonian ensemble."

In September 2011, in regards to the performance at Popkomm festival, Berlin, Kreatiivmootor was introduced: "Originally a duo sporting weird lo-fi dada-pop of a kind that no one had ever heard before, Kreatiivmootor have by now expanded into a small orchestra, with music more diverse and polished – hypnotic electronic grooves enriched with psychedelic acoustic sounds, instrumental and vocal improvisation. Their expressive nature is best revealed in live performances which, more often than not, threaten to turn into a kind of Witch's Sabbath or Bacchanalia."

In October 2011, Kreatiivmootor gave two concerts at Iceland Airwaves festival, Reykjavík (one of them at Harpa concert hall). John Rogers wrote in Iceland Airwaves' webzine, "The best is saved till last. From Tallinn, Estonia, Kreatiivmootor are a band like no other. Their shrieking, babbling shaman of a frontman Roomet Jakapi (also a professor of philosophy) utterly smashes speech and language through his pedal array, uttering a crazed lexicon of sounds and syllables in a hyper-communicative language all of his own. The five-piece band smash music around him accordingly, breaking it down into beeping, drilling, oscillating sonic non-sequitors that grapple and flail in a compulsively weird whirlwind before congealing into a pounding, danceable racket. Half the audience giggle in stunned confusion, the other half rapt, rolling in the shards of sound, sweating and grinning at these joyful, brilliant lunatics who’ve taken over the asylum. This kind of brazen invention is a far cry from the woefully insipid opening act – Kreatiivmootor are the stuff legendary Airwaves performances are made of."

In October 2011, Kreatiivmootor also performed at Waves Vienna, Vienna. Robin Murray from Clash magazine wrote: "/.../ [A] great sonic onslaught of beats and attitude, like a Baltic version of the Lo Fidelity Allstars."

Following year, Kreatiivmootor performed at Tallinn Music Week 2012. Amy Liptrot from Clash magazine described Kreatiivmootor's performance in these words: “/.../ [T]he astounding, perplexing Kreatiivmootor, whose constantly-moving frontman is like a glamorous toddler singing in an invented language, a rock ‘n’ roll tongues.”

In 2013, Kreatiivmootor performed at Club Radio Free Europe concert, London. The Vinyl District webzine gave an overview: "/.../ The club brought together the eclectric, [sic] absurd, glam and gothic in the form of Kreatiivmootor, an electro-funk dada-ist experimental happening."

In 2016, after a long period of post production and editing, the material which originated and had developed from the improvisational performances of 2011 and 2012 was finally released under the title "Algne sülg esitab" (in English: "Primary Saliva Presents") and distributed as a digital release as well as in compact cassette format. It took another sharp turn from the previous releases and offered a 7-part quasi-improvisational suite in experimental industrial and quirky noise rock vein. Instrumental performances followed a pre-programmed, but variable sequence of beats, glitches and harmonic themes. The original raw material was recorded in 2012 in Tallinn during a radio concert "Areaal LIVE" on Klassikaraadio, Estonian Public Broadcasting. Siim Nestor from Eesti Ekspress reviewed the album, viewed it through a makeshift genre label for uncategorizable music, "weird shit", and summed it up in words, "Weird shit dinner parties are finally possible." The album was also reviewed in other Estonian media outlets.

== "Mentalbau" (2019) release ==
The fourth album "Mentalbau" was released digitally on November 7, 2019 (with double vinyl release still pending). It features about 1 hour of new original music with guest performances from Estonian musicians Robert Jürjendal and Anne Aavik in addition to remixes from electronic music artists such as ekke, Kiwa, Forgotten Sunrise and Galaktlan. It features artwork by Juss Piho and design by Mauno Meesit.

Within a month, the double album received numerous airplays on Estonian Public Broadcasting radio programs as well as on Latvian Latvijas Radio NABA and Austrian radio FM4. It was also covered in smaller independent music blogs such as Acid Ted, Last Day Deaf and The Playground. The album received favorable reviews from Estonian news outlets Eesti Ekspress, Postimees and Müürileht. At the end of 2019, Kreatiivmootor's album arrived at the 5th place of Estonian Public Broadcasting's Top 50, being preceded by artists such as FKA Twigs, Nick Cave & The Bad Seeds, Kim Gordon and Michael Kiwanuka.

The album was financed via the Estonian crowdfunding vehicle Hooandja with additional support from Estonian Cultural Endowment and Estonian Performers' Association.

== Discography ==
Studio albums

Irratsionaalne (Odessa Records, 2007)

Kaleidoskoop (Kreatiivmootor, 2010)

Algne sülg esitab (Kreatiivmootor, 2016)

Mentalbau (Kreatiivmootor, 2019)
