= Koit (song) =

Estonian protest song by Tõnis Mägi

Song by Tõnis Mägi
- Language: Estonian
- English title: Dawn
- Genre: Rock, protest song
- Lyricist: Tõnis Mägi

Koit (Estonian: "Dawn") is a song by Tõnis Mägi, written in September 1988 and made popular during the Estonian Singing Revolution. It is often seen as Mägi's signature song.

The song is a protest song, promoting the aims of Estonians looking to secede from the Soviet Union. The lyric is quite allusive, with references to a "new dawn" breaking. The final lines, however, make Mägi's point explicit, as he sings (in translation):

Land, land of my fathers, so sacred a land Which must now be free Our song, our song of freedom will sound And you will see a free Estonia.

The song is frequently performed at the Estonian Laulupidu and other patriotic events.
