= Tbilisi Rock Festival (1980) =

- Genre: Rock music
- Dates: March 8 to March 16, 1980
- Locations: Tbilisi, Georgian SSR, Soviet Union
- Founders: Georgian National Philharmonic Hall, the Union of Composers of the Georgian SSR, the Republican Center for Youth Culture

Spring Rhythms: Tbilisi-80 (Russian: Весенние ритмы. Тбилиси-80, Vesennye ritmy. Tbilisi-80) was a musical event held in Tbilisi, capital of the Georgian SSR, Soviet Union, from March 8 to March 16, 1980. It was the first official rock festival in the Soviet Union and is frequently considered the turning point in the history of Soviet and Russian rock music.

== Organization ==
The festival was organized by the Georgian National Philharmonic Hall, the Union of Composers of the Georgian SSR, and the Republican Center for Youth Culture at the Georgian Komsomol Central Committee. The acclaimed Russian musicologist and the first Soviet rock-critic Artemy Troitsky was also heavily involved in organizing the event. The organizers enjoyed the support of Eduard Shevardnadze, the contemporary First Secretary of Georgian Communist Party, who is said to have sought, in this way, to pacify the Georgian youth increasingly involved in nationalist and dissident activities after the April 1978 demonstrations in Tbilisi, and to nurture his image as a liberal leader.

Although dubbed by some as a "Soviet Woodstock", the festival was essentially a state-sanctioned musical competition with the declared aim "to promote the development of original Soviet VIA music... and to discover new talented performers and composers." The jury, formed by the officially established Soviet composers and musicologists, was chaired by Yuri Saulsky and included Murad Kazhlayev, Giya Kancheli, Konstantin Pevzner, Vladimir Rubashevsky, Arkadi Petrov, and others. Many suspected that the festival was an attempt by the Soviet establishment to channel the Soviet rock movement into a controllable ideological vessel. However, the event was truly democratic in that it allowed amateur performers to contest on equal terms with professional musicians. Over twenty groups from seventeen cities of the Soviet Union arrived in Tbilisi to take part in the event. Yet, several notable bands, for example Sergei Rudnitsky's Araks and Aleksey Romanov’s Voskresenie were not invited to take part in the competition.

== Prize winners ==
The first prize was awarded to two acts: Gunnar Graps's Magnetic Band and Mashina Vremeni. Magnetic Band, a group from Tallinn, Estonia, performed a mixture of jazz-rock, blues and funk and was noted for their instrumental mastership. Mashina Vremeni is a rock band from Moscow and led by Andrey Makarevich, which fascinated the public with their poetic lyrics and, through this success, firmly established themselves on the Soviet rock scene.

The second prize was won by Alexander Sitkovetsky’s art rock group Autograph from Moscow, Gunesh from Ashkhabad, Turkmen SSR, playing jazz-rock based on Turkmen folk melodies, and Labyrinth from Batumi, Adjar ASSR, Georgia, which performed a half-hour composition marrying folk-rock with traditional Georgian choral music.

The professional Georgian soft-rock band VIA-75 led by Robert Bardzimashvili, to the surprise of many, received only the third prize which they shared with Dialog led by the organist Kim Breitburg from Donetsk, Ukrainian SSR, the eclectic band Integral from Saratov, Russian SFSR, and Tip-Top from Riga, Latvian SSR, whose success was largely indebted to the singer Harald Simanis.

A popular Georgian beat-band Blitz led by Valery Kocharov was awarded a special prize of the audience.

The compilation of the award-winning songs was released as a 2 LP Laureaty festivalya "Vesenniye ritmy, Tbilisi-80" (Russian: Лауреаты фестиваля «Весенние ритмы, Тбилиси-80», lit. 'Laureates of the Festival Spring Rhythms Tbilisi-80') by the Soviet state-run record label Melodiya in 1981.

=== The prize-winning songs ===
1. "Khrustalny gorod" (Russian: «Хрустальный город»), Mashina Vremeni (music and lyrics by Andrey Makarevich)
2. "Sneg" (Russian: «Снег»), Mashina Vremeni (music and lyrics by Andrey Makarevich)
3. "Irlandia. Ulster" (Russian: «Ирландия. Ольстер»), Autograph (A. Sitkovetsky – M. Pushkina)
4. "Sakartvelo" (Russian: «Сакартвело»), Labyrinth (M. Kiladze)
5. "Pristegnite remni bezopasnosti" (Russian: «Пристегните ремни безопасности»), Autograph (A. Sitkovetsky)
6. "Caprice Blues" (Russian: «Каприз, Блюз»), Autograph (A. Sitkovetsky)
7. "Stranniy mir" (Russian: «Странный мир»), Integral (Ch. Nemen – V. Lugovoi)
8. "Suliko" (Russian: «Сулико»), Integral (Georgian folk song)
9. "Lady blues" (Russian: «Леди блюз»), Magnetic Band (music and lyrics by Gunnar Graps)
10. "Rodina" (Russian: «Родина»), VIA-75 (Georgian folk melody; lyrics by Akaki Tsereteli; arranged by R. Bardzimashvili)
11. "Troubadour na magistrali" (Russian: «Трубадур на магистрали»), Magnetic Band (G. Graps – V. Mirtem)
12. "Moya Gruzia" (Russian: «Моя Грузия»), Labyrinth (M. Kiladze – I. Noneshvili)
13. "Reka Tuni" (Russian: «Река Туни»), Gunesh (Turkmen folk song, arranged by Sh. Byashimov)
14. "Podsnezhnik" (Russian: «Подснежник»), Integral (Tatar folk song, arranged by B. Alibasov and V. Dolenko)

== Controversies ==
Among the notable participants, the veteran Soviet rock bands VIA-Ariel and Stas Namin Group did not win any prizes. Boris Grebenshchikov’s Aquarium was also left without laurels, but the band's outlandish stage antics made Aquarium into a symbol of the Soviet alternative culture. The jury members walked out of a concert when the musicians drank port wine right on the stage and made provocative body movements, with Grebenshchikov playing his guitar in the prone position. The show came as a shock to the organizers and led to an effective ban of the band. Yet, Aquarium managed to organize a second concert in Gori, Georgia, in a spacious circus hall near the birthplace of Joseph Stalin. The concert was filmed by a Finnish TV crew and the segments were included into a 40-minute film of the Tbilisi festival called Soviet Rock.

== See also ==
- List of historic rock festivals
- List of jam band music festivals
