= Gunnar Graps =

Estonian musician

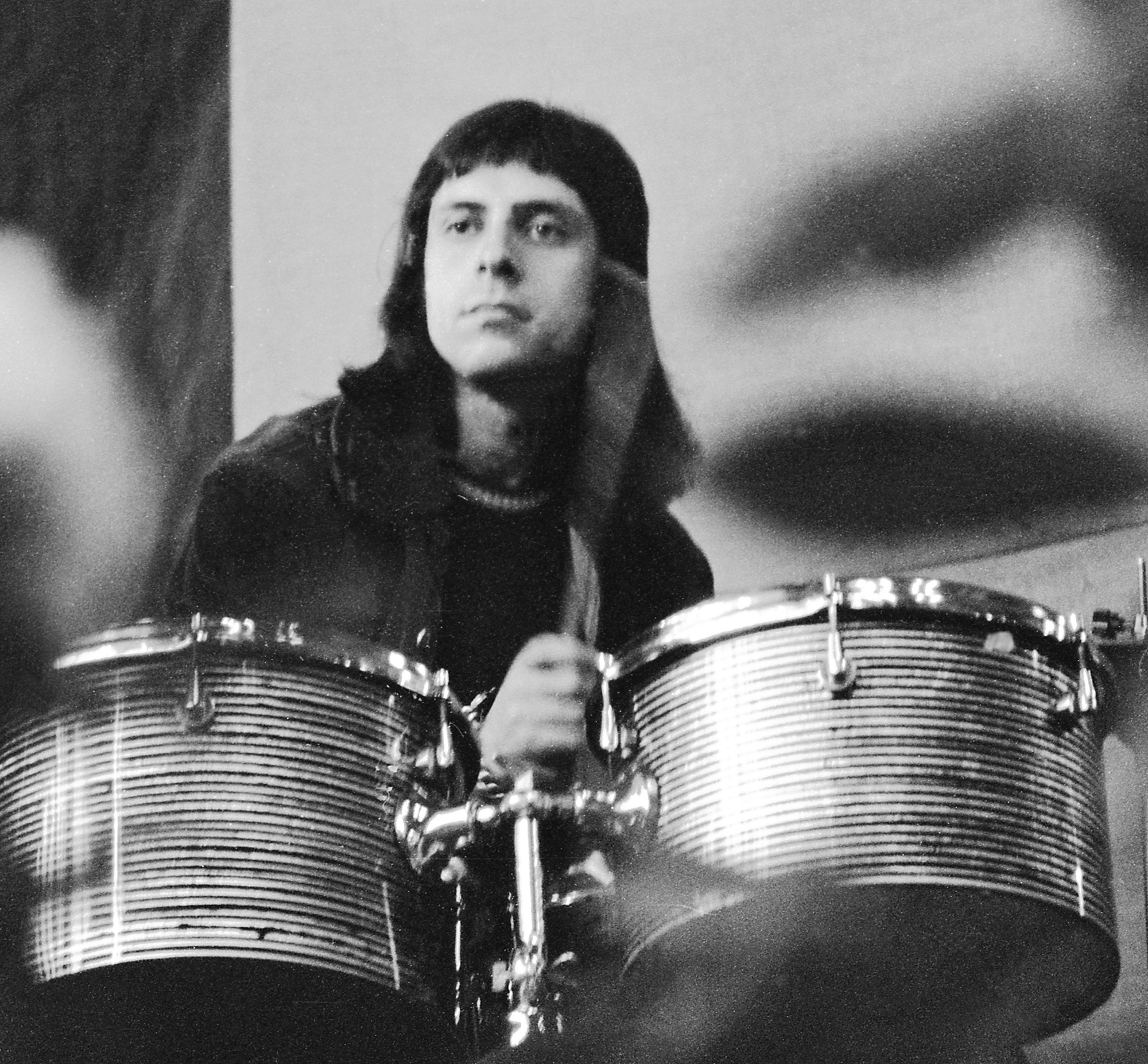
- Gunnar Graps, 1974

Background information
- Born: Gunnar Graps-Grāfs; 27 November 1951; Tartu, then part of Estonian SSR, Soviet Union
- Died: 17 May 2004 (aged 52) Tallinn, Estonia
- Genres: Jazz, Pop rock, Beat music, Rock, Blues, Heavy metal
- Instruments: Vocals, Cello, Drums, Guitar, Bass, Keyboards, Piano, Harmonica
- Years active: 1963–2004

Gunnar Graps-Grāfs (27 November 1951 – 17 May 2004) was a popular Estonian musician and one of the pioneers of hard rock in Estonia and the former Soviet Union. He has sold hundreds of thousands of records all over the world and in 2004 Graps was given a lifetime award at Estonian Music Awards. He has been compared to Mick Jagger and Alice Cooper, both who were his own personal idols, and is often called Raudmees (Iron Man).

== Biography ==
=== Start of music career, 1960s ===
Gunnar Graps was born to Latvian conductor, cellist and musical pedagogue Igors Gunārs Graps-Grāfs and his Estonian wife Salme (née Pluum). Graps was inspired to turn to music by his father at the age of six when he started to learn cello. In 1964, being only 13, he joined his first band Satelliidid as a guitarist. In spring of 1967 Graps joined Mikronid, where he played drums for the next six years. In 1970–1972 he was in the army and during that period he performed with Ivo Linna. He spent another year behind the drums in Mikronid after his return from military service. In spring 1968 Jüri Lina recorded about ten Mikronid's songs which also included Graps' creation for his show "Pobifo Revüü".

=== Golden-Age of his music, 1970s ===
After leaving the group Mikronid Graps created Ornament in 1973, which was one of the pioneers of hard rock in Estonia and the USSR (Estonia was occupied by the Soviet Union in 1944–1991). Ornament's music was influenced by Led Zeppelin and psychedelic rock. In 1976 Graps put together a new outfit called Magnetic Band which was Jazz-rock oriented, with reggae and funk-soul influences.

In 1977 Graps graduated from Tallinn Music School, from the percussion instruments department. Soon after that he reformed his group and they started leaning towards hard rock. Soon Magnetic Band became one of the most popular heavy-music bands in the Soviet Union. They won first prize at the first official rock-festival of the Soviet Union which took place in Tbilisi thanks to their hit "Lady Blues" and became the stars of Yerevan-81 international pop-rock-festival. "Garbed in fire-engine red pants and white shirt decorated with a splashy 7-Up emblem, Graps sang: "Since we have nowhere else to make love/we do it out in the open/And sometimes the rain washes away the makeup/from her face—and mine", wrote Time magazine in 1981.

=== At the top, 1980s ===
His popularity peaked in the 1980s. Magnetic Band constantly toured the Soviet Union. In 1982, Washington Post dedicated a whole page to Gunnar Graps and the Magnetic Band. It was no surprise that in 1983 Magnetic Band got banned by the Soviet authorities, which led to creation of GGG (Gunnar Graps Group). The change also marked a shift towards straightforward hard rock and heavy metal, genres which Magnetic Band were already flirting with (Note: all the musical groups in Soviet Union had to be evaluated before they were allowed to perform or exist at all).

After Mikhail Gorbachev became the new leader of the Soviet regime, GGG experienced less obstruction from the Soviet authorities. In 1988, they released their only LP entitled Põlemine (Burning). The vinyl was issued by Melodiya, the only record company in the entire USSR. Distribution of the record was very high. At the time, GGG consisted of Gunnar Graps (drums, percussion, vocals, keyboards), Juri Stihhanov (lead guitar), Andres Aak (now known as Angela Aak, rhythm guitar), Jüri Roosa (bass guitar) and Tiit Altosaar (drums on some songs, as Graps tended to perform most drumming (along with singing) himself). They performed in Estonia and many locations over the former Soviet Union and were popular until their fade in the end of decade. Their most popular songs were "Põlemine" (Burning), "Valgus" (Light), the ballad "Mosaiik" (Mosaic), "Raudmees" (Iron Man) – a song which gave Graps his nickname.

During the Singing Revolution, in 1987, a choir composed of well-known Estonian singers, Gunnar Graps among them, recorded Alo Mattiisen's song "Ei ole üksi ükski maa", a patriotic song about Estonia.

In 1989 Gunnar Graps moved to the United States in the hopes of reaching new heights with his musical career but, alas, failed to reach those previous lofty heights and was compelled to work as a repairman – to "make ends meet".

=== Start of decline, 1990s ===
After the end of the Soviet occupation, when Estonia had been restored into a fully independent country in 1991, Graps returned to his homeland. In the summer of 1993, he was caught, while working as a DJ at the nightclub on the ferryboat "Estonia", trying to cross the border to Sweden with anabolic steroids and was imprisoned for two months in Sweden. Graps reportedly did not complain about his imprisonment and praised the jail as being better than restaurants in Estonia. After his release, Graps came back to Estonia. Financial problems arose once more and he was compelled to work at local radio stations and night-clubs as a DJ, playing music he hated. In 1995, Graps released "Tühjad pihud" (Empty Hands) and reformed GGG the next year, performing about once a month. Graps was becoming more and more depressed.

=== Last years ===
Starting in the 21st century, Graps was still having financial troubles and performed in a series of Hansapank pension fund commercials. The commercials included a word play of "Tühjad pihud" (Empty Hands) record. In 2002, a 3 CD collection of Gunnar Graps' music, from all his tenures with past bands, was released as part of "Eesti kullafond" (Estionian Gold Fund) series. In 2003, Gunnar Graps performed at one of his last big concerts before death. An incarnation of Magnetic Band played in front of approx. 600 people at Green Christmas Festival in Rakvere, Estonia.

Despite his health problems, Graps did not want to give up on music and in 2003 he released "Rajalt maas" (Off the Track), which had a strong blues influence. In one of his last interviews Graps promised to go on tour in Russia, because he was disappointed in the local music scene. Three months before his death he was still looking forward to continue his career and in an interview for Sakala, an Estonian newspaper, he promised to release a new album by the end of 2004 and another record in 2005. On 17 May 2004, at the age of 52, Gunnar Graps died of a heart attack at his home on Mooni street in Tallinn.

== Legacy ==
Gunnar Graps is considered a rock idol by many Estonians. Another popular Estonian band Metsatöll have said that Gunnar Graps means the same to Estonian metal as Black Sabbath means to the world.

Also, numerous tribute events have spawned, paying homage to the early departed musician. These events take place around Graps' birthday month and death month. A string of local bands usually perform at the event along with incarnations of GGG or Magnetic Band, with people Graps used to play with. Gunnar Graps was inducted into the Hall Of Fame of Rock Cafe, a local pub (operated by the owners of Radio Mania, also the place where the tribute events take place), on 17 May 2005.

In December 2005, Hard Rock Club started collecting funds to erect a memorial headstone at Graps' grave. A fund-rising concert was held on 5 March 2006 at Rock Cafe in Tallinn. The stone was designed by Graps' son Jan Graps and placed on his grave at Rahumäe cemetery on 17 May 2006.

A cover band – Gunnar's Roses – was also active at some point during 2005–2006, performing at Hard Rock Laager in 2005 (a heavy metal festival created by Hard Rock Club) and at smaller pubs. The band was put together by Henri "Suss" Hinno (drummer of Manatark and Must Missa) who took the role of the drummer. Hinno is known to be a big fan of Graps' work and sang "Mosaiik" live with Gunnar's Roses.

In 2011, dramatist Ivar Põllu's play Raudmees. Odysseuse eksirännakud, which focuses of the life of Graps, was performed at the New Tartu Theatre in Tartu. Directed by Robert Annus, the play featured actor Juss Haasma as Graps and a musical score that consisted of many of Graps' most well-known songs.

== Singing style ==
Gunnar Graps' singing style was somewhat similar to the style James Hetfield of Metallica used to have, which was essentially trying to sing from the throat to produce a raspier sound. A very busy schedule contributed to the development of his signature rasp. It was not uncommon for Graps to perform even 3 shows per day and 25 days in a month. He was still able to produce very high notes, as is evident from his songs and Jesus Christ Superstar song "Gethsamen", which is included on the Gunnar Graps – Eesti kullafond 4. He is known to have trained his voice by yelling at walls; he usually did it before going on stage.

== Partial discography ==
Magnetic Band

- Magnetic Band, (1978, EP) Issued by soviet record company Melodjia
- Roosid papale (Roses for Papa) (1981, LP) Issued by Melodija

GGG

- Põlemine (Burning) (1988, LP) Issued by Melodija

Solo

- Tühjad pihud (Empty Hands) (1995, CD) Issued by Elwood
- Rajalt maas (Off the Track) (2003, CD/MC) Issued by Elwood

Compilation

- Gunnar Graps – Eesti kullafond 4 (2002, 3CD/3MC) TT Rec
