= The Tuberkuloited =

Estonian musical group

The Tuberkuloited is an Estonian punk rock band created in 1991 by Alar Aigro and Indrek "Summer" Raadik in Sindi. In Estonia they had a few hits like "Lilleke rohus" and "Näkineiud" They were known for their melodic approach to punk rock.

== Discography ==
- Klassiõhtu (1994) - MC
- Lilleke rohus (1994) - MC
- Religioon (1995) - CD/MC
- Õhtupimedas (1997) - CD/MC
- D-duur, Volume 6 (1999) - CD/MC
- Kiirteel (2000) - CD/MC
- Wiimane (2001) - CD/MC
- Estraadialbum (2003) - CD/MC
- Põlevad väljad (2004) - CD/DVD
- Mis sa teed (2007) - CD
