= Magnetic Band =

Estonian musical group

- Origin: Tallinn
- Genres: Heavy metal, jazz rock
- Years active: 1976–1983
- Members: Jüri Roosa, Erki Sepp
- Past members: Gunnar Graps, Vjatšeslav Kobrin

Magnetic Band was an Estonian metal-rock and jazz-rock band.

== History ==
Magnetic Band was formed in 1976 by Gunnar Graps. They played jazz-rock, which had influences of reggae and funk-soul. Later, after Graps graduated from Tallinn music school (in 1977), Magnetic Band was reformed and started to play metal-rock as well. Magnetic Band soon became one of the most popular heavy-music bands in Soviet Union.

In 1980 Magnetic Band got first prize in the Tbilisi Rock Festival (1980). They performed a mixture of jazz-rock, blues and funk and was noted for their instrumental mastership.

In 1982, the Washington Post dedicated a whole page to Gunnar Graps and the Magnetic Band. In 1983, Magnetic Band got banned by Soviet authorities and was renamed to Gunnar Graps Group (GGG). GGG performed in Estonia and Soviet Union and was very popular until the end of decade.

They performed until 1989. In 1997, the GGG reunited, although they performed only about once a month.
