= Kristiina Ojuland =

Estonian politician (born 1966)

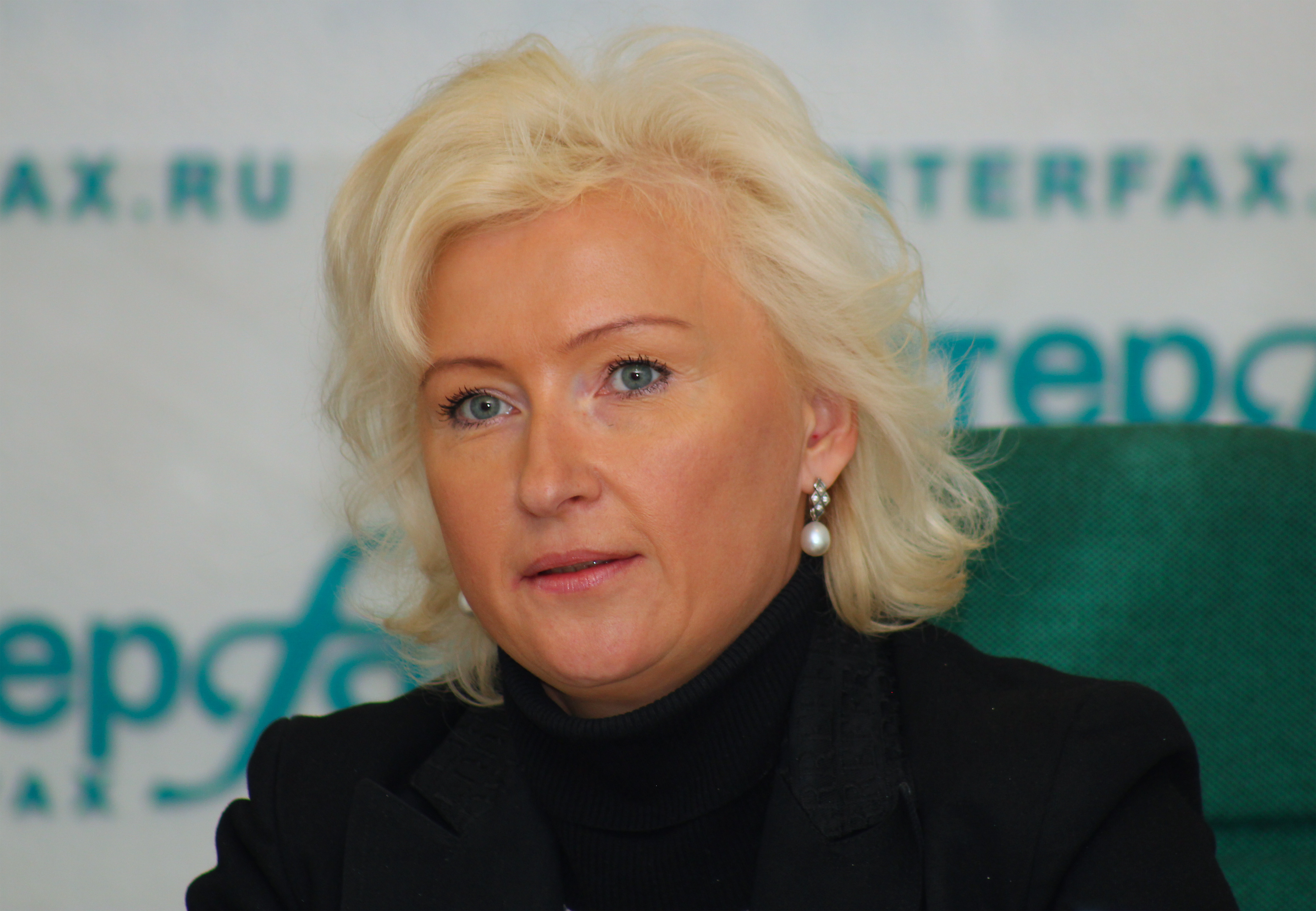

Minister of Foreign Affairs
- In office 28 January 2002 – 8 February 2005
- Prime Minister: Siim Kallas; Juhan Parts
- Preceded by: Toomas Hendrik Ilves
- Succeeded by: Rein Lang

Personal details
- Born: 17 December 1966 (age 59) Kohtla-Järve, then part of Estonian SSR, Soviet Union
- Party: Reform Party, People's Unity Party

Kristiina Ojuland (born 17 December 1966 in Kohtla-Järve) is an Estonian politician. She was the Foreign Minister of Estonia from 2002 through 2005. She was a member of the Estonian Reform Party from 1995 till 5 June 2013 and from 2009 to 2014 she served as one of the six Estonian MEPs in the European Parliament. She was expelled from the Reform Party because of alleged vote rigging on 5 June 2013. She later founded the Party of People's Unity, which failed to gain any seats in the 2015 and 2019 parliamentary election.

== Education ==
In 1990 she received her LL.B. from University of Tartu. In 1992 she graduated from the Estonian School of Diplomacy in Tallinn and attended the Graduate Institute of International Studies in Geneva special program. In 1993 she attended the Vienna School of International Studies, special program.

== Beginning of career ==
Between 1990 and 1992 Ojuland worked in the Draft Legislation Department of the Estonian Ministry of Justice. She moved to the Ministry of Foreign Affairs in 1992 to work on affairs related to the Council of Europe, and she was promoted to be Estonia's Permanent Representative to the Council in 1993, a post she held for one year, before moving to become Director of the Estonian Broadcasting Association.

== Reform Party politician ==
In 1994 she moved into politics, becoming a member of the Riigikogu and the parliament's Foreign Affairs Committee, as well as chair of the Estonian-French parliamentary friendship group from 1996. She joined the Estonian Reform Party in 1995, becoming their Foreign Affairs Spokesperson. With the party's affiliation to the European Liberal, Democrat and Reform Party (ELDR), she rose to the post of Vice President in 1999, as well as Leader of the LDR group in the Parliamentary Assembly of the Council of Europe (PACE), to which she had been head of the Estonian Parliamentary Delegation since 1996.

Ojuland was the Estonian minister of foreign affairs from 2002 to 2005, when she was fired by President Arnold Ruutel after secret files disappeared from her ministry. She chaired the European Affairs Committee of the Riigikogu from 2004-07. In June 2004 she ran for the post of secretary-general of the Council of Europe, but was defeated, receiving 51 of 299 votes. She was the first vice-speaker of the parliament from 2007 to 2009, at which point she became a Member of the European Parliament for the ALDE. From 2007 to 2014 she was the Vice President of the ELDR and Vice-chair of the Alliance of Liberals and Democrats for Europe in the Parliamentary Assembly of the Council of Europe.

Ojuland was expelled from the Reform Party because of alleged vote rigging on 5 June 2013.

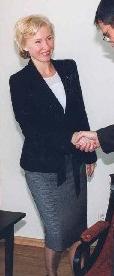
Kristiina Ojuland in 2004.

== Party of People's Unity ==
In 2014, Ojuland founded and become the leader of the Party of People's Unity. She began to express strong anti-immigration and anti-Islam views, such as calling for a ban on the Quran and claiming that the white race is in danger. The party failed to gain any seats in the 2015 and 2019 parliamentary elections, and was dissolved in 2019.

== Decorations ==
- Commander of the Legion of Honour (France)
- Grand Cross of the Order of Infante D. Henrique (Portugal)
- The Order of the National Coat of Arms 5th class (Estonia)
- Grand Decoration of Honour in Gold with Star for Services to the Republic of Austria (2007)

== Personal life ==
From 1987 to 2000, Ojuland was married to Erik Siigur. Later, her partner was businessman Raimo Kägu.

== Other ==
In 2007, Ojuland participated as a celebrity contestant on the second season of Tantsud tähtedega, an Estonian version of Dancing with the Stars. Her professional dancing partner was Aleksandr Makarov.

Political offices
Preceded by Toomas Hendrik Ilves	Minister of Foreign Affairs; January 2002 – February 2005	Succeeded by Rein Lang
