= Pantokraator =

Estonian band

- Origin: Tartu, Estonia

Pantokraator is an Estonian band that blends elements of progressive rock and folk music. Growing from a garage band in Tartu, the ensemble soon gained a devoted audience from its unique and exotic sounds. After several years in hiatus, Pantokraator returned to the active music world with its 2009 release Tormidesööjad (The Storm Eaters).

== History ==
The core of what became Pantokraator came together in Tartu in the early 1980s when a group of school friends formed the band Propaan (Propane). This included Erik Sakkov – who became the core of the band's music since its inception – along with friends Riho Kukk and Mait Karm. In 1983, the band changed its name to Pantogrator, which evolved over the years first to Pantograator to its best-known (and current) version Pantokraator in 1988.

With a year of gigging behind them, the band was awarded accolades at the Tartu Autumn rock festival for the rising star and the people's choice awards in 1984, earning them access to professional rehearsal space and equipment. It was at that point their career-long links to sound engineer Mart Moldau were forged, ones that would last to this present day.

The band's first major media exposure came in 1985 when their rock opera Merikajakas (Seagull) was recorded during one of its performances as the band toured the country. The following year, the band took part in the Tartu Music Days, which was at the time one of the most prestigious rock festivals in the former USSR.

By then the band's composition had altered slightly; changes included Jaan Sööt joining as guitarist and Peeter Jõgioja on drums. However, their momentum was interrupted in 1987 as the principal members of the band were forced into military service.

Once conscription ended for the members of the band, Sakkov and the now experienced band brought vocalist Lauri Saatpalu into the band. Saatpalu's vocal style would become a trademark to the Pantokraator sound from that point on. Their success continued, with appearances in many large festivals in Estonia and even tours outside of Estonia.

As the Singing Revolution moved ahead in Estonia, many of the country's rock bands played their role in creating dynamic Estonian music in many genres. It was in 1990 that the band managed to release their first LP, named Pantokraator I. But with the restoration of the country's independence, realities of life – especially economic considerations – took over, and the band broke up in 1992.

The band did not reappear for another 14 years. During that time, members pursued their own careers in and out of the music world. Most prominently, vocalist Lauri Saatpalu fronted the folk group Dagö. In 2006, Saatpalu and Sakkov agreed to put the band back together and started working on new material the year after.

In 2007–08, the newly reformed Pantokaator, augmented by a team of new bandmates, put together new material which eventually turned into the 2009 release Tormidesööjad. To celebrate their history and rebirth, they also released previously unavailable material in a special boxed set.

They also performed a gig at the revived Tartu Musical Days festival in May 2009.

== Current members ==
- Henno Kelp – bass
- Taavi Langi – guitars
- Roland Puusepp – percussions
- Taavi Peterson – vocals
- Erik Sakkov – keyboards
- Triinu Taul – vocals

With Mart Moldau and Ergo Ehte as sound engineers.
