= Gunnar Graps Group =

Estonian musical group

Gunnar Graps Group (Estonian: Gunnar Grapsi Grupp, GGG) were an Estonian rock group.

== Background ==
The group was formed by Gunnar Graps in January, 1984 in Tallinn after his previous Magnetic Band was banned by Soviet authorities. In 1980s, the GGG achieved popularity also in Russia.

After the band's participation in Tartu rock-festival in 1984, the group entered to state philarmonia. GGG played the songs of Graps, Led Zeppelin, Rolling Stones and others. In 1988, they recorded their first official album in Melodia. Among the most popular songs of GGG are "Roosid papale", "Rahatuvi", "Äärelinna blues", "Onu Volli lugu", "Tühjad pihud", "Raudmees", "Valgus".

According to Stas Namin, "Gunnar was a real, non-compromise rock-n-roll man. He always demonstrated the clear style".
