= Ei ole üksi ükski maa =

Estonian patriotic song

Ei ole üksi ükski maa ('No Land Is Alone') is an Estonian patriotic song, which was created in 1987 by Alo Mattiisen. The lyrics were created by Jüri Leesment. The song was created in order to support movement against phosphorite mining in Virumaa (so called Phosphorite War).

The song is repeatedly represented in major music festivals in Estonia, e.g. in 2002 in IX Youth Singing Festival.

== Lyrics ==
Estonian original

Jääb ikka nii, et Saaremaa
näeb õhtupäikse õitsemist.
Ta kõrval tunneb Hiiumaa
üht õiget sugu õitsilist.
Veel linnupesi Läänemaal
võib leida rannaroost,
veel aru annab Harjumaa
me rahva sünniloost.

Ei taha, ei või, ei saa sind jätta, Virumaa!

Teab loodus vaid, teab isamaa –
meil tuleb üksteist aidata
Ei ole üksi ükski maa,
ei taha, ei saa sind jätta, Virumaa!

Ei ole jännis Järvamaa,
kui seemne ootel põld on must.
Ei peleta meid Pärnumaa
jutt põlislaande eksinust.
Kas tarkust toitev Tartumaa
teab, mis on mehemeel?
Kui kaua suudab Võrumaa
end hoida õigel teel?

Ei taha, ei või, ei saa sind jätta, Virumaa!

Teab loodus vaid, teab isamaa –
meil tuleb üksteist aidata
Ei ole üksi ükski maa,
ei taha, ei saa sind jätta, Virumaa!

Kas jääb ka nii, et Mulgimaa
eal pügada ei lase end?
Kas vaikust valvav Valgamaa
on hüüdjatega ühinend?
Kui puhtaks jäävad Virumaal
kõik selge veega allikad,
siis alles julgen ütelda,
et elan omal maal.

Teab loodus vaid, teab isamaa –
meil tuleb üksteist aidata
Ei ole üksi ükski maa,
ei taha, ei saa sind jätta, Virumaa!

Ei ole üksi ükski maa!

Teab loodus vaid, teab isamaa –
meil tuleb üksteist aidata
Ei ole üksi ükski maa,
ei taha, ei saa sind jätta, Virumaa!

Ei ole üksi ükski maa...
Ei ole üksi ükski maa...
Ei ole üksi ükski maa...

Metrical English translation

It remains the case that Saaremaa
sees the evening sun blossom.
Next to him, Hiiumaa
knows a truly flourishing nation.
More bird nests in Läänemaa
can be found in beach reeds,
Still report on, will Harjumaa
the story of the birth of our nation.

Don't want, can't, can't leave you, Virumaa!

Only nature knows, the fatherland knows -
we have to help each other
No land is alone,
Don't want, can't leave you, Virumaa!

Not stuck at all is Järvamaa
if the field is black waiting for the seed.
Won't scare us Pärnumaa's
story of getting lost in the native forest.
Maybe wisdom-nourishing Tartumaa
knows what a man's mind is?
How long can Võrumaa
stay on the right track?

Don't want, can't, can't leave you, Virumaa!

Only nature knows, the fatherland knows -
we have to help each other
No land is alone,
Don't want, can't leave you, Virumaa!

Will it still be the case that Mulgimaa
does not allow itself to be pruned?
Is silence-guarding Valgamaa
in union with the shouters?
If all springs in Virumaa
with clear water remain clean
then I dare say
that I live in my own country.

Only nature knows, the motherland knows -
we have to help each other
No land is alone,
I don't want to, I can't leave you, Virumaa!

No land is alone!

Only nature knows, the motherland knows -
we have to help each other
No land is alone,
I don't want to, I can't leave you, Virumaa!

No land is alone...
No land is alone...
No land is alone...

== Tujurikkuja version ==
At the end of 2015, a younger generation of singers performed a remake in the satirical program Tujurikkuja in the manner of Mattiisen, which poked fun about the intolerance towards refugees, gays, Black people, muslims, Russians and simply other Estonians in an ironic fashion. The text written by Märt Avandi, Ott Sepp and Õ-Fraktsioon also alluded to other political issues, such as the Syrian civil war.

=== Lyrics ===
Estonian original

Jääb ikka nii, et Saaremaal
ei toimu eales lõimumist.
Ta kõrval tunneb Hiiumaa
et liiga vähe vihkab vist.
Paar nõginägu Läänemaal
võib leida rannaroost,
nad sinna peksis Harjumaa
sest null on meie kvoot!

Ei taha, ei või, ei saa, piir kinni Virumaal!

Teab loodus vaid, teab isamaa
et neegri koht on Aafrikas!
Seal kaugel võime neid sallida
ja kõiki teisi loomaliike ka!

Ei ole jännis Järvamaa,
seal pole muldki kuigi must
Veel südikam on Pärnumaa
ka mustal leival näitab ust.
Teab tarkust toitev Tartumaa,
et islam on vist... seen?
Mis teha siis, vaeb Võrumaa
kui murjan on Tšetšeen?

Ei tahagi teada kah - ah, kõik üks Mooramaa!

Teab loodus vaid, teab isamaa –
neil meeldib ennast õhata!
Me rass on ohus, Kristiina ka.
See pole rassism vaid puhas loogika!

Ei jää see nii, et Mulgimaa
vaid jälestab võõrast keelt!
Ka teatab vapralt Valgamaa
et suudab raevuda mitmekesiselt.
Kui russofoobia Virumaal
käib käsikäes homofoobiaga,
siis alles julgen ütelda,
et elan omal maal.

Teab loodus vaid, teab isamaa –
meil meeldib kõike vihata!
Kui keegi naerab, kui vesi keeb,
või kui üldse keegi midagigi teeb!

On vaid üks isend jälgim veel...

Teab loodus vaid, teab isamaa –
teist eestlast me ei või seedida
Meid on küll vähe, kuid ühtsena
kõik kargame külakuhja kaklema!

Ei ole üksi ükski maa...
Ei ole üksi ükski maa...
Või kui, siis ainult Süüria

English translation

So be it that in Saaremaa
no integration is to ever happen.
Next to it, Hiiumaa feels
that it might not hate enough.
A few negroes in Läänemaa.
can be found in beach reeds,
They were beaten there by Harjumaa
as zero's our quota!

Don't want, won't and can't - close the borders at Virumaa!

Only nature knows, the fatherland knows -
a nigger's place is in Africa!
Far away there, we can tolerate them
and every other animal species too!

No issues in Järvamaa,
even the dirt there isn't very black.
Even more active is Pärnumaa
even black bread is shown the door.
Knows wisdom-nourishing Tartumaa
that Islam is a... mushroom?
What to do, wonders Võrumaa
if the black is a Chechen?

Don't even know or care - ah, all the same Negro land!

Only nature knows, the fatherland knows -
they like to blow themselves up!
Our race is endangered, Kristiina too
It's not racism, just pure logic!

It won't remain that Mulgimaa
merely despises the foreign language!
So too, proudly announces Valgamaa
that it can rage diversely.
If Russophobia in Virumaa
goes hand-in-hand with homophobia
only then dare I say
that I live in my own country.

Only nature knows, the motherland knows -
we like to hate everything!
When someone laughs, when water boils
or when anyone does anything at all!

There's only one creature even worse...

Only nature knows, the motherland knows -
we cannot tolerate another Estonian!
We may be few, but united
we'll pile on top of each other and fight!

No land is alone...
No land is alone...
Or if else, then only Syria
