= Ultima Thule (Estonian band) =

Estonian rock band

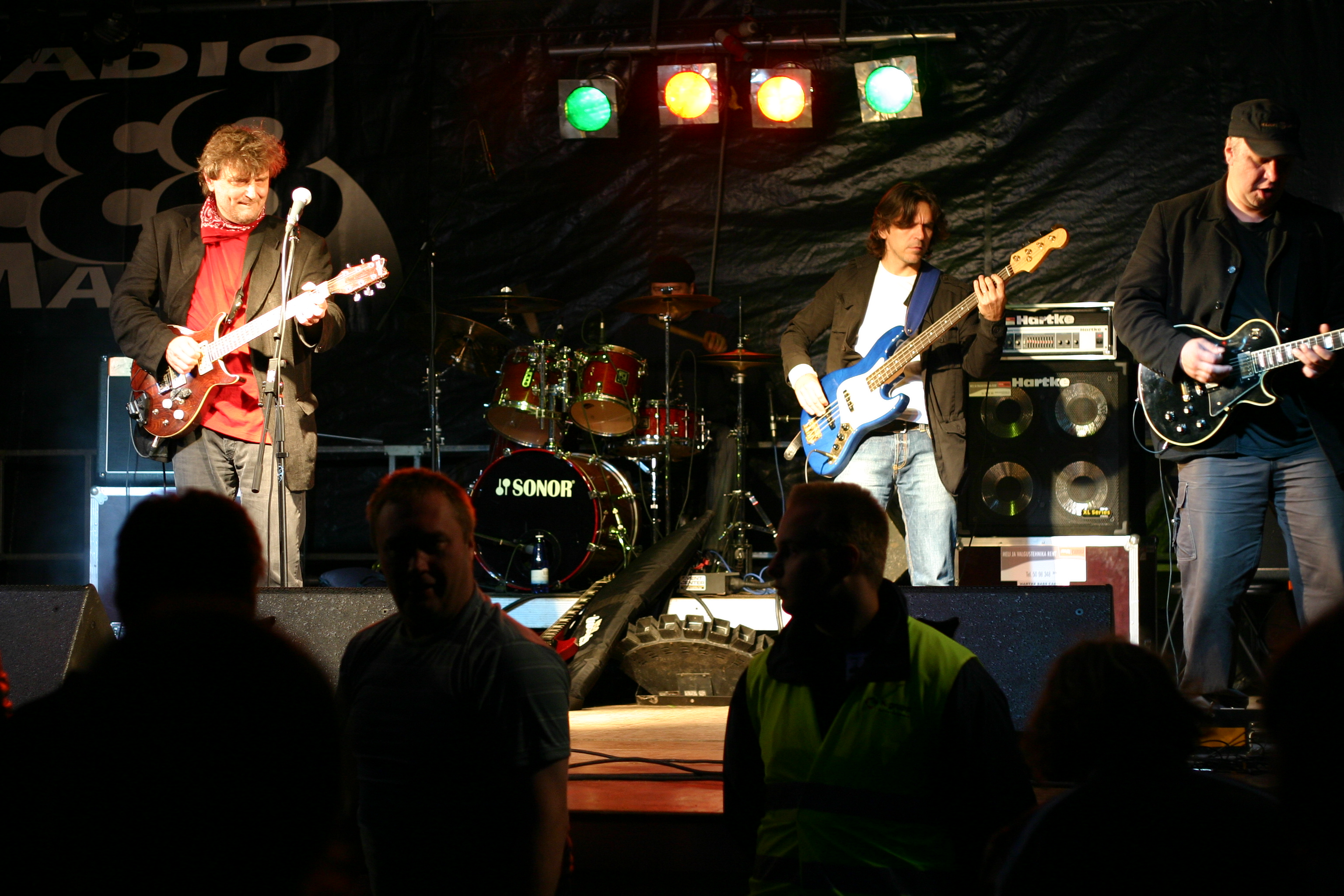
- Ultima Thule (2006)

Background information
- Origin: Tallinn, Estonia
- Genres: Rock, blues rock, folk rock
- Years active: 1986–present
- Labels: HyperElwood; Kaljuste Music Group
- Members: Raul Vaigla; Tõnis Mägi; Toomas Rull; Kalle Vilpuu; Aare Põder
- Past members: Peeter Jõgioja; Slava Kobrin; Andrus Lillepea; Jaak Ahelik; Silvi Vrait; Riho Sibul

Ultima Thule is an Estonian rock band, active since 1986. The leader of the group has been the guitarist and (later) singer Riho Sibul. Ultima Thule has been one of the most influential Estonian bands of the 1980s and 1990s. Their style has been characterized as a blend of blues rock with witty lyrics and influences of Estonian folk music.

The original singer of the band, Tõnis Mägi has in the 2000s mainly chosen a solo career as well as the former drummer Peeter Jõgioja (featuring also in 2004 Eurovision song contest with the group Neiokõsõ).
