= Music of Latvia =

Traditional Latvian music is often set to traditional poetry called dainas, featuring pre-Christian themes and legends, drone vocal styles, and Baltic psaltery.

== Dainas ==
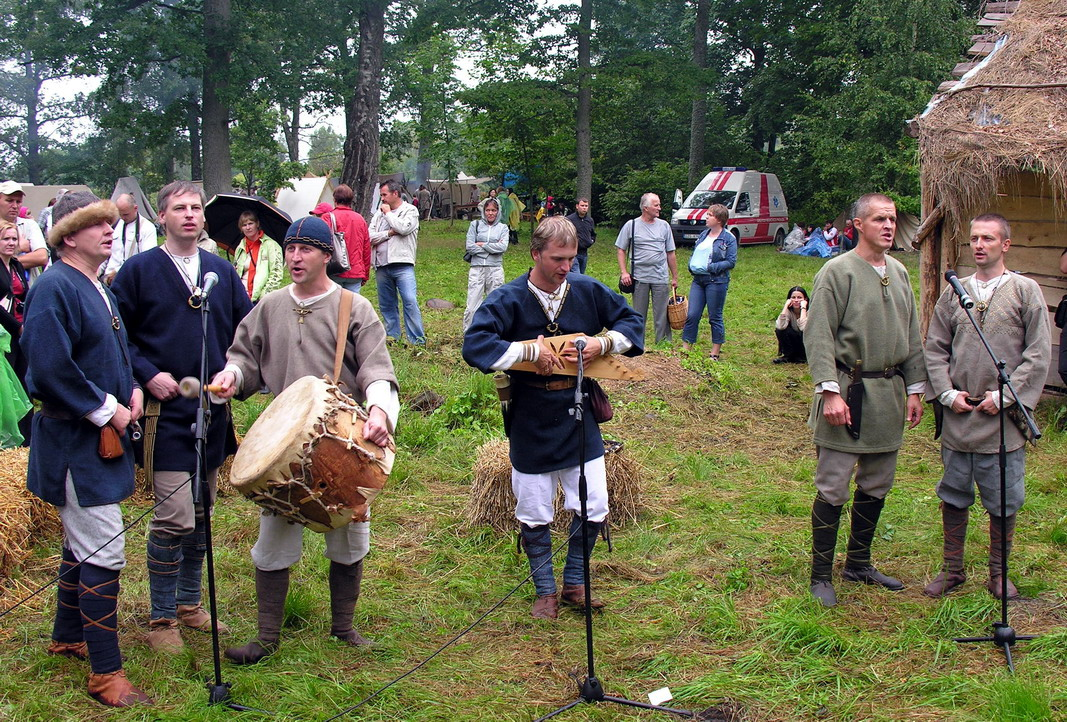
Latvian men's folk ensemble "Vilki" performing at the festival of Baltic crafts and warfare "Apuolė 854" in Apuolė Castle mound, August 2009

Traditional Latvian folklore, especially the dance of the folk songs, date back well over a thousand years. More than 1.2 million texts and 30,000 melodies of folk songs have been identified.

Dainas are very short, which usually consist only one or two stanzas, are unrhymed, and are in a four-footed trochaic metre. Lyrically, dainas concern themselves with native mythology, but in contrast to most similar forms, do not have any legendary heroes. Stories often revolve around pre-Christian deities like the sun goddess Saule, the moon god Mēness and, most notably, the life of people, especially its three most important events – birth, wedding, and death (including burial). The first collection of dainas was published between 1894 and 1915 as Latvju Dainas by Krišjānis Barons.

Latvian traditional folk song "Div' dūjiņas gaisā skrēja" performed by Lizete Iesmiņa-Mihelsone.

Latvju tautas mūzikas materiāli, translated in English as the Materials of Latvian Folk Music, is the anthology and commentary of Latvian folk. It analysed 5999 items of Latvian ethnography published in 6 editions from 1894 to 1926 by the Latvian musicologist and composer Andrejs Jurjāns (1856–1922).

Latvju tautas mūzikas materiāli Sestā grāmata (the sixth book) was published posthumously in Riga, 1926. On page 1 latvju komponistu biedrības izdevums is inscribed, translated as the Latvian Society of Composers edition.

== Instrumentation ==
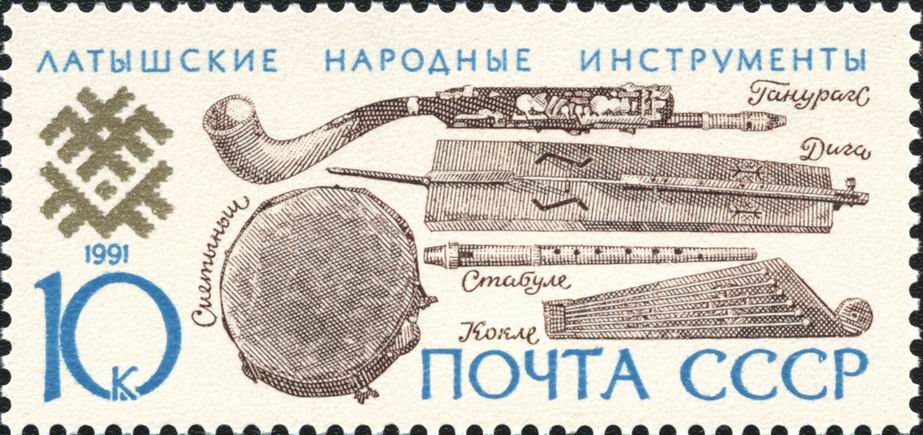
Latvian instruments on a Soviet Union stamp

Accompaniment to the village songs is played on various traditional instruments, the most significant of which is the kokles, a type of box zither related to the Lithuanian kanklės and other Baltic psalteries. In the 1970s, artists like Jānis Poriķis and Valdis Muktupāvels led a revival in kokles music, which had only survived in the Courland and Lettgallia regions. The Latvian-exile community abroad, especially in the United States, has also kept kokles traditions alive. In the last hundred years, a new kind of kokles was developed, with many more strings, halftones levelers and other improvements that expand the capacities of the instrument to play not only modal music but, in another point of view, displeased more traditional musicians. This modernized version of the instrument is called "concert kokles". However, currently Imants Robežnieks is the only remaining master concert kokles maker, although recently he has taken in two apprentices.

The musical tradition of Latvia includes several instruments, including string, woodwind, brass, and percussion instruments:

Image	Name	Type	Ref
	Birch trumpet	Brass instrument	
	Duda	Bowed string instrument	
	Dūdas	Bagpipe	
	Ganurags	Single-reed instrument	
	Ģīga	Bowed zither	
	Kokle	Box zither	
	Stabule	Woodwind instrument	
	Trīdeksnis	Percussion instrument	

== Classical music ==
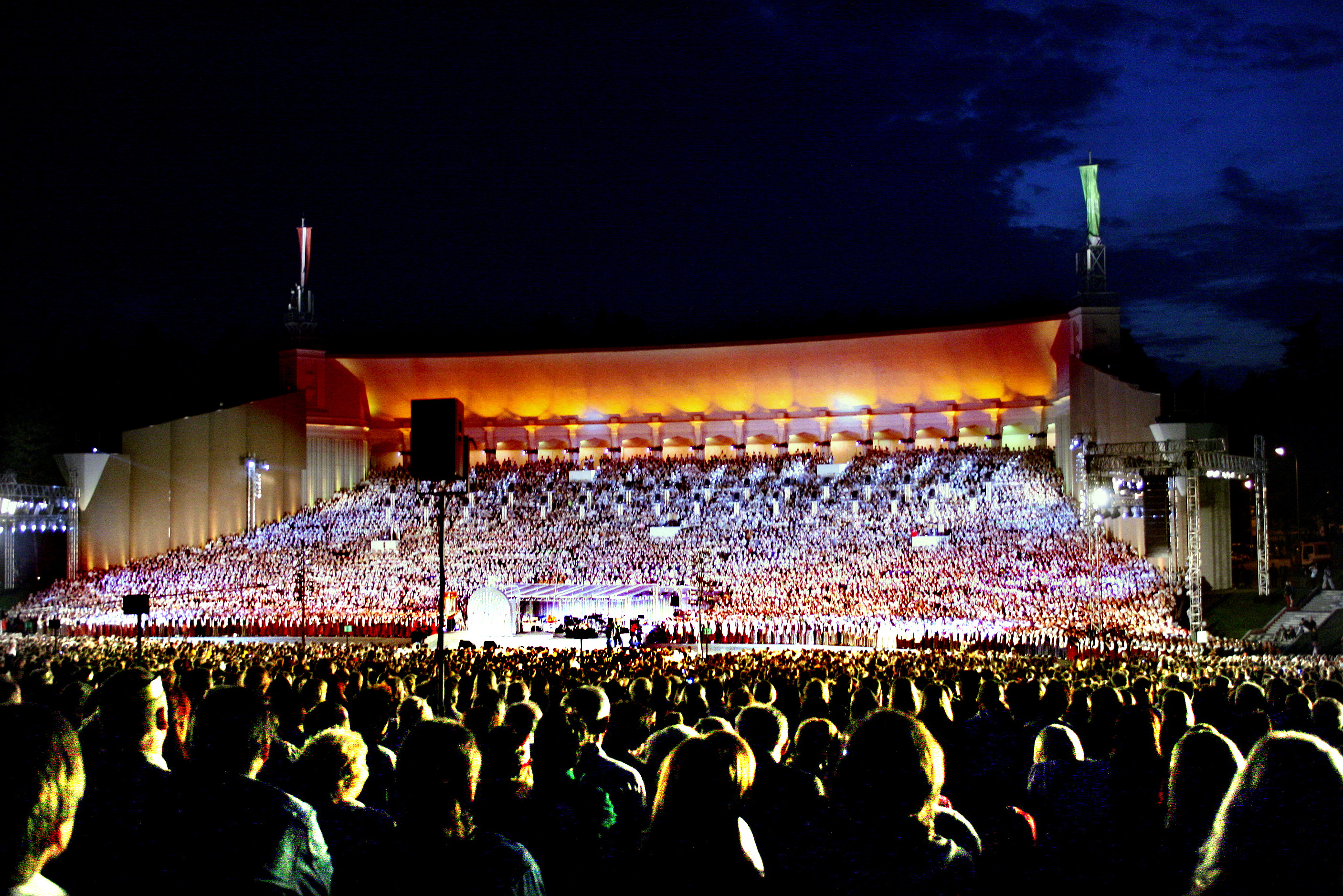
2008 Latvian Song and Dance Festival

Choir traditions are very strong in Latvia. Alongside many professional choirs, there are tens of thousands of Latvians who are part of different amateur choirs. Once every five years the Latvian National Song and Dance Festival takes place with around 20,000 singers taking part in it.

The 2014 World Choir Games took place in Riga.

This year (2019) Latvia hosts the inaugural Riga Jurmala Music Festival, a new festival in which world-famous orchestras and conductors perform across four weekends during the summer. The festival takes place at the Latvian National Opera, the Great Guild, and the Great and Small Halls of the Dzintari Concert Hall. This year features the Bavarian Radio Symphony Orchestra, the Israel Philharmonic Orchestra, the London Symphony Orchestra and the Russian National Orchestra.

Internationally famous Latvian musicians include conductors Arvīds Jansons and his son Mariss Jansons, Andris Nelsons, violinist Gidon Kremer, cellist Mischa Maisky, and soprano Kristīne Opolais.

== Popular music ==
During the Soviet era, rock music became extremely popular, because it, as well as folk songs, offered a chance to rebel against the local authorities. Imants Kalniņš was the most important composer of the time, and his songs were extremely popular. He also wrote music for the movie "Four White Shirts", which spoke about the need for freedom and was therefore banned. One of the most important social gatherings of the time was the annual Imantdiena ('The Day of Imants (Kalniņš)'), forbidden on grounds of interfering with hay-gathering. The tradition continued informally at the composer's house.

The songs of Imants Kalniņš were best known as performed by the group Menuets which only played songs by this composer. Most of the members of the group moved on to form another group, Pērkons ('Thunder') later. Pērkons was a symbol of rebellion. They played fascinating rock and roll bordering on hard rock music, composed by the band's frontman Juris Kulakovs, using poems mostly written by Māris Melgalvs. Many of those were strongly disapproved by the Soviet authorities, as they implied the ridiculousness of the system. The most famous concert by Pērkons resulted in the destruction of a train compartment by the young people who had attended the concert. This, as well as other events, is portrayed in the movie "Is It Easy to Be Young?" by Juris Podnieks. Acts such as Pērkons certainly played an important role in the lives of the youth of the time and were a serious challenge to the Soviet system.

Nowadays, the pop music sphere is dominated by pop music (e.g., Prāta vētra) and alternative rock.

=== List of composers and bands in Latvia ===
Composers of contemporary music	Rock or (and) Pop	Other
Maija Einfelde, Imants Kalniņš, Indra Riše, Jānis Lūsēns, Jānis Petraškēvičs, Mārtiņš Brauns, Pēteris Plakidis, Pēteris Vasks, Mārtiņš Viļums, Rihards Dubra, Aivars Kalējs, Romualds Kalsons, Juris Karlsons, Andris Dzenītis, Santa Ratniece; Uģis Prauliņš; Ēriks Ešenvalds	100. debija, A-Eiropa, Anton Frank, Ainars Mielavs, Aisha; Aparāts, Autobuss Debesīs, Astro'n'out, Bet Bet, Borowa MC, Citi Zēni, Collide, Detlef, Device, Dun Dun, Double Faced Eels, Eolika, Ella (Latvian DJ), Dzeltenie Pastnieki, F.L.Y., Frailty (band), Foxthroat, Helēna Kozlova, Hospitāļu iela, Iļģi, Imants Kalniņš, Fomins & Kleins, Iedomu spārni, Ieva Akurātere, Juris Kulakovs, Igo, Jauns Mēness, Jānis Žilde, Jumprava, Kaspars Dimiters, Kārlis Kazāks, Lauris Reiniks, Labvēlīgais tips, Lādezers, Linda Leen, Līvi, Logo, Marana, Marija Naumova, Menuets, Mirta, Mofo, Zigfrīds Muktupāvels; Oceanfall, Olive Mess, Pērkons, Pienvedēja Piedzīvojumi, Raimonds Pauls, Gunārs Rozenbergs, Prāta Vētra, Punch, R.A.P, RePublic, Uldis Stabulnieks, Skumju Akmeņi, Satellites LV, Skyforger, SoundArcade, The Mundane, Tranzīts, Tumsa, Vilki, Z-Scars	Tumors, 2tie, SoundArcade, Matīss Akuraters; 7obu; uamee

== See also ==
- Latvian musical bows
