= Kurbads (album) =

Studio album by Skyforger
- Released: April 26, 2010
- Recorded: 2008–2009
- Studio: Studio "Lauska"
- Genre: Folk metal, Viking metal, black metal
- Length: 49:43
- Label: Metal Blade
- Producer: Skyforger

Skyforger chronology
Zobena Dziesma (2003)	Kurbads (2010)	Senprūsija (2015)

Kurbads is the fifth studio album by the Latvian folk metal band Skyforger. The album was released on 26 April 2010 in Europe and on 11 May 2010 in the United States through Metal Blade Records.

== Recording and production ==
On 12 September 2008, Skyforger announced that the band had entered the studio to record their newest album. The recording took place at the band's former folk instrumentalist Kaspars' studio "Lauska", who was not an active member of the band anymore, but handled the sound engineering duties and appeared on the album. On May 7, 2009 the frontman Pēteris revealed the title and theme of the album. On 2 March, 2010 Skyforger posted online their first single "Son of the Mare" and revealed album cover, as well as the track list. One day later the band published a studio report on their official YouTube channel. In a later interview Pēteris recalled the album's recording process:

We recorded everything here in Latvia, in our band-mate’s Kaspars studio. So we hadn’t that much stress as we was alone there, it was like you are recording everything in your friends home. We recorded things, then went home and listened to them and if we aren’t satisfied, next time we rerecorded them. Kaspars asked not that much money for an hour as we’d spend in big professional studios. After all we did all of our albums this way – I mean here in Latvia, in our local friendly studios. I think we are used to it and possibly cannot record anything good in time limited foreign professional studios where every minute counts.

== Musical style and lyrical themes ==
On the same Facebook post revealing the album's title and theme Pēteris also described the meaning of the name "Kurbads" and what to expect lyric-wise:

"Kurbads" is the name of legendary hero from Latvian fairytales of an old. He was born magically from the white mare, grew up very fast and was unimaginably strong! In his tale he travels the world, fights various evil creatures, especially his sworn enemy Snake Witch, ventures into realm of the dead to save daughter of the king, finds the hard way out of there and finally fights in last epic battle against Snake Witch and her champion.

Alex Henderson of Allmusic in review described the musical style of the album as an "epic combination of black metal, death metal, thrash metal, Bathory, Iron Maiden, and East European folk".

== Reception ==
Professional ratings
Review scores
Source	Rating
About.com	4/5 stars
Allmusic	3.5/5 stars
Sputnikmusic	3/5 stars
Metal Underground	4/5 stars
Metal Review	(8.1/10)
Blistering.com	(7.5/10)
Lords of Metal	(87/100)

Kurbads has received positive reviews from music critics. George Pacheco of About.com gave the album 4 out of 5 stars and called it the band's "stylistic and creative peak." Mike Stagno of Sputnikmusic gave the album 3 out of 5 stars and summarized his review as "A solid, if generally unspectacular offering from Latvia's finest."

The album's only weak points, as noted by the reviewers, is the cover art that George Pacheco called "cheesy", as well as the vocal delivery of Pēteris whose harsh shouts Mike Stagno described as "irritating at the best of times" and noted the lack of high pitched growl utilization.

== Track listing ==
1. Curse of the Witch – 05:04
2. Son of the Mare – 05:26
3. The Nine-headed – 03:56
4. Bewitched Forest – 05:15
5. In the Yard of the Father's Son – 00:39
6. The Devilslayer – 05:05
7. The Stone Sentinel – 04:56
8. In the Underworld – 04:13
9. Black Rider – 04:16
10. The Last Battle – 05:38
11. Kurbads (bonus track) – 05:11

== Personnel ==
Skyforger

- Edgars "Zirgs" – bass, ģīga, backing vocals
- Pēteris "Peter" – vocals, guitars, lyrics
- Edgars "Mazais" – drums, backing vocals
- Kaspars Bārbals – dūdas, kokles, stabule, backing vocals
- Mārtiņš Pētersons – guitars, backing vocals

Guest musicians

- Sandis Korps – additional vocals
- Ģirts "Motors" Kļaviņš – additional vocals

Other personnel

- Gerda Buša – photography
- Gints Lundbergs – mixing, mastering
- Pēteris "Peter" – design, English translations, layout
- Andis "Hopkins" – English translations
- Ojārs Kalniņš – English translations
- Valdis Bērzvads – design, layout
- Mārtiņš Pētersons – cover art, artwork
