= Skyforger =

Latvian heavy metal band

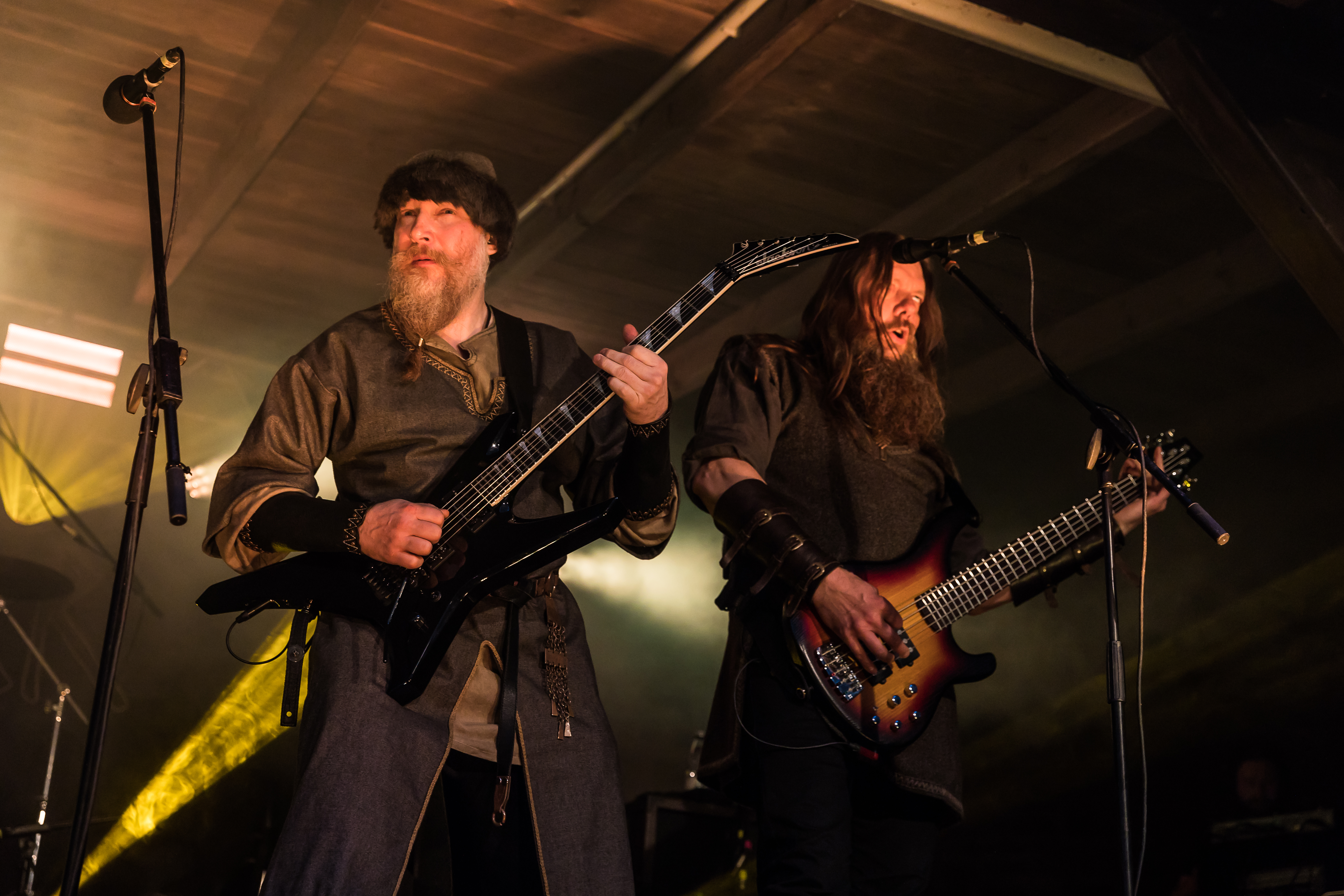
- Skyforger at Dark Troll festival 2026

Background information
- Origin: Riga, Latvia
- Genres: Pagan metal Folk metal Black metal
- Years active: 1995–present
- Labels: Metal Blade Records; Folter Records; Mascot Records
- Members: Pēteris Kvetkovskis; Edgars Grabovskis; Alvis Bernāns; Jānis Osis
- Past members: Edgars Krūmiņš ("Mazais"); Imants Vovers; Rihards Skudrītis; Kaspars Bārbals; Mārtiņš Pētersons; Ģirts Kļaviņš; Egons Kronbergs; Artūrs Jurjāns
- Website: www.skyforger.lv/

Skyforger is a metal band from Latvia formed in 1995.

== History ==
Skyforger succeeded doom metal band Grindmaster Dead. Most of their songs are about Baltic mythology and warfare. They also play Latvian folk songs and their metal arrangements. Although Skyforger is known for folk metal, the style on their demo Semigalls' Warchant is black metal. The band has performed and recorded a number of folk songs, including their acoustic fourth album, Zobena Dziesma, released in 2003.

In 2010, Skyforger signed with Metal Blade Records and released their fifth studio album, Kurbads, about mythical Latvian warrior Kurbads, son of mare. The album received the 2010 Annual Latvian Music Recording Award for best rock album, as well as the 2010 Latvian Metal Music Award for best metal album. Skyforger also won "Best Metal Band". Skyforger was featured on BBC's series "Close-Up" episode on Latvian folk music.

In 2015, the band released their sixth album, Senprūsija, which they dedicated to the extinct Baltic people Old Prussians. Two of the album's songs are sung in Old Prussian (Ei skīja, skīja and Rāmava), while the rest are in Latvian. To write the album, Skyforger recruited historical consultant Agris Dzenis. After releasing the album, the band went on an European tour on April 8. In 2016, Senprūsija received the Annual Latvian Music Recording Award for best hard rock/heavy metal album of 2015. In 2016, Skyforger re-issued their 2003 album Zobena dziesma with two bonus tracks.

On June 3, 2017, Skyforger performed a one-time multi-media concert – metal opera "Kurbads. The Son of The Mare" – at Lielezers open-air stage in Limbaži as a part of a programme for 100th Anniversary of the Latvian Republic. On February 14, 2018, the performance won the Kilogram of Culture award for "Surprise of the Year". On June 17, 2018, Skyforger played a special concert at the festival Zobens un Lemess, commemorating the 20th anniversary of their first album, Kauja pie Saules, in 1998. On 18 November 2018, the centenary of the proclamation of Latvia, Skyforger released a Kristīne Neikena-directed video starring actress Maija Arvena Ozoliņa for their song Nekas nav aizmirsts from album Senprūsija.

== Controversy ==
Skyforger was involved in some controversy with one of their former producers who believed they were affiliated with Neo-Nazism. The reason for this was the cover of their album Pērkoņkalve, which depicts Baltic god of thunder Pērkons wearing a belt buckle adorned with a swastika and striking an anvil, as well as the swastika incorporated in Skyforger's logo. Some websites had therefore listed Skyforger as a Neo-Nazi band. The band addressed the controversy on their website, writing:

Skyforger has never been interested in any kind of national-socialistic ideology. Also not in any other ideologies whatsoever. All album themes and lyrics simply display pure Latvian pagan art and symbols, which have been used for thousands of years. (..) To our people, the swastika (or as called here - Thundercross) was a sign of the pagan god of Thunder, and it gives protection against evil things. On the first two album sleeves we even included labels which read "No Nazi stuff here" to avoid misunderstanding, and prevent false interpretation of the symbol. The Thundercross existed long before the NS regime of 1930s. Sadly, it seems that there is still prejudices against the symbol alive today; therefore Skyforger has removed the symbol from the logo permanently.

— Skyforger,

== Members ==
Current members

- Pēteris Kvetkovskis ("Peter") – lead vocals, guitar, kokles, stabule (1995–present)
- Edgars Grabovskis ("Zirgs") – bass guitar, backing vocals, ģīga (1995–present)
- Alvis Bernāns – guitar (2014–present)
- Jānis Osis – drums, percussion (2022–present)

Live/session members

- Edgars Zilberts – kokles (2017 – present)
- Geoffroy Dell’Aria – bagpipes, flutes, jaw harp (2019 – present)

Former members

- Imants Vovers – drums, backing vocals (1995–1998)
- Rihards Skudrītis – guitar, backing vocals (1996–2000, 2001–2004, 2006–2008)
- Edgars Krūmiņš ("Mazais") – drums, percussion (1998–2015)
- Kaspars Bārbals – dūdas, kokles, backing vocals (2004–2012)
- Mārtiņš Pētersons – guitar, backing vocals (2000–2001, 2008–2010)
- Ģirts Kļaviņš ("Motors") – guitar, backing vocals (2004–2006)
- Egons Kronbergs – guitar (2010–2013)
- Artūrs Jurjāns – drums, percussion (2016–2022)

== Gallery ==
Band members at the Dark Troll Festival 2026

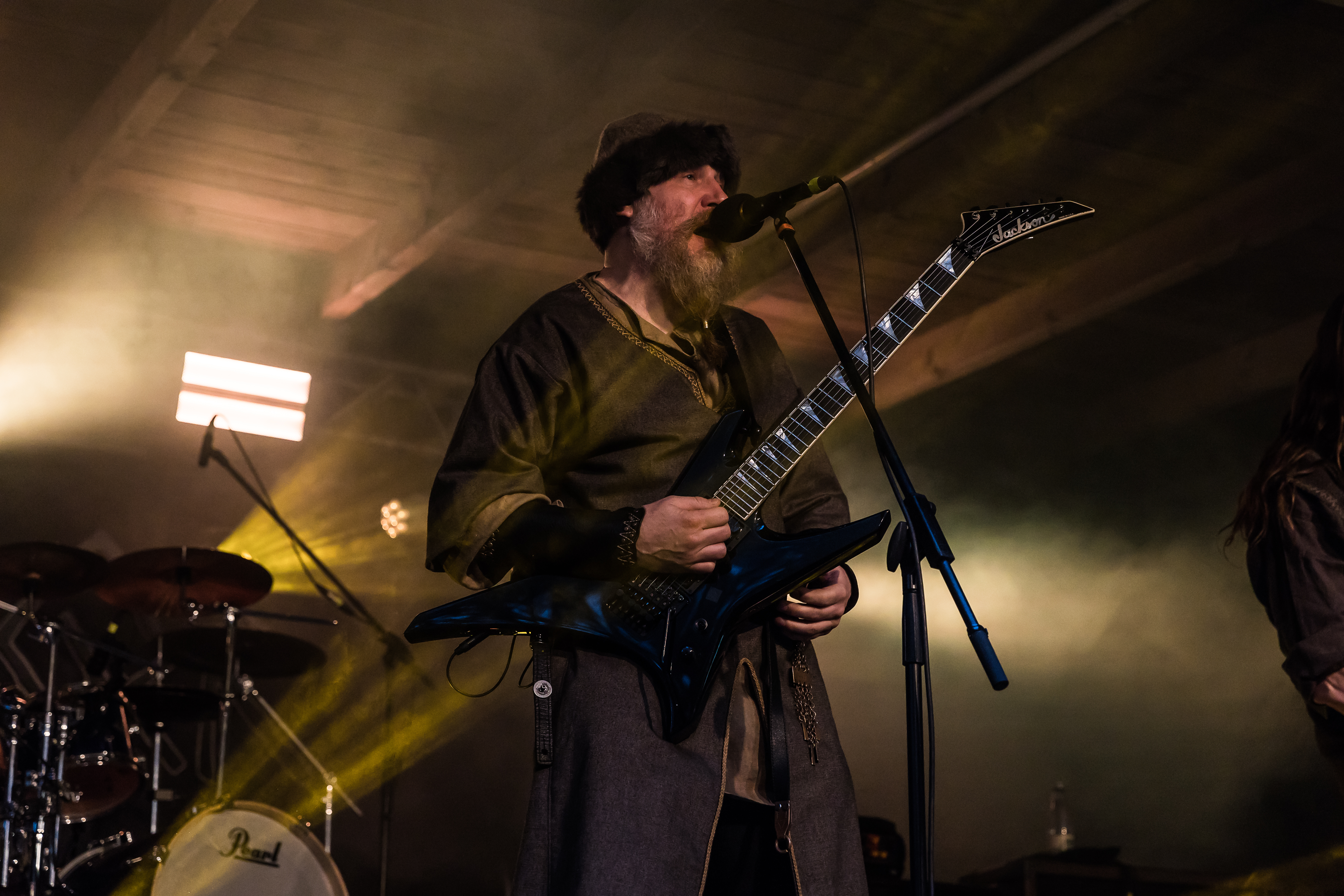
Singer and guitarist Pēteris

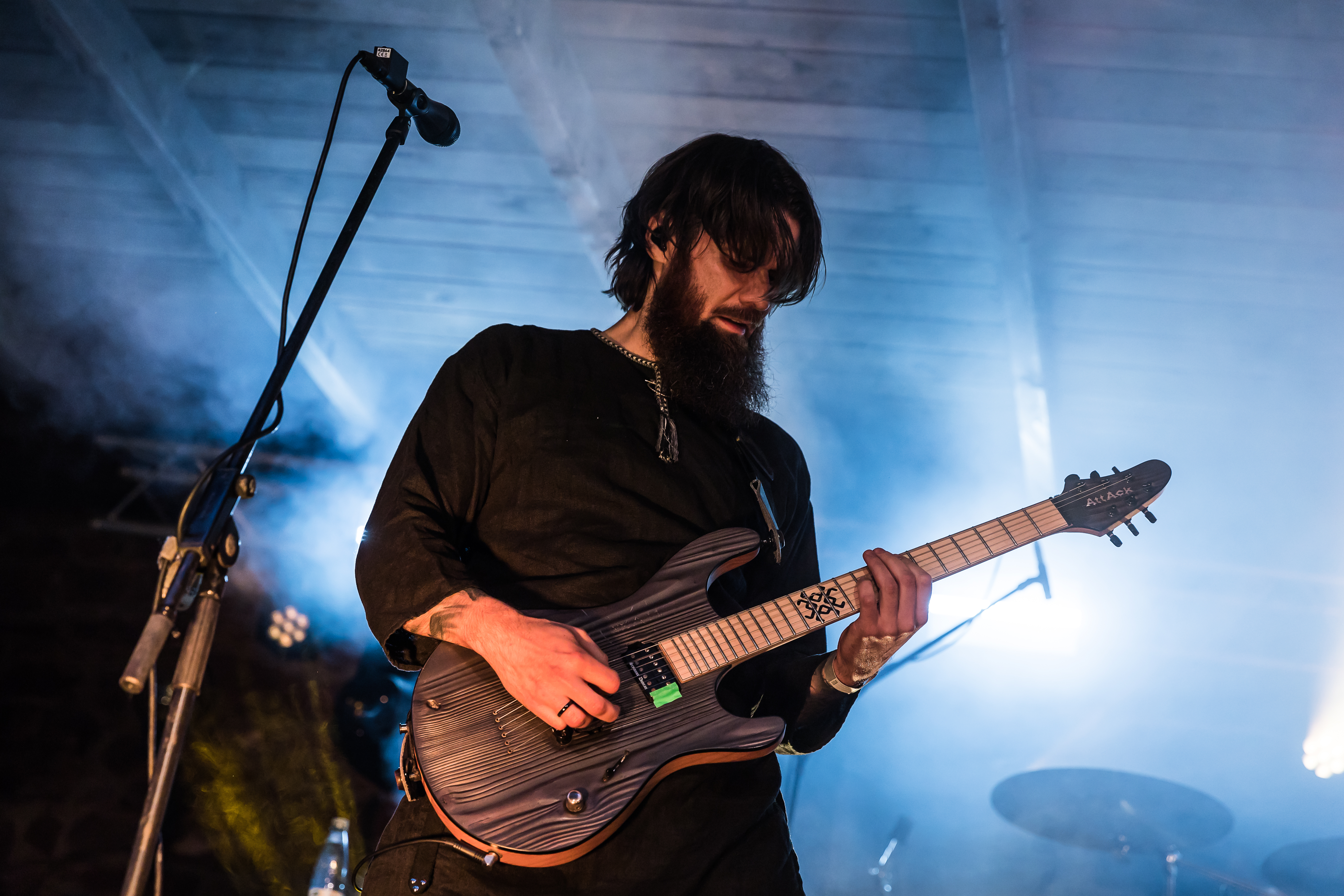
Guitarist Alvis

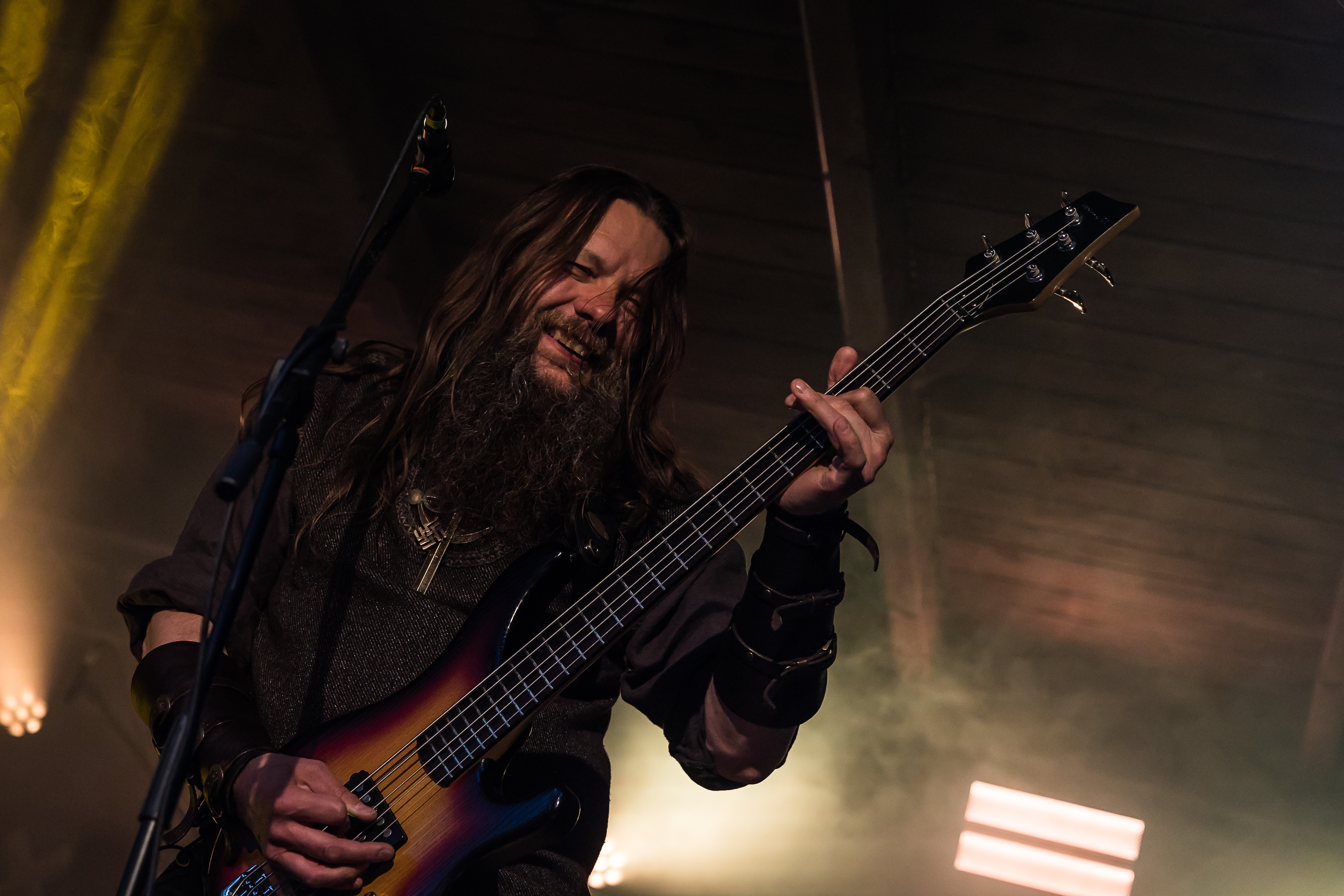
Bass player Edgars „Zirgs“

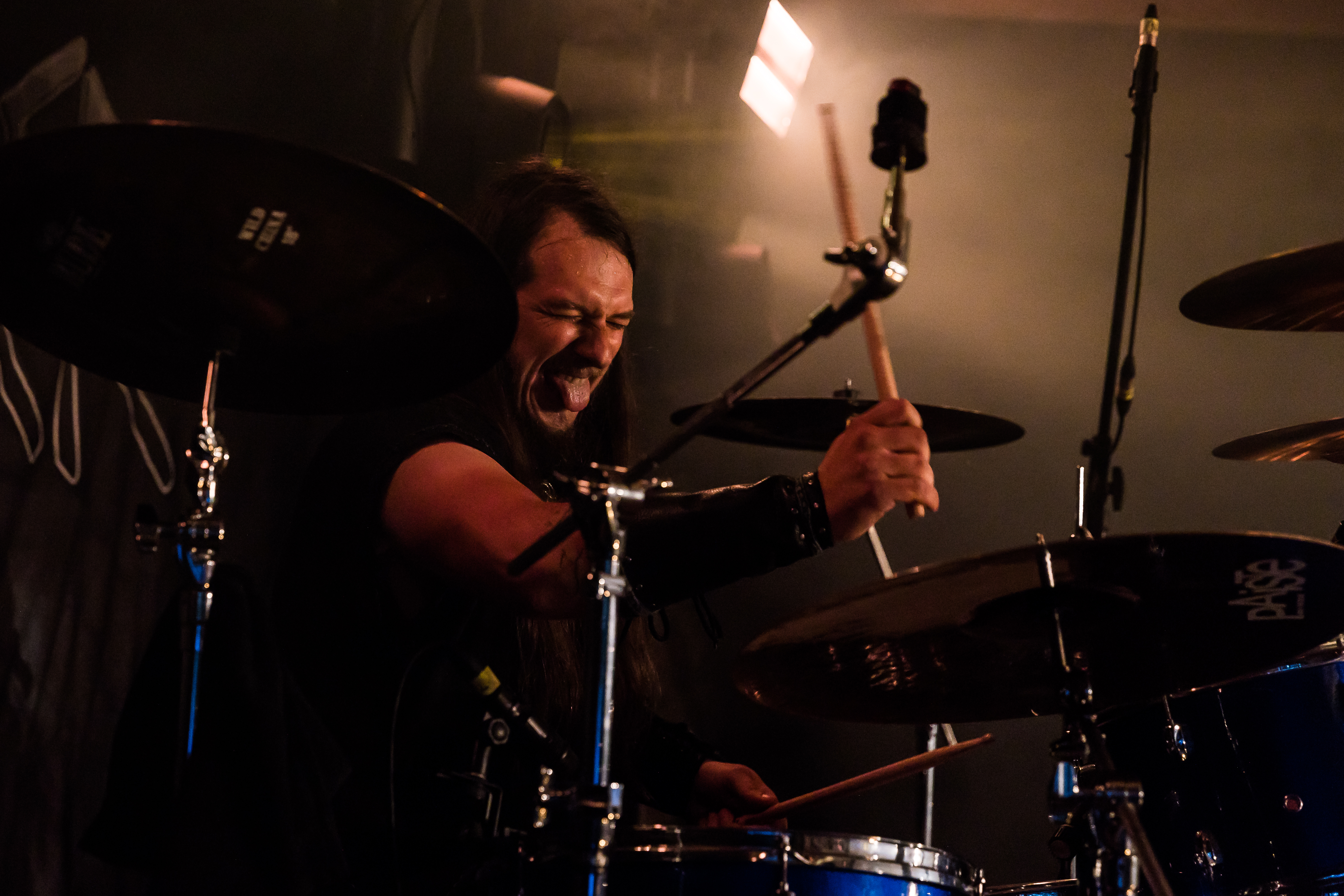
Drummer Jānis

== Discography ==
- Semigalls' Warchant (1997; demo)
- Kauja pie Saules (1998)
- Latviešu strēlnieki (2000)
- Pērkoņkalve (Thunderforge) (2003)
- Zobena Dziesma (2003; acoustic album)
- Semigalls' Warchant (2005; expanded re-release)
- Zobena Dziesma (2006; expanded re-release)
- Kurbads (2010)
- Senprūsija (2015)
- Senprūsija Live (2015; live album)
- Teikas (Folktales) (2025)
