= Pērkoņkalve =

2003 album by Skyforger

Studio album by Skyforger
- Released: 1 June 2003
- Recorded: 2002–2003
- Studio: Phoenix Studios
- Genre: Folk metal
- Length: 50:42
- Label: Folter Records
- Producer: Gints Lundbergs

Skyforger chronology
Latviešu Strēlnieki (1999)	Pērkoņkalve (2003)	Zobena Dziesma (2003)

Pērkoņkalve (lit. 'Thunderforge') is Skyforger's third full-length album. It was recorded and mixed from late 2002 to early 2003 at the Phoenix Studios and released on 1 June 2003 by Folter Records. The official presentation of the album took place on 21 September 2003 at the festival Baltijas Saule (Baltic Sun) in Riga.

In a 2006 interview, frontman Pēteris Kvetkovskis referred to the album as the band's Reign In Blood, i.e. Skyforger's best work, but also expressed hope the band's best album is yet to come. He also recalled an incident when a factory refused to press another batch of CDs after its boss saw the swastika in both the album's cover art and band's logo (see Skyforger#Controversy).

In 2009 Folter Records released a red 12" vinyl edition of the album limited to 500 copies.

== Musical style and lyrical themes ==
Pērkoņkalve indicates a departure from the war themes (Battle of Saule, Latvian War of Independence, and Latvian Riflemen) covered by the band's previous albums. It is a concept album about Latvian mythology with the Latvian god of thunder Pērkons depicted on the cover, striking an anvil with his hammer. Pērkoņkalve goes through the ancient Latvian year and starts with a song about the arrival of spring god Ūsiņš.

Musically, the album is slower, doomier and less aggressive than Skyforger's previous works and features a more extensive of various Latvian folk musical instruments, folk melodies, and folk lyrics. It was also the first the band utilized a synthesizer.

Professional ratings
Review scores
Source	Rating
Sputnikmusic	4/5 stars
The Metal Observer	9.5/10 stars
The Metal Crypt	5/5 stars
Chronicles of Chaos	9/10 stars
Maelstrom	8/10 stars
Metal1.info	8.5/10 stars
Metal News	6/7 stars

== Track listing ==
English translated titles in italics.

1. "Intro" - 00:34
2. "Kad Ūsiņš jāj" (When Usins Rides) – 4:57
3. "Gada īsākā nakts" (The Shortest Night of the Year) – 5:48
4. "Nakts debesu karakungs" (Warlord of the Night Sky) – 5:34
5. "Garais dancis" (Long Dance) – 4:13
6. "Pērkoņkalve" (Thunderforge) – 4:47
7. "Migla migla, rasa rasa (svētās vedības)" (Oh Fog, Oh Dew) – 7:04
8. "Čūsku sieviete" (The Woman of Serpents) – 6:55
9. "Caur aizsaules vārtiem" (Through the Gates of the World Beyond) – 5:02
10. "Tumsā un salā" (In Darkness and Frost) – 5:48

== Personnel ==
Skyforger

- Pēteris Kvetkovskis – lead vocals, electric guitar, stabule, kokle, design
- Edgars Grabovskis – bass guitar, vocals, ģīga, Jew's harp
- Rihards Skudrītis – electric guitar, additional vocals, kokle, acoustic guitar, keyboards
- Edgars Krūmiņš – thunderdrums, percussion

Production

- Gints Lundbergs – producer, mixing
- Virsaitis – cover and painting
- Aiva Krūmiņa – painting
- Valdis Bērzvads – layout, design
- Ieva Zemīte – photography
- Ilze Apine – photography
- Andis "Hopkinss" Toms – English translation
