= Mirta =

Mirta is a female given name which may refer to:

- Mirta Aguirre (1912–1980), Cuban poet, novelist, journalist and political activist
- Mirta Busnelli (born 1946), Argentine actress
- Mirta Diaz-Balart (born 1928), first wife of Fidel Castro
- Mirta Galesic, Croatian American psychologist
- Mirta Hortas (1949–2022), Argentine writer
- Mirta Miller (born 1948), Argentine actress
- Mirta Ojito (born 1964), Cuban-American newspaper reporter
- Mirta de Perales (1922–2011), Cuban-American beauty business entrepreneur and cosmetologist
- Mirta Roses Periago, Argentine epidemiologist
- Mirta, a character in Winx Club
