= Sierra Morena (disambiguation) =

There are a number of places named Sierra Morena. These include:

- Sierra Morena, a mountain range in Spain;
- Sierra Morena, Cuba, a barrio and a village in Cuba;
- Sierra Morena, California, a summit in the Santa Cruz Mountains;
- that portion of the Santa Cruz Mountains running from Half Moon Bay Road in the north to Lexington Reservoir in the south.
