= Kind of Glue =

2001 album by Satellites LV

Studio album by Satellites LV
- Released: December 14, 2001
- Genre: Experimental; Britpop; Indie rock Electronica
- Length: 23:46
- Label: Self released
- Producer: Satellites LV

Satellites LV chronology
Piens (1998)	Kind of Glue (2001)

Kind of Glue is the second album by Satellites LV, released in 2001.

"Kind of Glue" features many guest musicians including legendary Latvian trumpeter Gunārs Rozenbergs and drummer Haralds Bondaris. The album received critical acclaim in Latvia and was also played in several radio stations in Europe (VPRO – "Night Train" (Holland), Studio Brussels. Recording is considered to be the first ever published post-rock album in Latvia. The album cover features a drawing "Blue Screens" by Edgars Žilde.

== Track listing ==
1. "I Hope It's Gonna Snow on Christmas Eve" – 0:42
2. "Surfing'" – 4:25
3. "Kansas" – 2:37
4. "Japanese Golfers" – 2:30
5. "I'm Afraid of the Food They're Selling" – 2:47
6. "Hospital People" – 1:35
7. "Kind of Glue" – 5:33
8. "Cleveland" – 1:46
9. "I Wish I Was a Beach Boy" – 1:51

== Band members ==
- Jānis Žilde (guitars, vocals)
- Edgars Žilde (guitars, vocals, piano)
- Toms Ostrovskis (bass)

== Guest musicians ==
- Gunars Rozenbergs (trumpet)
- Janis Volkmanis (trumpet)
- Mikus Solovejs (saxophone)
- Tina Ostrovska (percussion, xylophone, violin)
- Haralds Bondaris (drums)
