= Mirta de Perales =

Cuban businesswoman (1922–2011)

Mirta de Perales (September 2, 1922 – May 3, 2011), born Mirta Raya Casanova in Rancho Veloz, Las Villas Province, Cuba was a hairdresser, cosmetologist and businesswoman. She owned an eponymous brand, Mirta de Perales beauty care products.

== Death ==
She died on May 3, 2011.
