= Tumsa =

Tumsa is a surname. Notable people with the surname include:

- Baro Tumsa (1938–1978), Oromo pharmacist
- Gudina Tumsa (1929–1979), Ethiopian theologian

== See also ==
- Tumsa Nahin Dekha
