= Corralillo =

- Municipality
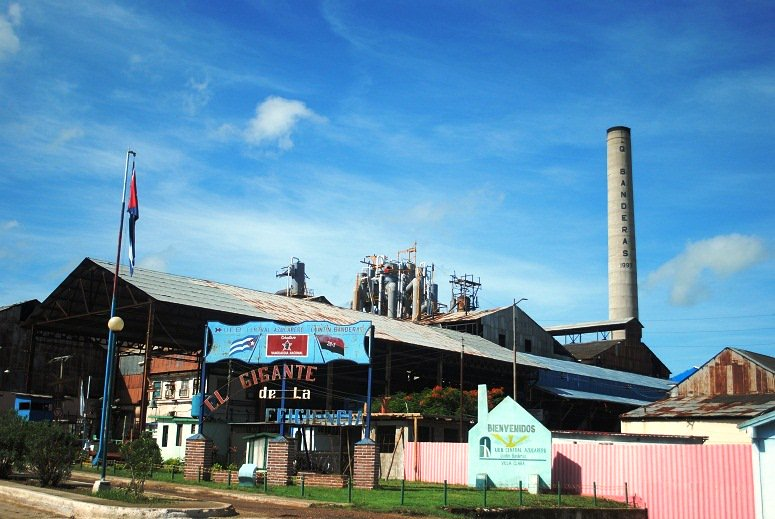
- Sugar mill Quintin Banderas, located in the municipality

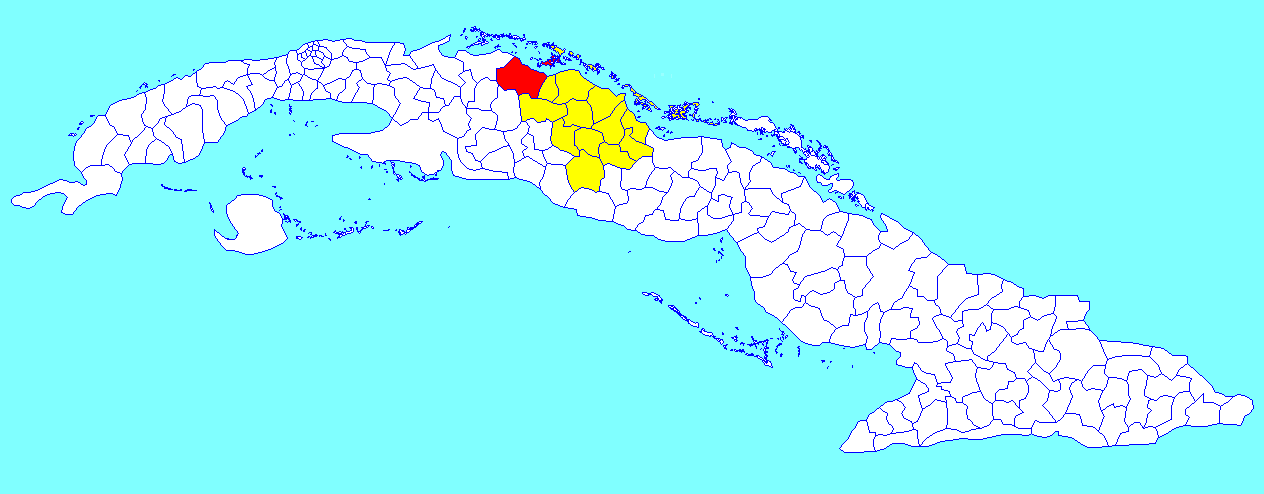
- Corralillo municipality (red) within Villa Clara Province (yellow) and Cuba
- Coordinates: 22°59′8″N 80°34′59″W
- Country: Cuba
- Province: Villa Clara
- Founded: 1831
- Established: 1879 (Municipality)

Area
  - Total: 843 km^{2} (325 sq mi)
- Elevation: 15 m (49 ft)

Population (2022)
  - Total: 24,791
  - Density: 29.4/km^{2} (76.2/sq mi)
- Time zone: UTC-5 (EST)
- Area code: +53-42

Corralillo is a municipality and town in the Villa Clara Province of Cuba. It was founded in 1831 and established as a municipality in 1879.

== Geography ==
Corralillo is located on the northern coast of Cuba, in the north-western corner of the Villa Clara province, bordering the Matanzas Province to the west and the Bay of Cadiz to the north. The cays of Falcones, Blanquizal and Verde of the Sabana-Camagüey Archipelago as well as a multitude of reefs are located at sea north of Corralillo.

The municipality is divided into the consejos populares (mainly villages) of Ceja de Pablo, Corralillo (municipal seat), Palma Sola, Perú, Rancho Veloz, Sabana Grande, Santa María and Sierra Morena.

== Demographics ==
In 2022, the municipality of Corralillo had a population of 24,791. With a total area of 843 km^{2} (325 sq mi), it has a population density of 29/km^{2} (75/sq mi).

== Institutions ==
- Library "Rafael Izquierdo Triana"
- Cultural center “Leopoldo Romañach”
- Movie theater Jigüe
- Municipal Directorate of Culture of Corralillo
- Bookstore “Esperanza Ruiz”
- Corralillo Municipal Museum

== See also ==
- Municipalities of Cuba
- List of cities in Cuba
