= Piens =

1998 album by Satellites LV

Studio album by The Satellites
- Released: 1998
- Genre: Experimental; Britpop; Indie rock Electronica
- Length: 43:50
- Label: Self released
- Producer: The Satellites

The Satellites chronology
Piens (1998)	Kind of Glue (2001)

Piens (lit. 'milk') is the debut album by Latvian band The Satellites, released in 1998.

The debut single "Nekad, nekad" received Power Play rotation on Latvia's most popular radio stations in the spring of 1997. Their videos "Nekad, nekad", "Disko", "Happy to Follow" and "I Wish I Was a Beach Boy" were shown frequently on TV as well.

== Track listing ==
1. "Nekad, nekad" – 4:12
2. "Lai paliek ta ka ir" – 3:41
3. "Publiska vieta" – 6:10
4. "Es domaju, ka mirstu" – 3:23
5. "Happy to Follow" – 5:31
6. "Piens" – 3:23
7. "Baseins" – 3:55
8. "Disko" – 4:28
9. "Intro 2:L.Kresls" – 2:57
10. "Viss mainisies" – 6:04

== Band members ==
- Janis Zilde (guitar, vocals)
- Edgars Zilde (guitar, vocals, piano)
- Toms Ostrovskis (bass)
- Uldis Zarins (drums)
