= Giga (instrument) =

Type of bowed lyre

The giga was a type of bowed lyre that was very popular, especially in Norway, but also common in England, Iceland and Denmark. It is considered to be extinct; however, there are some reconstruction projects. The name does not originate from Latin, but rather derives from an Old Norse word meaning "to vibrate", "to move in a fast way". This term is also the origin of the name of the dance called Jig, which is very common in Northern Europe, especially in the UK and Ireland.

== Sources ==
- Otto Emanuel Andersson. The Shetland Gue, the Welsh Crwth, and the Northern Bowed Harp. Offprint from the Budkavlen 1954, nos. 1–4. Åbo: s.n., 1956

== See also ==
- Ģīga
