= Valdis Muktupāvels =

Latvian composer and ethnomusicologist

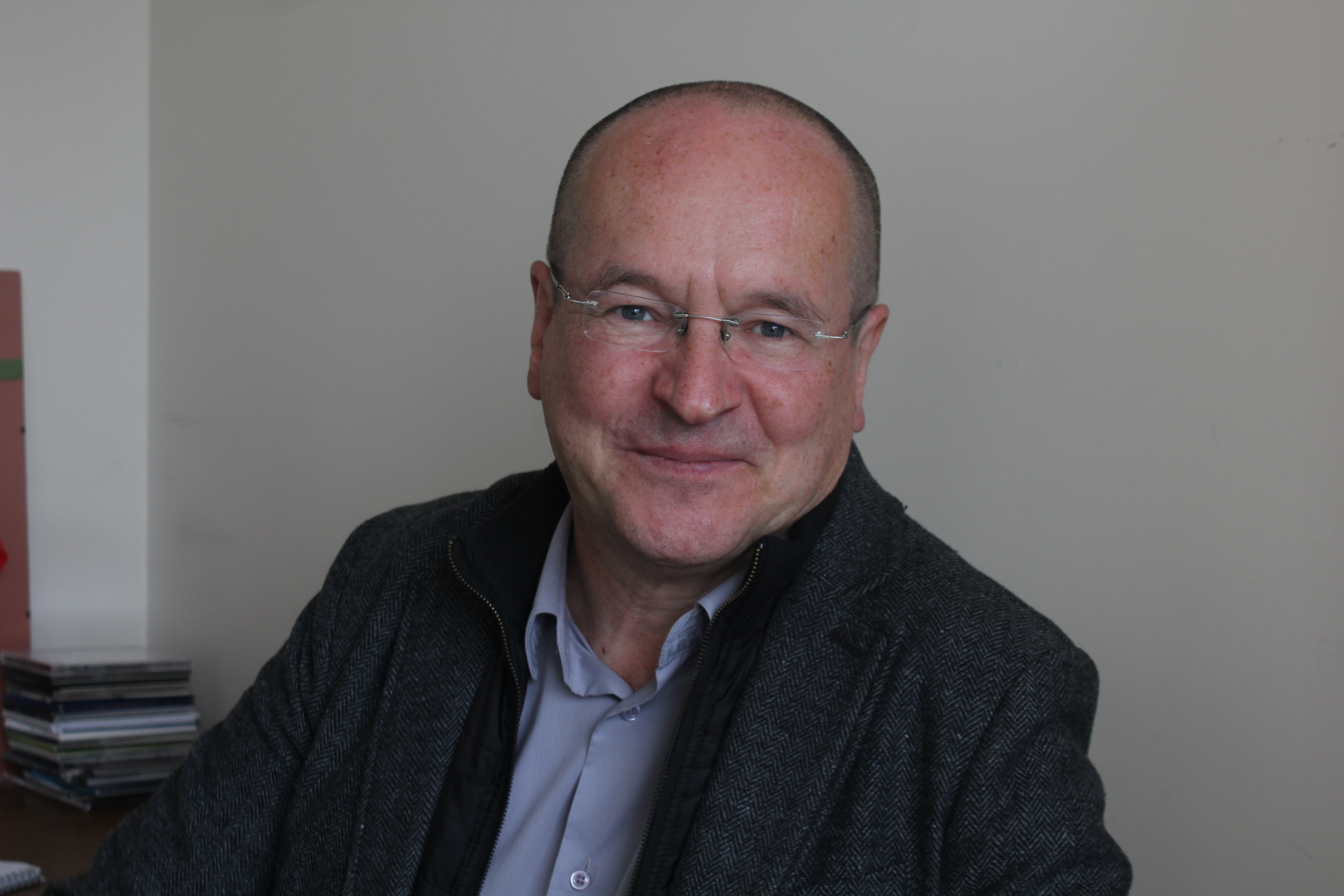
Valdis Muktupāvels in 2017

Valdis Muktupāvels (9 November 1958 in Līvāni) is a Latvian ethnomusicologist, composer, musician, teacher and doctor of art criticism.

Muktupāvels graduated 1980 from the University of Latvia and acquired a specialty in chemistry in 1983. He completed the Jāzeps Vītols Latvian Academy of Music in 1996 with a doctorate in art criticism. Muktupāvels has worked for the University of Latvia since 1989; since 1999 at the Art History and Philology Faculty, and since 2002 as a professor.

Muktupāvels has been a member of the Latvian National Cultural Council since 2002. He is a pioneer in the revival of traditional instruments in Latvia, and has performed in many countries in Europe, North America, and countries like Australia, India and Japan. He was also the founder and director of the folklore ensemble Rasa, which was active from 1988 to 1998.

Muktupāvels is a Magnus Ducatus Poesis participant.

Muktupāvels was awarded the Knight's Cross of the Order of the Lithuanian Grand Duke Gediminas in 2001. He is president of the AKKA/LAA (Copyright and Communication Consulting Agency/Latvian Authors Association) since 2013.

In 2010 culture management center Lauska released Muktupāvels' bilingual book in Latvian and English titled "Kokles un koklēšana Latvijā/The Baltic Psaltery and Playing Traditions in Latvia" that also included a CD with kokles tunings, exercises and repertoire.

In late 2019, Muktupāvels toured the United States and Canada together with his wife, performing various traditional songs from different historical Baltic regions (Curonia, Vidzeme, Latgale, Zemgale, Selonia, Lithuania, Prussia and Yotvingia) with musical instruments such as kokles, Jew's harp, guitar and dūdas.

His spouse is Rūta Muktupāvela.
