= Tumsa Nahin Dekha =

Tumsa Nahin Dekha (lit. 'Never Seen Someone Like You') may refer to:

- Tumsa Nahin Dekha (1957 film), an Indian Hindi-language film
  - "Tumsa Nahin Dekha", the title track of the film by Mohammed Rafi
- Tumsa Nahin Dekha: A Love Story, a 2004 Indian Hindi-language romantic drama film
