= Sierra Morena, Cuba =

Sierra Morena
- Village
- Location of Sierra Morena in Cuba
- Coordinates: 22°57′N 80°31′W
- Country: Cuba
- Province: Villa Clara
- Municipality: Corralillo

Population (2012)
  - Total: 2,429
- Time zone: UTC-5 (EST)
- Postal code: 54120
- Area code: +53-42682

Sierra Morena (English translation: Brown Mountain Range) is a Cuban village and consejo popular (people's council) of the municipality of Corralillo, Villa Clara Province.

== See also ==
- Rancho Veloz
