= Rancho Veloz =

- Little Town
- Coat of arms

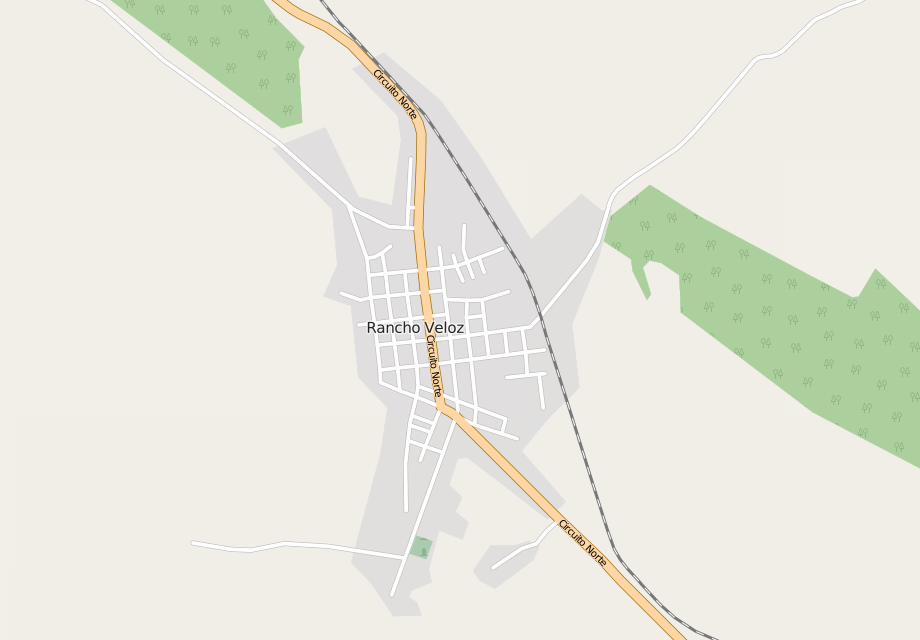
- OSM map of Rancho Veloz

- Location of Rancho Veloz in Cuba
- Coordinates: 22°53′00″N 80°23′00″W
- Country: Cuba
- Province: Villa Clara
- Municipality: Corralillo
- Founded: 1835
- Elevation El Vigía: 150 m (490 ft)

Population
  - Total: 6,320
- 2023 families
- Time zone: UTC-5 (EST)
- Zip code: 54110
- Area code: +53-42

Rancho Veloz is a Cuban town and consejo popular ("people's council", i.e. hamlet) of the municipality of Corralillo, in Villa Clara Province. It is a small town whose population numbers between 4,549 (officially) and 6,320.

== History ==
The evolution and development of Rancho Veloz is very similar to that of other towns on the island, especially those that emerged in the urban context of the first half of the 19th century. We must look back to the land distributions, when people arrived from Navarre, Asturias, Santander, and the Canary Islands, to glimpse the founding moment. When the lands were distributed, a type of agrarian entity called a "realengo" emerged. These constituted tracts of land that were not dedicated to any productive activity, as was the case in 1770 with the Las Cañas realengo, when the first settlers settled in this area.

The search for precious woods was the reason these first settlers settled. The forests were cut down, and the lands were used for cattle raising. The local conditions (water, proximity to the coast) favored the contraband trade, increasing the boom and development of the area.

In 1835, the Las Cañas royal estate was divided into three corrals, one of which was named Santa Fe de las Pozas. Nearby, a man named Veloz settled, building a ranch that served as a store and supplied the neighbors, and the settlers began to gather at Veloz's ranch.

Around Veloz's store, other ranches were built until a hamlet formed. The official date of its founding is March 19, 1835. Santa Fe de las Pozas was the seat of the district where the administrative and social government was established, belonging to the captaincy of Álvarez until 1843.

The 1940s and 1950s saw notable changes in the economic, political, and social structure of the territory where the population center of Rancho Veloz emerged and developed. Economically, the sugar industry was of great importance, beginning to develop and becoming the area's greatest source of wealth, attracting capital from Matanzas and Havana, which was invested in the industry.

In the second half of the 19th century, characterized by a sugar boom, up to twelve sugar mills emerged, the largest in the entire region being Ramona, built in 1857. The names of the remaining sugar mills and sugar mills were Santa Fe, Santa Roque, San Pedro, Urrutia, San Vicente, Caridad, Mallorquín, Crimea, Tartecio, and Cuatro Caminos. In the first decade of the 20th century, many of them were deactivated, until in 1921 only Ramona remained, which in 1933 incorporated a sugar refinery.

Returning to the 19th century, we note that the abolition of slavery came late in the area. The last slaves were registered in 1879. The 1862 census declared a population of 1,297 whites; 221 free slaves; and 3,721 slaves.

On January 1, 1879, the City Council was created, and its first mayor was José Suárez Solís. The municipality then fell under the jurisdiction of Sagua la Grande, consolidating its economic, political, and social powers. Regarding the administrative order, on June 9, 1979, by virtue of the Royal Order of King Alfonso XII, the island of Cuba was divided into six provinces of Las Villas, which in turn included 28 municipal areas, including the municipality of Rancho Veloz, whose city council was established, as previously mentioned, on January 1, 1879.

In 1885, the Municipal Court was created, and at this time, the population was predominantly Spanish and their direct descendants. The 1887 census indicated a population growth of 1,141 inhabitants compared to the previous census.

Records of the first schools in the town date back to 1888. The girls-only school was located on Real Street (now Céspedes Street). The teacher was Francisca Silverio and her assistant Clara Aruca. At the same time, there was another school for boys across the street, with José Miel as its teacher.

This hilly town has a fort on the so-called Loma El Vigía, which is 150 meters above sea level, built in 1869 as a watchtower to protect it from attacks by corsairs and pirates, and later as a means of defense during the wars of independence. It appears on the town's coat of arms and is a symbol of identity for the Ranchovelozano people. Due to its deterioration, the current school, similar to the original, was built in 1936.

In 1948, when Mr. Fernando Gomes Acosta was mayor, Father José Novo Vásquez blessed the expansion of the park around the temple, thanks to his donation of unpaved parish land. On December 17, 1949, during the mayoralty of Mr. Fernando Gómez Acosta, the Municipal Council agreed to celebrate every March 19, the feast of the town's patron saint, the day of the Absent Ranchovelozano. That day in December was also declared a municipal holiday for the consecration of the Masonic Temple.

== Geography ==
After the political-administrative division in 1976 we are a rectangle bordered to the north by the Atlantic Ocean, to the south by the Santo Domingo - Corralillo highway, to the east is Carahatas de Quemado de Güines, the council of Quintín Banderas and the Cayamas area and to the west the popular council La Panchita. The settlements of Tartércio and Crimea are rural areas of the Popular Council of Renacho Veloz as well as Camacho.

== Population ==
The population is 6,320, with 2,023 families living there. The majority of the population is white at 41%, black at 30%, and the remainder is mixed-race.

== Rocks ==
The predominant rocks are limestone, which gives rise to the dogtooth rock formations and the topography. It is worth noting that part of the territory has sedimentary rocks with a high percentage of clay, especially the Valle de Reyes and the Gómez area, where high-quality clay is found.

== Relief ==
We live in an intermountain valley surrounded by high peaks, where the 150m high El Vigía Hill stands out, as does the San José Hill.

== Climate ==
The climate is tropical, humid, and drought-prone due to the influence of anticyclones.

== Rainfall ==
Rainfall is scarce, predominating in the months of June and October.

== Rivers ==
The most important river is the Biajaca River. It is intermittent because it flows during the rainy season, acquiring different tributaries depending on the area through which it flows. These are Charco Civil, Las Mujeres, Charcón, and Crimea.

== Soils ==
They are productive in the flat areas. There are meadows in the valleys of Santa Clara, Tartércio, and Santa Lucia.

== Plants ==
To the north, vegetation is dominated by mangroves and Jordan plants, such as marabou.

== Animals ==
Cows, sheep, pigs, poultry, and horses predominate, and the Güineito, a mollusk that inhabits the San José area, is native to the area.

== The Coat of Arms ==
Mr. Ramón López Céspedes, a native of Rancho Veloz and a teacher for many years in his hometown, designed the coat of arms and founded the Public Library with Mr. José Alfredo Ibáñez, also an educator.

The Cross: The coat of arms symbolizes the original name of Rancho Veloz, which was Santa Fe de las Pozas.

The Fort: Represents the one built on El Vigía Hill before 1869. The current fort, smaller than the original, was built on the same platform in 1936.

The Ranch: Recalls Mr. Veloz, where a grocery store was established for passersby and residents of the surrounding area.

La Palma: It commemorates one of the five branches that existed in the Santa Isabel Estate, property of Mr. Antonio Sánchez Pérez and that was felled by the cyclone of 1892. The palm tree was admired by all who saw it and they left their signature on its trunks.

== The Patron Saint ==
The town's patron saint is Saint Joseph, whose feast day is celebrated on March 19th, chosen since 1949 to celebrate the day of the Absent Ranchovelozano. We find his life in the verses of the Gospels of the Infancy of Jesus, reported by Saint Matthew and Saint Luke.

The Possession: One of the town's oldest traditions is the possession in honor of Saint Joseph, which paraded through the streets of the town every March 19th. March 1960 was the last time the image paraded through the town's streets in the 20th century. 43 years later, in 2003, this celebration of faith resumed at 8:00 a.m. amidst a town that, with silence and discipline, participated in giving thanks for the recovery of one of its oldest traditions in the 21st century. At all four stops, we prayed to the Lord, asking for the intercession of St. Joseph for families, young people, the people, the absent, and for the permanence among us of two Dominican Sisters of Fatima.

== Health ==
A modern healthcare system has developed through a battle of ideas. It includes a comprehensive teaching polyclinic, where most specialties are treated with high-tech equipment, a rehabilitation room, a pharmacy, a maternity home, and five clinics, currently operating thanks to the charitable aid provided by healthcare workers to neighboring countries in need.

== Education ==
The town has benefited greatly from educational advances.

On September 19, 1951, the municipality was declared a territory free of illiteracy.

In 1960, the José de la Luz y Caballero urban school and rural schools were built in the bateyes of Reyes, Crimen, El Cedro, La Majagua, Tartesio, and Camacho. Secondary education began with the Bartolomé Masó school, which was located in various locations until the new building was built.

Worker-peasant education began, and later the Camilo Cienfuegos FOC (F.O.C.) school.

There is a special school, "Lázaro Villavicencio," for students with special needs.

All schools are equipped with televisions, video equipment, and computers.

This school year, with the new changes in education, a coeducational school was inaugurated, serving students from various pre-university programs, including business and gastronomy, agronomy, and pre-pedagogy.

== Sports ==
Sports are highly developed. Several sports are practiced with very satisfactory results, and there are sufficient physical education coaches and teachers. Through community efforts, a chess academy was established for the enjoyment of the town. Satisfactory results have been achieved in the national sports competitions. All sports are taught from elementary school onward, with teachers and specialists.

== Culture ==
The town held numerous festivals, including open-air dances, the Flower Dance, and parades. The Flower Dance has been revived from these festivals.

In 1950, the Day of Ranchovelozano was celebrated for the first time. These festivities took their cue from the town's patron saint, Saint Joseph.

Currently, we have a cultural complex that offers a variety of recreational activities for the enjoyment of the town. We also have the dance group Explosión Morena, which has won important awards at the dance festival, with the figure of Antonio Guzmán (Singer) and his group Poder Latino, and a large group of Art Instructors.

== Estampas Event ==
The José Alfredo Ibáñez Library in Rancho Veloz puts into practice the expression of Claudia Lux, president of the International Federation of Librarians, who recently urged the institution to be involved in all aspects of life for the Estampas event.

It is a challenge to capture aspects of the general culture that have shaped the life of Rancho Veloz. It also highlights events, customs, curiosities, personalities, and figures whose significance or sympathy have left their mark on the history and sentiment of this town.

The main objectives are to contribute to enhancing the sense of belonging to the community and the neighborhood by keeping alive memories and significant experiences, to provide an interactive space for people interested in exploring community issues and their identity, and to ensure the inclusion of different groups in the compilation of research that addresses theoretical aspects of identity from the Ranchovelozana perspective. An urgent requirement was to gather as many testimonies as possible from illustrious individuals, thereby increasing the bibliography of references, which is insufficient at this stage of municipalization of education, where the library, more than a center that stores books, has become a source that radiates culture.

These are some of the objectives of the Estampas event, which will be dedicated to Librarian's Day and also to all those who revive the thought of Martí.

== Religion ==
The construction of the current church dates back to around 1889, and the anecdote surrounding the change made to the church's layout hinges on this fact. Whether true or false, this is a detail that arouses the curiosity of those who visit. The project was designed by surveyor Manuel Lastre Rodríguez and had Francisco Casanova and Eleuterio Enríquez, among others, as masons.

There is evidence that many men and women were concentrated in the church at the end of the 19th century, during the Weyler reconcentration, confirming that the building was already unfinished at that time. Other accounts speak of a reconstruction around 1908 and tell that women from Rancho Veloz brought some of their clothing to be cast into the foundation of the church.

Since the church was an auxiliary church to Narciso de Álvarez, it is difficult to pinpoint exactly when it ceased to be so, although the parish books record in 1904 that the Rancho Veloz Church was dedicated to Saint Joseph.

“Mrs. Juana Pascual, widow of Carreras, donated to Father Pedro Costa Pla, parish priest of the Church of San Narciso de Álvarez, items intended for the worship of the Church of San José de Rancho Veloz.”

In Rancho Veloz, the work of Father José Novo Vásquez was felt. He took charge of the parish in 1933 and founded the San Juan Bosco School around 1938. This institution did not last as long as the Padre Varela School in Quemado de Güines, but his old friends remember him for his educational work of approximately ten years.

The school opened its doors on Agramante Street and later moved to Céspedes Street. Its first teaching faculty was composed of Father Novo, Mr. Juan Blasco Veldaguer, and Mrs. Leticia and Noelia Sanz. Later, Mr. Casimiro Álvarez, Spanish by birth and later Cuban at heart, joined the school. Over time, Mr. Herminio V. Santana and Mr. Amado Rafael from neighboring Quemado de Güines arrived at the school to offer their expertise as teachers.

In 1949, the Catholic Action Girls' Youth Group was created. The initiation of the first 26 young members of the Catholic Action Youth Group took place on March 19, 1950. Magdalena Delgado Palacios served as its secretary. In September 1952, the bell tower was repaired, tiles were placed on the dome, and around this time, the clock was donated, which began the life of this town until the beginning of the 1960s.

== See also ==
- Sierra Morena
