= Dūdmaišis =

Lithuanian musical instrument

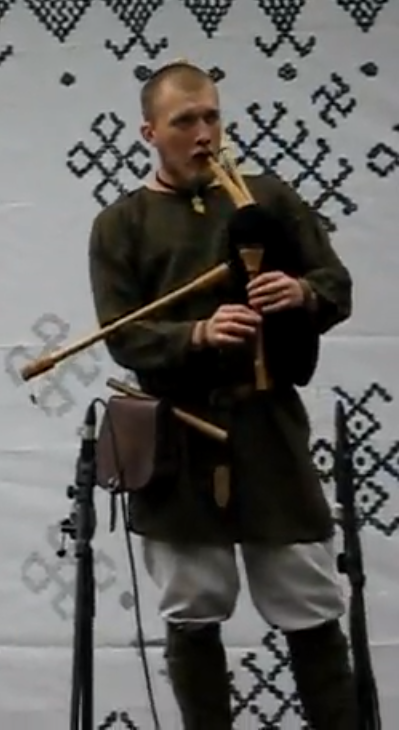
A Lithuanian bagpiper

Dūdmaišis or Labonoro dūda is a Lithuanian bagpipe with a single chanter and drone. The Lithuanian bagpipe was traditionally played at a variety of events, including May Day festivities, and spring caroling. A 1955 publication by the Lituanus Foundation noted that: "The Labanoro Dūda or Bagpipe was at one time very widely used, though it is almost forgotten."

Dūdmaišis are made of sheep, ox, goat or dogskin or of sheep’s stomachs. A blowing tube is attached to the top. On one side of the bag is a pipe with finger holes, on the other side are one or two drone pipes without fingerholes, which play at a single tone. The mouthpieces of the pipes, which have reeds made of goose quill or cane, are usually inside the bag. On the outside end are attached bent horn-shaped tips made of apple or pine wood. The bagpipes are mentioned in written sources beginning in the 16th century. It was known throughout the territory of Lithuania, but by the middle of the 20th century, it survived only near the eastern borders of Lithuania. It was played at celebrations, weddings, taverns, and markets. The bagpipes were often accompanied by fiddles, clarinets, cimbalom, basetle and drums.

== Players ==
- Lygaudė, traditional folk group
- Ugniavijas, traditional men's folk band
- Atalyja, Lithuanian folk-rock band
