= Satellites LV =

Latvian musical group

- Satellites LV, (2008).

Background information
- Origin: Riga, Latvia
- Genres: Post-rock, indie rock, experimental, electronic, progressive rock
- Years active: 1996–present
- Label: Platforma
- Members: Janis Zilde; Edgars Zilde; Toms Ostrovskis; Mareks Ameriks; Ervings Znotins
- Past members: Gunārs Rozenbergs; Jānis Volkmanis; Mikus Solovejs; Tīna Ostrovska; Haralds Bondars; Uldis Zariņš; Uldis Marhilevics
- Website: www.satellites.lv

Satellites LV, formerly known as The Satellites in their early rock period (1996–1999), is a Latvian musical group formed in 1996 in Riga, Latvia. The core members of The Satellites are brothers Janis and Edgars Zilde. Other projects and groups related to Satellites LV include Kuba, Mofo, Raadio, Autobuss Debesis, Stāvi, the experimental solo album of Janis Zilde and Augusts IV, the solo EP by Edgars Zilde.

== History ==
=== The Satellites ===
(1996–1999)

The Satellites' debut single "Nekad, nekad" received heavy rotation on Latvian radio stations in the spring of 1997. The song reached 4th position in the Radio SWH top 40. Also on popular radio station 106.2, "Nekad, nekad" held the top position for several weeks. Their self-produced videos Nekad, nekad, plus Disko and Happy to Follow were shown frequently on TV as well. The video I Wish I Was a Beach Boy, directed by Martins Grauds, was also released.

In the summer of 1997, The Satellites won the Grand Prix of Liepajas Dzintars, the biggest rock music event in the Baltic States. Soon after, the band started working on their first record.

After troubled recording and mixing sessions, their debut album, Piens, was finally finished and was released in 1998 through local label Platforma Records. The album features Uldis Marhilevics, who is known as a member of the 80' legendary Latvian band Remix.

In 1998, inspired by the Heaven's Gate religious cult suicides in 1997, the "Happy to Follow" single was released.

Janis has continued to explore different angles of persuasion and social movements in the US. Some of the ideas are again incorporated in "This Is More Than You Could Ever Hope/Move Inside" double A-side single, which was released in 1999, with a slightly different sound than its predecessors.

The Satellites music has continued to evolve into a more post-rock/experimental sound.

=== Satellites LV ===
(2000–2001)

In 2000, the band changed its name to "Satellites LV" and started working on their follow-up album, Kind of Glue. The album features legendary Latvian trumpeter Gunārs Rozenbergs, drummer Haralds Bondaris and other guest musicians. Three recorded tracks were first released on the Latvian indie music sampler Starteris Tornis Rec.. In the middle of the recording sessions, Edgars Zilde relocated to Cleveland, Ohio (in America) where he studied the following five years.

Kind of Glue was released in 2001. The album received critical acclaim in Latvia and reached No. 28 on the Latvian music charts. Songs from the album were played on several radio stations in Europe (VPRO – "Night Train" (Netherlands), from Studio Brussels). The name of the album, "Kind of Glue" is a reference to the Miles Davis legendary recording Kind of Blue.

(2005–2008)

In December 2005, after five years of absence, Edgars Zilde returned to Riga. Both brothers and Toms Ostrovskis decided to reunite Satellites LV. In the spring of 2006, musical project Kuba performed its last show and officially splits up. A radio/TV single and its video "Aukstu tēju" were soon released. In 2007, the plan was set to record Kuba's final album.

Meanwhile, Satellites LV also worked on their new material.

On July 4, 2007 "Satellites LV" was invited to open for Antony and the Johnsons in Riga Dream Factory. Unfortunately, the show was canceled at the last moment, due to Antony's medical condition.

On July 16, 2007, the band released its first radio single "Dienas Gaismas Detaļas" since its reunion. As predicted, due to sophisticated and "unusual" (for the general Latvian audience) content, the single was not included in Radio SWH daytime playlist.

Band members explained to National Latvian Radio 1:

"The new song can be viewed as a desire to show our attitude and understanding toward music as an expression of art, rather than a classic radio single in its more familiar sense. It should be perceived as a whole, one unit, and not as a commonly understood traditional musical expression (verse – bridge – chorus)."

On July 21, Satellites LV performed their first show in Liepāja (Fontaine festival). On July 27, the band performed its second concert in the Saldus festival.

On July 28, Satellites LV performed in the Salacgrīva festival PositivusAB, the same day with Stereophonics, The Concretes and James. "Right now you are the best band in the country," after the show said Uldis Rudaks, one of the most recognized Latvian music critics and journalists. Satellites LV is the only band who has played in every Positivus festival.

On September 10, radio single "Karavirini" was presented on "Radio SWH", the most popular radio station in Latvia. DJ Artis Volfs introduced Satellites LV with the words, "Latvian indie music legends..."

On September 28, the single "DGD" ("Dienas Gaismas Detaļas") reached the top position on the most popular indie radio station in Lavia, Radio Naba.

On October 11, Satellites LV performed in the capital of Lithuania, Vilnius, during the BBC DJ John Peel tribute gig "John Peel Day".

On December 1, Satellites LV opened for legendary The Wedding Present in Riga, Latvia. In January, 2008, the Satellites LV third radio single, "Pirmais" reached number 1 on the Radio SWH top 20 and stayed there for two weeks.

In 2012 Satellites LV received Best Alternative Band award at Mūzikas ierakstu gada balva.

=== Electronic instruments ===
- Yamaha DX21
- Korg MicroKorg
- Philips Philicorda Organ
- Yamaha YC-10
- Vermona Synthesizer
- Formanta drummashine

== Side projects ==
=== Kuba – 15 Episodes Of Kuba ===
(2001–2006)

In 2001, Jānis and Toms with other musicians formed a new project Kuba ("Cube") and soon after released an album 15 Episodes of Kuba which was distributed in Latvia, Japan, Greece, Russia, Taiwan, Croatia and Slovenia. . Critics compared Kuba's music with likes of Tortoise, The Sea and Cake and Herbie Hancock. The album also received two Annual Latvian Music Awards in 2002 (Best Instrumental Album of the Year and the Best Debut award).

All of the band members have had previous experience playing in other bands prior to the formation of Kuba. These were mostly post-rock music bands, as well as pop, electronic, and triphop projects. For example, Arnis was the soloist and songwriter for Dull Doll, Toms – Satellites LV and Mofo, Janis – Satellites LV and the founder of Pilots Buda, kuba's drummer Mareks founded groups Zalas Saules and Withcut, but Gonzalez – Lolitas brinumputns, T-plox, Spinners, Sirke and was the initiator of some solo projects. They decided to put some ideas together, and tried to offer a slightly different sense and take on the complexity of sound.

In 2001, they also participated in some of the major festivals in Latvia. For example: Liepajas Dzintars 2001, the Trincstock festival and Bildes 2001, opened for Macy Gray in Riga. That year, they played in almost every well-known club in Riga (Metro, Casablanca, DIZZI, Saksofons, etc.) at least twice.

Some of their musical inspirations are Herbert, Tortoise, Steve Reich, Burt Bacharach, Curtis Mayfield, Marvin Gaye, also some other postrock bands and soul music of the 60s and 70s. The name of the group itself comes from the film Cube.

Kuba provides interpretations of many themes – not to whittle away at each style's characteristic nuances, but to directly accent the finer moods, notes, and harmonies. It is possible to offer an attitude in an understandable form, not pretending to be pretentious, allowing the listener to choose for themselves their own recognizable, acceptable scale.

=== Jānis Žilde – Stavi ===
Stavi (pronounced "stah-vy") is a 2004 solo album of Janis Žilde, co-founder and the main songwriter of Satellites LV. It continued the direction started with 2001's Kind of Glue EP by Satellites LV, a diversified post-rock with jazz, ambient and pop elements.

== Current members ==
- Jānis Žilde (guitar, vocals, synth, percussions)
- Edgars Žilde (guitar, vocals, electronics, synth)
- Toms Ostrovskis (bass)
- Mareks Ameriks (drums, percussions)
- Ervings Znotiņš (synth, vocals, electronics)

== Guest musicians & past members ==
- Gunārs Rozenbergs (trompete) (Satellites LV)
- Jānis Volkmanis (trompete) (Satellites LV)
- Mikus Solovejs (saksofons) (Satellites LV, kuba)
- Tīna Ostrovska (perkusijas, ksilofons, vijole) (Satellites LV)
- Haralds Bondars (sitamie instrumenti) (Satellites LV)
- Martinez Gonzalez (rhodes piano, sintezators) (kuba)
- Uldis Zariņš (sitamie instrumenti 1996–2000) (The Satellites)
- Arnis Račinskis (ģitāra) (kuba)
- Laura Ziemele (balss 1996)
- Kristīne Blekte (balss 1996)
- Egīls Eglītis (bass 1996)
- The Liepāja Symphony Orchestra (The Satellites)
- Uldis Marhilevics (stringed instruments 1998) (The Satellites)

== Discography ==
=== Studio albums ===
- Piens (1998)
- Bezvadu (2009)
- Vadu (2009)
- Pagrīdē (2012)
- Varavīksnes galā (2017)

=== EPs ===
- Kind of Glue (2001)

=== Singles ===
- "Happy to Follow" (1998) CD
- "This Is More Than You Could Ever Hope/Move Inside" (1999) CD
- "Blanka, Augstāk! (Jauns Records)" (2011) LP

=== Radio singles ===
| Year | Name |
|---|---|
| 1997 | Nekad nekad |
| 1997 | Disko |
| 1997 | Baseins |
| 1998 | Publiskā vieta |
| 2001 | Kind of Glue |
| 2001 | I Wish I Was A Beach Boy |
| 2007 | Dienas Gaismas Detaļas |
| 2007 | Karavirini |
| 2007 | Pirmais |
| 2008 | Policija brauc! |
