= Mirta Galesic =

Croatian-American psychologist

- Education: University of Maryland, College Park; University of Zagreb; University of Michigan
- Scientific career
- Workplaces: Max Planck Institute for Human Development; Santa Fe Institute; University of Maryland, College Park

Mirta Galesic is a Croatian American psychologist who is the Cowan Chair in Human Social Dynamics at the Santa Fe Institute. She serves as a member of the faculty at the Complexity Science Hub Vienna.

== Early life and education ==
Galesic was born in Croatia. She was an undergraduate student at the University of Zagreb, where she studied psychology. She moved to the theory of marketing, and completed a master's degree. Galesic earned a doctorate in psychology at the University of Zagreb in 2004. In 2004, Galesic left Croatia and joined the University of Michigan, where she studied survey methodology. After completing her graduate studies, Galesic moved to the University of Maryland, College Park. She joined the Max Planck Institute for Human Development as a postdoctoral research fellow.

== Research and career ==
Galesic was appointed to the faculty at the Max Planck Institute for Human Development in 2008. She remained in Berlin until 2015, when she was made Professor at the Santa Fe Institute.

Galesic investigates how cognitive mechanisms interact with their external environments to produce complex phenomena. She is interested in how cognitive bias in social judgements emerge. Additionally, Galesic has studied how people understand and process uncertainty, as well as how they make decisions. She has investigated how researchers can obtain reliable data from social networks. She calls her approach "human social sensing", that is, asking people to gather information on others in their social networks. She studied how Twitter users convey their political opinions, and found that in groups of similar thinking people, Twitter users were more likely to overtly share their opinions, whilst when they were in mixed groups they were likely to use covert messaging. Alongside her work on securing accurate information from social media, Galesic studied hate and counterspeech on Twitter.

== Selected publications ==
- M. Galesic; M. Bosnjak (28 May 2009). "Effects of Questionnaire Length on Participation and Indicators of Response Quality in a Web Survey". Public Opinion Quarterly. 73 (2): 349–360. doi:10.1093/poq/nfp031. ISSN 0033-362X. Wikidata Q59161914.
- S. Fricker (1 September 2005). "An Experimental Comparison of Web and Telephone Surveys". Public Opinion Quarterly. 69 (3): 370–392. doi:10.1093/poq/nfi027. ISSN 0033-362X. Wikidata Q98853083.
- Lyndal J Trevena; Brian J Zikmund-Fisher; Adrian Edwards; et al. (29 November 2013). "Presenting quantitative information about decision outcomes: a risk communication primer for patient decision aid developers". BMC Medical Informatics and Decision Making. 13 Suppl 2: S7. doi:10.1186/1472-6947-13-s2-s7. ISSN 1472-6947. PMC 4045391. PMID 24625237. Wikidata Q30579901.
