= Latvian musical bows =

Two types of musical bow are common in Latvia: the spēles and the pūšļa vijole. The spēles is simply a primitive musical bow that can be plucked, or bowed with a second bow. While the pūšļa vijole (English: bladder fiddle) adds an inflated animal bladder as a resonator.

== See also ==
- Bladder fiddle
