= Jumprava =

Latvian band

- Origin: Latvian SSR, Soviet Union
- Genres: Rock music, Pop music, Synthpop
- Years active: 1984-1992, 1997-present
- Members: Aigars Grauba, Aigars Grāvers, Ainārs Ašmanis, Aigars Krēsla
- Website: jumprava.org.lv

Jumprava is a Latvian, and formerly Soviet, musical group. The band is composed of Aigars Grauba, Aigars Grāvers, Ainārs Ašmanis, and Aigars Krēsla. The group was formed in 1984, and was active until 1992, but resumed activities in 1997 and has been active since.

== Biography ==
=== 1984-1987 ===
Jumprava was formed in April 1984 by Ainārs Ašmanis, Māris Jurjāns, Ainars Vilde, and Antonija Breidaka. During the summer of 1984, they were joined by Hermanis Kaminskis, Ingus Ulmanis, Aigars Voitišķis and Aigars Grāvers. Vilde and Breidaka left the group that same year. With their new lineup, the group recorded their first album No tēvu zemes (“From the Land of Our Fathers”). The songs Par rozēm (“About Roses”) and Mākonis (“Cloud”), which are also part of the Mikrofons ‘85 compilation, helped the group raise to popularity in Latvia. Jurjāns and Kaminskis, who had written many of the band’s songs, left the band in 1986, which briefly sent the group into a crisis until Aigars Krēsla and Aigars Grauba joined. That same year, the band released two more successful singles, Prom no pilsētas (“Away from the City”) and N-tā pietura (“The N-th Stop”), which are also part of the Mikrofons ‘86 compilation. In 1987, singer Ingus Ulmanis and guitarist Aigars Voitišķis left the group and founded a new band, Lādezers.

=== 1987-1992 ===
In 1987, the remaining group members turned more towards electronic music, earning them the nickname "native Depeche Mode". Their sound became somewhat more dynamic, and many new song lyrics were contributed by Grāvers’s flatmate Ritvars Dižkačs. Šeit lejā (“Down here”), Tālu aizgāja (“He Went Far Away”) and Ziemeļmeita, the latter two written by Grauba, were again successful, and two new albums, Jumprava and Pilsēta (“City”) were recorded.

Grauba left the band in early 1989. In 1990 and 1991, the band won the Mikrofons competition with the songs Baltā and Peldētajs (“The Swimmer”) respectively, but disbanded in 1992. Despite their hiatus, the band released several best-of albums.

=== 1997-present ===
The group was revived in 1997 in their present-day lineup (Grauba, Grāvers, Krēsla and Ašmanis), and has been active since. Their first new album, Laika atšķirību romance, was released in 1998 and contained songs such as Lēna upe (“Slow River”), Ēna (“Shadow”) and Auto ‘98. The album was the result of a collaboration with Nataradža, who wrote several of the songs.

A best-of album, Labāko dziesmu izlase, was released in 1999. That same year, the group was awarded the annual prize of the Latvian music industry for their merits in Latvian music (Latvijas Mūzikas ierakstu gada balva par mūža ieguldījumu Latvijas mūzikas attīstībā). Another album, Trajektorija, was released in 2001. Videoclips were produced for the singles Nedaudz par viņu (“A Little Bit About Her”) and Ringā (“In the Ring”). Baiga vasara (“A Horrible Summer”) was the theme song of the movie by the same name, directed by Aigars Grauba.

The Inkarmo album was released in 2005, featuring several songs written by Rolands Ūdris. Liekos dīvains (“I Seem Strange”), Inkarmo, Vārdi (“Words”) and Laimīgs (“Happy“) received radio airplay, video clips were produced for Stacijā (“At the Station”) and Kailass. Another best-of album, Labāko dziesmu izlase II (1984–1990), was released that same year. A double edition of both volumes was released the following year.

On July 6, 2012, Jumprava played their first concert following their hiatus in Ikšķile. For their 30th anniversary, the band released another album, Laiks runā (“Time talks”), in 2014.

In 2019, the group held a concert to commemorate their 35th anniversary. Another album, Insomnia, was released that same year.

In 2024, the group released two new singles: Baltu dzīvi nodzīvot (with Antra Stafecka), and Interneta dzīvnieks. On August 31, the group played their biggest concert so far in Mežaparks, Rīga, to commemorate the band’s 40th anniversary.

== Discography ==
- "Jumprava" (1988)
- "Pilsēta" (1989)
- "Laika atšķirību romance" (1998)
- "Trajektorija" (2001)
- "Inkarmo" (2005)
- "Laiks runā" (2014)
- "Insomnia" (2019)
