= Dūdas =

Latvian musical instrument

wind
- Other names: Somas stabules
- Classification: Aerophone
- Hornbostel–Sachs classification: 422.22-62
- Inventor: Folk instrument

Related instruments
- torupill, dūdmaišis

Musicians
- Auļi, Kaspars Bārbals, Dūdinieki, Mārtiņš Tiltnieks, Dainis Stalts, Pēteris Šeflers, Valdis Muktupāvels, Māris Muktupāvels, Suitu dūdenieki, Māris Jansons

Builders
- Māris Jansons, Eduards Klints, Mārtiņs Tiltnieks, Uldis Austriņš

Dūdas or somas stabules is a type of bagpipe native to Latvia, popular from the 16th to 18th centuries.

== History ==
The instrument is believed to have first appeared in Livonia in the 15th century, with the first documentary evidence of such appearing in the 16th century. The 1550 publication Cosmographia by the scientist Sebastian Münster of Basel shows images of a witch and devils dancing accompanied by a bagpiper, a lutanist, and a lyre player. It is, however, not clear whether the instrument in the drawing is meant to represent instrument used within Livonia or instruments, or is taken from the general style of representing music players in European artwork. However, Münster's descriptions are about Swedish areas and the iconography follows German traditions.

As more direct evidence, Balthasar Russow, in his Livonian Chronicle gave the following description of peasants in nowadays Estonia: "As early as Saturday farmers came from a large distance with their wives, daughters and servants, and immediately resorted to drinking. Dūdas was audible almost a mile away, such hilarity went on all the night until morning. The peasants came drunk to worship God, they talked so loud that the pastor almost lost consciousness from the noise. And when they, having learned nothing, left the church, then began again drinking, dancing, songs and jumping, one could pass out of the great noise, women singing, and the sound from many dūdas. "

Playing the dūdas was banned from 1753 on, but the greatest work of destroying the dūdas tradition was done by the Moravian Church movement – in the areas of Vidzeme, where Moravian Church congregations were the most active, almost all the instruments were collected and destroyed, as a result little is known about older musical traditions of lower classes.

At the end of the 19th century, such musical instruments had disappeared throughout most of Latvia, and only in Alsunga were pipers still present in the beginning of the 20th century. The best-known of these was the bagpiper Pēteris Šeflers (1861-1945), he made a record in 1930s and can also be seen playing in the first Latvian sound film Dzimtene sauc (The Motherland Calls).

== Construction ==
A dūdas is made of a leather bag, and no less than three pipes of different size: the iemutnis ("nipple"), stabule (chanter) and bāga or burdons ("drone").

The bag is traditionally made from the whole skin of a sheep, goat, dog or calf or (in more modern versions) is sewn from hide. The hide is first sewn with fur inside and with only single minimal (double stitch) seam. An additional leather band is then stitched on top of double stitch to create an airtight seal on the bag. Three holes are made – the one is left open at the neck and two are made at the top.

The iemutnis is a small maple pipe gradually narrowing toward the top. It is used to blow air inside the bag. It is inserted through the right front leg or the hole in the upper part of the bag and the skin is sealed by tying it tightly with thin rope. Iemutnis also has a valve made of leather or rubber piece.

The two (or more) other pipes are for playing music. The smaller one - the stabule - is used to play the melody and traditionally was inserted into the left front leg of the skin. The stabule is traditionally made from a stick burned through its entire length by a metal rod. Six to eight playing holes are then burned through the side. The holes are placed at the same distance from each other but had different diameters. In eight-hole design, the seventh hole is on the reverse side of the pipe, and the eighth hole is at the bottom of the pipe on the side. A split goose feather or a cane reed - mēlīte or spiedze - is inserted into one end of the stabule, which is inserted in the bag and tightly sealed with a thin rope. The other end of the stabule is attached to a curved horn - rags - with a widening opening made out of cow's horn. Traditionally Latvian dūdas (bagpipes) are tuned in G or D.

Finally, the bāga or burdons (drone pipe) was made out of large maple stick, also with a spiedze or mēlīte, but without any holes. It produces only a single base tone, called boordon. Traditionally both the stabule and the bāga were not only made of the same type of wood, but also from the very same tree to sound in tune. It is possible that two drone pipes are attached.

== Modern uses ==
The playing of dūdas was reborn in the 1970s and 1980s. Dainis Stalts, Valdis and Māris Muktupāvels, and Māris Jansons are considered the first players of the revived dūdas. The instruments were reconstructed using examples found in the archives of the history museum and images of the instrument. In 1990s there was an attempt to unite all players in a band called Dūdinieki. In 2000 the record company "Upe" issued a collection of dūdas recordings in the album Dūdas Latvijā.

== See also ==
- Torupill
- Dūdmaišis
