= Ģīga =

Musical string instrument

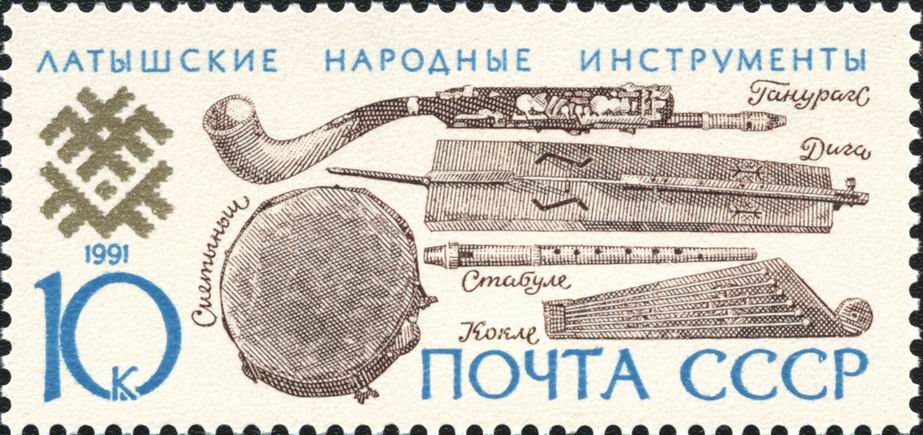
Postage stamp showing Latvian traditional instruments, amongst those the ģīga (2nd instrument from top)

The ģīga or divstīdzis is a two-stringed bowed zither found in Latvia.

The instrument is descended from the psalmodicon (Latvian: vienstīdzis or manihorka), a bowed monochord developed in Sweden in 1829 for liturgical singing. From there it filtered down to the Latvian peasantry who sometimes added a second string for harmony.

== See also ==
- Giga, a type of bowed lyre
- Fiðla, a bowed zither native to Iceland

== Sources ==
- Folklora.lv
