= Stabule =

Latvian woodwind instrument

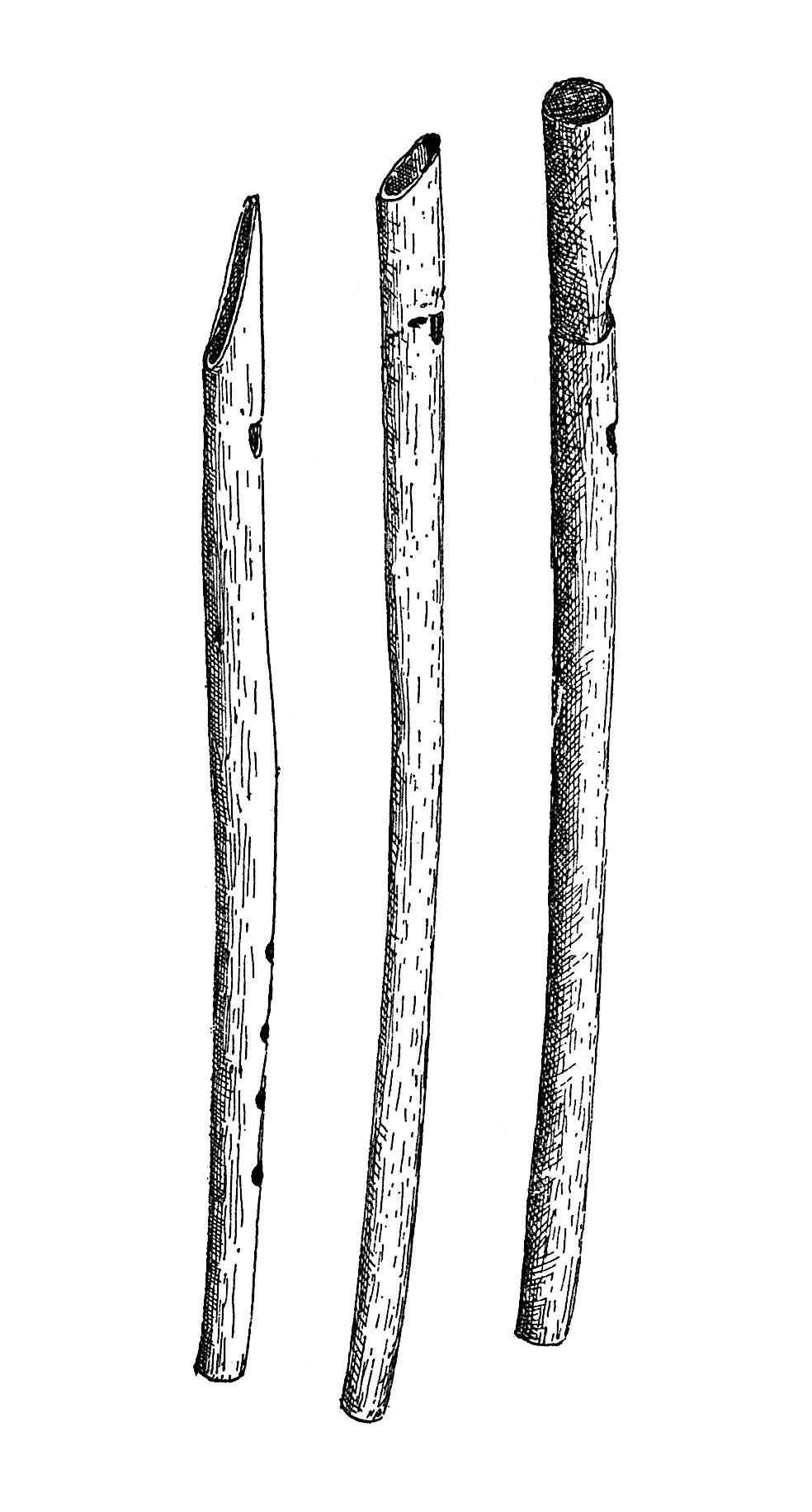
- Polish stabules made of willow bark

Woodwind instrument
- Other names: stebule, stabuļa
- Classification: Aerophone
- Hornbostel–Sachs classification: 421.221.12 (Open single flute with finger holes and an internal duct)

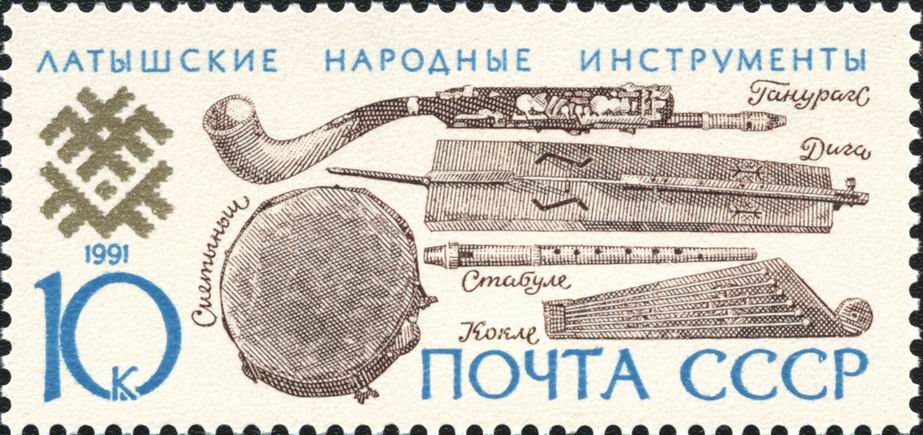
Postage stamp depicting Latvian national instruments, amongst those the stabule

Stabule, also known as stebule or stabuļa, is a Latvian woodwind instrument made from various materials like wood, bark, and reeds. It consists of a tube with a whistle and finger holes, typically producing a diatonic scale. The oldest known Latvian bone stabule dates back to 3,000–2,000 BCE.

== Background ==
The name can apply to variety of wind instruments, but in general sense it is a pipe with 4-8 finger holes. These instruments are 1.5–2.5 cm in diameter and can be anywhere from 20 to 40 cm in length. Stabules have either fipple or reed. Reed stabules were usually made from wood or reed with mouthpiece also made either from reed or wood. Fipple stabules were usually made of wood, although in some areas clay and bark stabules of this type were made and bone stabules have been found by archaeologists. A similar more simple type of stabule without finger holes can be made from willow bark. This type of instrument differs in that its end (opposite to mouthpiece) is plugged. The plug is generally meant for tuning the stabule, but sometimes also used as a slide to adjust tone while playing. All bark stabules were usually made in spring when bark is looser – the features of the stabule are carved right on a fresh broom of willow and the bark is then slid off; the remaining branch is then used to make the fipple and, for the simpler type of stabules, the plug. Due to the natural shrinkage of bark they were short-lived.

== Construction ==
The making of the stabula and reed stabula is described in Andrejs Jurjāns' article "Latvian Folk Music":

The stem was cut from various trees - pine, aspen, blackberry, alder, willow, etc. The wood was warped in the heat and then the core was cut out, through which the barrel emerged; a ready-made barrel - reed was also taken. The stem consisted of two parts - the body and the reeds or reeds (see above). If the body was quite long and thin, then a reed was made at the thin end, turning the reed and thinning it, then six to eight holes were cut into the body, depending on the length, so that a diatonic row of tones came out. If the body was thick, then a reed was placed at the thin end, either from a thinner tree or reed. To soften the sound, a torn reed was wound around the thick end. — Andrejs Jurjāns “Latvian Folk Music”[2]
